= Naval Agent =

Naval Agent, or Navy Agent, may refer to:

- a member of a:
  - naval intelligence service;
  - naval police service, or;
- an archaic/obsolete term for a person who specializes in naval logistics and is usually either a
  - naval supply officer, or;
  - civilian contractor.
