= John Chapple (Royal Navy officer) =

Paymaster Rear-Admiral Sir John Henry George Chapple KCB CVO (4 December 1859 – 5 March 1925) was a Royal Navy officer and courtier. He was the Royal Navy's first Paymaster Director-General, as well as the first paymaster to (retroactively) reach flag rank.
