= List of supply officers in the Royal Navy who have reached flag rank =

This is a list of Royal Naval Paymasters, Supply Officers and Logistics Officers who have reached flag rank, listed in order of seniority as a Rear-Admiral. It was customary for some officers to be promoted upon retirement, so some pre-war paymaster admirals may not have served in the rank on the active list.

Full names are given, where known, and honours and awards are listed in full, but without dates. Dates of birth are not given for the deceased. Appointments held as an admiral are given and a summary, where known, of appointments held since retirement from the Royal Navy.

At any one time, one admiral is appointed as head of the branch, either as Paymaster Director-General from 1918 to 1944, Director-General Supply and Secretariat Branch from 1944 to 1959, Chief Naval Supply and Secretariat Officer (CNSSO) from 1959 to 2004 and, now, Chief Naval Logistics Officer (CNLO). For the last fifty years, this appointment has been an additional job. However, there was no admiral in the logistics branch from 2008–2010 and the post of CNLO was held by the senior Commodore in the branch.

== Supply officers of flag rank ==
If the rank is italicised it is a War Service Rank, an honorary distinction introduced in 1945

- Paymaster Rear-Admiral Sir John Henry George Chapple KCB CVO - retired 1 July 1918. Retroactively promoted to that rank in 1919 with seniority of 6 March 1918
- Paymaster Rear-Admiral Sir William Marcus Charles Beresford Whyte (1863–1932) - promoted to the rank of Paymaster-Director-General 1 July 1918 and to Paymaster Rear-Admiral on 8 November 1918, the first proper paymaster rear-admiral.
- Paymaster Rear-Admiral Charles Augustus Royer Flood Dunbar CBE (1849–1939)
- Paymaster Rear-Admiral Sir Hamnet Holditch Share (1864–1937)
- Paymaster Rear Admiral Charles Edward Allen Woolley CMG (1863–1940)
- Paymaster Rear-Admiral Charles Edward Lynes, CMG
- Paymaster Rear-Admiral Gerald Solfleet (joined RN 1880; retired 1918)
- Paymaster Rear-Admiral Frederick George Motton CBE
- Paymaster Rear-Admiral William Ernest Russell Martin (1867–1946) - (joined RN 1884; retired 1922); author of Adventures of a Naval Paymaster (Herbert Jenkins, 1924)
- Paymaster Rear-Admiral Herbert Arthur David John Gyles (died 1937)
- Paymaster Rear-Admiral George Christopher Aubin Boyer, CBE (1862–1949) - promoted c.1919
- Paymaster Rear-Admiral Sir Charles Fleetwood Pollard KCB CMG (1868–1938) - appointed 3 July 1923 as Paymaster Director-General. Portrait in the National Portrait Gallery, London.
- Paymaster Rear-Admiral Henry Mortlock Ommanney (1870–1935) - promoted c.1922
- Paymaster Rear-Admiral Richard Bosustow Hosking (1869–1962) - promoted 1924
- Paymaster Rear-Admiral William Frederick Cullinan, CMG (1876–1937) - promoted c.1925 and served as Port Accountant Officer, staff of Commander-in-Chief, The Nore, Chatham
- Paymaster Rear-Admiral (later Rear-Admiral (S)) Sir Bertram Cowles Allen KCB MVO (1875–1957) - promoted 1 July 1926 and served as Paymaster Director General (1926–1929)
- Paymaster Rear-Admiral Henry Horniman, CB (1870–1956)
- Paymaster Rear-Admiral (later Rear-Admiral (S)) Sir (Henry Wilfred) Eldon Manisty KCB CMG (1876–1960) - appointed 1 July 1929 as Paymaster Director-General.
- Paymaster Rear-Admiral John Dickenson Holmes (1875–1947) - promoted 1930
- Paymaster Rear-Admiral Sir Edward Ferdinand Murray (187?–1933) - appointed 1 July 1932 as Paymaster Director-General and died in office
- Paymaster Rear-Admiral (later Rear-Admiral (S)) Sir Henry William Woodward KCB (1879–1959) - appointed 10 July 1933 as Paymaster Director-General until July 1936
- Paymaster Rear-Admiral J. Siddalls OBE
- Paymaster Rear-Admiral (later Rear-Admiral S) Sir Arthur (Foster) Strickland KCB OBE (1882–1955) - appointed 10 July 1936 as Paymaster Director-General until retirement in July 1939. Served as Ministry of Food's Chief Divisional Food Officer, Southern Command Area 1941–1943
- Paymaster Rear-Admiral (later Rear-Admiral (S)) Sir David Sidney Lambert KCB OBE (1885–1966) - promoted 10 July 1939 and served as Paymaster Director-General until retirement in July 1942. Served in the Ministry of Supply (Directorate of Economy) 1942–1944. Portrait in the National Portrait Gallery, London.
- Paymaster Rear-Admiral (later Rear-Admiral (S)) Sir William Evelyn Hatten Jolly KCB (1887–1961) - promoted 10 July 1942 and served as Paymaster Director-General until 26 October 1944, then Director-General Supply and Secretariat Branch until July 1945
- Vice-Admiral (S) Sir Malcolm Giffard Stebbing Cull KCB CBE MVO (1891–1962) - appointed 10 July 1945 as Director-General Supply and Secretariat Branch until August 1948
- Rear-Admiral (S) A. J. Wheeler (1894–19xx)
- Rear-Admiral (S) Noel Wright CB, OBE (1890–1975) - promoted c.1944 and Command Supply Officer, Commander-in-Chief, Western Approaches 1944–1945
- Rear-Admiral (S) E. L. Tottenham CB OBE (1896–19xx) - promoted 1 December 1945
- Vice-Admiral (S) Sir (George) Harold Bankart KCB CBE (1893–1964) - promoted 4 August 1948 and served as Director-General Supply and Secretariat Branch until August 1951
- Vice-Admiral (S) Sir William McBride KCB CBE (1895–1959) - appointed 4 August 1951 as Director-General Supply and Secretariat Branch until August 1954
- Rear-Admiral (S) H. P. Chapman CBE (190x–19xx) - promoted 31 March 1949
- Rear-Admiral (S) (later Rear-Admiral) Jack Kenneth Highton CB CBE (1904–1988) - promoted 30 June 1951 and served as Chief Staff Officer (Administration) to Commander-in-Chief Plymouth 1957–1960
- Rear-Admiral (S) Frederick Robert Joseph Mack CB CBE (1987–1959) - promoted 23 August 1951
- Rear-Admiral (S) Alan Watson Laybourne CB CBE (1898–1977) - promoted 31 May 1952
- Rear-Admiral (S) Laurence Arthur Boutwood (1898–1982) - promoted 5 July 1953 and served as Command Supply Officer, Portsmouth (1953–1956)
- Vice-Admiral (S) (later Vice-Admiral) Sir Maurice Herbert Elliott KCB CBE (1897–1972) - promoted Rear-Admiral (S) 4 August 1951 and promoted Vice-Admiral (S) 4 August 1954 and then he served as Director-General Supply and Secretariat Branch until August 1957
- Rear-Admiral (S) (later Rear-Admiral) Richard Allix Braine (1900–1998) - promoted 4 August 1954 and served as Command Supply Officer on staff of Flag Officer, Air (Home) (1954–1956) and Command Supply Officer Portsmouth (1956–1957)
- Vice-Admiral Sir Harry [Henry] Philpot Koelle KCB (1901–1980) - promoted Rear-Admiral (S) 15 May 1955 and to Vice-Admiral 4 August 1957 serving as Director-General Supply and Secretariat Branch until 4 May 1959 when he became Chief Naval Supply and Secretariat Officer (CNSSO) until 1 December 1959. Portrait in the National Portrait Gallery, London.
- Rear-Admiral Ronald Wilson Paffard CB CBE (1904–1994) - promoted 30 June 1957 and served as Chief Staff Officer (Administration) to Commander-in-Chief, Portsmouth 1957–1960
- Vice-Admiral (S) Sir John Strike Lancaster KBE CB (1903–1992) - appointed 1 December 1959 as Chief Naval Supply and Secretariat Officer (CNSSO) until July 1962
- Vice-Admiral Sir Norman (Egbert) Denning KBE CB (1904–1979) - promoted 1958 and served as Deputy Chief of Personnel (1958–1959) and Director of Naval Manpower (1959–1960), Director of Naval Intelligence (1960–64) and Deputy Chief of Defence Staff (Intelligence) (1964–1967). From 10 July 1962 to 24 January 1964 he was also CNSSO. On retirement, appointed Secretary of the Defence, Press and Broadcasting Advisory Committee (the D Notice Committee) 1967–c1970;
- Rear-Admiral Wilfred Geoffrey Stuart Tighe CB (1905–1975) - promoted 7 July 1959
- Rear-Admiral Godfrey Benjamin Teale CB CBE (1908–1978) - promoted 7 July 1960
- Rear-Admiral Richard (Arthur James) Owen CB (1910–1997) - promoted 7 July 1961 and served as Director-General Naval Personal Services 1962–1964
- Rear-Admiral Morrice Alexander McMullen CB OBE (1909–1990) - promoted 7 January 1962 and served as Flag Officer Admiralty Interview Board 1961–1964. After retirement, appointed Director of Civil Defence for London 1965–1968
- Vice-Admiral Sir Horace Collier Lyddon KBE CB (1912–1968) - promoted Rear-Admiral 7 July 1962 and served as Rear-Admiral (Personnel), Naval Air Command (1962–1964); Director-General of Naval Manpower (1964–1967); Admiral President, Royal Naval College, Greenwich (1967–1968) and died in office. Promoted Vice-Admiral 1966. From 24 January 1964 to June 1968 he was also CNSSO
- Vice-Admiral Sir Ronald Vernon Brockman KCB CSI CIE CVO CBE (1909–1999) - promoted to Rear-Admiral 6 April 1963 (but acting Rear-Admiral from 1959 and acting Vice-Admiral in 1963) and served as Principal Staff Officer to the Chief of Defence Staff (1959–1965) having been Admiral's Secretary to Admiral of the Fleet Lord Mountbatten of Burma in all appointments from (1943–1959)
- Rear-Admiral Charles Kerr Thorneycroft Wheen CB (1912–1989) - promoted 7 January 1964 and served as Flag Officer Admiralty Interview Board 1964–1966
- Rear-Admiral John Kingdon Watkins CB (1913–1970) - promoted 7 January 1965
- Rear-Admiral Kenneth (Haydn) Farnhill CB OBE (1913–1983) - promoted 7 January 1966 and served as Director of Management and Support of Intelligence, Ministry of Defence (1966–1969)
- Rear-Admiral Geoffrey Archer Henderson CB (1913–1985) - promoted 7 January 1967 and appointed 10 June 1968 as Chief Naval Supply and Secretariat Officer (CNSSO) until September 1970.
- Rear-Admiral John Douglas Trythall CB OBE (1914–1991) - promoted 7 January 1968 and served as Assistant Chief of Personnel and Logistics, on the central staff of the Ministry of Defence, 1968–1972
- Rear-Admiral Colin (Charles Harrison) Dunlop CB CBE DL (1918–2009) - promoted 7 July 1969 and served as Commander, British Navy Staff, Washington, DC (1969–1971) and Flag Officer, Medway and Port Admiral, Chatham (1971–1974). From September 1970 to February 1974 he was also CNSSO. On retirement he was Director General, Cable Television Association and National Television Rental Association from 1974–1983.
- Rear-Admiral James (Percy Knowles) Harkness CB (1916–2009) - promoted 7 January 1970 and served as Director-General Naval Manpower (1970–1972).
- Admiral Sir Peter White GBE (1919–2010) - promoted Rear-Admiral 7 January 1970 and served as Director-General Fleet Services (1969–1971), Port Admiral, Rosyth, (1972–1974) and Chief of Fleet Support (1974–1977) - promoted Vice-Admiral (1974) and Admiral 28 June 1976. After retirement he was a senior executive of the Industrial Society.
- Rear-Admiral Arthur Brooke Webb CB (1918–2008) - promoted 7 January 1973 and retired 1975
- Rear-Admiral Bill ([William] Noel) Ash CB LVO (1921–2008) - promoted 7 January 1974 and served as Director of Service Intelligence (1974–1977). On retirement he was Secretary of Defence, Press and Broadcasting Advisory Committee 1980–1984.
- Rear-Admiral Frank Wright Hearn CB (1919–1993) - promoted 7 January 1974 and from February 1974 to January 1977 he was CNSSO
- Rear-Admiral Tom ([Thomas] Buckhurst) Homan CB (1921–2008) - promoted 7 January 1975 and served as Director-General Naval Personal Services 1974–1978. After retirement appointed Sub-Treasurer, Inner Temple 1978–1985
- Rear-Admiral Ben(jamin) Cubitt Perowne CB (1921–1992) - promoted 7 January 1976 and from 26 January 1977 to 30 January 1978 he was CNSSO
- Rear-Admiral Charles Arthur Winfield Weston CB (1922–1998) - promoted 7 July 1976 and served as Admiral President, Royal Naval College, Greenwich (1976–1978). After retirement, Appeals Secretary for King Edward VII's Hospital for Officers 1979–1987
- Rear-Admiral Tom ([Thomas] Henry) Bradbury (1922–2021) - promoted 7 July 1977 and served as Flag Officer Admiralty Interview Board (1977–1979). From 30 January 1978 to 23 May 1979 he was CNSSO
- Vice-Admiral Sir James (Edward Campbell) Kennon KCB CBE (1925–1991) - promoted Rear-Admiral 7 July 1978 and served as Assistant Chief of Naval Staff (Policy) (1977–1979) and Port Admiral, Rosyth (1979–1981); promoted Vice-Admiral 7 April 1981 and appointed Chief of Fleet Support (1981–1983). From 23 May 1979 to October 1981 he was CNSSO; see obituary in The Times 26 January 1991
- Rear-Admiral Sir Leslie (William) Townsend KCVO CBE (1924–1999) - promoted 7 January 1979 and served as Defence Services Secretary (1979–1982)
- Vice-Admiral Sir Tony ([Anthony] Sanders) Tippet KCB (1928–2006) - promoted Rear-Admiral 7 July 1979 and served as ACFS (1979–1981) and Flag Officer and Port Admiral, Portsmouth (1981–1983); promoted to Vice-Admiral 11 April 1983 and appointed Chief of Fleet Support (1983–1986). From October 1981 to 8 July 1983 he was CNSSO. On retirement, appointed General Manager (later Chief Executive), Great Ormond Street Children's Hospital
- Rear-Admiral John (Hildred) Carlill OBE DL (1925–2015) - promoted 7 July 1980 and served as Admiral President, Royal Naval College, Greenwich (1980–1982)
- Rear-Admiral John (William Townshend) Walters CB (1926–2008) - promoted 7 January 1981 and served as Assistant Chief of the Defence Staff (Personnel & Logistics) (1981–1984). On retirement, served as Chairman of Industrial Tribunals from 1985.
- Rear-Admiral Ken (neth Dilworth East) Wilcockson [Commander of the British Empire] (1927–1986) - promoted 7 July 1981
- Rear-Admiral Bill ([William] Alleyne) Higgins CB CBE (1928–2007) - promoted 6 August 1982 and served as Flag Officer, Medway and Port Admiral, Chatham (1982–1983) and Director-General Naval Personal Services (1983–1986). From 8 July 1983 to 198x he was CNSSO.
- Rear-Admiral John (Perronet) Barker CB (1930–2003) - promoted 12 April 1983 and served as Chief of Staff to Commander-in-Chief Naval Home Command (1983–1985).
- Rear-Admiral Andrew (John) Richmond CB (1931–2005) - promoted 6 November 1984 and served as Assistant Chief of the Defence Staff (Logistics) (1984–1987).
- Rear-Admiral Peter (Nicholas) Marsden (1932–2022) - promoted 2 September 1985 and served at Royal College of Defence Studies (RCDS) (1985–1988)
- Admiral Sir Brian (Thomas) Brown KCB CBE (1934–2020) - promoted Rear-Admiral January 1986 and served as Director-General Naval Personal Services (1986) and DGNMT (1986–1988); promoted to Vice-Admiral 1988 and appointed Chief of Naval Personnel and Second Sea Lord, and Admiral President, Royal Naval College, Greenwich (1988–1991); promoted Admiral 26 August 1989. Since retirement he has been director or chairman of several companies.
- Rear-Admiral Sir David David Allen KCVO CBE (1933–1994) - promoted 1988 and served as Defence Services Secretary (1988–1991)
- Rear-Admiral Douglas (Morrison) Dow CB DL (born 1 July 1935) - promoted 14 February 1989 and served as Director-General Naval Personal Services (1989–1992) . On retirement, appointed Director, National Trust for Scotland 1992-97
- Rear-Admiral James James Carine (1934–2024) - promoted 10 April 1989 and served as Chief of Staff to Commander-in-Chief Naval Home Command (1989–1991). On retirement, Registrar of the Arab Horse Society from 1992.
- Rear-Admiral (John Geoffrey) Robin Musson CB (1939–2020) - promoted 13 August 1990 and served at Royal College of Defence Studies (RCDS) (1990–1993). Secretary, Diocese of Salisbury Sudan Link 1995–2005
- Rear-Admiral Nick ([Nicholas] John) Wilkinson CB (born 14 April 1941) - promoted 2 January 1991 and served as DGNMT (1992–1994) and Commandant, Joint Services Defence College (JSDC) (1994–1997). On retirement, appointed Secretary of the Defence, Press and Broadcasting Advisory Committee (the D Notice Committee) 1999–2004.
- Rear-Admiral (Frederick) Brian Goodson CB CBE (1938–2015) - promoted 1 February 1993 and served as Assistant Chief of the Defence Staff (Logistics) (1993–1996). After retirement, appointed Chairman, Wiltshire St John Council (1996–2005).
- Rear-Admiral Rodney Burnett Lees CVO (born 31 December 1944) - promoted 21 February 1995 and served as Chief of Staff to Second Sea Lord and Commander-in-Chief Naval Home Command (1995–1997), DGNPS&P (1997–1998) and Defence Services Secretary (1998–2001)
- Rear-Admiral Louis [John Herbert Arthur James] Armstrong CBE (1946–2014) - promoted 3 January 1996 and served at Royal College of Defence Studies (RCDS) (1996–1998). Since retirement, served as Chief Executive, Royal Institution of Chartered Surveyors (RICS) until 2010.
- Vice-Admiral Peter (Arthur) Dunt CB (1947–2020) - promoted Rear-Admiral 1997 and served as Chief of Staff to Second Sea Lord and Commander-in-Chief Naval Home Command (1997–1999) and promoted Vice-Admiral on appointment as Chief Executive, Defence Estates (2002–2007).
- Rear-Admiral Roger (Graham) Lockwood CB (born 1950) - promoted 2000 and served as Chief of Staff to Second Sea Lord and Commander-in-Chief Naval Home Command (2000–2003) at Royal College of Defence Studies (RCDS) (2003–2005). Appointed Chief Executive, Northern Lighthouse Board, in May 2006.
- Rear-Admiral Mike [Michael] Kimmons CB (born 24 December 1953) - promoted 15 March 2005 and served as Chief of Staff (Support) to Commander-in-Chief Fleet and Chief Naval Logistics Officer. Retired 2008 and appointed Chief Executive Officer of St Philips Chambers, Birmingham, until early 2009; appointed Chief Executive, British Orthopaedic Association in January 2010.
- Vice-Admiral Sir David (George) Steel KBE DL (born 6 April 1961) - promoted 30 April 2010 and appointed Naval Secretary on the staff of Second Sea Lord in Portsmouth; promoted Sep 2012 and appointed Second Sea Lord and continued to be Chief Naval Logistics Officer (CNLO) until retirement 10 March 2015 .

== Bibliography ==
Sources and acknowledgements:

1. The Navy List - 1918 to date
2. The Pusser and His Men by Ben Warlow (Ministry of Defence (DFSD), 1984) - a short history of the Supply and Secretariat Branch of the Royal Navy
3. Liddell Hart Centre for Military Archives online (King's College, London). It is particularly helpful in giving a brief outline of the earlier careers of some of the officers and a link is offered to readers
4. Who's Who 1998
5. "Notes on the Paymaster Branch" by Lt John H Beattie RN
6. The Oxford Dictionary of National Biography (OUP) - online version accessible free with a UK Public Library ticket
