= Laurence Boutwood =

Royal Navy Rear Admiral (1898-1982)

Rear-Admiral Laurence Boutwood CB OBE KStJ
- Boutwood in 1958
- Born: Laurence Arthur Boutwood; 7 September 1898
- Died: 29 July 1982 (aged 83)
- Military career
- Allegiance: United Kingdom
- Branch: Royal Navy
- Rank: Rear-Admiral
- Awards: CB, OBE, KStJ

Rear-Admiral Laurence Arthur Boutwood CB OBE KStJ (7 September 1898 – 29 July 1982) was a senior Royal Navy officer.

== Naval career ==
Born on 7 September 1898, Laurence Boutwood was educated at Bedford School and at the University of Cambridge. He served in the Royal Navy during the First World War, between 1916 and 1918. He was appointed secretary to the rear admiral in charge of aircraft carriers between 1931 and 1933, as secretary to the Third Sea Lord between 1934 and 1939, as secretary to the Fourth Sea Lord between 1943 and 1944, as fleet supply officer, British Pacific Fleet, between 1945 and 1946, and as assistant director of pans at the Admiralty between 1946 and 1948. He was fleet supply officer, Mediterranean Station, between 1950 and 1953, and command supply officer, Portsmouth, between 1953 and 1956. He retired from the Royal Navy in 1956.

Rear Admiral Laurence Boutwood was invested as a Companion of the Order of the Bath in 1955, and as a Knight of the Order of Saint John in 1966. He died on 29 July 1982.
