= Brian Brown (Royal Navy officer) =

Royal Navy Admiral (1934–2020)

Admiral Sir Brian Brown KCB CBE
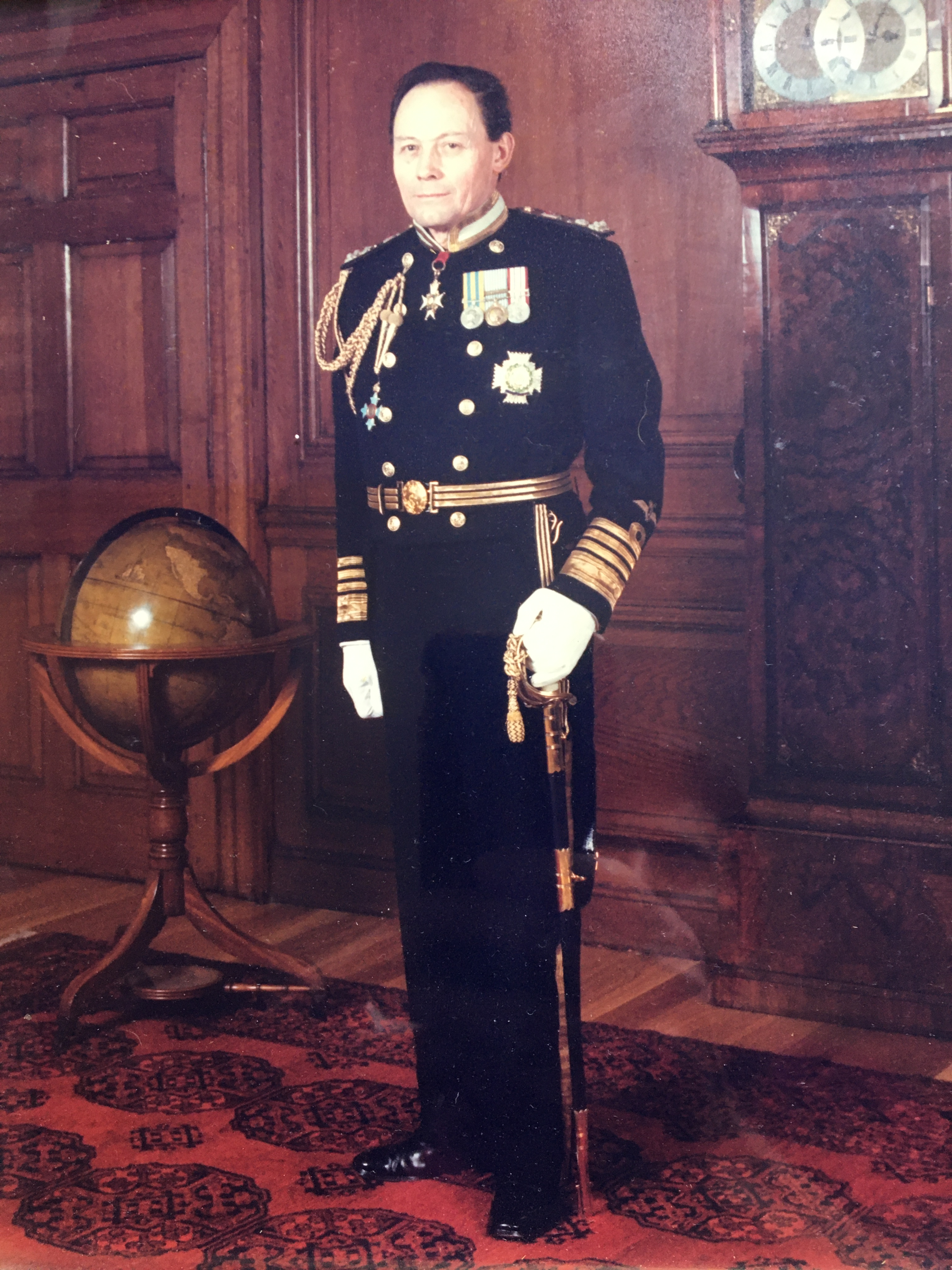
- Sir Brian Brown
- Born: 31 August 1934
- Died: 27 April 2020 (aged 85)
- Military career
- Allegiance: United Kingdom
- Branch: Royal Navy
- Service years: 1952–1991
- Rank: Admiral
- Commands: HMS Raleigh
- Conflicts: Korean War
- Awards: Knight Commander of the Order of the Bath; Commander of the Order of the British Empire

Admiral Sir Brian Thomas Brown, KCB, CBE (31 August 1934 – 27 April 2020) was a senior Royal Navy officer who served as Second Sea Lord and Chief of Naval Personnel from 1988 to 1991.

== Naval career ==
Born in Fratton, Portsmouth, and educated at Peter Symonds' School, Brown joined the Royal Navy on 1 May 1952, entering the Britannia Royal Naval College, Dartmouth as a Special Entry Cadet (S) in the Supply and Secretariat branch. During 28 months of general naval training he served at sea in the training cruiser HMS Devonshire, in the Caribbean and Mediterranean, and the maintenance carrier HMS Unicorn (including service during the Korean War) and ashore in HMS Peregrine, Royal Naval Air Station Ford, Sussex. He was promoted after one year as a cadet (S), to midshipman (S) on 1 May 1953.

On promotion to acting sub-lieutenant, Brown began professional training at HMS Ceres, Wetherby, on 1 September 1954 before joining the Royal Naval College, Greenwich, for the Junior Officers' War Course and naval legal training on 4 January 1955. Courses and training successfully completed, he was confirmed as sub-lieutenant (S) on 31 August 1955 and joined the light cruiser HMS Kenya as supply officer (cash), later being appointed, in addition, sub-lieutenant of the Gunroom; he was promoted to lieutenant on 1 May 1956.

=== Naval aviator ===
A shortage of naval aviators led to a few supply officers being selected for flying training, something that was highly unlikely before the General List of Royal Navy officers was established on 1 April 1956, whereby distinction between branches of naval officers reduced markedly. Brown joined RAF Syerston on 2 June 1957 for basic flying training (BFT) on Provosts before moving on to RAF Linton-on-Ouse to continue BFT and then undergo advanced flying training (AFT) on Vampires, being awarded his Fleet Air Arm pilot's wings on 11 July 1958. His operational flying training (OFT) began when he joined the Naval Air Fighter School, HMS Fulmar, flying Sea Hawks. He spent the next three years in flying appointments, before reverting to traditional appointments as a supply officer.

Brown's first flying appointment, on 10 December 1958, as a qualified naval aviator, was to 898 Naval Air Squadron, a front line Sea Hawk ground attack squadron, based at HMS Goldcrest, RNAS Brawdy, Pembrokeshire. With the squadron, he embarked in the aircraft carrier HMS Eagle on 14 January 1959, seeing service in the Mediterranean; the ship paid off in June 1959, for major modernization, and 898 Naval Air Squadron was disbanded.

In order to extend his time with the Fleet Air Arm, Brown volunteered for helicopter flying training and joined HMS Seahawk, in Cornwall, on 8 June 1959 for the helicopter conversion course with 705 Naval Air Squadron, flying Hiller HT Mk 1 and Whirlwind helicopters. Three months later he was in HMS Osprey, Portland, for the anti-submarine operational flying course in Whirlwind Mk 7s with 737 Naval Air Squadron. Training completed, in the first week of 1960 he joined 848 Naval Air Squadron, a front-line Whirlwind Mk 7 commando helicopter squadron based at HMS Ariel, RNAS Worthy Down. With the squadron he embarked in HMS Bulwark, newly commissioned as the Royal Navy's first commando carrier, for work up with 42 Commando Royal Marines in Malta and Libya before sailing for operations in the Red Sea, Indian Ocean and Far East; operational commitments included the Kuwait Crisis in July 1961 and flying in support of Army units fighting communist insurgents close to the Malaysia/Thailand border.

On 13 October 1961, Brown reverted to general service supply duties when he joined the LST HMS Narvik as deputy supply officer; she had been converted to be the support ship in Malta for the five submarines of the 5th Submarine Squadron and the thirteen minesweepers of the 108th Minesweeping Squadron. He stayed in Malta, taking over as first lieutenant and supply officer of the Msida Minesweeper Base, a tender to the heavy repair ship (a converted Cunard liner) HMS Ausonia on 2 June 1962. Three months later he joined the staff of the Commander-in-Chief Mediterranean, in the RN Headquarters at Lascaris, as staff officer of the committee for planning the run down of the Malta Naval Base. On completion of that task he was appointed secretary to the captain of the fleet, still on the staff of the Commander-in-Chief Mediterranean, in November 1962.

Brown was promoted to lieutenant commander on 1 May 1964 and joined the Royal Naval Supply School (RNSS), HMS Pembroke, Chatham, for No. 4 Supply Charge Course, the senior professional course for RN supply officers. His first appointment, on 4 August 1964, was to the Main Building, Ministry of Defence, Whitehall, as Assistant Secretary to the First Sea Lord (A/Sec/1SL) where he served two successive heads of the Royal Navy; the former, Admiral Sir David Luce, resigned after the Royal Navy's aircraft carrier programme was cancelled by the government in 1966. Success, after two years in that demanding office, led to his next, prestigious, appointment as deputy supply officer and assistant secretary to the Flag Officer Royal Yachts in HM Yacht Britannia on 25 August 1966, a job he was to hold for the next twenty-seven months. On 1 November 1968 he joined HMS Heron, RNAS Yeovilton, as deputy supply officer.

Selected in June 1969 for early promotion to commander at the end of that year, Brown was promoted to acting commander on 15 December 1969 when he took over as Secretary to Flag Officer, Carriers and Amphibious Ships (FOCAS), in offices ashore at Fort Southwick, overlooking Portsmouth Harbour. Eighteen months later he was back in Whitehall, appointed as a member of Naval Secretary's Officers Planning Group; he was also responsible for developing policy for the training of officers of the Supply & Secretariat specialisation.

Brown joined the helicopter cruiser HMS Tiger as her supply officer ('Commander (S)') on 29 September 1973. The ship, flying the flag of Flag Officer Second Flotilla, led the first RN Group Deployment to the Far East, returning to the United Kingdom via the Cape; he was Group Logistics Officer and also flew on occasions as second pilot in Sea King helicopters from HMS Tiger's 826 Naval Air Squadron to help with aircrew manning problems.

Brown's next appointment, on 15 August 1975, as secretary to the Vice Chief of the Naval Staff, brought with it promotion to acting captain. He served three years in this post in the Ministry of Defence, Whitehall, during which time he was selected for promotion to captain (seniority 30 June 1977). He returned to HMS Heron, Yeovilton, on 11 September 1978, for his next appointment as Chief Staff Officer (Personnel & Administration) to Flag Officer Naval Air Command.

After just over a year in the Fleet Air Arm's headquarters, Brown returned to Whitehall on 9 November 1979 as secretary to the First Sea Lord (1SL). The 1SL was Admiral Sir Henry Leach and the three years of his appointment included the Falklands War and the Nott Defence Review. He was appointed a Commander of the Order of the British Empire in the 1983 New Year Honours and, three days later, on 4 January 1983, began the one-year course in London as a student at the Royal College of Defence Studies.

Brown was appointed commanding officer of the new-entry training establishment HMS Raleigh, in Cornwall, on 4 January 1984.

=== Flag officer ===
Brown was promoted to rear admiral and appointed Director-General Naval Personal Services on 28 January 1986. He became Director-General, Naval Manpower and Training on 24 November 1986 and, from 1987, was also Chief Naval Supply and Secretariat Officer. Promoted to vice admiral on 28 September 1988, he joined the Navy Board as Second Sea Lord and Chief of Naval Personnel and, concurrently, admiral president of the Royal Naval College, Greenwich. As Second Sea Lord he secured Navy Board agreement that women should be allowed to serve at sea and the Women's Royal Naval Service merged with the Royal Navy. He was knighted as a Knight Commander of the Order of the Bath on 17 June 1989 and, on 26 August, he was promoted to admiral while serving as Second Sea Lord (only the second supply officer to reach four-star rank). He was placed on the Retired List of the Royal Navy on 26 June 1991.

== Later life ==
After retiring from the Royal Navy, Brown became Chairman of the Cray Electronic's Defence Group of five companies and was also appointed a non-executive director of the main company board. He subsequently became chairman of P-E International (UK's oldest management consultancy company) and a non-executive director of the IT support company, Lorien plc. He was also chairman of King George's Fund for Sailors (1993– 2003), the Michael May Young Cricketers Foundation (1992–2004) and of the Executive Committee of the Nuffield Trust for Forces of the Crown (1996–2006). Additionally he was president of the Victory Services Association (1993–2004), the Friends of the Royal Naval Museum and HMS Victory (1992–2003) and CPRE Hampshire (2008–2013) and he continued to be president of the Portsmouth Services Fly Fishing Association. He was a council member of the Forces Pension Society (1992–1998) and its vice-president (1999–2013), and a council member of the Navy Records Society (1993–97). He was also Churchwarden, Froxfield with Privett (1999–2008) and Joint Master Clinkard and Meon Valley Beagles (2003–2009). He was accepted as a Freeman of the City of London in 1989 and was a liveryman of the Worshipful Company of Gardeners since 1991.

== Personal life and death ==
In 1959 Brown married Veronica (Ronnie) Mary Elizabeth Bird (Lady Brown). They had two sons, Mark and Matthew, and three grandsons, and lived in Petersfield.

Brown's leisure activities included beagling, fly fishing, gardening and protecting the Hampshire countryside. He died on 27 April 2020, at the age of 85. Lady Veronica Brown died after a short illness on 30 September 2024, at the age of 89.

Military offices
Preceded by Sir Richard Fitch	Second Sea Lord; 1988–1991	Succeeded by Sir Michael Livesay
