= Magazine (artillery) =

Place of storage for ammunition or other explosive material

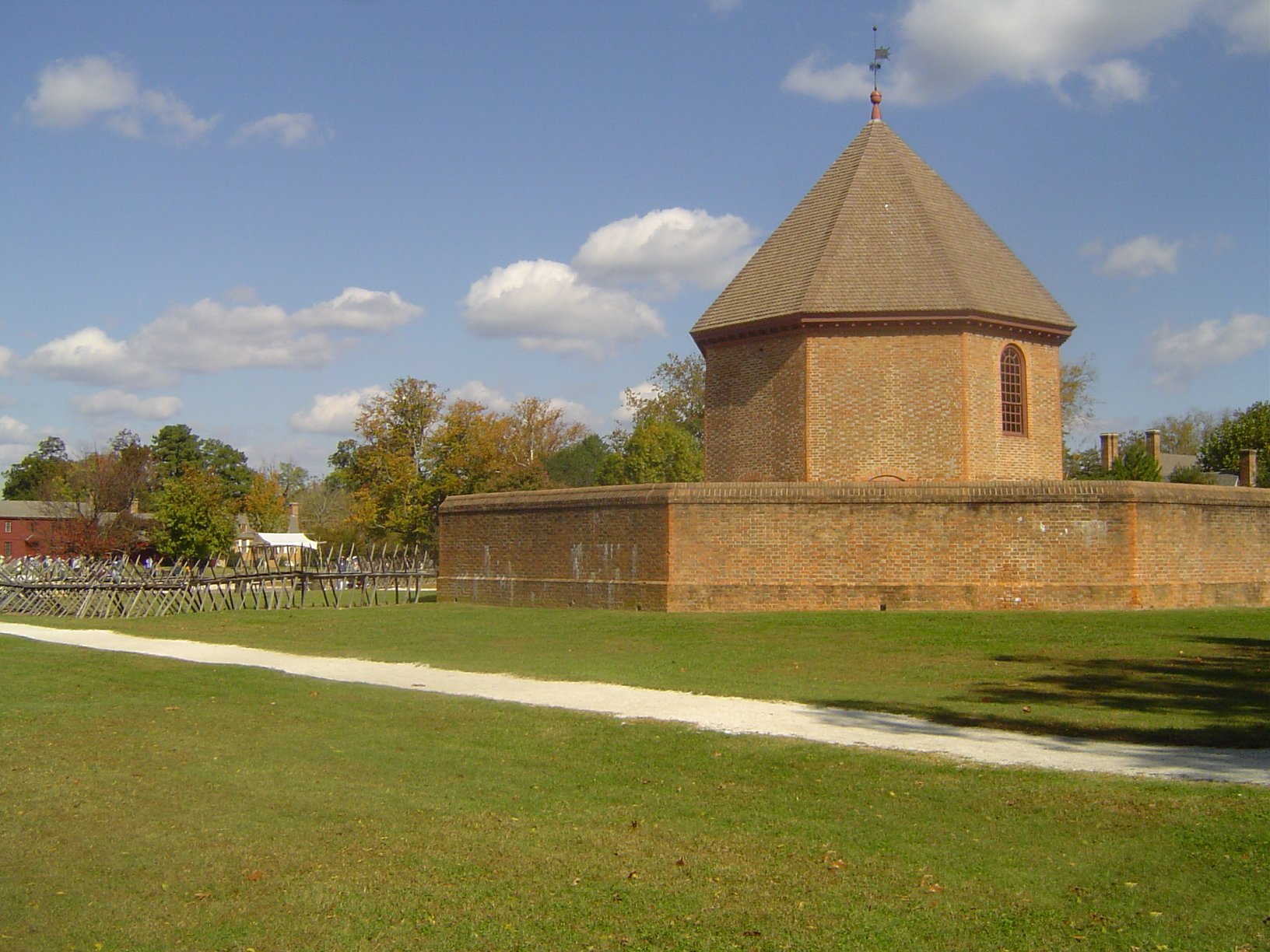
Colonial Williamsburg magazine of the eighteenth century in Virginia

A magazine is an item or place within which ammunition or other explosive material is stored. The word is taken originally from the Arabic word makhāzin (مخازن), meaning "storehouses", via Italian and Middle French.

The term is also used for an ammunition dump, a place where large quantities of ammunition are stored for later distribution. This usage is less common.

== Field magazines ==
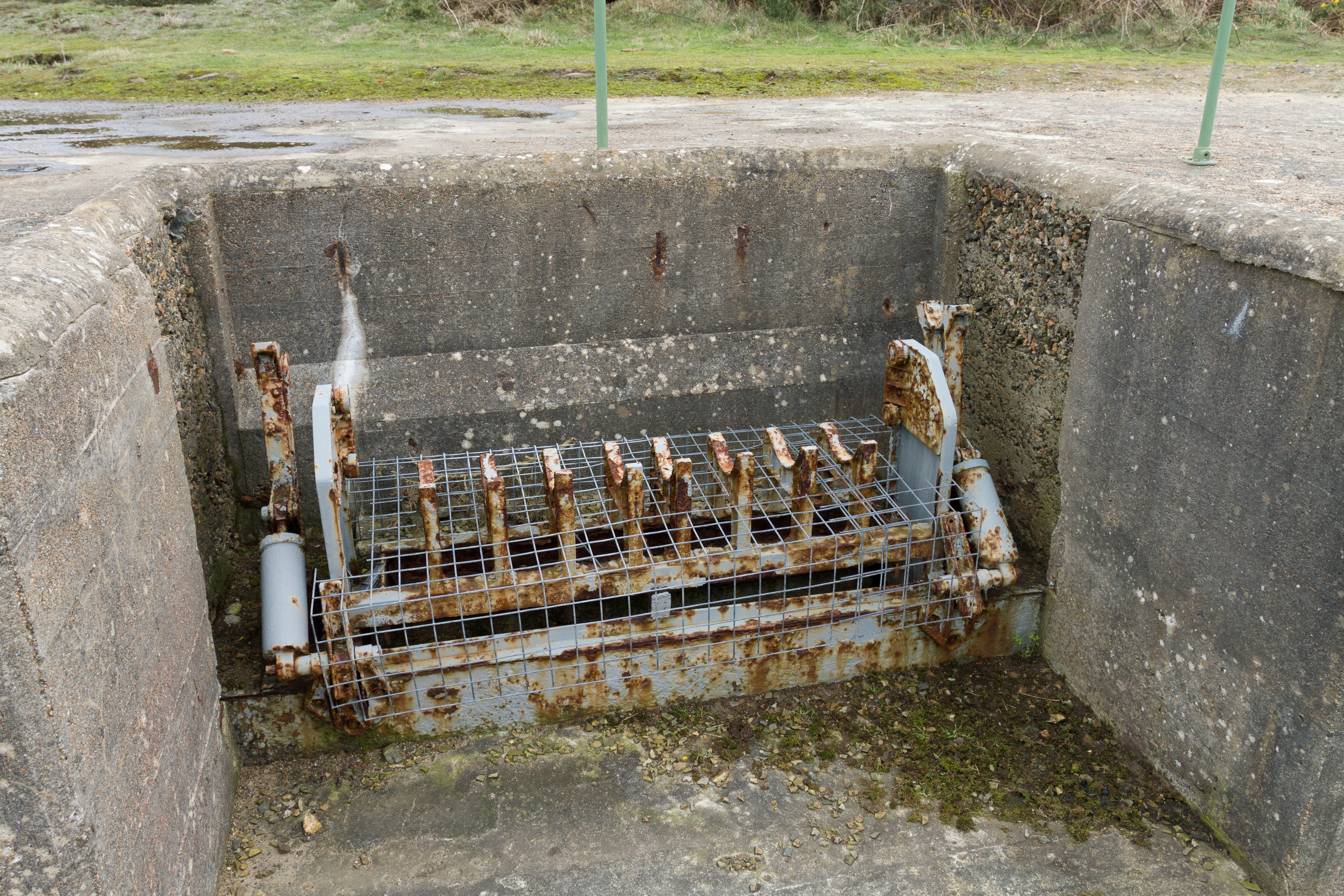
A shell hoist within a fixed gun emplacement at Battery Moltke, used to lift ordnance from a room below

In the early history of tube artillery drawn by horses (and later by mechanized vehicles), ammunition was carried in separate unarmored wagons or vehicles. These soft-skinned vehicles were extremely vulnerable to enemy fire and to explosions caused by a weapons malfunction.

Therefore, as part of setting up an artillery battery, a designated place would be used to shelter the ready ammunition. In the case of batteries of towed artillery the temporary magazine would be placed, if possible, in a pit, or natural declivity, or surrounded by sandbags or earthworks. Circumstances might require the establishment of multiple field magazines so that one lucky hit or accident would not disable the entire battery.

== Naval magazines ==
Animated naval gun operations: 1. Platform deck; 2. Shell room; 3. Lower deck; 4. Magazine; 5. Middle deck; 6. Trunk; 7. Main deck; 8. Barbette; 9. Working chamber; 10. Upper deck; 11. Roller path; 12. Cradle; 13. Gunhouse

The ammunition storage area aboard a warship is referred to as a magazine or the "ship's magazine" by sailors.

Historically, when artillery was fired with gunpowder, a warship's magazines were built below the water line—especially since the magazines could then be readily flooded in case of fire or other dangerous emergencies on board the ship. An open flame was never allowed inside the magazine.

More modern warships use semi-automated or automated ammunition hoists. The path through which the naval artillery's ammunition passed typically has blast-resistant airlocks and other safety devices, including provisions to flood the compartment with seawater in an emergency.

The separation of shell and propellant gave the storage of the former the name "shell room" and the latter "powder room".

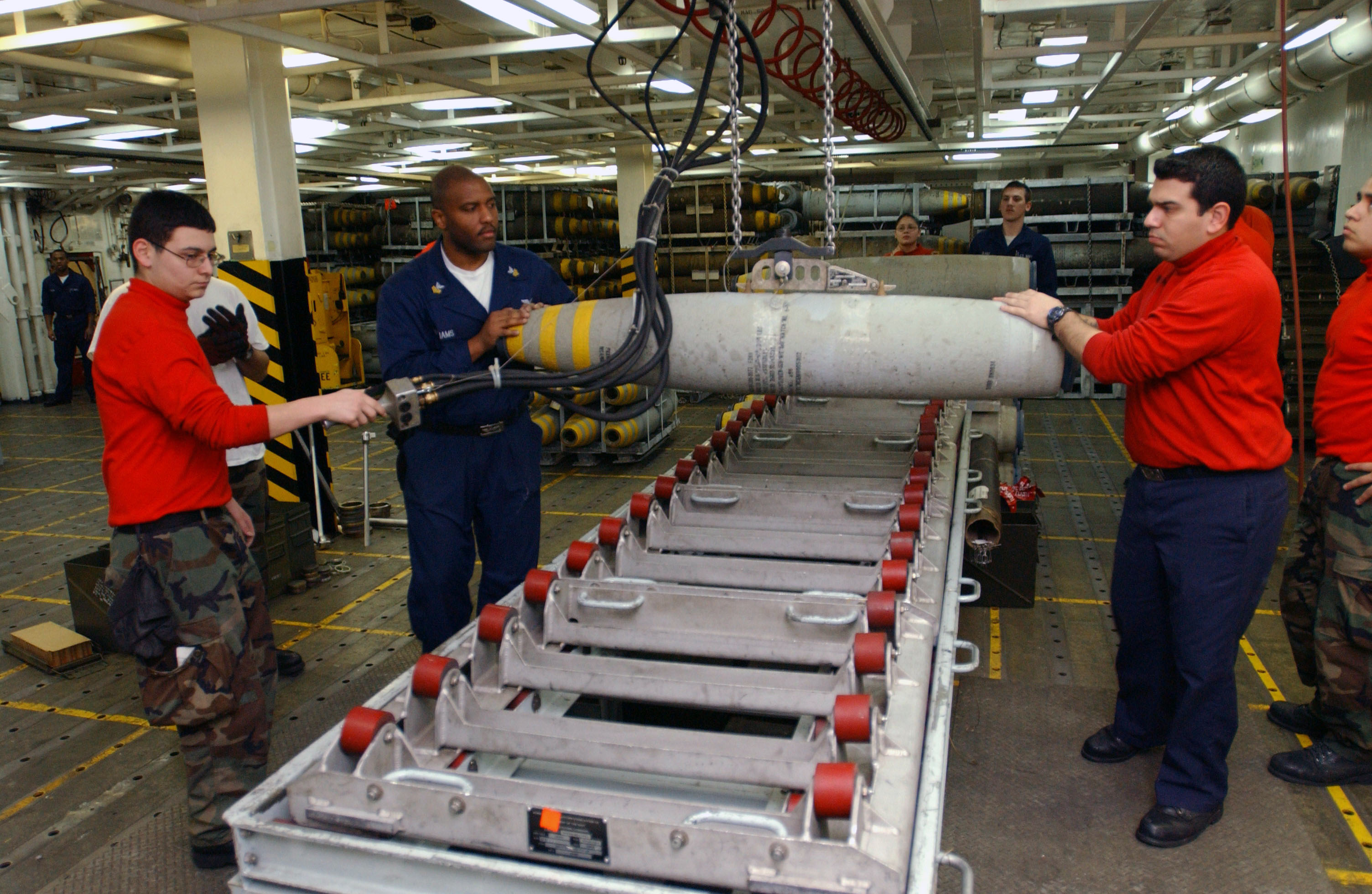
Weapons magazine aboard USS Theodore Roosevelt in 2003

Surface warships that have carried torpedoes, and ones that still do (such as the Mark 46 torpedo for antisubmarine warfare), have had torpedo magazines for carrying these dangerous antiship and antisubmarine weapons in well-defended compartments.

With the advent of missile-equipped warships, the term missile "magazine" has also been applied to the storage area for guided missiles on the ship, usually carried below the main decks of the warships. For ships with both forward and aft surface-to-air missile launchers, there are at least two missile magazines. Sometimes the magazines of guided-missile frigates and guided-missile destroyers have carried or do carry a mixture of various types of missiles: surface-to-air missiles, antisubmarine missiles such as the ASROC missile, and anti-ship missiles such as the Harpoon missile. See especially the Oliver Hazard Perry-class frigates, owned by several different navies around the world, in which one 40-missile magazine carries a mixture of all three types of missiles: surface-to-air, surface-to-surface, and surface-to-underwater.

In aircraft carriers, the magazines are required to store not only the aircraft carrier's own defensive weapons, but all of the weapons for her warplanes, including rapid-fire gun ammunition, air-to-air missiles such as the Sidewinder missile, air-to-surface missiles such as the Maverick missile, Mk 46 ASW torpedoes, Joint Direct Attack Munitions, "dumb bombs", HARM missiles, and anti-ship missiles such as the Harpoon missile and the Exocet missile.

=== Detonation threat ===
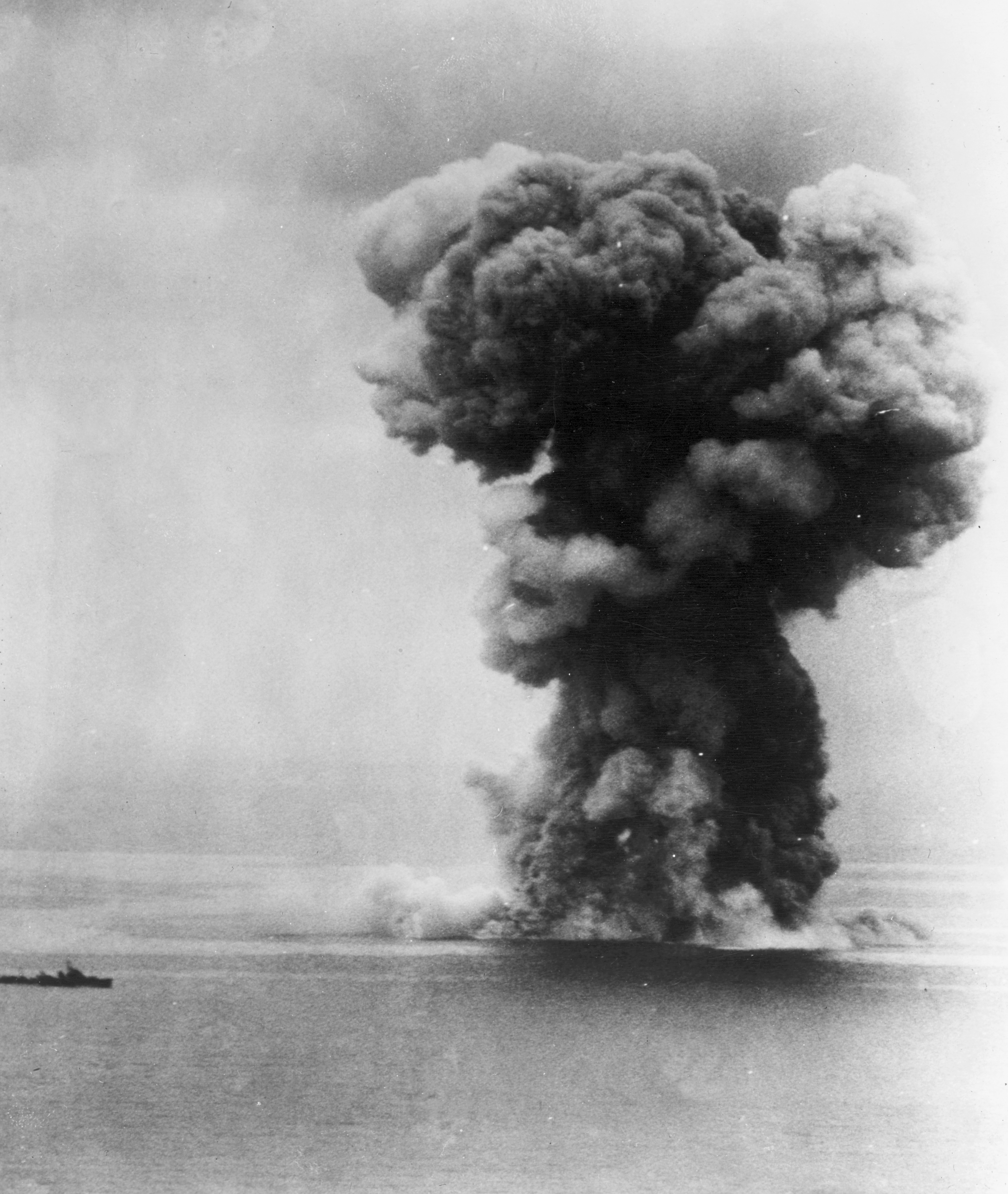
The magazines of the Yamato explode

Naval magazines face considerable risk of detonation, especially in cases of attack, accident, or fire. Such detonations have sunk many warships and caused many other incidents.

Design considerations to prevent magazine detonation include putting magazines under the water line, thoroughly armoring them and adjacent ammunition handling spaces, and ensuring a space for liquid between the outer hull and the inner armor.

Battleships were highly armored to protect from external attack, but the strength of the construction aids to constrict and worsen the impact of internal explosions, as the rigid steel does not allow blast waves to dissipate. The USS Iowa turret explosion was such an example: in 1989 a loading incident caused a gun turret explosion, which spread to further powder stores in the turret, which eventually killed all 47 men in the turret. The turret served to contain the blast, protecting the rest of the ship, but amplified the blast inside the turret ensuring deadly conditions.

During World War II, many ships met their end via magazine detonations. During the 1941 Attack on Pearl Harbor, the USS Arizona was destroyed when a Japanese armor-piercing bomb punched through her deck and detonated in proximity to the ship's ammunition magazine, which was caught on film. The magazines of the Japanese battleship Yamato exploded in 1945 after hours of continuous assault by Allied aircraft, utterly destroying the ship and leaving few survivors.

== See also ==
- Ammunition dump
- Arsenal
- Gunpowder magazine
- Gunroom
