= Les Landes =

Area of coastal heathland in Jersey

Coordinates: 49.2511°N 2.2495°W

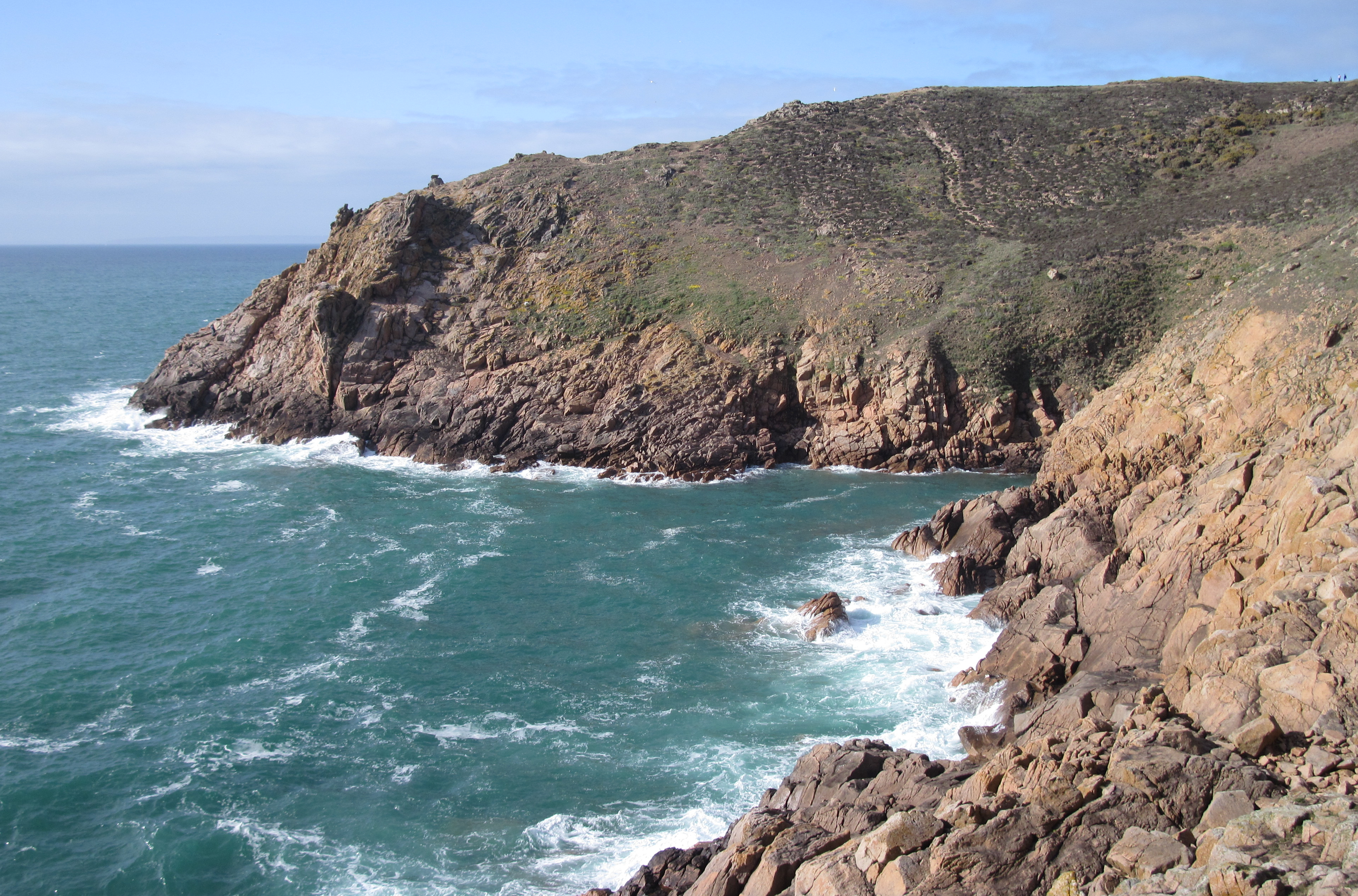
Rouge Nez is a headland at Les Landes

Les Landes is an area of coastal heathland in the north-west of Jersey. It has been designated as a Site of Special Interest (SSI) since 1996.

The site is the largest of its kind in Jersey at 160 ha.

== Site of Special Interest ==
Les Landes was designated as an SSI for its landscape, wildlife, archaeology and geological features.

== Wildlife ==
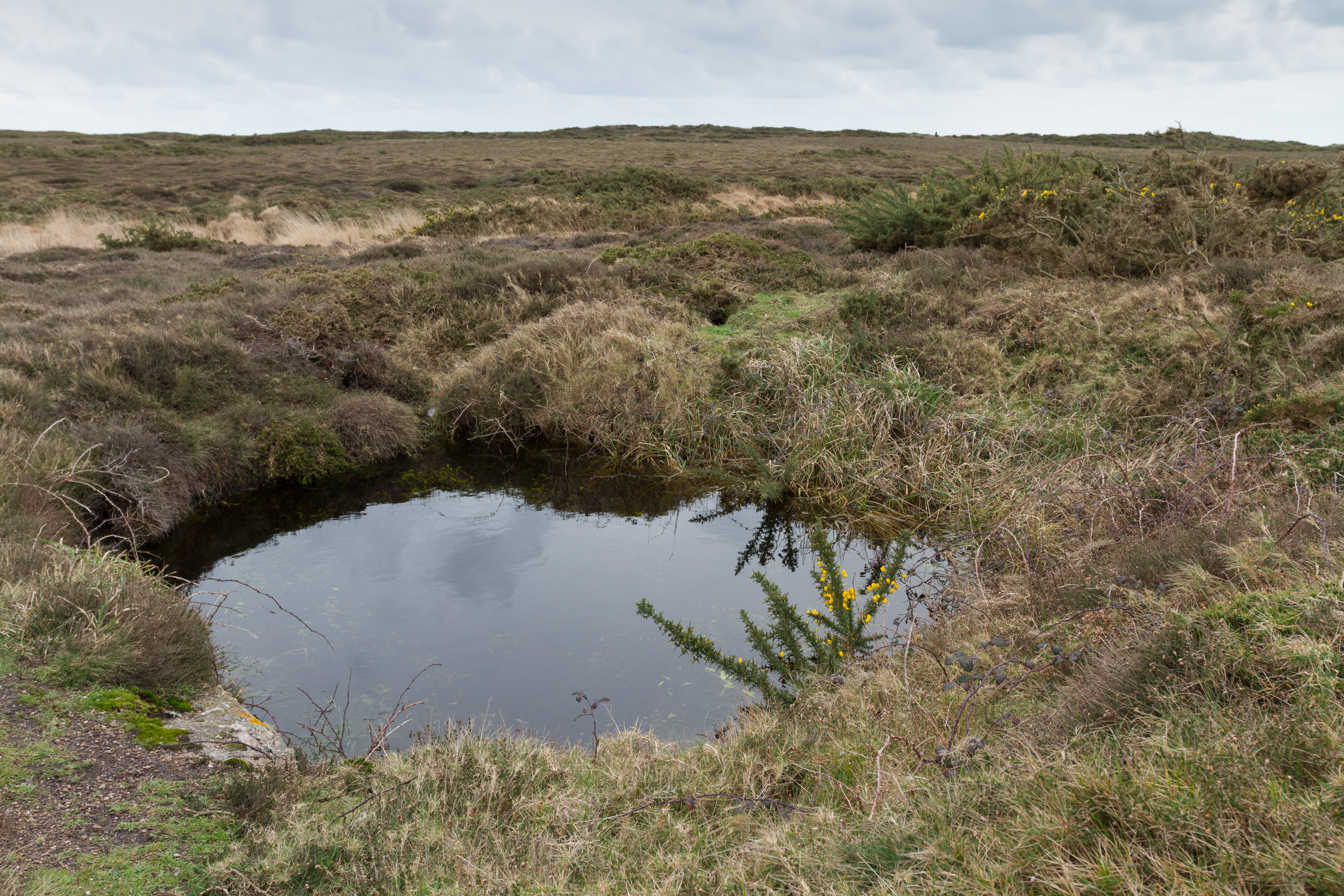
A pond at Les Landes, Jersey

Most of the site is covered in heathers such as Erica and Calluna, and gorse. Other plants which grow here include Molinia caerulea and bracken.

Ponds and other wetland areas are home to the common toad.

=== Birds ===
Birds found at Les Landes include the Eurasian skylark, European stonechat, Dartford warbler, meadow pipit, common raven, common linnet, western jackdaw, barn swallow, northern wheatear, western yellow wagtail, Eurasian dotterel, European golden plover, Eurasian wryneck, ring ouzel, western marsh harrier, hen harrier, merlin, peregrine falcon, and short-eared owl.

=== Other animals ===
Other animals which live at Les Landes include the European rabbit, western green lizard, slowworm, bank vole, small emperor moth, bloody-nosed beetle, and green tiger beetle.

== Archaeological sites ==
=== La Cotte à la Chèvre ===
This is a Middle Paleolithic occupation site featuring a small cave. Flints and a hand axe have been found here.

=== Le Pinacle ===
Le Pinacle is a natural stack where artifacts dating from the Neolithic and Chalcolithic periods, the Bronze Age, and the Iron Age, have been found, as well as the ruins of a Gallo-Roman temple.

== See also ==
- Battery Moltke
