= Nick Wright (Royal Navy officer) =

Private Secretary to The Princess Royal

Captain Sir Nicholas Peter Wright, KCVO (born 1949) was Private Secretary to The Princess Royal from 2002 to 2019. On his retirement from the post he was appointed an Extra Equerry to Her Royal Highness from 1 February 2019.

He was educated at Ampleforth College, the Britannia Royal Naval College, Dartmouth, and the Joint Service Defence College.

Commissioned into the Royal Navy in 1968 as a Supply and Secretariat Branch officer, he served in HMS Whitby and HMS Diomede 1969–1973, and was flag lieutenant to the Flag Officer Medway 1973–1975. In 1976–1977 he was deputy supply officer in the guided missile destroyer HMS Norfolk. From 1978 to 1980 he was on the staff of the Headquarters Allied Forces Northern Europe, Oslo (a NATO appointment). In 1980–1982 he was Supply Officer of the frigate HMS Lowestoft.

In 1982–1984 he was assistant secretary to the Second Sea Lord in Main Building, Whitehall, and from 1985 to 1987 on the staff of the Britannia Royal Naval College, Dartmouth. From 1987 to 1989 he was deputy supply officer in the aircraft carrier HMS Illustrious and, after promotion to commander, he was secretary to the Flag Officer Portsmouth from 1989 to 1991.

In 1992–1994 Wright served in the Royal Yacht Britannia as Supply Officer, and was then secretary to the Assistant Chief of Naval Staff (1995–1997) in Whitehall. He was promoted to captain in 1997.

In 1998–2000 he was chief staff officer (personnel) to Flag Officer Naval Aviation at RNAS Yeovilton (HMS Heron). His last post was as executive assistant to Deputy Supreme Allied Commander Atlantic Command, in Norfolk, Virginia, from 2000 to 2002.

He retired from the Royal Navy in 2002 and joined the Office of the Princess Royal.

The Household of The Princess Royal provides the administrative support to Her Royal Highness The Princess Royal, daughter of Queen Elizabeth II. It is based at St James' Palace, and is headed by the Private Secretary.

The Household is separate from the Royal Household and is funded by the King from his income from The Duchy of Lancaster.

Wright was appointed Lieutenant of the Royal Victorian Order (LVO) in the 1995 New Year Honours and Commander of the Royal Victorian Order (CVO) in the 2010 Birthday Honours. He was appointed Knight Commander of the Royal Victorian Order (KCVO) on 11 December 2018 upon relinquishing his role as Private Secretary. In January 2019 he was created an Extra Equerry to The Princess Royal.
