= Battery Lothringen =

WWII fortification in Saint Brélade, Jersey

Batterie Lothringen
- Part of Atlantic Wall
- Noirmont Point, Saint Brélade, Jersey
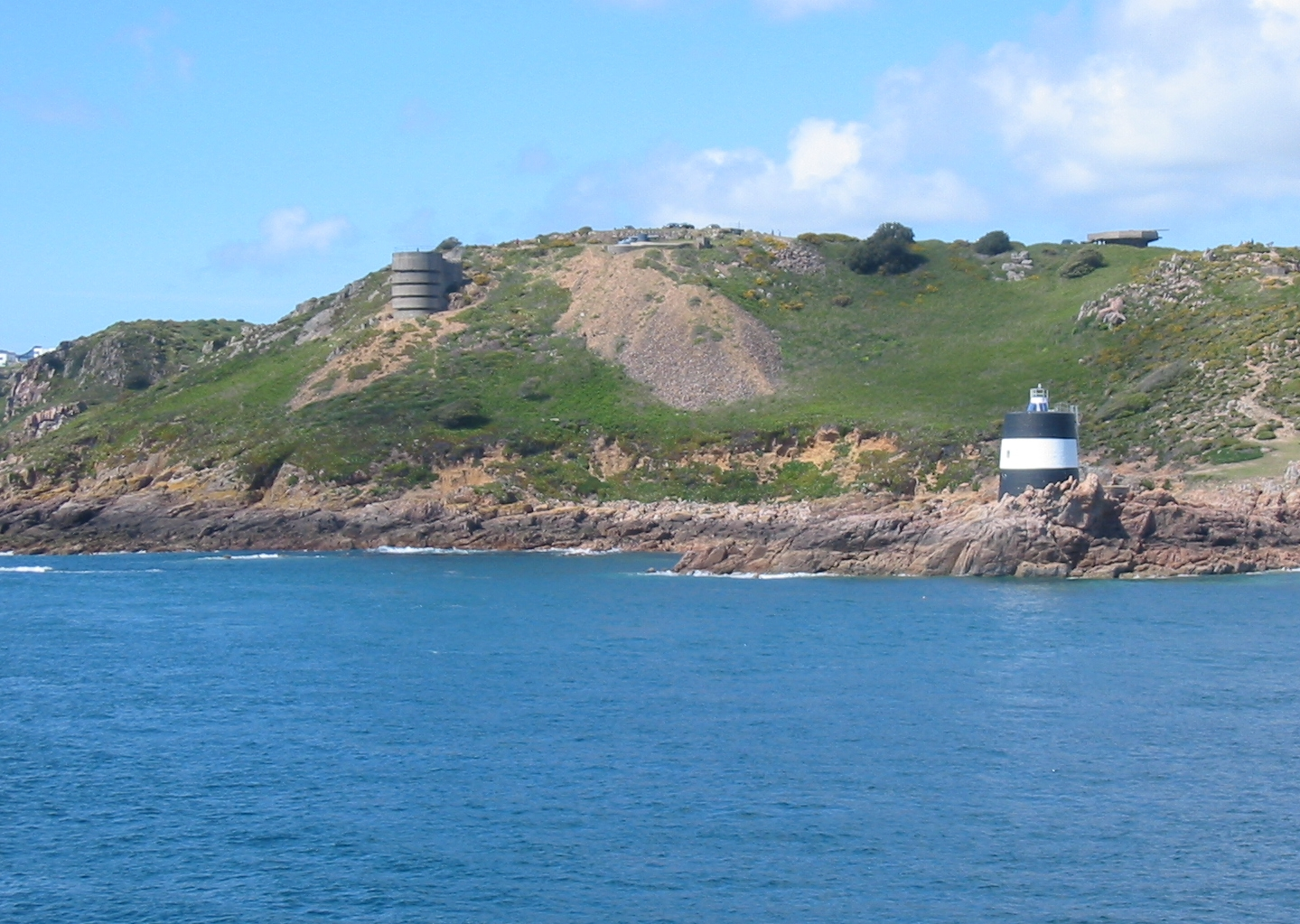
- Batterie Lothringen seen from the sea in 2009

- Kriegsmarine Ensign

Site information
- Owner: People of Jersey
- Open to the public: Yes
- Condition: Some structures restored, others ruined

Location
- Coordinates: 49.1675°N 2.1696°W

Site history
- Built: 1941
- Built by: Organisation Todt
- In use: 1941–45
- Materials: Concrete, steel and timber
- Events: German occupation of the Channel Islands

Garrison information
- Garrison: Kriegsmarine

Battery Lothringen was a World War II coastal artillery battery in Saint Brélade, Jersey, named after the SMS Lothringen, and constructed by Organisation Todt for the Wehrmacht during the Occupation of the Channel Islands. The first installations were completed in 1941, around the same time as the completion of the nearby Battery Moltke, in St. Ouen.

The battery is at the end of Noirmont Point, a rock headland which overlooks St. Aubin's Bay, Elizabeth Castle, and the harbours of Saint Helier. It was a part of the Atlantic Wall system of coastal fortifications, and most of the concrete structures remain today. The 3rd Battery of Naval Artillery Battalion 604 was stationed here.

The site overlooks the 19th century Martello tower of La Tour de Vinde.

== Naval guns ==
In 1941, the main guns in the battery were three 15 cm SK L/45 naval guns, with a fourth 15 cm SK L/45 installed later.

These guns were originally manufactured by Krupp and date from 1917.

The guns were placed on elevated concrete platforms. Ammunition was stored in nearby bunkers, and was manually transferred from the bunkers, via concrete footpaths, to smaller concrete storage bays at the guns.

After the Liberation of the Channel Islands, the guns were removed by the British Army, and discarded at the foot of the cliffs at Les Landes, in St Ouen.

=== Gun no. 1 ===
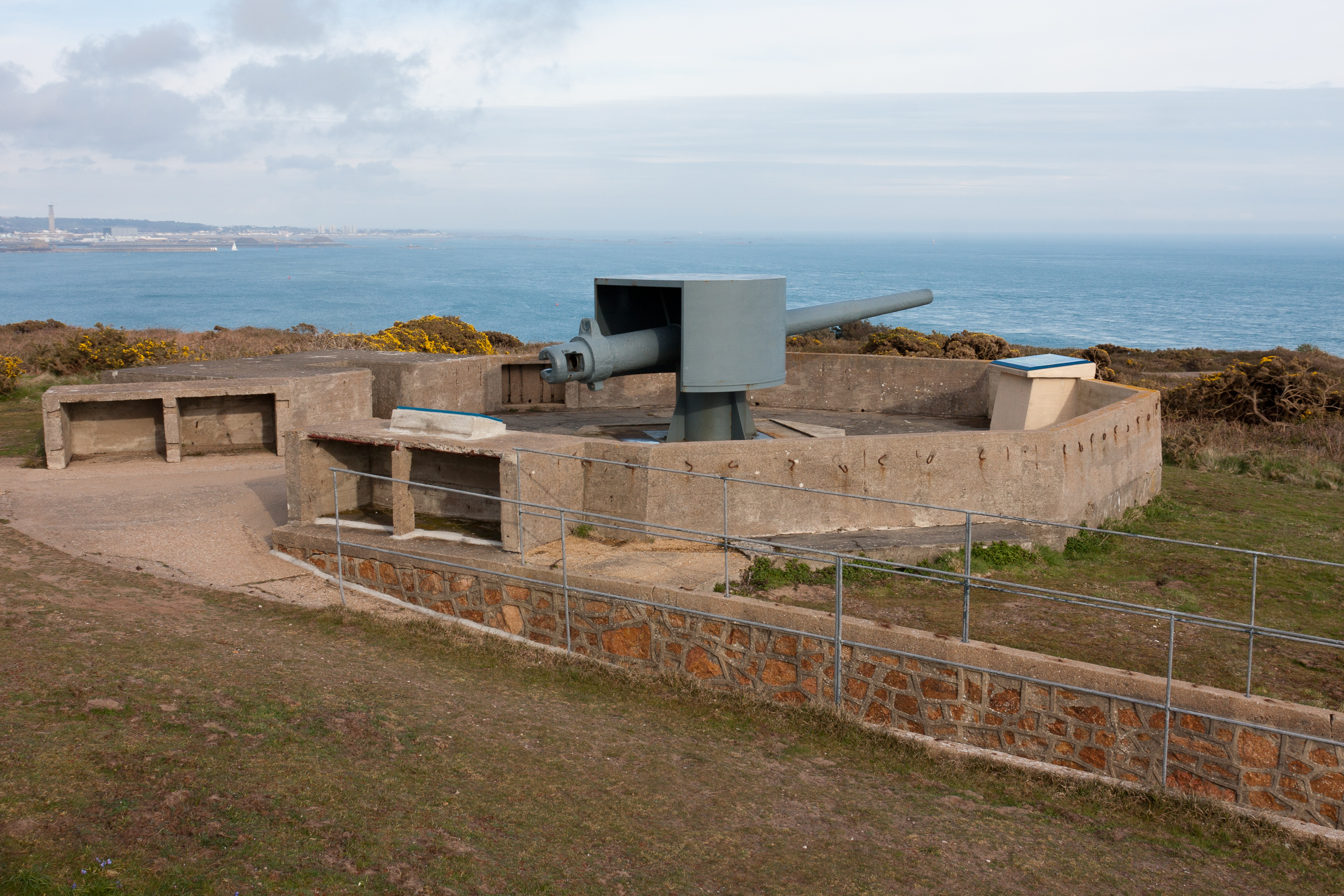
"Gun no. 1" in 2012. The path (right) leads down to Ammunition Bunker VII.

This gun was positioned on top of a walled concrete platform, with one access ramp, and a small room alongside the gun.

Ammunition was stored in Ammunition Bunker VII, and was manually moved from the bunker up to the gun, via a sloping concrete path, to be stowed upright in small bays, just to the rear of the gun.

To the rear of the platform, there was a barrack hut, an administrative building, and a personnel bunker. Only the bunker remains in 2012. To the east, was a latrine.

Electrical and communications services for this gun were linked to the command bunker.

In 1992, gun no. 1 was recovered and returned to Noirmont Point. The recovery work was completed in March 1998, by placing the cannon back on the gun platform, using a Chinook helicopter.

=== Gun no. 2 ===
In 1941, this gun was positioned on top of a concrete platform, to the north-east of the command bunker.

=== Gun no. 3 ===
Gun no. 3 was positioned on top of a concrete platform. The ammunition bunkers are not in close proximity to this platform, so extra storage bays were built below the platform.

In 2012, there is no gun at this position. A section of the platform wall is missing, due to demolition when the gun was removed.

=== Gun no. 4 ===
Gun no. 4 was positioned on top of a concrete platform.

== MP1 tower ==
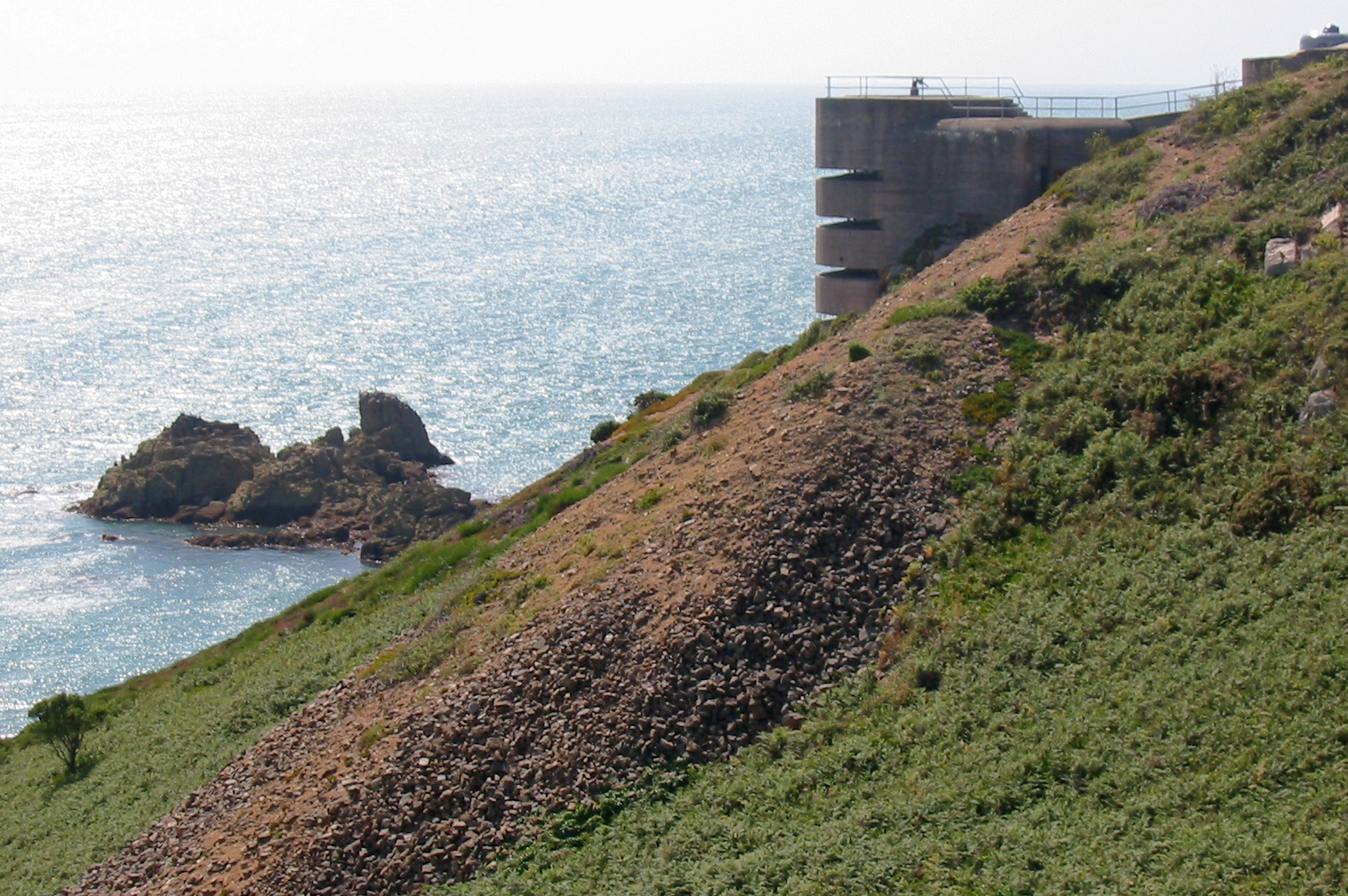
MP1 tower with panoramic views.

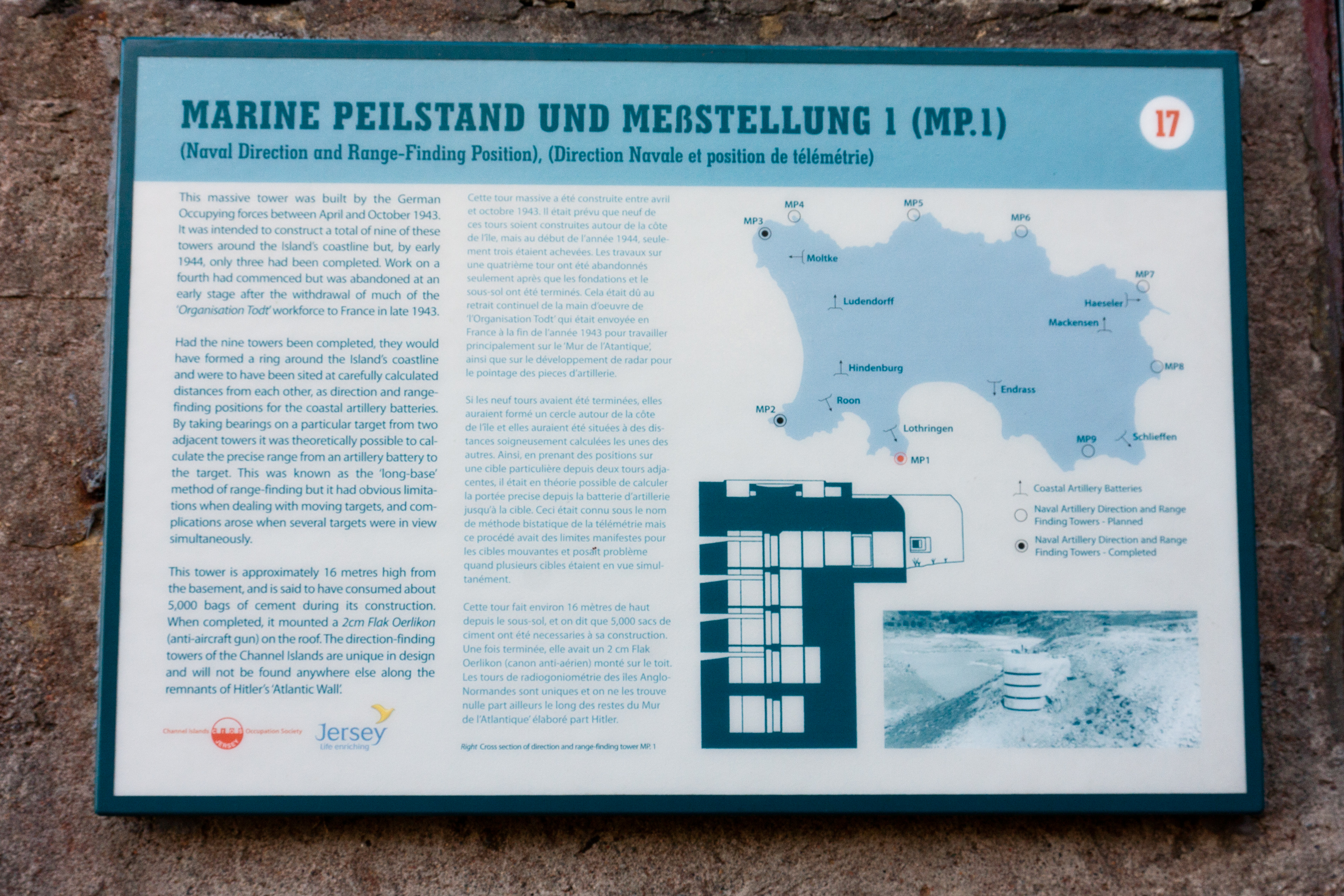
Plaque attached to the tower.

The Marine Peilstand 1 tower, or MP1 tower, was used to observe targets at sea. The round tower is around 16 metres (52 ft) tall, and has four observation floors, each with a wide, and narrow embrasure (for observation purposes only). Each of these floors was assigned to observe for one of the four 15 cm naval guns. The tower has five floors, including a windowless lower floor, plus a further open rooftop floor. Access is gained via a steel door, at the top floor, which is protected by an adjacent embrasure, suitable for small arms.

An Oerlikon 20 mm cannon was placed on the top of the tower for anti-aircraft purposes. In 2012, the gun is no longer present, but its steel support can be seen.

The tower, built between April and October 1943, is near the top of the steep sloping cliff, and extends no higher than the headland, which means its profile does not protrude into the sky when seen from afar. The visibility of the tower was reduced further using camouflage.

It is one of three completed direction and range finding towers, of this type, in Jersey. Nine towers were planned, but only towers 1 to 3 were built.

The towers were to be positioned around the entire coast of Jersey, so that any neighboring pair of towers could work together to pin-point a precise location of a target using triangulation. The position of the target would be passed on to the artillery, so that the gun could be rotated, raised or lowered to the correct orientation to fire upon that target.

=== Westwall type 101v bunker ===
This personnel bunker is adjacent to the tower. It was sealed and filled in after the Liberation, and was excavated from 2009, by the Channel Islands Occupation Society.

== Type M.132 Command bunker ==
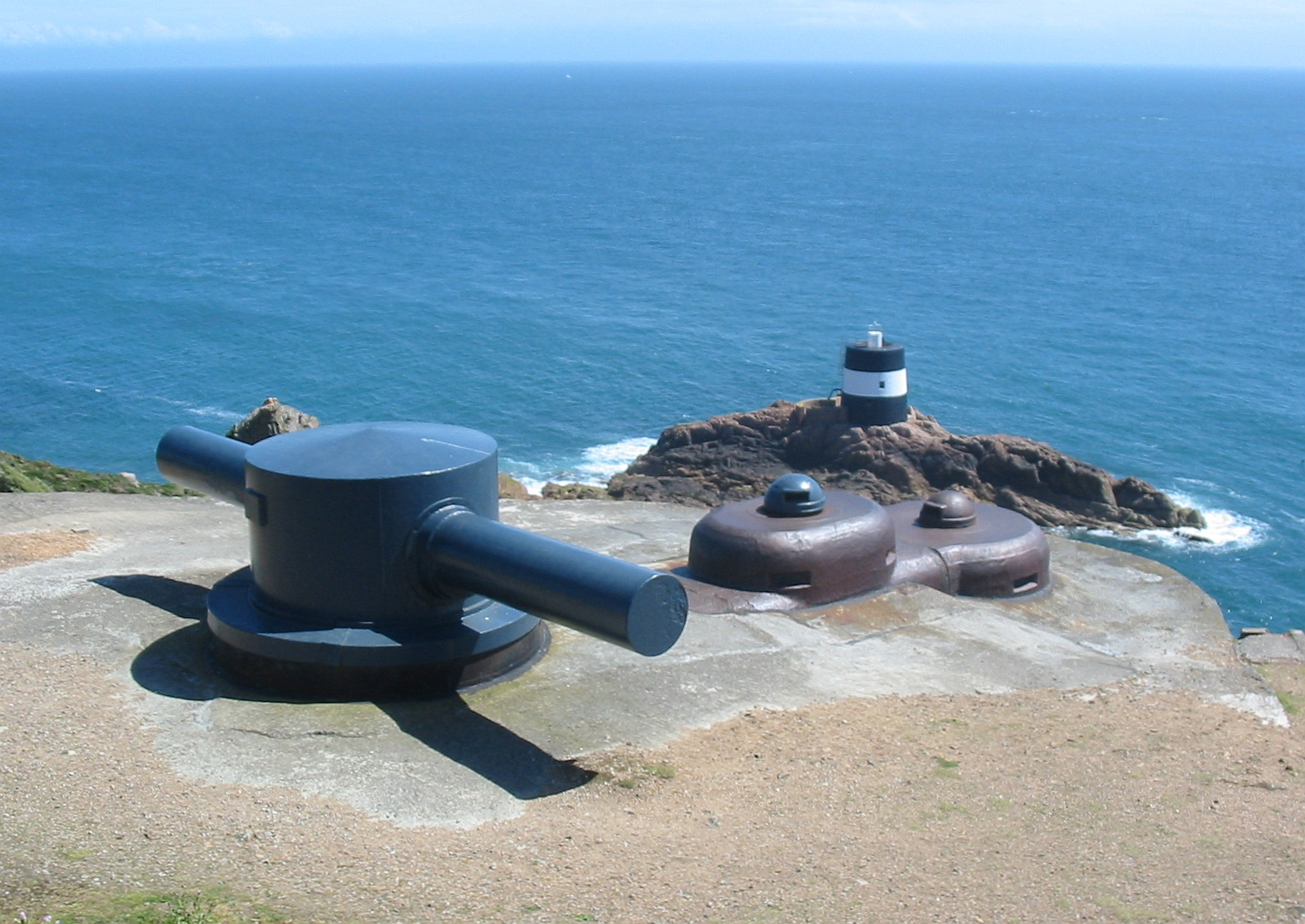
Command bunker at Battery Lothringen. The rangefinder (left), and cupolas (right).

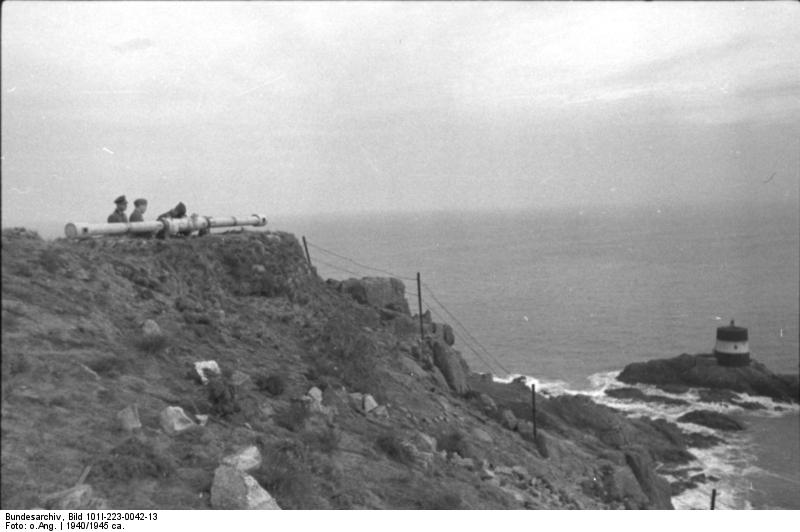
Only a rangefinder is visible in this photo taken in 1940. Photo appears to have been taken before the bunker was built

The command bunker is alongside the MP1 tower. It featured an armored naval rangefinder, and two steel observation cupolas. A periscope was used in conjunction with the rangefinder, to determine the direction of a target.

The bunker was built between March 1943, and May 1944. It has two floors, one entrance, and an escape shaft. It is constructed of reinforced concrete.

The lower-floor serves as a living area, and has nine chambers, which include quarters for troops, two rooms for officers, an administration room, a standby room, a room for a central heating plant, and a coal store. There is an escape shaft, which is accessible from the NCO's room. The upper-floor includes the operations room, washroom, toilets, first aid room, telephone exchange, and an escape shaft. The main entrance is on this floor, and is defended by two embrasures. The operations room provides underside access to the cupolas.

In 2012, only the arms of the rangefinder are original. They were recovered from the foot of the cliffs, restored and attached to a new turret.

This bunker has been restored and operates as a museum during the tourist season.

== Searchlights ==
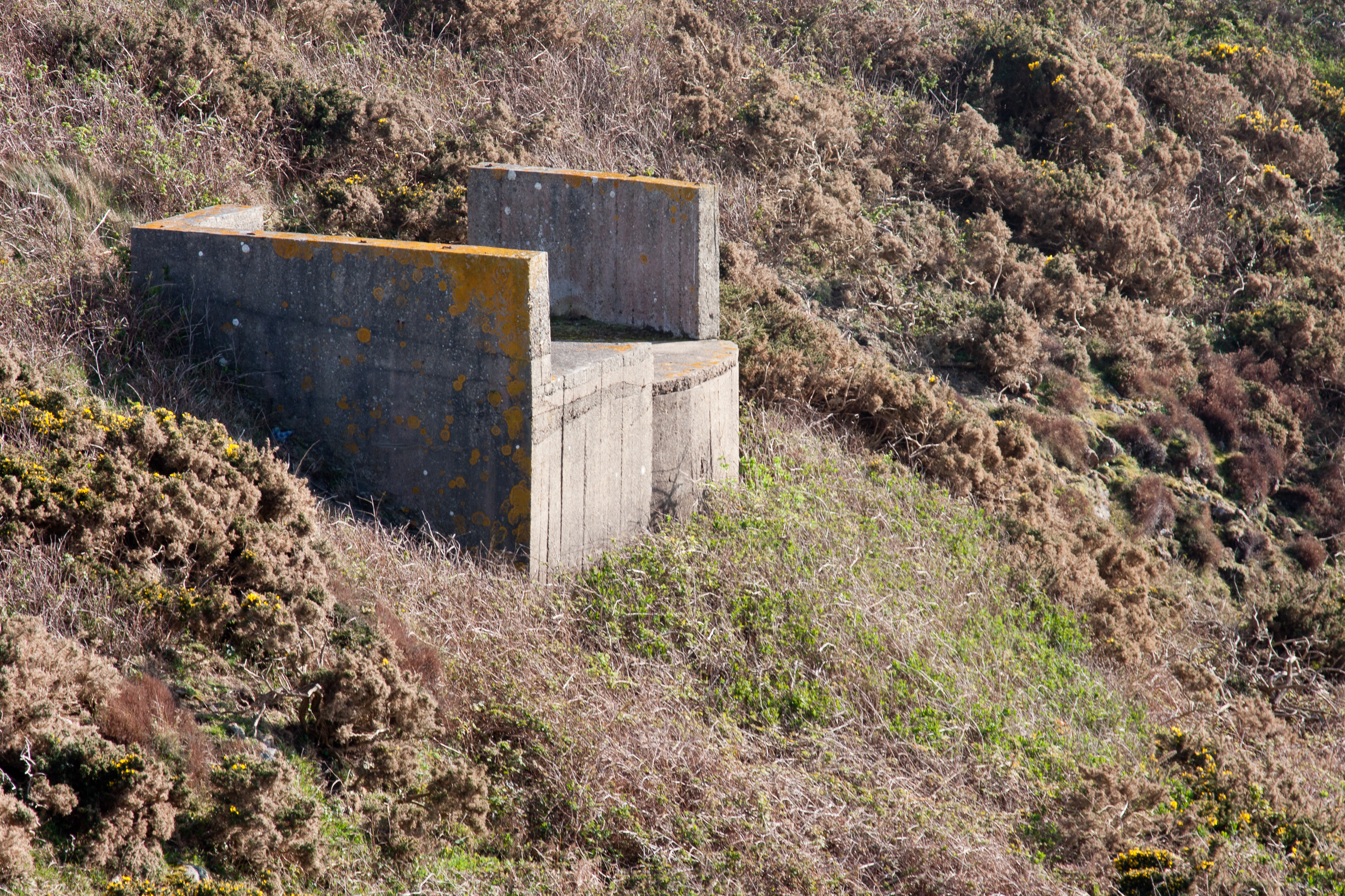
A searchlight platform, at Battery Lothringen, in 2012.

Two searchlights were installed, on concrete platforms, on either side of the headland. In 2012, only the platforms remain.

== Present day ==
In 2013, the headland site is fully accessible at all times, and there is a public car park at the end of the headland. Some of the installations and interiors are in a restored state, and can be visited at various times – usually on Sundays.

The gun emplacements can be visited at any time, including two partly restored guns, on display, at two of the gun platforms.

== Memorials ==
In 1950 the States of Jersey purchased the headland at Noirmont as a memorial to all those Jersey people who perished during the occupation. A memorial stone was unveiled at Noirmont on 9 May 1970 to mark the 25th anniversary of Liberation.

One of the bunkers has a plaque honouring two pilots of 263 Squadron who died on 7 December 1942 when they were shot down as they attacked a German convoy off the Point in their Whirlwind fighter-bomber.

There is a memorial to the 16 men of the US Navy's PT Boat Squadron 34 who died on 9 August 1944 when they attacked a German convoy ferrying guns from Guernsey to Jersey. Fourteen of the men were from PT 509, which rammed a German minesweeper escorting the convoy, and two were from PT503.

== See also ==
- German occupation of the Channel Islands
- Coastal fortifications of Jersey
