= Captain's clerk =

Former naval rating

A captain's clerk was a rating, now obsolete, in the Royal Navy and the United States Navy for a person employed by the captain to keep his records, correspondence, and accounts. The regulations of the Royal Navy demanded that a purser serve at least one year as a captain's clerk, so the latter was often a young man working his way to a purser's warrant. He had high status, with an office on the quarterdeck or upper deck on most ships. He was paid at the same rate as a midshipman in 1800, but by 1815 he had almost the same monthly pay as a standing warrant officer. On large ships, he had his own cabin in the gunroom, but on smaller vessels he lived with the midshipmen on the orlop deck.

== Duties ==
Once commissioned, a ship required a great deal of paperwork to keep her in good order. The recognized office staff consisted of captain's clerk, the purser, and the purser's steward. On most ships the first lieutenant was allowed a "writer" to help him draw up the watch and station bills, chosen from among the most literate landmen, otherwise the paperwork was done by the officers themselves. Occasionally the clerk had clerk's assistants, similar to how most warrant officers had mates.

In order to have his accounts passed at the Admiralty, a captain had to present at least 25 different completed books and forms. Some were quite simple, such as a copy of his commission, others were complex, such as the two copies of the log book or the muster book which had to be sent periodically. The main job of the captain's clerk was to prepare these documents, and to copy out the general correspondence of the captain. The captain's clerk worked closely with the purser, especially regarding the muster book which was used to determine how much to feed the crew.

== End of rating ==
By 1837, a Royal Commission sat for the purpose of determining the modes of promotion and retirement for naval officers, and one of their recommendations was to reduce the number of pursers, and to create an examination for clerks and all rated ships were to carry two clerks, one of which, a "passed clerk", had passed the examination. By 1852, the rank of purser was renamed Paymaster of the Navy, a distinct rating of Clerk's Assistant was created, for boys between 15 and 18, who took the same examinations on entry as naval cadets and had to serve for two years in the rank prior to promotion to clerk. A "passed clerk" was appointed by commission and ranked with a mate, while clerk and clerk's assistants were appointed by order in the same way as midshipmen and cadets, and continued to live in the gunroom or midshipmen's berth. In 1855, passed clerks received the title Assistant Paymaster, and in 1918, the rating Clerk disappeared when the paymasters received new military titles. Assistant Paymasters became Paymaster Sub-lieutenants, Clerk became Paymaster Midshipmen and Assistant Clerks, Paymaster Cadets.

== United States Navy ==
Clerk was an official rating of the United States Navy beginning in 1794 and clerks for commanders of naval vessels were termed the captain's clerk. The rating initially were paid slightly more than a midshipman and master's mates, reflecting a similar status aboard ship and with their counterparts in the Royal Navy. In 1835 the rating was disestablished and renamed yeoman, and unlike the Royal Navy evolved into a petty officer specialty not a type of commissioned officer.

President Andrew Jackson's "special confidential agent" Edmund Roberts embarked on the USS Peacock in 1832 and was rated as the captain's clerk, on his way to serve as envoy to Cochin-China.

== See also ==
- Warrant Officer
- Purser
