= Supply officer (Royal Navy) =

Historical British navy speciality

Supply officer was a specialisation in the British Royal Navy which was superseded by the logistics officer in 2004, recognising the need to align with the nomenclature and function of similar cadres in the British Army and Royal Air Force. Though, initially, employment of logistics officers in the Royal Navy remained broadly the same, it has begun to reflect exposure to the 'tri-service' environment, including a significantly greater number of operational logistics posts, as well as the more traditional cash, pay and records, and 'outer-office' or aide-de-camp duties. The Logistics Branch in the Royal Navy is one of the three main branches of the Senior Service, though due to its unique nature has interaction with all branches of the Naval Service, including the Fleet Air Arm and the Royal Marines, as well as the Defence Equipment and Support Organisation, the Ministry of Defence and many other agencies and organisations. In centuries past, the supply officer had been known as the clerk, bursar, purser and, later, the paymaster. Logistics officers are still generally referred to by the historic sobriquet 'pusser', a derivation of 'purser'.

== History ==
=== Purser and secretary ===
At first, the business-man and shop-keeper – later to become responsible for pay as well – this officer was first mentioned as a regular member of a ship's company in one of the King's Ships in the fourteenth century. Later known as the clerk and then bursar in the Royal Navy, the name of this warrant officer soon changed to purser. In the early days, the purser was a privileged shop-keeper on board ship and, as such, the profession was guilty of many malpractices. Samuel Pepys said of the purser "A purser without professed cheating is a professed loser."

By the end of the seventeenth century, a new post of captain's clerk was ordained and all pursers had to pass through this office; this resulted in promotion to the post of purser largely resting with ship's captains. Gradually, the status of the purser rose and he received the uniform of a warrant officer in 1787 and a distinctive uniform in 1805. The oldest man in the British fleet at the Battle of Trafalgar, 21 October 1805, was the purser of Nelson's flagship, HMS Victory, Limerick-born purser Walter Burke, then 69; he survived a further ten years, dying in September 1815 and his gravestone is in Wouldham churchyard, Kent. Admiral Nelson's secretary, John Scott, was killed at Trafalgar; his body was sliced in two by a cannonball, while he was talking with Captain Hardy on the quarterdeck, and his body parts were thrown over the side.

In 1808 the senior warrant officers – the purser, the master (later navigating lieutenant) and surgeon – were officially recognized as "Warrant Officer of wardroom rank". It had long been the custom for Royal Navy flag officers to select as their secretaries "pursers of talent and approved character" and the purser's other role as a secretary was generally formalised by 1816. The purser became formally responsible in 1825 for the payment of the ship's company.

=== Paymaster ===
The title of purser transformed into the "purser and paymaster" in 1842, and the warrant officer rank was elevated to commissioned officer in 1843. The title of purser finally disappeared in 1852 and he became the paymaster.

In 1855 the status of these officers was clarified by Order in Council. They were to be "Accountant officers for cash to the Accountant-General of the Navy ..." and the ranks of assistant paymaster, clerk, and assistant clerk emerged. In 1864, these officers were authorised to wear a white strip of distinction cloth between the gold rings on their arms.

By 1867, it was laid down that a paymaster of 15 years' seniority should rank with a commander and in 1886 followed the distinction between fleet paymaster (ranking with commander) and staff paymaster (ranking with Lieutenants of 8 years' seniority). A paymaster-in-chief ranked with a four-stripe captain.

In March 1918 a paymaster-in-chief was appointed paymaster director-general and, on 8 November 1918, the then paymaster director-general, William Whyte, was given the rank and style of paymaster rear-admiral. At the same time, the branch's other ranks were standardized: a paymaster-in-chief became paymaster captain; fleet paymaster became paymaster commander; staff paymaster became paymaster lieutenant-commander; paymaster became paymaster lieutenant; assistant paymaster became paymaster sub-lieutenant; clerk became paymaster midshipman and assistant clerk became paymaster cadet. Paymaster rear-admiral was established as a rank in its own right by Order in Council of 20 December 1919 applied retroactively to 6 March 1918.

=== Supply officer ===
On 26 October 1944 the whole accountant branch name was changed from paymaster to supply and secretariat, and the word paymaster was dropped from its place in front of the rank, e.g. a paymaster commander became a commander (S). As with their paymaster predecessors, supply officers were employed, ashore and afloat, as a ship's supply officer, with responsibility for ratings from the writer branch, the stores and victualling branches, cooks and officers' stewards and, if borne, the NAAFI canteen manager.

They were also employed, ashore and afloat, as admiral's secretary, commodore's secretary and captain's secretary. It was not uncommon for a secretary to follow the same senior officer from one post to the next and, sometimes, a secretary in the substantive rank of lieutenant commander would be promoted acting commander and then temporary captain – thus, such a lieutenant commander would be listed as temporary acting captain.

== Lists, promotion and entry ==
With the formation of the Royal Navy's General List (GL) in 1956, supply officers no longer wore the white distinction cloth between the gold lace on their uniform and became indistinguishable from officers of the executive branch or the engineering branches. However, pursers in the British Merchant Navy and the Royal Fleet Auxiliary continue to wear a white distinction cloth.

The General List (GL) of 1956 standardized the promotion opportunities of its officers, regardless of branch, although there remained some minor differences. Thus, a lieutenant of eight-year's seniority was automatically promoted to lieutenant-commander, with retirement generally at age 50 unless promoted to a higher rank; and for supply officers, commanders were selected from lieutenant-commanders of at least three-and-a-half-year's seniority, and retired at age 53; captains were promoted from among commanders with at least six years in the rank. Captains retired on reaching nine-year's seniority in the rank, or at age 55, whichever was the earlier, unless selected for promotion to rear-admiral. Commodore was, until 1996, reserved for a few senior appointments but is now a formal rank achieved by selection from captain. GL supply officers were thus able to serve in a much wider range of appointments, such as shore command, naval attaché, intelligence; indeed none of the posts held by the six serving supply officer admirals in 1991 would have been open to a pusser before 1956.

The substantive rank of lieutenant-commander had been formally introduced in March 1914. However, in 1875, senior lieutenants of eight years' standing began to be distinguishable to the naked eye from his more junior brother; he was, in that year, allowed to add to his full dress uniform the now well-known "half-stripe" of quarter-inch gold lace between the two distinctive rings of half-inch braid which the ordinary lieutenant wore, and by 1877 he could wear it in undress uniform too. "Senior Lieutenant" had thus become a rank in all but name. From 1914, promotion to lieutenant-commander was automatic on reaching eight years' seniority as a lieutenant though, in around the year 2000, this has changed and the "half-stripe" is now achieved only by selection.

Supply branch ratings had, in common with ratings from other branches of the Royal Navy, long been offered the opportunity of promotion from the lower deck. There were two avenues of receiving a commission. The Upper Yardman scheme (entering Britannia Royal Naval College (BRNC), Dartmouth, Devon, as a cadet or midshipman, under terms similar to those direct from civilian life) was open to those supply branch ratings under the age of about 25. Such ratings were called CW candidates, and they were specially reported on for selection to attend the Admiralty Interview Board before final selection for promotion and entry to BRNC.

The second avenue of promotion from rating to commissioned officer was to the Special Duties (SD) List. Petty officers and chief petty officers could, with the approval of their commanding officer, become a CW candidate (an 'SD candidate') and such supply branch senior ratings were similarly specially reported on with a view to promotion to officer, generally between the ages of 28 and 35, though most were in their early 30s when promoted to acting sub-lieutenant on the Special Duties List. Unlike GL and SL (see below) officers, SD officers retained their former rating branch specialisation; for example the supply officer (cash) of a large warship or shore establishment would typically be a lieutenant (SD)(S)(W), the (W) indicating that he is a commissioned officer from the Writer branch of ratings. SD officers were, of course, promoted from all supply branches – writer (W), stores assistant/accountant (S) or (V), cook (CK), officer's steward/steward or caterer (CA). Once confirmed as a sub-lieutenant, an SD officer was promoted lieutenant after three years; promotion to lieutenant-commander (SD) was by selection and, from these, a very small number were promoted to commander from 1966 onwards. Retirement was generally compulsory at age 50. A few SD officers were further selected for transfer to the General List, seniority being adjusted on transfer, so as to level the promotion opportunities (generally these officers were earmarked as likely to reach the rank of commander). In the 1970s, to make up for certain branch shortages, some chief petty officers, age over 35, from the supply branch were selected and promoted temporary acting sub-lieutenant (SD), a few of whom were later promoted to temporary lieutenant (SD). By the 1980s, supply officers were no longer necessarily being appointed according to the List they were on (GL, SD or SL); it was not uncommon to find, in different ships in the same squadron or flotilla, a pusser in supply charge from each List.

Prior to the introduction of the Special Duties List in 1956, some senior ratings were selected for promotion to warrant officer on the Branch List, with subsequent possible promotion (from 1864) to commissioned warrant officer; from 1946, officer rank was achieved by commission rather than by warrant. Of the old "standing officers" (the master, boatswain, gunner and carpenter) from the days of sail, the cook was the first to lose his status as a full-blown warrant officer and head of his own department; indeed, an order of 1704 helped him in his downward career as, in future, in the appointment of cooks, the Navy Board was "to give the preference to such cripples and maimed persons as are pensioners of the chest at Chatham". Warrant officers lived in a separate mess – the gunroom – from Wardroom officers and, by the 1800s, wore one thin stripe of gold sleeve lace with, from 1864, for supply branch officers, the white distinction cloth below. The warrant officer's dress uniform was instituted in 1787. In all other respects they were treated as for commissioned officers. A commissioned warrant officer wore the same sleeve lace as a sub-lieutenant – one gold stripe proper; these officers lived in the Wardroom mess.

Between the 1950s and 1990s, recruitment targets for supply officers were generally met, no doubt owing in part to the slightly lower standards for eyesight – executive officers were not recruited if they needed any corrective lenses but supply officers were. Thus there was no real need for a Supplementary List (SL) of supply officers and it was not until 1966 that the Admiralty Board introduced a scheme for SL supply officers. Even then, SL(S) was exclusively for a maximum of three supply branch ratings each year on the Upper Yardman scheme; there was no direct recruitment from civilians as a Supplementary List pusser, though this appears to have been introduced in the 1990s. Supplementary List officers were offered 10-year short-service commissions, with the opportunity to extend to 16 years and beyond, should the exigencies of the Service require; promotion to lieutenant-commander (SL)(S) was by selection and only one officer from this scheme was promoted to commander (SL)(S) – commander J R (Russ) Cameron on 1 October 1993. SL supply officers, like other branch SL officers, were afforded the opportunity to transfer to the General List by selection.

As at 31 March 1996, there were 575 supply officers, male and female, of all lists and ranks, from midshipman to rear-admiral, serving in the Royal Navy (source: The Navy List 1996 (HMSO)). Three were rear-admirals, 26 captain (S) and 85 commander (S) and some 28 (lieutenants (S) and above) were qualified as barristers. In 1998, the General, Special Duties and Supplementary Lists were abolished, all officers being on one, common, List. The Navy List of 2006 lists 581 logistics officers, of whom 131 are women: there is one rear-admiral, 3 commodores, 20 captains, 97 commanders, 154 lieutenant-commanders, 249 lieutenants, 56 sub-lieutenants and one midshipman; 78 of the male officers had qualified as a submariner and 26 of the branch as barristers. There were 500 logistics officers serving (all ranks, both genders) on 1 April 2013, some 12.4% of the 6,180 officers of the Royal Navy and Royal Marines.

== Supply officer renamed logistics officer ==
In early 2004 the supply officer became the logistics officer, though the function is largely unchanged. The careers page on the Royal Navy's website in 2006 described the duties:

"As a Logistics Officer you will play an essential role in the overall logistics support for the Royal Navy, whether at war, reacting to an international crisis, protecting offshore resources or taking part in search and rescue missions. You will manage your department's delivery of equipment, accommodation, food and other vital services in providing the necessary logistic support, which is critical to the effective operation of the Navy's ships, submarines and shore establishments. A Logistics Officer's wider responsibilities will also include the provision of professional advice on policy, personnel, legal or accountancy matters, which are also key elements in the smooth running of a modern fleet ... A major aspect of your job involves managing people and those in your department would include Chefs, Caterers, Stores Accountants, Stewards and Writers. Because of your specialist knowledge you are also often the most appropriate officer to offer advice to those with domestic or other personal problems. As you are responsible for the Ratings in your division, they may ask you for representation in any disciplinary or appeals procedures".

== Supply officers in other navies ==
The Royal Australian Navy and the Royal New Zealand Navy both have supply officers who are broadly similar in employment to those of the Royal Navy and the Royal Canadian Logistics Service is also a sister branch. For some history of the United States Navy equivalents, see Navy Supply Corps.

== Naval slang for the supply officer ==
Naval slang has produced a variety of names for the supply officer. When in "supply charge" he/she is called the "pusser" (a contraction of "purser") and the term "pusser" is used as an adjective, in a variety of contexts, to refer to something that is strictly disciplined, or Service, such as "pusser's issue" and "pusser's rum". Also, a supply officer may be referred to as the "SO" and he/she is sometimes described as belonging to the "white mafia" (referring to the historic white distinction cloth worn until 1956). Rather less common now is the nickname "Pay" (being short for paymaster) and its lower-deck equivalent of "Paybob". Those supply officers appointed as a secretary to an admiral or captain may be referred to as "Sec", "Inky Fingers" or "Scratch" (from the scratching of his/her pen). In the classic film In Which We Serve (1942), Captain D's secretary, a lieutenant-commander, appears in the opening frames; in the credits actor John Varley is listed as "Secco".

== Life as a paymaster and supply officer ==
One paymaster cadet's account of life on board HMS Hood The career of Captain (S) Hugh Rump (1901–1992) gives an idea of a pusser's career in the Royal Navy from 1919 to 1955.

During the First Battle of Narvik, in the Norway campaign, the destroyer leader HMS Hardy (captain Bernard Warburton-Lee RN) was attacked by German destroyers in Ofotfjord on 10 April 1940, and captain (D) was seriously wounded and most other officers were killed. Captain (D)'s secretary, paymaster lieutenant Geoffrey H. Stanning survived and he awoke from the fearful blast to find his spine and legs badly injured by shrapnel, the ship out of control and heading for the shore at thirty knots. Since the wheel house was below him and nobody was answering his increasingly desperate orders to put the wheel over, he managed to drag himself down a ladder to the wheel house and alter course, enough to stop hitting the shore. When he regained the bridge helped by some seamen, he saw that they were now heading for two German destroyers. Since he could not slow down he decided to ram one of them. Luckily for all those left alive on board, whilst he was deciding which one to have a go at, one of the boilers was hit and the engines ground to a halt. All the forward guns on the Hardy were by now inoperable, but one of the stern guns was still banging away at the Germans who naturally returned fire into the burning wreck. Luckily the Hardy still had some 'way' on her which allowed Stanning to manoeuvre her into Vidrek where she ran aground. As she glided ashore still blazing furiously Stanning gave the order to abandon ship. One hundred and forty men plunged into the icy water, and in between the shell bursts from the German destroyers, managed to clamber to safety on the shore. Captain Warburton-Lee was awarded a posthumous Victoria Cross and paymaster lieutenant Stanning the DSO. and the Supplement to the London Gazette of 1 July 1947.

== Training and employment since 1950 ==
Owing to a shortage of Fleet Air Arm pilots in the 1950s, four supply officers qualified as fixed-wing pilots; both Brian Brown and Andrew Richmond rose to flag rank in the 1980s. There was a similar, but short-lived, scheme in the late 1960s when at least three supply officers were trained as helicopter aircrew; at least one "pusser pilot" served in a number of flying appointments.

The three-month junior supply officers' course (JSOC) was undertaken, certainly from 1973, by all junior supply officers before their first appointment; this became the initial logistics officers' course (maritime) – ILOC (M) – in January 2004. From May 1963, the three-month supply charge course (SCC) prepared senior lieutenants for their first appointment as supply officer (head of department) in a destroyer, frigate or ocean-going survey ship (the supply officer was often the junior head of department); SCC became the advanced logistics officers course (maritime) – ALOC(M)) – in January 2004 and the professional logistics command course (maritime) – PLCC(M) – in September 2010. All training takes place at what was the Royal Naval Supply School (RNSS), since 2004 the Defence Maritime Logistics School (DMLS). The first WRNS officer was appointed to SCC in April 1980 and civilian officers of the RNSTS or Director General Supply and Transport (Navy) civil servants were occasional students, sometimes going to sea for a short familiarization afterwards.

Typically, in the 1970s and 1980s, a commando carrier such as HMS Bulwark would have nine supply officers on board led by a commander (S), including two borne for the duties of captain's secretary – a lieutenant-commander and captain's assistant secretary – a lieutenant or sub-lieutenant. A County-class guided missile destroyer had three supply officers on board, one as captain's secretary, and a Leander-class frigate, Hecla-class survey ship and nuclear submarine just the one supply officer in "supply charge", usually a senior lieutenant (S), with a junior seaman officer given the additional role of "correspondence officer". A frigate squadron leader had a lieutenant-commander as squadron supply officer and a junior lieutenant or sub-lieutenant as captain's secretary. Supply officers rarely served in ships with a ship's company of fewer than 100. some supply branch captains and commodores have been appointed in command of large naval shore establishments such as HMS Cochrane, HMS Nelson, HMS Raleigh and HMS Terror.

In the 1980s, one former submariner supply officer served successfully as first lieutenant (executive officer) of a frigate. From 2004 to 2007, lieutenant-commander (commander from 2006) Heber Ackland served as equerry to Her Majesty Queen Elizabeth II.

== Barristers ==
Unlike the other armed forces, the Royal Navy has no separate uniformed legal branch. The Director Naval Legal Services (DNLS) is the Navy's senior lawyer. A few supply officers are trained as barristers and one captain (S) serves as Chief Naval Judge Advocate (CNJA). In the Navy List 2006, 26 male and female logistics officers were listed as barristers.

Although much of their time can be spent in criminal cases at courts martial, military lawyers are also required in all major operational theatres as legal advisers to the commanding admiral or general. The Navy legal service also covers employment law, liability of public authorities and the drafting of Acts of Parliament. As of 2010, service lawyers could expect to rejoin their original branch of service every few years (e.g. Naval ships, Royal Marine Commandos), to maintain a sense of balance.

In 1979 the then CNJA (captain David Williamson) was invited to sit in the Crown Court as a deputy circuit judge (later the title became deputy recorder). Others followed in his trail and some continued judicial activity after their retirement from the Active List of the Royal Navy. By the mid-1990s, two captains (S) and a commander (S) who retired from the Royal Navy were appointed as civilian circuit judges: [Shaun] Lyons,[John L] Sessions and [A G Y (Tony)] Thorpe; Robert Fraser was appointed a circuit judge on his retirement as commodore in 2007.

Officers from other naval branches have also trained as barristers. Commander Maxwell Hendry Maxwell-Anderson, formerly a navigating lieutenant, was counsel for the Admiralty in the Prize court during World War I, dealing with prize money cases arising from the sinking of enemy ships. He was Chief Justice of Fiji from 1929 to 1936, while still serving on the retired list.

== Additional duties at sea ==
With the advent of flight decks in destroyers, frigates and ocean survey ships built in the 1960s and subsequently, it became common for supply officers in these ships to be trained as ship's flight deck officers, responsible for helicopter landing and take-off, though this is no longer the case; logistics officers' 'war-role' is now solely as damage control officer (DCO), with control of the ship's fire-main and manpower deployed to fight fires or control floods. Other additional duties performed by supply officers include those of watchkeeping officers in nuclear submarines and damage control officers.

== Admirals and head of branch ==
Only two supply officers have ever been promoted to the rank of 'full' admiral. Retiring as chief of fleet support in 1977, Admiral Sir Peter White GBE (born 1919) was promoted on 28 June 1976, becoming the first of the branch to be appointed to the Admiralty Board. Admiral Sir Brian Brown KCB, CBE was promoted to that rank on 26 August 1989.

Twelve supply officers and one logistics officer rose to the rank of substantive vice-admiral (see list of admirals below), of whom two were further promoted to admiral; two others were promoted to acting vice-admiral in the late 1940s. In recent decades, among the officers of flag rank in the Royal Navy, at any one time one, two or three supply officers have been rear-admirals. One of these two-star officers is appointed chief naval supply and secretariat officer (CNSSO) – now CNLO – as head of branch; however, there was no admiral in the Logistics Branch from 2008 to 2010 and the senior officer branch was a commodore. Rear-admiral David Steel, a barrister, was promoted to two-star rank on 20 April 2010 and became naval secretary and chief naval logistics officer (CNLO); he was promoted to vice-admiral in October 2012 on becoming Second Sea Lord, only the second officer from the branch to hold that post. A commander of the Royal Naval Reserve (RNR) is head of the RNR Logistics Branch.

== Women ==
Women officers in the Women's Royal Naval Service (WRNS) would often serve ashore as a captain's secretary but rarely as a supply officer. After the disbanding of the WRNS in 1993, women were fully integrated into the Royal Navy's supply branch, with the wearing of gold stripes instead of blue stripes; for female naval supply officers, service at sea, as well as ashore, started to become the norm. Indeed, Commodore Carolyn Stait OBE FCIPD was the naval base commander, Clyde in from 2004 to 2007.

== Defence Maritime Logistics School, RN Logistics School and RN Supply School – history ==
The present Defence Maritime Logistics School (DMLS), (until September 2006 the Royal Naval Logistics School (RNLS)) – the alma mater of logistics officers and ratings – is a lodger unit within HMS Raleigh in Torpoint, Cornwall PL11 2PD. Functionally however, the school exists as a 'franchise' of the Defence College of Logistics and Personnel Administration, whose headquarters reside in Deepcut, Surrey. The Commandant of the DMLS is Commander Suzi Nielsen RN. From 1 April 1958 to 1983 the RN Supply School (RNSS) was in HMS Pembroke, Chatham, Kent ME4 4UH. Previously the RNSS was in Thorp Arch, Wetherby, Yorkshire, the training establishment being known as HMS Ceres from 1 October 1946 to 31 March 1958 and before that as HMS Demetrius, which had commissioned on 15 July 1944 as the Accountant Branch school. The school had transferred from its former wartime home in Highgate School, London N6, where it had been established as HMS President V since being requisitioned and commissioned on 1 November 1941 as the training school for Accountant Branch ratings. The boys of Highgate School had been evacuated from London owing to The Blitz. (Thorp Arch became a borstal when the Navy left in 1958 and it is now known as HM Young Offenders' Institution, Wetherby, LS22 5ED).

== Prizes and awards ==
There are some naval examination prizes available to supply officers. The Gedge Medal and Prize was instituted in about 1928 and is awarded annually to the student who has obtained the highest aggregate of marks in their academic examinations in the current year.

== Supply officers with separate articles in Wikipedia ==
Not mentioned above, these supply officers have a separate entry, or are mentioned in another article, in Wikipedia:

- Richard Aylard
- Sir Ronald Brockman
- Sir Norman Denning
- Alan Hardaker – football administrator
- Duncan Lustig-Prean and Beckett v United Kingdom
- Charlotte Manley
- Edward Travis (later Sir Edward Travis) – operational head of Bletchley Park Feb 1942 to Apr 1952
- Nicholas Peter Wright

== Sources ==
1. England's Sea-Officers by Michael Lewis (George Allen & Unwin, 1948)
2. Shore Establishments of the Royal Navy by Lt Cdr Ben Warlow RN (Maritime Books, 2000)
3. The Pusser and His Men by Ben Warlow (Ministry of Defence (DFSD), 1984)
4. The Navy List (HMSO yearbook)
5. Royal Navy website
6. King's College London's Liddell Hart Centre for Military Archives
7. Who's Who 1998
