= Battery Moltke =

WWII fortification on Jersey

- Part of Atlantic Wall
- Les Landes, St Ouen, Jersey
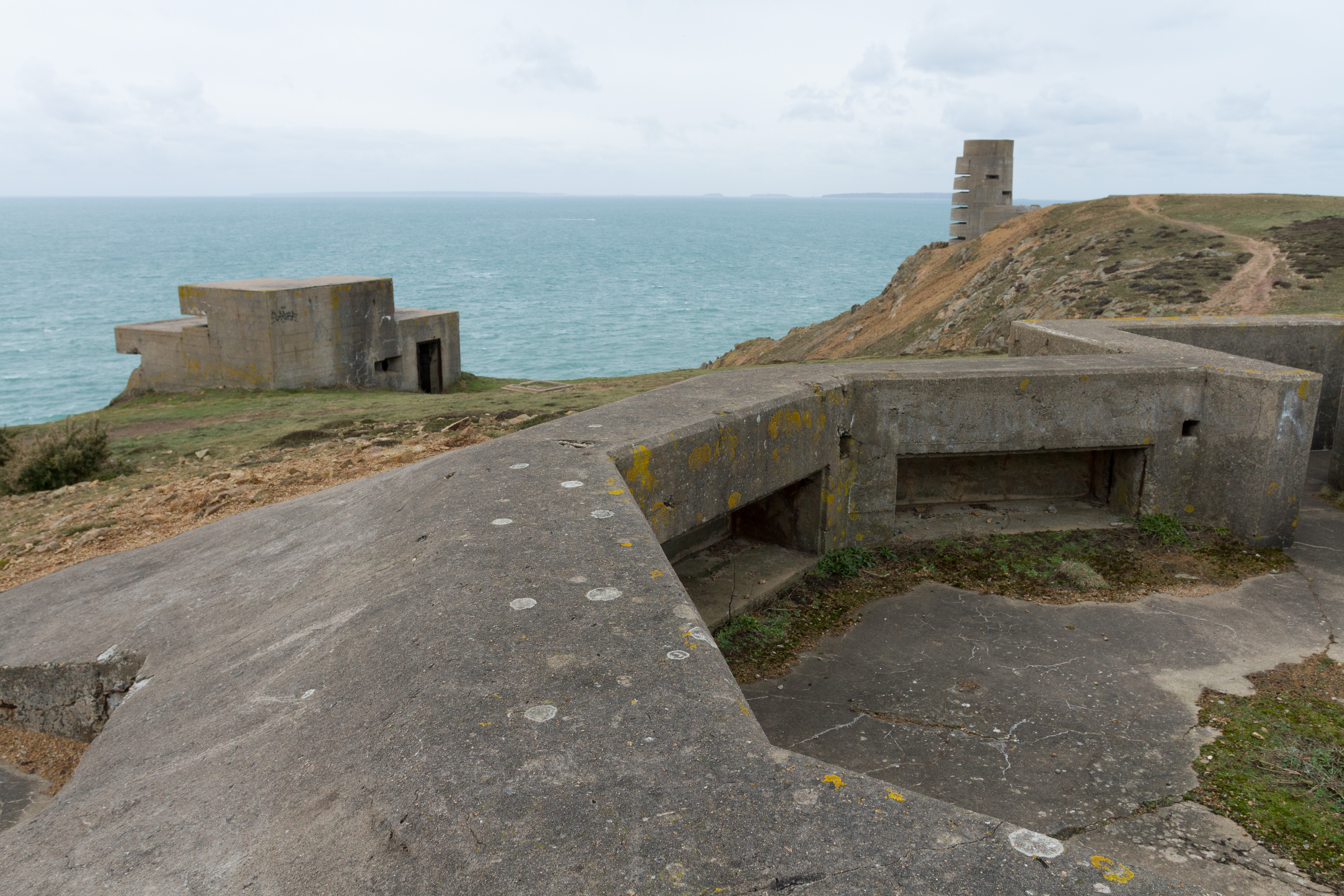
- Battery Moltke seen in 2013

- Kriegsmarine Ensign

Site information
- Owner: People of Jersey
- Open to the public: Yes
- Condition: Some structures restored, others ruined

Location
- Coordinates: 49.2479°N 2.2512°W

Site history
- Built: 1941
- Built by: Organisation Todt
- In use: 1941-45
- Materials: Concrete, steel and timber
- Events: Occupation of the Channel Islands

Garrison information
- Garrison: Kriegsmarine

Battery Moltke (Batterie Moltke in German) is an uncompleted World War II former coastal artillery battery in St Ouen in north-west Jersey. It was constructed by Organisation Todt for the Wehrmacht during the occupation of the Channel Islands.

The battery structures include bunkers, gun emplacements and the Marine Peilstand 3 tower, which are on Les Landes, a coastal patch of heathland at the north end of St Ouen's Bay. The bunker was left unfinished at the end of the war. When completed there would have been an M132 Command Bunker as at Battery Lothringen and the main armament would have consisted of four 15 cm SK C/28 naval guns.

The primary purpose of this battery would have been the defence of St Ouen's Bay in the event of an amphibious assault by the Allies, although Jersey's entire coastline would have been within range of the guns, as would the stretch of water between Jersey and Sark.

== Gun emplacements ==
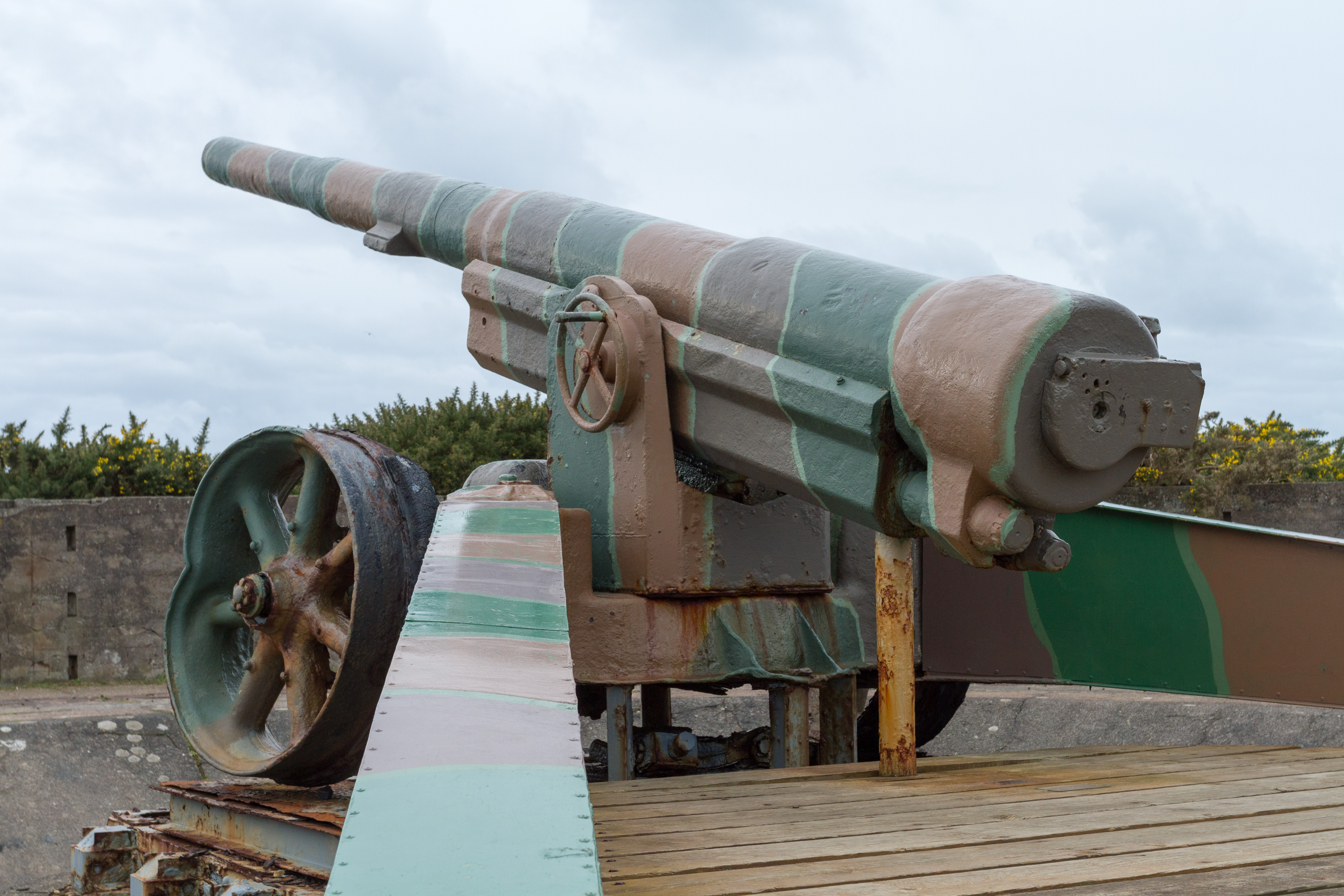
A 15.5 cm K 418(f) at Battery Moltke in 2013

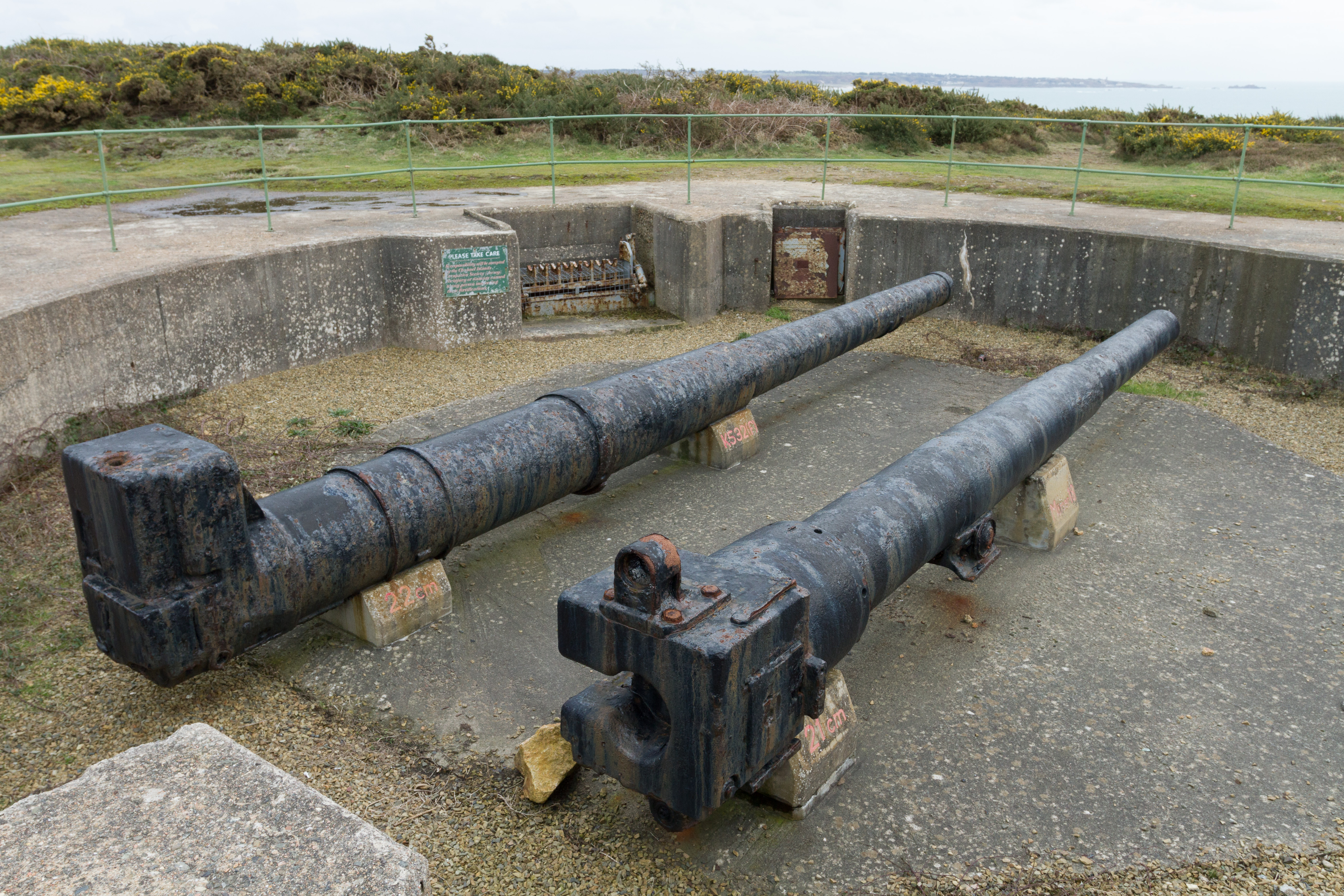
Gun emplacement at Battery Moltke, Les Landes, Jersey. The guns are a 21 cm Mörser 18 on the right, and an ex-French 22 cm K 532(f) on the left.

Four captured French Canon de 155mm GPF, known as the 15.5 cm K 418(f) by the Germans, were installed at Moltke. One of the original guns can be seen there today. These guns could be fully rotated to fire in any direction. They had a maximum range of around 19,500 m.

The French guns were intended to be temporary until more modern 15 cm SK C/28 guns could be delivered; these guns never arrived.

== MP3 tower ==
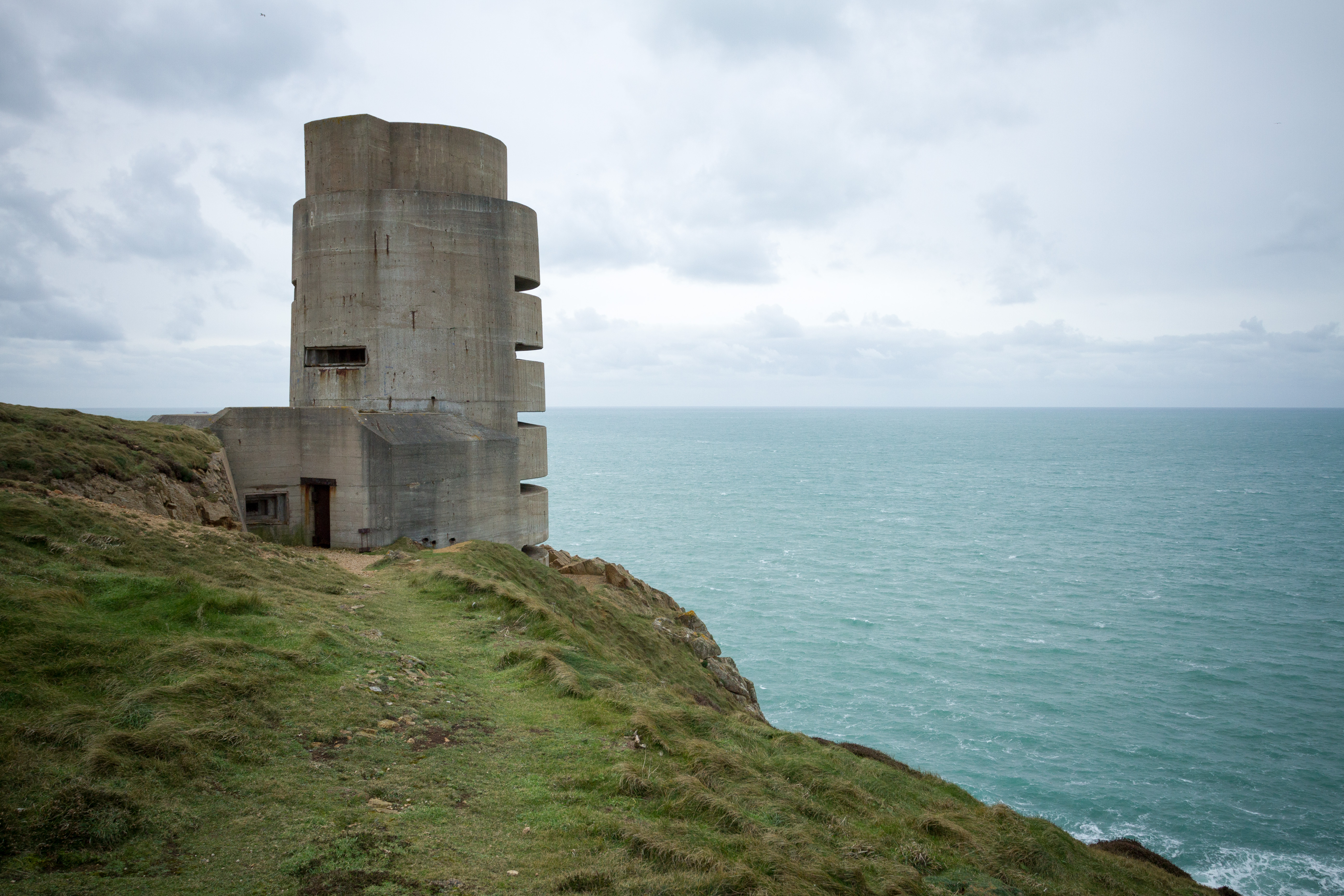
Marine Peilstand 3

The Marine Peilstand 3 tower, or MP3 tower, is one of nine planned towers, in Jersey, for use in observing targets at sea. It is similar to the other two completed towers of this type (MP1 at Saint Brelade and MP2 at La Corbiere).

The tower is at the top of a steep sloping, west-facing cliff. It has seven floors including a windowless underground floor and the walled top deck where a Seetakt radar was installed. The land-side entrance is on the third level.

== Ringstände ==
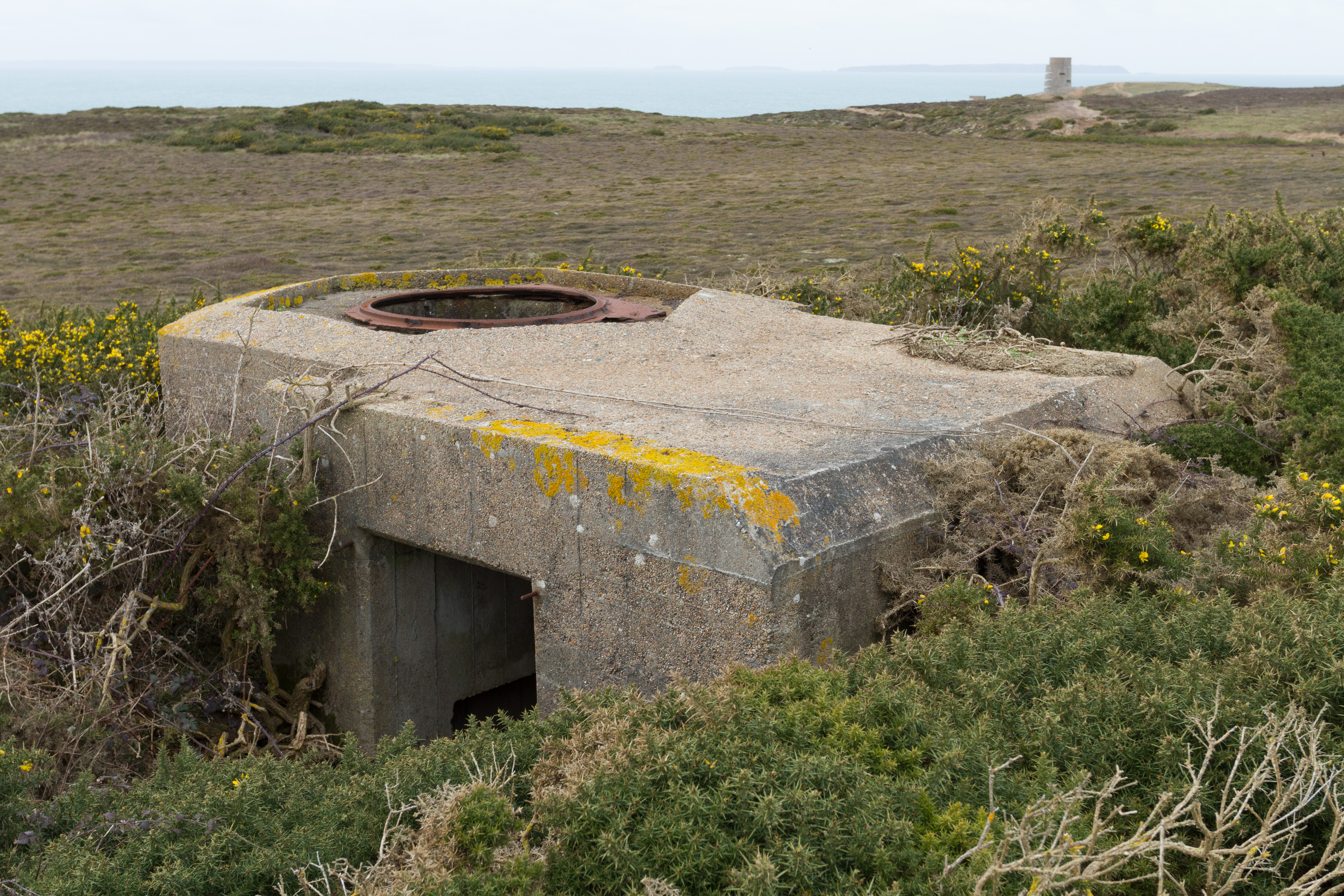
One of the Ringstände which was built to accommodate the turret from a captured Renault FT-17

Examples of Ringstände can be found at the battery site. These are a type of defensive fighting position known as Tobruk by the Allies, and are small bunkers constructed from concrete with an aperture on the top which was used to mount a turret from an otherwise obsolete tank.

== Present day ==
In 2013, the exterior areas of the site are accessible at all times. The Channel Islands Occupation Society operates some of the bunkers as a museum.

One may visit the gun emplacements at any time. Two cannon barrels recovered from the foot of the nearby cliffs are on display in one of the emplacements. These two salvaged barrels were not originally at Moltke.

== See also ==
- Battery Lothringen
