= Logistics officer =

A logistics officer is a member of an armed force or coast guard responsible for overseeing the support of an army, air force, marine corps, navy or coast guard fleet, both at home and abroad. Logistics officers can be stationary on military bases or deployed as an active part of a field army, air wing, naval force or coast guard fleet. The responsibilities of Logistics Officers vary, depending on where they are deployed and what tasks they are assigned. In addition, different countries have different roles for Logistics Officers. The main role of these officers remains the same regardless of where they are stationed; to ensure that the force is supplied with enough food, water, fuel, ammunition and other goods and services to complete the task at hand.

== Australia ==
In Australia each of the three independent Services of the Australian Defence Force (ADF) have different definitions for a 'Logistics Officer'. Logistics officers lead and coordinate planning and execution of the operations support components of the military effects which include the administrative (1) and logistics (4) functions, as well as major enabling support in the capability support dimension of force generation.

Royal Australian Navy (RAN) logisticians are called a supply officer, the commissioned element of the Supply Branch. RAN "Loggies" conduct the non-technical component of 1/4 support effects.

Australian Army logisticians are commissioned officers in the Australian Regular Army (ARA) or Army Reserve (ARES) normally drawn from the Ordnance (RAAOC), Transport (RACT), Catering (RAACC), Engineer (RAE), Electrical and Mechanical Engineer (RAEME), or Medical (RAAMC) corps. Army defines engineering as a subset of logistics.

Royal Australian Air Force (RAAF) logisticians are called Logistics Officers (LOG), the commissioned element of the Logistics Employment Group (LEG). As in the RAF they are generally focused on the maintenance of the supply chain (in both Joint and Air environments), equipment governance, catering, movements and transport, the non-technical logistics disciplines. Unlike the Army RAAF "Loggies" work in parallel to RAAF engineers (Aeronautical [AERO], both Ground and Air Electrical [ELECTR], Armament [ARM] and Airfield [AFENG]) who comprise the specialist technical engineering and maintenance components of the RAAF integrated logistics workforce. LOG and ENG personnel (except AFENG) are managed by Logistics Branch - Air Force within Air Force Headquarters (AFHQ). AFENG are managed by the RAAF's Headquarters Combat Support Group. Additionally unlike their Navy and Army counterparts RAAF "Loggies" don't manage administrative, personnel or finance functions which are provided by Administrative Officers (ADMIN) who perform the 1 shop functions of the 1/4 support environment leaving "Loggies" to perform the 4 shop function.

== Belgium ==
In Belgium, the army has its own logistics branch. This branch is responsible for supporting the army in the wide logistics spectrum: supply, maintenance, movement & transport and contracting.

== Canada ==
Logistics officers with the Canadian Coast Guard are responsible for a wide variety of duties that help maintain the operation of a vessel. They work closely with the commanding officer to coordinate the administration of the ship's financial resources. Logistics officers are responsible for purchasing, receiving, storing and issuing of all materials for the ship and any other offshore military establishment. This includes professional training in techniques and practices of accounting, budgeting, forecasting, cost/benefit and risk analysis. Furthermore, logistics officers with the Department of National Defence work in five main disciplines: Human Resource Management, Supply Chain Management, Finance, Food Services and Transportation and have the opportunity to specialize as movement, postal or ammunition technical officers. Logistics Officers in the Canadian Armed Forces are assigned to one of the three services branches, and while each branch requires specialized knowledge unique to the particular operational environment, Logistics Officers are expected to be capable of serving in any operational role when required.

== Russia ==
Logistical Support of the Russian Armed Forces

== United Kingdom ==
In the United Kingdom, a logistics officer in the Royal Air Force is colloquially known as a 'Stacker' (which is an abbreviation of 'Blanket Stacker') or simply as a 'loggie'. This is a reference to the traditionally-held perception of the role of the logistics officer. In the Royal Navy a Logistics Officer is known colloquially as a "Pusser", derived from the term "Purser". In the Army the logistics officer is often referred to as the Quartermaster.

== United States ==
In the United States, the work of the logistics officer includes providing strategic, operational, or tactical level logistical support and managing the overall logistic processes in support of mission objectives; leveraging existing networks and expanding others; anticipating mission requirements and operational requirements and offering alternatives and advice; and evaluating, redesigning and implementing logistics processes for mission support.

The National Logistics Officer Association, while founded by United States Air Force maintenance officers, now serves as the primary professional organization dedicated to the professional development of logistics officers from all United States armed forces.
