= Gunroom =

Room on a naval vessel or in an English country house

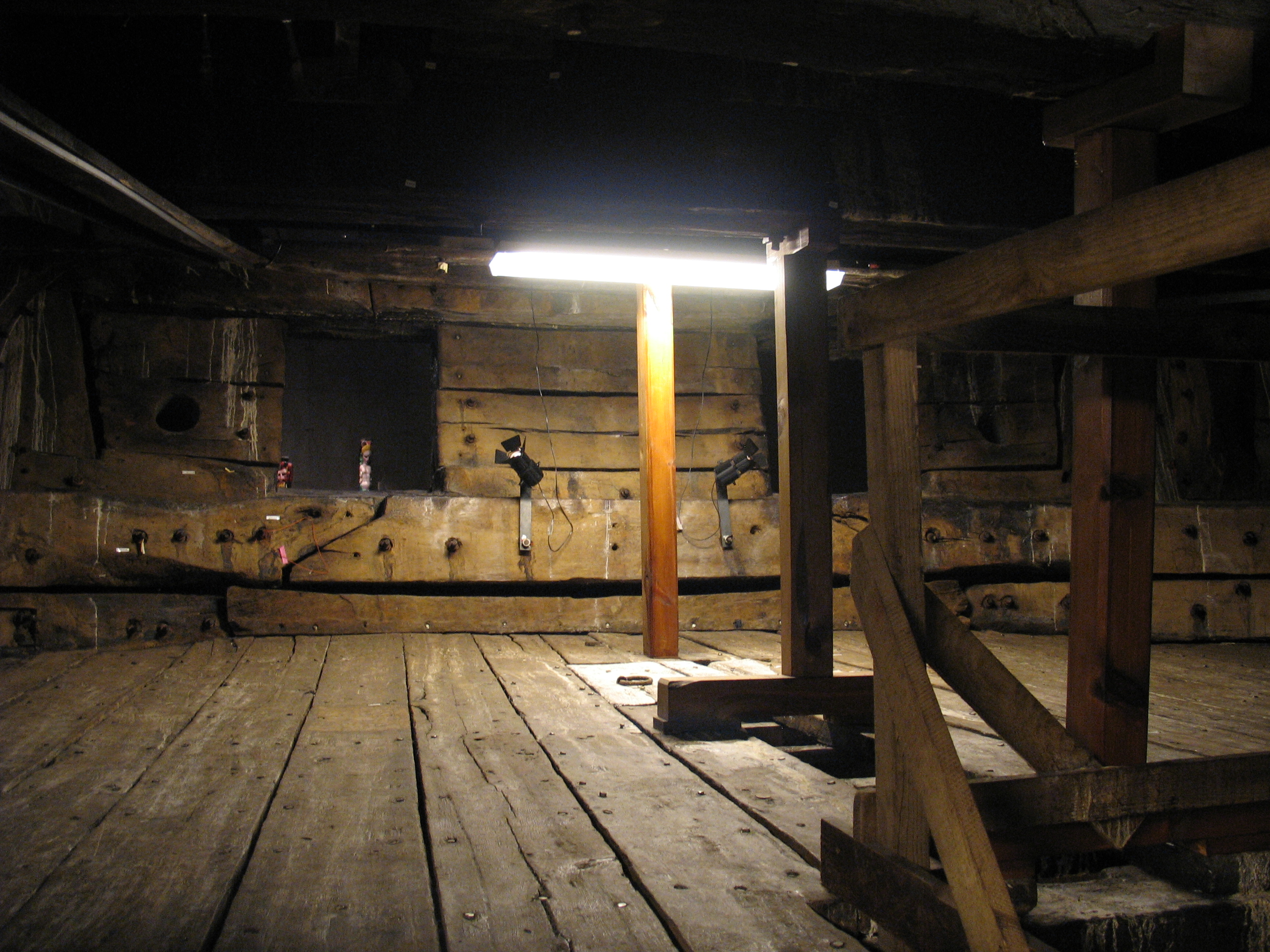
The aft gunroom on the Vasa

A gunroom is the junior officers' mess on a naval vessel. It was occupied by the officers below the rank of lieutenant. In wooden sailing ships it was on a lower deck, and was originally the quarters of the gunner, but in its form as a mess, guns were not normally found in it. The senior officers' equivalent is the wardroom.

In large ships of war, the gunroom was a compartment originally occupied by the gunner and his mates, but now fitted up for the accommodation of the junior officers; in smaller vessels, that used as a mess-room by the lieutenants.

In an English country house, the gunroom is a secure walk-in vault in which sporting rifles, shotguns, ammunition and other shooting accessories are kept. They are locked away partly for security, partly as some makes such as Holland & Holland or Purdey are highly valuable (costing as much as £60,000 for shotguns and £100,000 for rifles and with a 2- to 3-year waiting list from order to delivery).

== See also ==
- Magazine (artillery)
