= List of Royal Navy rear admirals =

Rear Admiral (RAdm) is a flag officer rank of the British Royal Navy. It is immediately superior to Commodore and is subordinate to Vice Admiral. It is a two-star rank and has a NATO ranking code of OF-7.

The rank originated in the days of naval sailing squadrons and each naval squadron would be assigned an Admiral as its head. He would command from the centre vessel and direct the activities of the squadron. The admiral would in turn be assisted by a vice admiral, who commanded the lead ships which would bear the brunt of a naval battle. In the rear of the naval squadron, a third admiral would command the remaining ships and, as this section of the squadron was considered to be in the least danger, the admiral in command of the rear would typically be the most junior of the squadron admirals. This has survived into the modern age, with the rank of rear admiral the most-junior of the admiralty ranks of many navies.

List of Royal Navy Rear-Admirals

- Nicholas Ingram (1754–1826)

== List of rear admirals ==
Promoted	Name	Born	Died	Notes promoted
20 February 1799	Alexander Edgar	1736	1817	Retired upon death
1830	Sir Frederick Lewis Maitland, KCB	1777	1839	
1840	Sir Alexander Dundas Young Arbuthnott	1789	1871	Promoted Vice Admiral in 1858
1846	Sir Francis Beaufort, KCB	1774	1857	Retired upon death
1848	Peter John Douglas	1787	1858	Promoted Vice Admiral in 1855
2 April 1866	Sir William Legge George Hoste, Bart.	1818	1868	Promoted Vice Admiral
2 April 1866	John Fulford	1809	1888	Retired list in April 1870; promoted Vice Admiral on the Retired list in 1872
2 April 1866	Sir Alfred Phillipps Ryder, KCB	1820	1888	Promoted Vice Admiral in 1872
2 April 1866	Sir Henry Chads, KCB	1819	1906	Promoted Vice Admiral
2 April 1866	Francis Scott, CB			
2 April 1866	Sir Adolphus Slade, KCB	1804	1877	Retired list in 1867; promoted Vice Admiral on the Retired list in 1873
2 April 1866	Sir Arthur Farquhar, KCB	1815	1908	promoted Vice Admiral
2 April 1866	Edwin Clayton Tennyson-d'Eyncourt	1813	1903	Retired list in 1870; promoted Vice Admiral on the Retired list.
2 April 1866	Thomas Henry Mason, CB	1811	1900	promoted Vice Admiral in 1873.
28 May 1867	Charles Hillyar	1817	1888	promoted Vice Admiral in 1873.
11 June 1874	Sir George Ommanney Willes, GCB	1823	1901	promoted Vice Admiral.
11 June 1874	John O. Johnson			Retired List on the same day 11 June 1874.
11 June 1874	Matthew Stainton Nolloth			on the Retired list since before promotion
11 June 1874	Alexander B. Becher			on the Retired list since before promotion
11 June 1874	Henry Gage Morris			on the Retired list since before promotion
11 June 1874	Richard D. White			on the Retired list since before promotion
11 June 1874	Alan H. Gardner, CB			on the Retired list since before promotion
11 June 1874	William John Samuel Pullen		1887	on the Retired list since before promotion; promoted Vice Admiral on the Retired list.
11 June 1874	Honourable George H. Douglas			on the Retired list since before promotion
11 June 1874	George Le Geyt Bowyear, CB	1818	1903	on the Retired list since before promotion; promoted Vice Admiral on the Retired list.
11 June 1874	James Dirom	18	18	on the Retired list since before promotion
11 June 1874	Henry Croft	18	18	on the Retired list since before promotion
11 June 1874	Frederick A. B. Craufurd	18	18	on the Retired list since before promotion
1870s	Hubert Campion, CB	1825	1900	on the Retired list since 1870.
6 January 1888	Sir Charles Frederick Hotham, GCB, GCVO	1843	1925	Promoted Vice Admiral in 1893.
1888	James Augustus Poland	1832	1918	On the Retired List since 1886; Promoted Vice Admiral on the Retired list in 1893.
5 August 1890	Sir Charles George Fane, KCB	1837	1909	Promoted Vice Admiral in 1896
29 January 1891	Francis Durrant, CMG			
1 January 1892	Claude Edward Buckle	1839	1930	Promoted Vice Admiral in 1897
1892	James Albert Bedbrook	1845	1902	Retired 1901
17 January 1892	Richard Duckworth-King	1840	1900	Promoted Vice Admiral in 1897
17 January 1892	Arthur Cecil Curtis			on the Retired list since before promotion
14 February 1892	Sir Harry Holdsworth Rawson, GCB, GCMG	1843	1910	Promoted Vice Admiral in 1898
14 February 1892	Victor Alexander Montagu, CB	1841	1915	on the Retired list since 1885
20 February 1892	Robert Hornby Boyle	1840	1892	
20 February 1892	Henry Nelson Hippisley	1839	1894	on the Retired list the same day
20 February 1892	Richard George Kinahan	1837		on the Retired list since before promotion; Promoted Vice Admiral on retired list in 1898
20 February 1892	Francis Richard Blackburne	1835	1902	on the Retired list since 1890; Promoted Vice Admiral on retired list in 1898
25 February 1892	Sir Cyprian Arthur George Bridge, GCB	1839	1924	Promoted Vice Admiral in 1898
25 February 1892	Richard Henry Napier	1836	1903	on the Retired list since 1890; Promoted Vice Admiral on the Retired list in 1898
26 March 1892	Edmund Charles Drummond	1841	1911	Promoted Vice Admiral in 1898.
5 April 1892	Charles Searle Cardale	1841	1904	Promoted Vice Admiral in 1899
1 January 1893	Edmund John Church	1842	1904	Promoted to Vice Admiral in 1899
1 January 1893	Walter Stewart, CB	1841	1896	Retired list on 20 October 1896
1 January 1893	Sir John Reginald Thomas Fullerton, GCVO, CB	1840	1918	Promoted to Vice Admiral in 1899
1 January 1893	Charles Barstow Theobald	1843	1905	Retired list on 5 August 1893; Promoted to Vice Admiral on the Retired list in 1899
13 May 1893	Sir Ernest Rice, KCB	1840	1927	Promoted Vice Admiral in 1899
13 May 1893	Uvedale Corbet Singleton, CB	1838	1910	on the Retired list since 1891
28 May 1894	Arthur Hildebrand Alington	1839	1925	Retired list on 13 January 1899; promoted Vice Admiral on the Retired list in 1901
28 May 1894	Henry John Fletcher Campbell, CB	1837	1914	on the Retired list since before promotion
28 May 1894	John Graham Job Hanmer	1836		on the Retired list since before promotion
1895?	Henry John Carr	1839	1914	Retired list on 6 July 1899; promoted Vice Admiral on the Retired list in 1901
1 January 1895	Charles Lister Oxley	1841	1920	Promoted Vice Admiral in 1901.
1 January 1895	Sir Robert Hastings Harris, KCB, KCMG	1843	1926	Promoted Vice Admiral in 1901.
1 January 1895	Sir Hugo Lewis Pearson, KCB	1843	1912	Promoted Vice Admiral in 1901.
1 January 1895	Sir John Fellowes, KCB	1843	1913	Promoted Vice Admiral in 1901.
1 January 1895	Noel Stephen Fox Digby	1839	1920	on the Retired list since 1893.
1 January 1895	Henry Salmond	1838	1895	on the Retired list since 1887.
1 January 1895	Sir William James Lloyd Wharton, KCB	1843	1905	on the Retired list since 1891.
1 January 1895	Henry Harvey Boys	1839	1914	on the Retired list since 1894; Promoted Vice Admiral on the Retired list in 1901
20 February 1895	Charles Cooper Penrose-Fitzgerald	1841	1921	Promoted Vice Admiral in 1901.
22 June 1895	Sir Arthur Knyvet Wilson, Bt, VC, GCB, OM, GCVO	1842	1921	Promoted Vice Admiral in 1901.
9 November 1895	Sir Archibald Lucius Douglas, GCB, GCVO	1842	1913	Promoted Vice Admiral in 1901.
9 November 1895	Leicester Chantrey Keppel	1837	1917	on the Retired list since before promotion
9 November 1895	Hector Brabazon Stewart		1922	on the Retired list since 1892
9 November 1895	Martin Julius Dunlop	1844?	1911	on the Retired list since 1894; Promoted Vice Admiral on the Retired list in 1901
19 January 1896	William Home Chisholme St Clair	1841	1905	Promoted Vice Admiral in 1901
11 March 1896	Atwell Peregrine Macleod Lake	1842	1915	Promoted Vice Admiral in 1901
11 March 1896	John Borlase Warren	1838	1919	on the Retired list since 1893; Promoted Vice Admiral on the Retired list in 1901
11 March 1896	Henry Compton Aitchison	1844	1901	on the Retired list since 1889
11 March 1896	Richard Frederick Britten	1843	1910	on the Retired list since 1892
8 May 1896	Sir Gerard Henry Uctred Noel, GCB, KCMG	1845	1918	Promoted Vice Admiral in 1901
16 July 1896	John Whitmarsh Webb			on the Retired list since before promotion
10 October 1896	John William Brackenbury, CB, CMG	1842	1918	Promoted Vice Admiral in 1901.
20 October 1896	Sir Thomas Sturges Jackson, KCVO	1842	1934	Promoted Vice Admiral in 1902.
20 October 1896	Sir Adolphus Augustus Frederick FitzGeorge, KCVO	1846	1922	on the Retired list since 1893.
20 October 1896	Arthur Cecil Henry Paget	1839	1924	on the Retired list since 1893.
9 November 1896	Richard Horace Hamond	1843	1906	Retired list; Promoted Vice Admiral on the Retired list in 1902
9 November 1896	John Edward Stokes	1838		on the Retired list since before promotion
9 November 1896	Frederick Wilbraham Egerton	1838		on the Retired list since 1885
23 February 1897	Sir Arthur Dalrymple Fanshawe, GCB, GCVO	1847	1936	Promoted Vice Admiral in 1902
10 May 1897	Sir Day Hort Bosanquet, GCMG, GCVO, KCB	1843	1923	Promoted Vice Admiral in 1902
10 May 1897	Capel Wodehouse	1841		on the Retired list since 1886
10 May 1897	John Ingles			on the retired list since 1897
10 May 1897	Sir John Hext, KCIE	1842	1924	on the Retired list since 1889
23 August 1897	Sir Lewis Anthony Beaumont, GCB, KCMG	1847	1922	Promoted Vice Admiral in 1902
16 September 1897	Charles William Beresford, 1st Baron Beresford, GCB, GCVO	1846	1919	Promoted Vice Admiral in 1902
16 September 1897	George Weightman Hand	1841	1914	on the Retired list since 1894
16 September 1897	Charles John Balfour	1841	1902	on the retired list since 1896
11 December 1897	Albert Baldwin Jenkings	1846	1942	Promoted Vice Admiral in 1903
26 December 1897	Sir Henry Coey Kane, KCB	1843	1917	Retired list on 25 August 1899; Promoted Vice Admiral on the Retired list in 1903
26 December 1897	Mather Byles	1840	1917	on the Retired list since 1890;
19 March 1898	Frederick Ross Boardman, CB	1843	1927	Retired list on 1 August 1899; Promoted Vice Admiral on the Retired list in 1903
31 March 1898	Sir James Andrew Thomas Bruce, KCMG	1846	1921	Promoted Vice Admiral in 1903
29 November 1898	Henry Rose	1844	1928	Promoted Vice Admiral in 1903
21 December 1898	Pelham Aldrich, CVO	1844	1930	Promoted Vice Admiral in 1903
1 January 1899	Swinton Colthurst Holland	1844	1922	Promoted Vice Admiral in 1903
1 January 1899	Charles Johnstone	1843	1927	on the Retired list since before promotion; promoted Vice Admiral on the Retired list in 1903.
1 January 1899	John Coke Burnell	1842	1928	on the Retired list since 1897; promoted Vice Admiral on the Retired list in 1903.
13 January 1899	Ernest Neville Rolfe, CB	1847	1909	Promoted Vice Admiral in 1903.
13 January 1899	Sir Arthur William Moore, GCB, GCVO, CMG	1847	1934	Promoted Vice Admiral in 1903
30 June 1899	Sir William Alison Dyke Acland, Bt, CVO	1847	1924	Promoted Vice Admiral in 1904
6 July 1899	William Frederick Stanley Mann	1846	1924	Retired list on 23 July 1901; promoted Vice Admiral on the Retired list in 1904
11 July 1899	John Hugh Bainbridge	1845	1901	
13 July 1899	Sir Charles Carter Drury, GCB, GCVO, KCSI	1846	1914	Promoted Vice Admiral in 1904
13 July 1899	Sacheverel Charles Darwin	1844	1900	on the retired list since 1892
26 October 1899	John Robert Ebenezer Pattisson	1844	1928	Promoted Vice-Admiral in 1904
20 November 1899	Sir William Hannam Henderson, KBE	1845	1931	Promoted Vice-Admiral in 1904
29 January 1900	Charles Vesey			on the Retired list since before promotion
29 January 1900	Henry Phelps			on the Retired list since before promotion
29 January 1900	James Edward Bickford	1828		on the Retired list since 1876
29 January 1900	Arthur Morrell			on the Retired list since before promotion
29 January 1900	James Henry Bushnell			on the Retired list since before promotion
29 January 1900	George Palmer			on the Retired list since before promotion
29 January 1900	Edward Bond Harrison Franklin			on the Retired list since before promotion
29 January 1900	Thomas Peere Williams Nesham	1843	1900	on the Retired list since 1892
3 March 1900	Sir Harry Tremenheere Grenfell, KCB, CMG	1845	1906	Promoted Vice Admiral in 1905
21 March 1900	Sir Baldwin Wake Walker, Bt, CMG, CVO	1846	1905	Promoted Vice Admiral in 1905
1 January 1901	King George V	1865	1936	as Duke of York; Promoted Vice Admiral in 1903.
1 January 1901	Sir Wilmot Hawksworth Fawkes, GCB, KCVO	1846	1926	Promoted Vice Admiral in 1905.
19 February 1901	Sir George Lambert Atkinson-Willes, KCB	1847	1921	Promoted Vice Admiral in 1905.
13 March 1901	Edward Henry Meggs Davis, CMG, OBE	1846	1929	Promoted Vice Admiral in 1905.
13 March 1901	Sir Sydney Marow Eardley-Wilmot	1847	1929	on the Retired list since 1893.
13 March 1901	Hon. Algernon Charles Littleton	1843	1912	on the Retired list since before promotion
13 March 1901	William Collins	1843	1917	on the Retired list since before 1886.
17 March 1901	John Harvey Rainier	1847	1915	Promoted Vice Admiral in 1905.
28 March 1901	Sir William Henry May, GCB, GCVO	1849	1930	Promoted Vice Admiral in 1905.
24 May 1901	Alfred Arthur Chase Parr	1849	1914	Promoted Vice Admiral in 1905.
15 June 1901	Sir Reginald Friend Hannam Henderson, GCB	1846	1932	Promoted Vice Admiral in 1905.
15 June 1901	George William Hill	1843	1905	on the Retired list since 1897; promoted Vice Admiral on the Retired list in 1905.
15 June 1901	Orford Churchill	1842	1909	on the Retired list since 1897; promoted Vice Admiral on the Retired list in 1905.
15 June 1901	Harry Francis Hughes-Hallett, CVO	1844	1913	on the Retired list since 1899; promoted Vice Admiral on the Retired list in 1905.
16 June 1901	Count Frederick Cosmeto Metaxa	1847	1910	Promoted Vice Admiral in 1905.
16 June 1901	John Salwey Hallifax	1846	1904	on the Retired list since 1899.
23 July 1901	Sir Assheton Gore Curzon-Howe, GCVO, KCB, CMG	1850	1911	Promoted Vice Admiral in 1905.
9 September 1901	Sir Edmund Samuel Poë, GCVO, KCB	1849	1921	Promoted Vice Admiral in 1906.
2 November 1901	Arthur Charles Burgoyne Bromley	1847	1909	Promoted Vice Admiral in 1906.
7 December 1901	Sir Charles Campbell, KCMG, CB, DSO	1847	1911	Promoted Vice Admiral in 1906.
1 January 1902	Sir John Durnford, GCB, DSO	1849	1914	Promoted Vice Admiral in 1906.
24 January 1902	William Marrack	1847	1926	Promoted Vice Admiral in 1906.
24 January 1902	Charles Edward Gissing	1845	1916	on the Retired list since 1897.
24 January 1902	Eustace Rooke	1844	1922	on the Retired list since 1899; promoted Vice Admiral on the Retired list in 1906.
25 January 1902	Sir Edward Chichester, Bt, CB, CMG	1849	1906	
1 July 1902	Gerald Charles Langley	1848	1914	Promoted Vice Admiral in 1906.
9 September 1902	Charles James Barlow, DSO	1848	1921	Promoted Vice Admiral in 1906.
22 September 1902	Henry John May, CB	1853	1904	
3 October 1902	Sir Hedworth Meux, GCB, KCVO	1856	1929	Promoted Vice Admiral in 1907.
3 October 1902	Charles James Norcock	1847	1933	on the Retired list since September 1902.
1 January 1903	Sir Francis Powell, KCMG, CB	1849	1927	Promoted Vice Admiral in 1907.
21 January 1903	William Des Vœux Hamilton	1852	1907	Promoted Vice Admiral in 1907.
30 May 1903	William Carnegie Codrington Forsyth	1849	1906	Retired list on 11 May 1904
30 May 1903	Anson Schomberg	1846	1925	on the Retired list since 1901.
12 August 1903	Sir Francis Charles Bridgeman Bridgeman, GCB, GCVO	1848	1929	Promoted Vice Admiral in 1907.
30 August 1903	Sir Richard Poore, 4th Baronet, KCB, CVO	1853	1930	Promoted Vice Admiral in 1907.
1 October 1903	George Augustus Giffard, CMG	1849	1925	Promoted Vice Admiral in 1907
1 October 1903	John Edric Blaxland	1847	1935	on the Retired list since 1902; promoted Vice Admiral on the Retired list in 1907
1 October 1903	Julian Alleyne Baker	1848	1922	on the Retired list since 1898.
1 January 1904	Charles Ramsay Arbuthnot	1850	1913	Retired list on 1 July 1907; Promoted Vice Admiral on Retired list in 1908
25 April 1904	Sir Archibald Berkeley Milne, 2nd Baronet, GCVO, KCB	1855	1938	Promoted Vice Admiral in 1908.
11 May 1904	Sir George Fowler King-Hall, KCB, CVO	1850	1939	Promoted Vice Admiral in 1908.
18 September 1906	Frederick Owen Pike, CMG, DSO	1851	1921	on the Retired list since February 1906; promoted Vice Admiral on the Retired list in 1911.
18 October 1906	Sir Henry Bradwardine Jackson, GCB, KCVO	1855	1929	Promoted Vice Admiral in 1911.
23 November 1906	William Blake Fisher, CB	1853	1926	
23 November 1906	Francis Raymond Pelly	1850	1907	on the retired list from 1905
1 July 1907	Alban Giffard Tate	1853	1930	Promoted Vice Admiral in 1912
1 July 1907	Thomas Young Greet	1854	1947	Retired list on 1 August 1908; Promoted Vice Admiral on Retired list in 1912
1 July 1907	Erasmus Denison St. Andrew Ommanney	1852	1936	on the Retired list since 1903
1 July 1907	George Edward Richards	1852	1927	on the Retired list since 1902
10 October 1907	Frederick Sidney Pelham			
16 December 1907	Arthur Archibald Campbell Galloway			
01 March 1908	Sir Alexander Edward Bethell, GCMG, KCB	1855	1932	Promoted Vice Admiral
22 March 1908	Sir Frederick Edward Errington Brock, GBE, KCMG, CB	1854	1929	Promoted Vice Admiral
11 April 1908	Hugh Pigot Williams	1858	1934	Promoted Vice Admiral in 1913.
1 August 1908	Sir Colin Richard Keppel, GCVO, KCIE, CB, DSO	1862	1947	Promoted Vice Admiral in 1913
18 September 1911	William Oswald Story, CBE	1859	1938	Placed on Retired List (at his request) 30 January 1912; promoted Vice Admiral on the Retired List in 1917. Promoted Admiral (Retired List) 3 October 1919.
1912	Sir Robert Arbuthnot, Bt, KCB, MVO	1864	1916	
9 June 1916	Sir Thomas Jackson, KBE, CB, MVO	1868	1945	Promoted Vice Admiral in 1920.
9 June 1916	Frank Edward Cavendish Ryan, CBE	1865	1945	Retired List on the following day 10 June 1916; promoted Vice Admiral on the Retired list in 1920.
9 June 1916	Philip Nelson-Ward, MVO	1866	1937	Retired List on the following day 10 June 1916; promoted Vice Admiral on the Retired list in 1920.
10 June 1916	Sir William Edmund Goodenough, GCB, MVO	1867	1945	Promoted Vice Admiral in 1920.
10 June 1916	Sir Michael Culme-Seymour, 4th Baronet, KCB, MVO	1867	1925	Promoted Vice Admiral in 1920.
10 June 1916	Sir William Coldingham Masters Nicholson, KCB	1863	1932	Promoted Vice Admiral in 1920.
30 June 1916	Ralph Hudleston	1864	1944	on the Retired list since 1912.
3 April 1917	Sir Francis Fitzgerald Haworth-Booth KCMG	1864	1935	Promoted Rear Admiral (Retired List) in 1917
23 October 1917	Edmond Hyde Parker, CB	1868	1951	Promoted Vice Admiral in 1923
23 October 1917	Edward Cecil Villiers, CMG	1866	1939	Retired list on the same day 23 October 1917
October 1918	Sir Guy Reginald Archer Gaunt, KCMG, CB	1869	1953	on the Retired list; promoted Vice Admiral on the Retired list in 1924.
24 March 1920	Alfred Charles Sykes, CMG	1868	1933	Retired List on the following day 25 March 1920; promoted Vice Admiral on the Retired list in 1925.
25 March 1920	John Luce, CB	1870	1932	Promoted Vice Admiral in 1925.
25 March 1920	Raymond Andrew Nugent, CMG	1870	1959	Retired List on the following day 26 March 1920; promoted Vice Admiral on the Retired list in 1925.
26 March 1920	Eustace la Trobe Leatham, CB	1870	1935	Retired List on 1 July 1921; promoted Vice Admiral on the Retired list in 1925.
26 March 1920	Sir George Henry Baird, KCB	1871	1924	
2 May 1921	Judge d′Arcy	1867	1927	Retired list 3 May 1921; promoted Vice Admiral on the Retired list in 1926.
3 May 1921	Francis Gerald St John, CB, MVO, ADC	1869		
	Sir Charles James Colebrooke Little, GCB, GBE	1882	1973	Promoted Vice Admiral in 1933
28 February 1929	Hon. Arthur Charles Strutt, CBE	1878	1973	Retired list in 1929; promoted Vice Admiral on the Retired list in 1933.
1 March 1929	Sir William Milbourne James, GCB	1881	1973	Promoted Vice Admiral in 1933
1 September 1933	Richard Anthony Aston Plowden, DSO	1881	1941	Retired list on the following day, 2 September 1933
2 September 1933	Sir St Aubyn Balwin Wake, KBE, CB	1882	1951	Promoted Vice Admiral in 1937
30 September 1933	Fischer Burges Watson, CBE, DSO	1884	1960	Retired list on 17 September 1935.
30 September 1933	Sir Charles Edward Kennedy-Purvis, GBE, KCB	1884	1946	Promoted Vice Admiral in 1937
11 December 1936	Sir Geoffrey Schomberg Arbuthnot, KCB, DSO	1885	1957	Promoted Vice Admiral in 1940
10 January 1939	Charles Otway Alexander	1888	1970	Promoted Vice Admiral in 1939
1941	Sir Geoffrey John Audley Miles, KCB, KCSI	1890	1986	Promoted Vice Admiral
15 January 1941	Sir Louis Henry Keppel Hamilton, KCB, DSO	1890	1957	Promoted Vice Admiral in 1943
15 January 1941	Sir Irvine Gordon Glennie, KCB	1892	1980	Promoted Vice Admiral in 1943
8 July 1941	Sir Frederick Hew George Dalrymple-Hamilton, KCB	1890	1974	Promoted Vice Admiral in 1944
8 July 1941	Sir Arthur Francis Eric Palliser, KCB, DSC	1890	1956	Promoted Vice Admiral in 1944
8 July 1941	Sir Denis William Boyd, KCB, CBE, DSC	1891	1965	Promoted Vice Admiral in 1944
6 February 1942	Sir Charles Eric Morgan, KCB, DSO	1889	1951	Promoted Vice Admiral
28 July 1942	Sir Douglas Blake Fisher, KCB, KBE	1890	1963	Promoted Vice Admiral in 1945
28 July 1942	Sir Cecil Halliday Jepson Harcourt, GBE, KCB	1892	1959	Promoted Vice Admiral in 1946
8 July 1943	James William Rivett-Carnac, CB, CBE, DSC	1891	1970	Retired list on 25 November 1946; promoted Vice Admiral on the Retired list in 1947
8 July 1943	John William Ashley Waller, CB	1892		Promoted Vice Admiral in 1947
8 July 1943	Sir Reginald Henry Portal, KCB, DSC	1894	1983	Promoted Vice Admiral in 1947
8 July 1943	Sir Ernest Russell Archer, KCB, CBE	1891	1958	Promoted Vice Admiral in 1947
8 July 1943	Sir John Anthony Vere Morse, KBE, CB, DSO	1892		Retired list on 14 July 1947; promoted Vice Admiral on the Retired list in 1947
8 July 1943	Sir Harold Richard George Kinahan, KBE, CB	1893	1980	Promoted Vice Admiral
8 July 1943	Arthur George Talbot, CB, DSO	1892	1960	Promoted Vice Admiral in 1948
8 July 1943	Sir Randolph Stewart Gresham Nicholson, KBE, CB, DSO, DSC	1892	1975	Promoted Vice Admiral in 1948
8 July 1943	Sir George Elvey Creasy, GCB, CBE, DSO, MVO	1895	1972	Promoted Vice Admiral in 1948
1 January 1944	Sir Charles Henry Lawrence Woodhouse, KCB	1893	1978	Promoted Vice Admiral in 1948
8 January 1944	Sir William Edward Parry, KCB	1893	1972	Promoted Vice Admiral in 1948
8 January 1944	Henry Jack Egerton, CB	1892	1972	Promoted Vice Admiral in 1948
8 January 1944	John George Lawrence Dundas	1893	1952	Retired list on 13 June 1946; promoted Vice Admiral on the Retired list in 1948
8 January 1944	Richard Shelley, CB, CBE	1892	1968	Promoted Vice Admiral in 1948
	Charles Hepworth Nicholson, CB			Retired list on 15 January 1948
	Brian Leonard Geoffrey Sebastian, CB			Retired list on 29 January 1948;
7 July 1944	Sir Edward Desmond Bewley McCarthy, KCB, DSO	1893	1966	Promoted Vice Admiral in 1948
2 January 1945	Gervase Boswell Middleton, CB, CBE	1893	1961	Promoted Vice Admiral in 1948
2 January 1945	Robert Don Oliver, CB, CBE, DSC	1895	1980	Promoted Vice Admiral in 1948
5 July 1945	Sir Arthur Robin Moore Bridge, KBE, CB	1894	1971	Promoted Vice Admiral in 1948
5 July 1945	Edmund Gerard Noel Rushbrooke, CBE, DSC	1892	1972	Retired list on 2 February 1947; Promoted Vice Admiral on the Retired list in 1948
2 October 1945	G. H. H. Brown			
2 October 1945	C. P. Berthon			
	Lionel Morgan Hobbs	1879	1967	Engineer Rear-Admiral
	Sir Kenneth Alexander Ingleby-MacKenzie, KBE, CB			Surgeon Rear Admiral; Promoted Surgeon Vice Admiral
	Richard James Rodney Scott		1967	
	Roger Ernest Worthington		1967	
1946?	Louis Mountbatten, 1st Earl Mountbatten of Burma, KG, GCB, OM, GCSI, GCIE, GCVO, DSO	1900	1979	Promoted Vice Admiral in 1949
2 January 1946	Gerald Maxwell Bradshaw Langley, CB, OBE	1895		Promoted Vice Admiral in 1949
5 July 1946	Patrick William Beresford Brooking, CB, DSO	1896		Promoted Vice Admiral in 1949
5 July 1946	Sir Maurice James Mansergh, KCB, CBE	1896	1966	Promoted Vice Admiral in 1949
5 July 1946	Sir Henry William Urquhart McCall, KCVO, KBE, CB, DSO	1895	1980	Promoted Vice Admiral in 1950
8 January 1947	Sir Philip King Enright, KBE, CB	1894	1960	Promoted Vice Admiral in 1950
8 January 1947	Douglas Young-Jamieson, CB	1893	1955	Promoted Vice Admiral in 1950
15 January 1947	Clifford Caslon, CB, CBE	1896		Promoted Vice Admiral in 1950
8 January 1947	Sir William Rudolph Slayter, KCB, DSO, DSC	1896	1971	Promoted Vice Admiral in 1950
8 January 1947	Sir Geoffrey Alan Brooke Hawkins, KBE, CB, MVO, DSC	1895	1980	Promoted Vice Admiral in 1950
8 January 1947	Sir William Gladstone Agnew, KCVO, CB, DSO	1898	1960	Retired list in 1950; Promoted Vice Admiral on the Retired list in 1950
8 January 1947	Harold Bruce Farncomb, CB, DSO, MVO	1899	1971	Retired in 1951
8 January 1947	Sir John Augustine Collins, KBE, CB	1899	1989	Promoted Vice Admiral
8 July 1947	Sir Charles Edward Lambe, GCB, CVO	1900	1960	Promoted Vice Admiral in 1950
8 July 1947	Lachlan Donald Mackintosh of Mackintosh, CB, DSO, DSC	1896	1957	Promoted Vice Admiral in 1950
8 July 1947	Brian Betham Schofield, CB, CBE	1895		Promoted Vice Admiral in 1950
8 July 1947	Sir Horace Geoffrey Norman, KCVO, CB, CBE	1896		Promoted Vice Admiral in 1950
8 July 1947	Basil Charles Barrington Brooke, CB, CBE	1895	1983	Retired list in on 11 October 1949; promoted Vice Admiral on the Retired list in 1950
	J. T. S. Hall, CIE			Retired List on; re-appointed Rear Admiral on Emergency List 30 March 1953.
	Sir Alan Kenneth Scott-Moncrieff, KCB, CBE	1900	1980	Promoted Vice Admiral
8 January 1948	Sir William Gerrard Andrewes, KBE, CB, DSO	1899	1974	Promoted Vice Admiral in 1950
8 January 1948	Sir William York La Roche Beverley, KBE, CB	1895	1982	Promoted Vice Admiral in 1950
8 January 1948	Sir Peveril Barton Reibey Wallop William-Powlett, KCB, KCMG, CBE, DSO	1898	1985	Promoted Vice Admiral in 1950
8 January 1948	Sir Cecil Aubrey Lawson Mansergh, KBE, CB, DSC	1898	1990	Promoted Vice Admiral in 1951
8 January 1948	Sir Charles Philip Clarke, KBE, CB, DSO	1898	1966	Retired list on 1 May 1951
8 January 1948	Eric William Longley Longley-Cook, CB, CBE, DSO	1898	1983	Promoted Vice Admiral
10 July 1948	Sir Albert Lawrence Poland, KBE, CB, DSO, DSC	1895	1967	Promoted Vice Admiral in 1951.
10 July 1948	Sir Charles Thomas Mark Pizey, GBE, CB, DSO	1899	1993	Promoted Vice Admiral in 1951.
1948	Aubrey John Wheeler, CB	1894	1970	Retired 1950
8 January 1949	Stuart Latham Bateson, CB, CBE	1898		Retired list on 23 December 1951.
8 July 1949	Sir Edward Michael Conolly Abel Smith, GCVO, CB	1899	1985	Promoted Vice Admiral in 1952.
	Albert Edward Malone		1970	Surgeon Rear Admiral
	H. P. Chapman, CBE			Retired List on 31 March 1952.
	Herbert Richard Barnes Hull		1970	Surgeon Rear Admiral
	Sir Archibald Day, KBE, CB, DSO	1899	1970	Promoted Vice Admiral in 1953.
	George Campbell Ross, CB, CBE	1900	1993	Retired list on 5 October 1953
	Sydney Brown, CB			Retired list on 5 October 1953.
	Francis Edward Clemitson, CB			Retired list on 12 October 1953.
	Sir Frank Trowbridge Mason, KCB		1988	Promoted Vice Admiral
	Sir Frederick Robertson Parham, GBE, KCB, DSO	1901	1991	Promoted Vice Admiral in 1952.
	Sir Ian Murray Robertson Campbell, KBE, CB, DSO	1898	1980	Promoted Vice Admiral in 1953.
	R. A. Braine, CB			Retired list on 6 August 1957.
	Sir Charles Fred Wivell Norris, KBE, CB, DSO	1900	1989	Promoted Vice Admiral
	Sir John Felgate Stevens, KBE, CB	1900	1989	Promoted Vice Admiral
8 January 1951	Sir Caspar John, GCB	1903	1984	Promoted Vice Admiral in 1954
8 January 1951	Sir Eric George Anderson Clifford, KCB, CBE	1900	1964	Promoted Vice Admiral in 1954
8 January 1951	Cecil Ramsden Longworthy Parry, CB, DSO	1901		Retired list on 15 September 1953
8 January 1951	Sir Anthony Wass Buzzard, Bt, CB, DSO, OBE	1902	1972	Retired list in 1954
8 January 1951	Sir William Geoffrey Arthur Robson, KBE, CB, DSO, DSC	1902	1989	Promoted Vice Admiral
8 January 1951	Sir John Peter Lorne Reid, GCB, CVO	1903	1973	Promoted Vice Admiral
8 January 1951	Sir John Wilson Cuthbert, KBE, CB	1902	1987	Promoted Vice Admiral in 1954
7 July 1951	Sir Arthur Gordon Voules Hubback, KBE, CB	1902	1970	Promoted Vice Admiral in 1954
7 July 1951	Arthur David Torlesse, CB, DSO	1902	1995	Retired list on 16 December 1954
7 July 1951	Sir John William Musgrave Eaton, KBE, CB, DSO, DSC	1902	1981	Promoted Vice Admiral in 1954
	George Walter Gillow Simpson, CB, CBE	1901	1972	Retired list on 30 March 1954.
	Robert Cobb, CBE			Retired list on 12 April 1954.
	F. R. P. Williams, CBE			Surgeon Rear Admiral; Retired list on 1 October 1954.
	John Sigdals		1967	
	James Breaks, CBE		1968	
	Ralph Lindsay Fisher, CB, DSO, OBE		1988	Retired List on 15 January 1957.
	F. A. Ballance, CB, DSO			Retired List on 21 November 1956.
	Sir Maxwell Richmond, KBE, CB, DSO	1900	1986	Promoted Vice Admiral in 1954
	Leslie Newton Brownfield, CB, CBE	1901	1968	Promoted Vice Admiral
	Sir Gerald Vaughan Gladstone, GBE, KCB	1901	1978	Promoted Vice Admiral in 1955.
	Charles Littlewood, CB, OBE			Retired List on 28 February 1955.
	Sir Alexander Davidson McGlashan, KBE, CB, DSO			Retired List on 7 March 1955.
	Sir Richard George Onslow, KCB, DSO	1904	1975	Promoted Vice Admiral in 1955.
	S. G. Rainsford, CB			Surgeon Rear Admiral; Retired List on 30 November 1955.
	Iain Gilleasbuig Maclean, CB, OBE			
	Robert Walsh Mussen, CB, CBE			Surgeon Rear Admiral; Retired List on 31 March 1955.
	Robert Spencer Warne, CB, CBE			Retired List on 15 april 1955.
	Alan Watson Laybourne, CB, CBE	1898	1977	Retired List on 23 May 1955.
	William Leslie Graham Adams, CB, OBE			Retired List on 15 March 1955.
	John Garnett Cranston Given, CB, CBE			Retired List on 28 June 1955.
	Sir Peter Grenville Lyon Cazalet, KBE, CB, DSO, DSC	1899	1982	Promoted Vice Admiral
	Humphrey Benson Jacombs, CBE		1969	on the Retired list since before promotion
8 January 1952	Sir Stephen Hope Carlill, KBE, CB, DSO	1902	1996	Promoted Vice Admiral in 1954
8 January 1952	Jocelyn Stuart Cambridge Salter, CB, DSO, OBE	1901	1989	Promoted Vice Admiral in 1954
8 July 1953	Peter Skelton, CB	1901		Retired list on 1 October 1956.
28 September 1953	John Eernest Cooke, CB			Engineer Rear-Admiral
28 September 1953	John Dudley Nelson Ham, CB			
28 September 1953	Philip Cardwell Taylor, CB			Retired list on 19 November 1956.
	George Barney Hamley Fawkes, CB, CVO, CBE	1903	1967	Retired list on 29 February 1956.
	Malcolm Walter St. Leger Searle, CB, CBE			Retired list on 29 February 1956.
	William Halford Selby, CB, DSC			Retired list on 29 February 1956.
	Guy Willoughby, CB			Retired list on 20 March 1956.
	Christopher Theodore Jellicoe, CB, DSO, DSC	1903		Retired list on 7 August 1956.
	Sir Hilary Worthington Biggs, KBE, CB, DSO	1905	1976	Promoted Vice Admiral in 1956
	Sir Robin Leonard Francis Durnford-Slater, KCB	1902	1984	Promoted Vice Admiral in 1956
	Sir Walter Thomas Couchman, KCB, CVO, DSO, OBE	1905	1981	Promoted Vice Admiral in 1956.
	Ballin Illingworth Robertshaw, CB, CBE			Promoted Vice Admiral in 1956.
	Ernest Henry Shattock, CB, OBE			Retired List on 30 June 1956.
	Harry Philip Currey, CB, OBE			Retired List on 25 July 1956.
	Sir Robert Cyril May, KBE, CB			Surgeon Rear-Admiral; Promoted Vice Admiral
	Sir William Kaye Edden, KBE, CB	1905	1990	Promoted Vice Admiral in 1957
5 April 1954	N. E. Dalton, OBE			
July 1954	Sir John Gilchrist Thesiger Inglis, KBE, CB	1906	1972	Promoted Vice Admiral in 1958
27 September 1954	William Kenneth Weston, CB, OBE			Retired list on 31 January 1958.
1 October 1954	L. B. Osborne			Surgeon Rear Admiral
30 October 1954	Arnold Ashworth Pomfret, CB, OBE	1900	1984	Surgeon Rear Admiral; Retired list on 30 October 1957.
7 January 1955	Sir John David Luce, KCB	1906	1971	Promoted Vice Admiral in 1958
7 January 1955	Philip Whitworth Burnett, CB, DSO, DSC			Retired list on 7 January 1958.
7 January 1955	Sir Wilfrid John Wentworth Woods, GBE, KCB	1906	1975	Promoted Vice Admiral in 1958.
7 January 1955	George Verner Motley Dolphin, CB, DSO	1902	1979	Retired list on 30 October 1958.
7 January 1955	Sir Laurence George Durlacher, KCB, OBE, DSC	1904	1986	Promoted Vice Admiral in 1958
7 January 1955	George Kempthorne Collett, CB, DSC			
7 January 1955	Keith McNeil Campbell-Walter, CB	1904	1976	Retired list on 7 July 1958
21 February 1955	Lancelot Arthur Babington Peile, CB, DSO			
28 February 1955	Sir John Ralph Coote, Bt, CB, CBE, DSC	1905	1978	Retired list on 7 January 1958
	Sir Douglas Eric Holland-Martin, GCB, DSO, DSC	1906	1977	Promoted Vice Admiral in 1958
	Patrick Willet Brock, CB, DSO			Retired list on 7 January 1958
	Sir William Robert Sylvester Panckridge, KBE, CB			Surgeon Rear Admiral; Promoted Vice Admiral
	W. V. Beach, CB, OBE			Surgeon Rear Admiral; Retired List on 19 April 1963.
	Henry John Bedford Grylls, CB			Retired List on 7 January 1958.
15 May 1955	Harry Philpot Koelle, CB			
21 June 1955	John Bertram Newsom, CB			Retired List on 8 February 1958.
7 July 1955	John Edwin Home McBeath, CB, DSO, DSC	1905	1982	Retired list on 7 July 1958.
19 September 1955	John Paul Wellington Furse, CB, OBE, VMH	1904	1978	Retired List on 22 April 1959.
	Roy Stephenson Foster-Brown, CB			Retired list on 22 May 1959.
	John Lee-Barber, CB, DSO	1905	1995	Retired list on 25 May 1959.
7 January 1956	Sir Anthony Cecil Capel Miers, VC, KBE, CB, DSO	1906	1985	Retired list on 7 July 1959.
7 January 1956	George Arthur Thring, CB, DSO			Retired list on 7 July 1958.
7 January 1956	Sir Charles Leo Glandore Evans, KCB, CBE, DSO, DSC	1908	1981	Promoted Vice Admiral in 1959.
7 January 1956	Sir Peter Dawnay, KCVO, CB, DSC			Promoted Vice Admiral
7 January 1956	Roger Stanley Wellby, CB, DSO			Retired List on 1 July 1959.
7 January 1956	Sir Royston Hollis Wright, GBE, KCB, DSC	1908	1977	Promoted Vice Admiral
7 July 1956	Michael Southcote Townsend, CB, OBE, DSO, DSC			
7 July 1956	Arthur Seymour Bolt, CB, DSO, DSC			Retired list on 10 August 1960
7 July 1956	Peter Douglas Herbert Raymond Pelly, CB, DSO	1904	1980	Retired in 1960
7 July 1956	Thomas Vallack Briggs, CB, OBE	1906	1999	Retired list on 1 September 1958.
7 July 1956	Sir Nicholas Alfred Copeman, KBE, CB, DSC	1906	1969	Promoted Vice Admiral
7 July 1956	Sir William Godfrey Crawford, KBE, CB, DSC	1907	2003	Promoted Vice Admiral
7 July 1956	Sir John Strike Lancaster, KBE, CB	1903	1992	Promoted Vice Admiral in 1959
7 January 1957	Sir Varyl Cargill Begg, GCB, DSO, DSC	1908	1995	Promoted Vice Admiral in 1960
	Sir Christopher Bonham-Carter, GCVO, CB	1907	1975	Retired List on 10 June 1959.
	Sir John Michael Villiers, KCB, OBE	1907	1990	Promoted Vice Admiral
	I. G. Aylen, CB, OBE, DSC			Retired list on 30 October 1963.
	J. Mansel Reese, CB, OBE			Surgeon Rear Admiral; Retired list on 30 October 1963.
	Sir Reginald Thomas Sandars, KBE, CB			Promoted Vice Admiral
	Henry Cuthbert Norris Rolfe, CB			Retired list on 1 July 1960.
	Robert Francis Storrs, CB			Retired list on 1 July 1960.
	Sir Kenneth Buckley, KBE			Retired list on 25 August 1961.
7 January 1958	Sir Desmond Parry Dreyer, GCB, CBE, DSC	1910	2003	Promoted Vice Admiral
7 January 1958	Dennis Royle Farquharson Cambell, CB, DSC	1907	2000	Retired List 19 October 1960
7 January 1958	Sir Hector Charles Donald Maclean, KBE, CB, DSC	1908	2003	Promoted Vice Admiral in 1960
7 January 1958	Gilbert Carey de Jersey, CB			
7 January 1958	John Yelverton Thompson, CB			
23 June 1958	George Phillips, CB			Surgeon Rear Admiral
7 July 1958	Sir John Graham Hamilton, GBE, CB	1910	1994	Promoted Vice Admiral in 1961.
7 July 1958	Sir Peter William Gretton, KCB, DSO, OBE	1912	1992	Promoted Vice Admiral in 1961.
7 July 1958	Edmund Neville Vincent Currey, CB, DSO, DSC	1906	1998	
7 July 1958	Sir Norman Egbert Denning, KBE, CB	1904	1979	Promoted Vice Admiral in 1961.
7 July 1958	Ernest Mill, CB, OBE			Retired list on 18 July 1962.
7 July 1958	Sir Michael Le Fanu, GCB, DSC	1913	1970	Promoted Vice Admiral in 1961
7 July 1958	David Charles Cairns, 5th Earl Cairns, GCVO, CB	1909	1989	Retired in 1961
	John Dent, CB, OBE			Retired list on 15 October 1958.
	Sir Alexander Henry Charles Gordon-Lennox, KCVO, CB, DSO	1911	1987	Retired in 1962
	Richard Louis Gibbon Proctor, CB			Surgeon Rear Admiral; Retired list on 30 November 1958.
	Sir Derek Duncombe Steele-Perkins, KCB, KCVO	1908	1994	Surgeon Rear Admiral; promoted Surgeon Vice Admiral in 1963.
	Sir St John Reginald Joseph Tyrwhitt, Bt, KCB, DSO, DSC	1905	1961	Promoted Vice Admiral in 1958
	Sir Robert Alastair Ewing, KBE, CB, DSC	1909	1997	Promoted Vice Admiral in 1960
	Sir Nigel Stuart Henderson, GCB	1909	1993	Promoted Vice Admiral in 1960
	Kenneth St Barbe Collins, CB, OBE, DSC			Retired list on 8 June 1960
	Noel Edward Harwood Clarke, CB			Retired list on 8 July 1960
	Bryan Cecil Durant, CB, DSO, DSC			Retired list on 5 June 1963
	David William Maurice Boyle, 9th Earl of Glasgow, CB, DSC	1910	1984	Retired list on 8 July 1963
	Walter William Hector Ash, CB			Retired list on 7 August 1963
	Sir Isaac William Trant Beloe, KBE, CB, DSC	1909	1966	Promoted Vice Admiral in 1963
	Sir Arthur Ellison Fitzroy Talbot, KBE, CB, DSO	1909	1998	Promoted Vice Admiral
	Jack Percival Scatchard, CB, DSC	1910	2001	Promoted Vice Admiral in 1963.
	Christopher Haynes Hutchinson, CB, DSO, OBE			Retired list on 27 January 1962.
7 January 1959	Philip Frederick Powlett, CB, DSO, DSC			Retired list on 25 April 1962.
7 January 1959	John Grant, CB, DSO	1908	1996	Retired in 1960
7 July 1959	Richard Everley Washbourn, CB, DSO, OBE	1910	1988	Retired in 1962
7 July 1959	Sir Arthur Richard Hezlet, KBE, CB, DSO, DSC	1914	2007	Promoted Vice Admiral in 1962.
7 July 1959	Derick Heny Fellowes Hetherington, CB, DSC	1911	1992	Retired in 1961.
7 July 1959	Talbot Leadam Eddison, CB, DSC			Retired list on 7 August 1962.
7 July 1959	Sir Richard Michael Smeeton, KCB, MBE	1912	1992	Promoted Vice Admiral in 1962.
7 July 1959	Sir John Byng Frewen, GCB	1911	1975	Promoted Vice Admiral in 1962.
7 July 1959	Vernon St. Clair Lane Magniac, CB			Retired list on 10 March 1962.
7 July 1959	Charles Bernard Pratt, CB			Retired List on 17 January 1963.
7 July 1959	Wilfred Geoffrey Stuart Tighe, CB			
	George Ian Mackintosh Balfour, CB, DSC			Retired List on 15 January 1963.
	John Howson, CB, DSC			Retired list on 17 April 1964.
	Sir Horace Rochfort Law, GCB, OBE, DSC	1911	2005	Promoted Vice Admiral in 1965.
	Henry Charles Hogger, CB, DSC			Retired list on 29 December 1961
	Desmond John Hoare, CB	1910	1988	Retired list on 29 December 1961
	Sir Antony Bartholomew Cole, KBE, CB, DSC			Promoted Vice Admiral in 1963
	Sir Frank Roddam Twiss, KCB, KCVO, DSC	1910	1994	Promoted Vice Admiral in 1963.
	Philip David Gick, CB, OBE, DSC			Retired list on 25 August 1964.
	Erroll Norman Sinclair, CB, DSC			Retired List on 30 September 1964.
7 July 1960	Sir Ronald Vernon Brockman, KCB, CSI, CIE, CVO, CBE	1909	1999	Promoted Vice Admiral in 1963.
7 July 1960	Godfrey Benjamin Teale, CB, CBE			Retired list on 7 August 1963.
7 July 1960	William James Munn, CB, DSO, OBE			Retired list on 21 May 1963.
7 July 1960	Sir Edmund George Irving, KBE, CB	1910	1990	Retired in 1966
7 July 1960	Sir Joseph Charles Cameron Henley, KCVO, CB			Retired list on 14 April 1965.
19 September 1960	W. Holgate, OBE			Surgeon Rear Admiral
3 October 1960	Sir Charles Roy Darlington, KBE			Instructor Rear Admiral; Retired list on 4 October 1965.
1960	James Ross, CB, DSC	1908	1996	Retired list 1963
1961	Sir Raymond Shale Hawkins, KCB	1909	1987	Promoted Vice Admiral in 1964.
7 July 1961	Sir Hugh Stirling Mackenzie, KCB, DSO, DSC	1913	1996	Promoted Vice Admiral in 1964.
8 January 1962	Peter John Hill-Norton, Baron Hill-Norton, GCB	1915	2004	Promoted Vice Admiral in 1965
8 January 1962	Sir Hugh Colenso Martell, KBE, CB	1912	1998	Promoted Vice Admiral in 1965
8 January 1962	Morice Alexander McMullen, CB, OBE			
7 July 1962	Sir John Osler Chattock Hayes, KCB, OBE	1913	1998	Promoted Vice Admiral in 1965
7 July 1962	John Stanley Raven, CB			Retired list on 6 February 1965
7 July 1962	James Humphrey Walwyn, CB, OBE	1913	1986	Retired list on 31 March 1965.
7 July 1962	Robert Love Alexander, CB, DSO, DSC	1913	1993	Retired list on 3 June 1965
7 July 1962	John Earl Scotland, CB, DSC			Retired list on 22 April 1968.
7 July 1962	Raymond Haydn Tribe, CB, MBE			Retired list on 30 September 1965
	Sir Horace Collier Lyddon, KBE, CB	1912	1968	Promoted Vice Admiral in 1966.
	Frederick Dossor, CB, CBE			Retired list on 30 August 1965
	Sir Charles Piercy Mills, KCB, CBE, DSC	1914	2006	Promoted Vice Admiral
7 January 1963	Sir Ian Leslie Trower Hogg, KCB, DSC	1911	2003	Promoted Vice Admiral in 1966.
7 January 1963	Sir Morgan Charles Morgan-Giles, DSO, OBE, GM	1914	2013	Retired list on 20 February 1964.
7 January 1963	David Apthorp Williams, CB, DSC			Retired list on 6 March 1965.
1963	Sir Patrick Uniacke Bayly, KBE, CB, DSC	1914	1998	Promoted Vice Admiral in 1967
1 April 1963	John Morley Holford, CB, OBE	1909	1997	Surgeon Rear Admiral; Retired list on 1 April 1966
10 April 1963	M. H. Adams			Surgeon Rear Admiral;
	Wilfred John Parker, CB, OBE, DSC			Promoted Vice Admiral in 1967
8 July 1963	Sir Donald Cameron Ernest Forbes Gibson, KCB, DSC			Promoted Vice Admiral in 1967
8 July 1963	Hugh Gordon Henry Tracy, CB, DSC			Retired list on 3 March 1966
8 July 1963	Anthony Woodifield, CB, CBE, MVO			
8 July 1963	Francis Brian Price Brayne-Nicholls, CB, DSC			Retired list on 6 November 1965
8 July 1963	John Gervase Beresford Cooke, CB, DSC			Retired list on 1 January 1968.
8 July 1963	Joseph Leslie Blackham, CB	1912	2004	
8 July 1963	John Garth Watson, CB			
24 October 1963	Sir Eric Dick Caldwell, KBE, CB	1907	2000	Surgeon Rear-Admiral; Promoted Vice Admiral in 1966.
	Alfred Jerome Lucian Phillips, DSO			
	A. Davies, CB			Retired list on 22 February 1966.
	William Leonard Mountain, CB, OBE			Surgeon Rear-Admiral; Retired list on 29 February 1968.
	Peter Noel Buckley, CB, DSO		1988	Retired list on 5 January 1965.
	Morice Gordon Greig, CB, DSC			Retired list on 16 January 1965.
	Philip Stanley Turner, CB			Surgeon Rear-Admiral; Retired list on 20 November 1964
	Charles Peter Graham Walker, CB, DSC			Promoted Vice Admiral in 1965.
	Sir John Michael Dudgeon Gray, KBE, CB	1913	1998	Promoted Vice Admiral in 1965.
	Sidney Grattan-Cooper, CB, OBE			Retired list on 4 March 1966.
	Sir William Donough O'Brien, KCB, DSC	1916	2016	Promoted Vice Admiral in 1967.
	Sir Eric Blackburn Bradbury, KBE, CB	1911	2003	Surgeon Rear-Admiral; Promoted Vice Admiral in 1968.
1964	Sir Ian Lachlan Mackay McGeoch, KCB, DSO, DSC	1914	2007	Promoted Vice Admiral in 1967.
7 January 1964	Sir Hugh Richard Benest Janvrin, KCB, DSC	1915	1993	Promoted Vice Admiral in 1967.
7 January 1964	Arthur James Cawthra, CB			Retired list on 2 January 1967
7 July 1964	Sir Michael Patrick Pollock, GCB, LVO, DSC	1916	2006	Promoted Vice Admiral in 1967.
	Gordon Thomas Seccombe Gray, CB, DSC			Retired list on 10 February 1965.
	David Walter Kirke, CB			Retired list on 14 March 1968.
	Thomas William Best, CB			Retired list on 19 March 1967.
7 July 1964	Henry Hugh Hughes, CB			Retired list on 6 April 1968.
7 July 1964	Sir Arthur Francis Turner, KCB, DSC	1912	1991	Promoted Vice Admiral in 1968.
7 January 1965	John Kingdon Watkins, CB, OBE	1913	1970	Retired list on 20 September 1967.
7 January 1965	Thomas Heron Maxwell, CB, DSC			Retired list on 8 March 1967.
7 January 1965	Colin Duncan Madden, CB, CBE, LVO, DSC	1915	2000	Retired list on 15 March 1967.
7 January 1965	Sir Edward Beckwith Ashmore, GCB, DSC	1919	2016	Promoted Vice Admiral in 1968.
7 January 1965	Rupert Charles Purchas Wainwright, CB, DSC	1913	1991	Retired list on 30 September 1967.
7 January 1965	Geoffrey Harry Carew-Hunt, CB	1917	1979	Retired list on 22 April 1968.
7 January 1965	Sir Peter Maxwell Compston, KCB	1915	2000	Promoted Vice Admiral in 1968.
7 July 1965	Sir Andrew MacKenzie Lewis, KCB	1918	1993	Promoted Vice Admiral in 1968.
7 July 1965	Sir Patrick John Morgan, KCVO, CB, DSC	1917	1989	Retired list on 7 October 1970
7 July 1965	Philip Graham Sharp, CB, DSC	1913	1988	Retired list on 30 August 1967.
7 July 1965	Cyril Hubert Surtees Wise, CB, MBE	1913	1982	Retired list on 27 September 1967.
7 July 1965	Cuthbert Francis Kemp, CB	1913	1999	Retired list on 28 September 1967.
7 July 1965	Dennis Howard Mason, CB, CVO	1916	1996	Promoted Vice Admiral in 1968
7 July 1965	Edmund Nicholas Poland, CB, CBE	1917	2012	Retired list on 10 January 1968.
7 July 1965	Richard Collings Paige, CB	1911	1998	Retired list on 6 August 1968.
6 September 1965	Albert John Bellamy, CB, OBE	1915	2012	Instructor Rear-Admiral; Retired list on 3 February 1970
1966	Józef Czeslaw Bartosik, CB, DSC	1917	2008	Retired list on 28 August 1968
7 January 1966	John Harold Adams, CB, MVO	1918	2008	Retired on 12 February 1968.
7 January 1966	George Stephen Ritchie, CB, DSC	1914	2012	Retired list on 10 April 1971.
7 January 1966	Sir Anthony Templer Frederick Griffith Griffin, GCB	1920	1996	Promoted Vice Admiral in 1968.
7 January 1966	Sir Robert George Raper, KCB	1915	1990	Promoted Vice Admiral in 1968.
7 January 1966	Ottakar Harold Moimir St John Steiner, CB	1916	1998	Retired list on 12 October 1968.
7 January 1966	Peter Cecil Gibson, CB	1913	2005	Retired list on 21 March 1969.
7 July 1966	Sir Peter William Beckwith Ashmore, KCB, KCVO, DSC	1921	2002	Promoted Vice Admiral in 1969.
7 July 1966	George Clement Crowley, CB, DSC	1916	1999	Retired list on 18 November 1968.
1966	George Hammond Evans, CB	1917	1980	Retired list on 2 September 1969.
1966	William Allen Haynes, CB, OBE	1913	1985	Retired list on 6 April 1970.
1966	Stanley Miles, CB	1911	1987	Surgeon Rear Admiral; Retired list on 3 October 1969.
1966	Sir John Edward Ludgate Martin, KCB, DSC	1918	2011	Promoted Vice Admiral in 1970.
1966	Dudley Plunket Gurd, CB	1910	1987	Surgeon Rear Admiral; Retired list on 26 June 1969.
1966	William Terence Colborne Ridley, CB, OBE	1915	2001	Retired list on 3 April 1972.
1966	Kenneth Haydn Farnhill, CB, OBE	1913	1983	Retired list on 8 April 1969.
1967	Michael Donald Kyrle Pope, CB, MBE	1916	2008	Retired list on 2 April 1970.
1967	William Bryan Scott Milln, CB	1915	1979	Retired list on 11 October 1969.
	Basil Charles Godfrey Place, VC, CB, CVO, DSC	1921	1994	Retired list on 30 June 1970.
	Denis Bryan Harvey Wildish, CB	1914	2017	Promoted Vice Admiral in 1970.
7 January 1967	Sir Leslie Derek Empson, GBE, KCB	1918	1997	Promoted Vice Admiral in 1970
7 January 1967	John Bayley Holt, CB	1912	1995	Retired list on 6 April 1970.
7 January 1967	Sir Louis Edward Stewart Holland Le Bailly, KBE, CB	1915	2010	Promoted Vice Admiral in 1970
7 January 1967	Sir Michael Frampton Fell, KCB, DSO, DSC	1918	1976	Promoted Vice Admiral in 1970
7 January 1967	George Wilsmore Gay, CB, MBE, DSC	1913	2001	Retired list on 14 April 1969.
7 January 1967	Geoffrey Archer Henderson, CB	1913	1985	Retired list on 6 October 1970
7 July 1967	Frank Douglas Holford, CB, DSC	1916	1991	Retired list on 2 March 1970.
7 July 1967	David Arthur Dunbar-Nasmith, CB, DSC	1921	1997	Retired list on 23 August 1972.
7 July 1967	Sir John Charles Young Roxburg, KCB, CBE, DSO, DSC	1919	2004	Promoted Vice Admiral in 1970.
7 July 1967	Gambier John Byng Noel, CB	1914	1995	Retired list on 24 September 1969.
1967	Dudley Leslie Davenport, CB, OBE	1919	1990	Retired list on 25 September 1969.
1967	Philip Holden Crothers Illingworth, CB	1916	1987	Retired list on 5 April 1973.
7 January 1968	George Cunningham Leslie, CB, OBE	1920	1988	Retired list on 17 November 1970.
7 January 1968	Terence Thornton Lewin, Baron Lewin, KG, GCB, LVO, DSC	1920	1999	Promoted Vice Admiral in 1970
7 January 1968	Cedric Kenelm Roberts, CB, DSO	1918	2011	Retired list on 15 January 1971.
7 January 1968	Ian David McLaughlan, CB, DSC	1919	1996	Retired list on 15 August 1972.
7 January 1968	Desmond Noble Callaghan, CB	1915	2000	Retired list on 6 April 1971.
7 January 1968	John Douglas Trythall, CB, OBE	1914	1991	Retired list on 4 April 1972.
7 July 1968	Sir Ian Stewart McIntosh, KBE, CB, DSO, DSC	1919	2003	Promoted Vice Admiral in 1970.
7 July 1968	Sir John Rae McKaig, KCB, CBE	1922	1996	Promoted Vice Admiral in 1970.
7 July 1968	Sir George Francis Allan Trewby, KCB	1917	2001	Promoted Vice Admiral in 1971.
1968	Sir Arthur Mackenzie Power, KCB, MBE	1921	1984	Promoted Vice Admiral in 1971.
1968	William Ivon Norman Forrest, CB	1914	2002	Surgeon Rear Admiral; Retired list on 11 October 1971.
1968	Ian Wyndham Jamieson, CB, DSO	1920	2005	Retired list on 3 January 1972.
7 January 1969	Richard Douglas Roberts, CB	1916	1995	Retired list on 3 April 1972.
7 January 1969	Charles Courtney Anderson, CB	1916	2008	Retired list on 28 August 1971.
7 January 1969	Frederick Charles William Lawson, CB, DSC	1917	2010	Retired list on 3 January 1972.
7 January 1969	Sir Edward Gerard Napier Mansfield, KBE, CVO	1921	2006	Promoted Vice Admiral in 1972.
7 January 1969	John Anthony Rose Troup, KCB, DSC	1921	2008	Promoted Vice Admiral in 1972.
June 1969	Ian Jaffery Lees-Spalding, CB	1920	2001	Retired list on 5 April 1974.
30 June 1969	Nicol Sinclair Hepburn, CB, CBE	1913	2000	Surgeon Rear Admiral; Retired list on 25 August 1972
7 July 1969	Douglas Granger Parker, CB, DSO, DSC	1919	2000	Retired list on 13 September 1971.
7 July 1969	Nigel Hugh Malim, CB, LVO	1919	2006	Retired list on 7 October 1971.
7 July 1969	Sir Ian Easton, KCB, DSC	1917	1989	Promoted Vice Admiral in 1972.
7 July 1969	Arthur Rodney Barry Sturdee, CB, DSC	1919	2009	Retired list on 7 April 1972.
7 July 1969	Sir John Ernle Pope, KCB	1921	1998	Promoted Vice Admiral in 1972.
7 July 1969	Derrick George Kent, CB	1920	1983	Retired list on 7 October 1971.
7 July 1969	Arthur Francis Caswell, CBE			Retired list on 27 October 1971.
7 July 1969	Colin Charles Harrison Dunlop, CB, CBE	1918	2009	Retired list on 5 April 1974.
22 September 1969	Sir James Watt, KBE	1914	2009	Surgeon Rear Admiral; Promoted Surgeon Vice Admiral
3 October 1969	Rex Philip Phillips, CB, OBE	1913	1995	Surgeon Rear Admiral; Retired list on 31 October 1972.
1969	Edward Findlay Gueritz, CB, OBE, DSC	1919	2008	Retired list on 15 January 1973.
	Anthony O′Connor, LVO	1917	2004	Surgeon Rear Admiral; Retired list on 19 May 1975.
	John Hunter, CB, OBE			Surgeon Rear Admiral; Director of Naval Dental Services; Retired list on 12 October 1974
	Cyril Lawson Tait McClintock, CB, OBE			Surgeon Rear Admiral; Retired list on 26 August 1975.
6 January 1970	Brinley John Morgan, CB			Inspector Rear-Admiral; Retired list on 5 May 1975
7 January 1970	Charles William Haimes Shepherd, CB, CBE			Retired list on 28 November 1973.
7 January 1970	Sir Iwan Geoffrey Raikes, KCB, CBE, DSC	1921	2011	Promoted Vice Admiral in 1973
7 January 1970	James Percy Knowles Harkness, CB			
7 January 1970	John Edward Dyer-Smith, CBE			Retired list on 21 February 1972.
7 January 1970	John Alfred Templeton-Cotill, CB	1920	2011	Retired list on 7 October 1973.
7 January 1970	Sir Peter White, GBE	1919	2010	Promoted Vice Admiral in 1973.
7 July 1970	Sir John Deveraux Treacher, KCB	1924	2018	Promoted Vice Admiral in 1972
7 July 1970	Alan Christopher Wyndham Wilson, CB			Retired list on 7 April 1975.
7 July 1970	Philip Roger Canning Higham, CB			Retired list on 2 January 1973.
7 July 1970	Sir Richard John Trowbridge, KCVO	1920	2003	Retired list on 7 October 1975.
7 July 1970	Hilary Charles Nicholas Goodhart, CB	1919	2011	Retired list on 7 April 1973.
7 July 1970	Sir David Williams, GCB	1921	2012	Promoted Vice Admiral in 1973.
7 July 1970	Martin Noel Lucey, CB, DSC	1920	1992	Retired list on 18 October 1974
7 January 1971	Lionel Dorian Dymoke, CB			Retired list on 23 September 1976.
7 January 1971	Geoffrey Penrose Dickinson Hall, CB, DSC			Retired list on 15 November 1975.
7 January 1971	Peter George La Niece, CB, CBE			Retired list on 6 August 1973.
7 January 1971	Sir Philip Alexander Watson, KBE, LVO	1919	2009	Promoted Vice Admiral in 1974
7 January 1971	Sir Anthony Storrs Morton, GBE, KCB	1923	2006	Promoted Vice Admiral in 1975.
7 January 1971	Harry Desmond Nixon, CB, MVO			
7 July 1971	Sir William David Stuart Scott, KBE, CB	1921	2006	Retired list on 16 June 1980.
7 July 1971	Geoffrey Charles Mitchell, CB			Retired list on 21 October 1975.
7 July 1971	Sir Henry Conyers Leach, GCB	1923	2011	Promoted Vice Admiral in 1974
7 July 1971	Sir Peter Murray Austin, KCB			Promoted Vice Admiral
7 July 1971	Derek Garland Spickernell, CB			Retired list on 5 June 1975.
7 January 1972	Michael Harold Griffin, CB			Retired list on 30 July 1977.
7 January 1972	Jack Rowbottom Llewellyn, CB			Retired list on 5 April 1975.
7 January 1972	Edward William Ellis, CB, CBE	1918	2002	Retired list 1974
7 January 1972	Hubert Walter Elphinstone Hollins, CB			Retired list on 3 March 1977
7 January 1972	Thomas Rennison Cruddas, CB			Retired list on 31 March 1976.
7 January 1972	Sir James Henry Fuller Eberle, GCB	1927	2018	Promoted Vice Admiral in 1977
7 January 1972	Andrew John Miller	1926		Retired list on 8 September 1973.
7 July 1972	Sir James George Jungius, KBE	1923	2020	Promoted Vice Admiral in 1974
7 July 1972	Sir Allan Gordon Tait, KCB	1921	2005	Promoted Vice Admiral
7 July 1972	Ian George William Robertson, CB, DSC	1922	2012	Retired list on 7 October 1974
7 July 1972	Alan George Watson, CB			Retired list on 28 January 1977
7 July 1972	Sir Raymond Derek Lygo, KCB	1924	2012	Promoted Vice Admiral in 1975.
	Sir Peter Anson, Bt, CB	1924	2018	Retired list on 25 January 1975
	George Augustus Binns, CB			Surgeon Rear Admiral; Retired list on 25 October 1975.
	Derrick Henry Hall-Thompson			
	Douglas Murdo Becton, CB, OBE			Surgen Rear Admiral
7 January 1973	Sir Ronald Stephen Forrest, KCVO	1923	2005	Retired list on 20 June 1975.
7 January 1973	Brian Byrne Mungo, CB			Retired list on 31 March 1976.
7 January 1973	Arthur Brooke Webb, CB			Retired list on 5 April 1975.
7 January 1973	Stanley Lawrence McArdle, CB, MVO, GM	1922	2007	Retired list on 7 October 1975.
7 January 1973	James William Dunbar Cook, CB	1921	2007	Retired list on 5 April 1975.
7 July 1973	Derek Graham Satow, CB			Retired list on 2 April 1979.
7 July 1973	Herbert Gardner, CB			Retired list on 31 March 1977.
7 July 1973	Sir David Anning Loram, KCB, CVO	1924	2011	Promoted Vice Admiral in 1977.
7 July 1973	Sir Peter Egerton Capel Berger, KCB, LVO, DSC	1925	2003	Promoted Vice Admiral in 1976.
7 July 1973	Sir Richard Pilkington Clayton, GCB	1925	1984	Promoted Vice Admiral in 1975
7 July 1973	Sir Lancelot Richard Bell Davies, KBE			Promoted Vice Admiral in 1976.
7 January 1974	Frank Wright Hearn, CB			Retired list on 30 March 1977.
7 January 1974	Ronald Albert Harcus, CB			Retired list on 31 March 1976.
7 January 1974	Alfred Raymond Rawbone, CB, AFC			Retired list on 31 March 1976.
7 January 1974	William Noel Ash, CB, MVO			Retired list on 31 March 1977
7 January 1974	Sir Stephen Ferrier Berthon, KCB	1922	2007	Promoted Vice Admiral in 1977.
7 January 1974	Sir Arthur Desmond Cassidi, GCB	1925	2019	Promoted Vice Admiral in 1976.
7 July 1974	Anthony John Monk, CBE			Retired list on 30 June 1978.
7 July 1974	David Hepworth, CB			Retired list on 7 October 1976.
7 July 1974	Philip Reginald Marrack, CB			Retired list on 4 April 1981.
7 July 1974	Sir Roderick Douglas Macdonald, KBE	1921	2001	Promoted Vice Admiral in 1976
7 July 1974	Sefton Ronald Sandford, CB			Retired list on 8 December 1976.
7 July 1974	Derek Willoughby Bazalgette, CB	1924	2007	Retired list on 23 September 1976.
16 August 1974	Albert Edward Cadman, CB			Surgeon Rear Admiral; Director of Naval Dental Services; Retired list on 15 October 1977.
7 January 1975	Thomas Buckhurst Homan, CB			Retired list on 31 March 1978.
7 January 1975	Sir John Morrison Forbes, KCB	1925	2021	Promoted Vice Admiral in 1977.
7 January 1975	Gordon Walter Bridle, CB, MBE			Retired list on 31 March 1977.
7 January 1975	John Fieldhouse, Baron Fieldhouse, GCB, GBE	1928	1992	Promoted Vice Admiral in 1978.
7 January 1975	Kenneth Gordon Ager, CB			Retired list on 31 March 1977
7 January 1975	Cecil Robert Peter Charles Branson, CBE	1924	2011	Retired list on 31 March 1977
22 March 1975	Sir John Stuart Pepys Rawlins, KBE	1922	2011	Surgeon Rear Admiral; Promoted Vice Admiral in 1978.
30 June 1975	Patterson David Gordon Pugh, OBE			Surgeon Rear-Admiral; Retired list on 15 March 1978.
7 July 1975	John Roger Southey Gerard-Pearse, CB	1924	2017	Retired list on 2 April 1979.
7 July 1975	Sir Oswald Nigel Amherst Cecil, KBE, CB	1925	2017	Retired list on 15 September 1979.
7 July 1975	Sir Roy William Halliday, KBE, DSC	1923	2007	Promoted Vice Admiral in 1978.
7 July 1975	Sir David Wiliam Haslam, KBE, CB	1923	2009	Retired list on 30 March 1985
7 July 1975	Sir Hugh Pendrel Janion, KCVO			Retired list on 9 April 1981.
7 July 1975	Edward James William Flower, CB	1923	2002	Retired list on 14 June 1980.
7 July 1975	Michael Laurence Stacey, CB			Retired list on 25 March 1979.
30 August 1975	Harry Russell Mallows			Surgeon Rear Admiral; Retired list on 18 October 1977.
	Sir Cameron Rusby, KCB, LVO	1926	2013	Promoted Vice Admiral in 1977
	John Oliver Roberts, CB	1924	2025	Retired list on 31 March 1978.
	John Anthony Bell, CB			Retired list on 15 January 1979.
7 January 1976	Anthony John Cooke, CB	1927	2019	Retired list on 1 October 1980
7 January 1976	Benjamin Cubitt Perowne, CB			Retired list on 31 March 1978.
7 January 1976	Cecil Ernest Price, CB			Retired list on 2 April 1980.
7 January 1976	Sir John Stuart Crosbie Lea, KBE	1923	2015	Promoted Vice Admiral in 1978
7 January 1976	William James McClune, CB			Retired list on 7 October 1978.
7 January 1976	Sir William Thomas Pillar, GBE, KCB	1924	1999	Promoted Vice Admiral in 1979
7 January 1976	D. G. Titford			Retired list on 31 March 1978.
7 July 1976	Sir Thomas Henry Eustace Baird, KCB	1924		Promoted Vice Admiral in 1979.
7 July 1976	Christopher Martin Bevan, CB			Retired list on 6 October 1978.
7 July 1976	Charles Arthur Winfield Weston, CB	1928	1998	Retired list on 23 September 1978.
7 July 1976	Gwynedd Idriss Pritchard, CB	1924	2012	Retired list on 5 April 1981.
7 July 1976	Sir Peter William Buchanan, KBE	1925	2011	Promoted Vice Admiral in 1979.
7 January 1977	Bryan John Straker, CB, OBE			Retired list on 10 February 1981.
7 January 1977	Wilfred Jackson Graham, CB			Retired list on 4 April 1979.
7 January 1977	Sir William Doveton Minet Staveley, GCB	1928	1997	Promoted Vice Admiral in 1980
7 January 1977	A. A. Murphy, CBE			Retired list on 18 February 1983.
7 January 1977	Sir Lindsay Sutherland Bryson, KCB	1925	2005	Promoted Vice Admiral in 1979
7 January 1977	Martin La Touche Wemyss	1927	2022	Retired list on 4 April 1981.
30 March 1977	Sir John Albert Bews Harrison, KBE			Surgeon Rear Admiral; Promoted Vice Admiral in 1980.
7 July 1977	Thomas Henry Bradbury, CB			Retired list on 8 July 1979.
7 July 1977	Robert Risley Squires	1927	2016	Promoted Vice Admiral in 1980.
7 July 1977	Sir Edward John Horlick, KBE	1925	2021	Promoted Vice Admiral in 1979.
7 July 1977	Peter Beauchamp Hogg, CB			Retired list on 7 April 1980
23 August 1977	Francis Joseph O′Kelly, OBE			Surgeon Rear-Admiral; Retired list on 24 September 1980
16 September 1977	Brian Frederick Rogers, CB			Surgeon Rear Admiral; Retired list on 2 April 1980.
7 January 1978	Sir John Michael Holland Cox, KCB	1928	2006	Promoted Vice Admiral in 1981.
7 January 1978	John Richard Danford Nunn, CB			Retired list on 3 April 1980
7 January 1978	Robert Michael Burgoyne, CB			Retired list on 1 February 1983.
7 January 1978	Alexander Peter Comrie, CB			Retired list on 13 June 1983.
6 February 1978	Ian Harris Colley, OBE			Surgeon Rear Admiral; Retired list on 12 April 1980.
7 July 1978	Sir Simon Alastair Cassillis Cassels, KCB, CBE	1928	2019	Promoted Vice Admiral in 1980.
7 July 1978	Sir James Edward Campbell Kennon, KCB, CBE	1925	1991	Promoted Vice Admiral in 1981.
7 July 1978	Sir Peter Geoffrey Marshall Herbert, KCB, OBE	1929	2019	Promoted Vice Admiral in 1981.
7 July 1978	William Duncan Lang, CB			Retired list on 6 April 1981.
7 July 1978	Charles Bernard Williams, CB, OBE	1925	2015	Retired list on 8 August 1980.
7 July 1978	Derek O′Hara, CB			Retired list on 7 April 1983.
7 January 1979	Sir Peter Maxwell Stanford, GCB, LVO	1929	1991	Promoted Vice Admiral in 1982
7 January 1979	Sir David John Hallifax, KCB, KCVO, KBE	1927	1992	Promoted Vice Admiral in 1982.
7 January 1979	John Hood, CBE			Retired list on 3 April 1981.
7 January 1979	Sir Paul Woollven Greening, GCVO	1928	2008	Retired list on 8 November 1985.
7 January 1979	Alexander Fortune Rose Weir, CB			Retired list on 1 August 1981.
7 January 1979	Anthony John Whetstone, CB	1927	2022	Retired list on 20 May 1983.
7 January 1979	Sir Leslie William Townsend, KCVO, CBE	1924	1999	Retired list on 2 April 1982.
7 January 1979	William Angus Waddell, CB, OBE			Retired list on 7 April 1981.
7 January 1979	Paul Eric Bass, CB			Retired list on 4 April 1981.
7 July 1979	Sir Anthony Sanders Tippet, KCB	1928	2006	Promoted Vice Admiral in 1983.
7 July 1979	Robert Goodwin Baylis, CB, OBE			Retired List on 26 June 1984.
7 July 1979	Kenneth Henry George Willis, CB			Retired list on 11 November 1981.
7 July 1979	Sir John Frederick Cadell, KBE	1929	1998	Promoted Vice Admiral in 1982.
7 January 1980	Sir Edward Rosebery Anson, KCB			Promoted Vice Admiral in 1982.
7 January 1980	Sir Derek Roy Reffell, KCB	1928		Promoted Vice Admiral in 1983.
7 January 1980	John Scott Grove, CB, OBE			
7 January 1980	Sir David Worthington Brown, KCB	1927	2005	Promoted Vice Admiral in 1982.
7 January 1980	David Conrad Jenkin, CB			Flag Officer First Flotilla. Retired list on 4 April 1984.
7 January 1980	John Keith Robertson, CB			Retired list on 23 July 1983.
7 January 1980	John Bethell Hervey, CB, OBE			Retired list on 11 September 1982
4 February 1980	Roger John William Lambert		1984	Surgeon Rear Admiral; promoted Vice Admiral in 1983.
11 February 1980	Francis Michael Kinsman, CBE			Surgeon Rear Admiral; Retired list on 7 April 1982.
25 February 1980	Philip Reginal John Duly, CB, OBE			Surgeon Rear-Admiral; Retired list on 9 November 1983.
28 April 1980	J. Keeling, CBE			Surgeon Rear Admiral; Retired list on 13 July 1983.
7 July 1980	Peter Gerald Hammersley, CB, OBE	1928	2020	Retired list on 7 October 1982.
7 July 1980	John Hildred Carlill, OBE	1925	2015	Retired list on 28 December 1983
7 July 1980	George Maxted Kenneth Brewer, CB			Retired list on 4 September 1982
7 July 1980	David Michael Eckersley-Maslin, CB	1929	2017	Retired list on 12 July 1986.
28 July 1980	John Marsden Haughton, MVO, QHP			Surgeon Rear-Admiral; Retired list on 29 September 1982
7 January 1981	John Philip Edwards, CB, MVO	1927	2014	Retired List on 7 October 1983.
7 January 1981	Sir Nicholas John Streysham Hunt, GCB, LVO, DL	1930	2013	Promoted Vice Admiral in 1983
7 January 1981	Sir Richard George Alison Fitch, KCB	1929	1994	Promoted Vice Admiral in 1984.
7 January 1981	J. R. Hill			Retired list on 5 April 1983.
7 January 1981	Trevor Owen Keith Spraggs, CB			Retired list on 11 June 1983.
7 January 1981	David John Mackenzie, CB			Retired List on 29 April 1983.
7 January 1981	John William Townshend Walters, CB			Retired List on 5 October 1984.
7 July 1981	David Edward Macey, CB			Retired List on 17 August 1984.
7 July 1981	John Charles Warsop, CB			
7 July 1981	Anthony Sanderson George, CB			Retired list on 8 July 1983
7 July 1981	Sir John Forster Woodward, GBE, KCB	1932	2013	Promoted Vice Admiral in 1984.
7 July 1981	Sir Robert William Frank Gerken, KCB, CBE	1932	2022	Promoted Vice Admiral in 1984
7 January 1982	Kenneth Dilworth East Wilcockson, CBE			Retired list on 4 February 1984.
7 January 1982	J. E. K. Croydon			Retired list on 19 December 1984.
7 January 1982	Sir Geoffrey Thomas James Oliver Dalton, KCB	1931	2020	Promoted Vice Admiral in 1984.
3 February 1982	Ernest E. P. Barnard			Surgeon Rear-Admiral; Retired List on 14 July 1984.
5 April 1982	Sir John Morrison Webster, KCB	1932	2020	Promoted Vice Admiral in 1985.
1 June 1982	Sir Patrick Jeremy Symons, KBE			Promoted Vice Admiral in 1985.
3 August 1982	J. Cox, OBE			Surgeon Rear Admiral; Retired List on 3 October 1984.
6 August 1982	William Alleyne Higgins, CB, CBE			Retired list on 28 March 1986.
10 August 1982	A. A. Lockyer, MVO			Retired list on 12 December 1984.
2 September 1982	Sir John Julian Robertson Oswald, GCB	1933	2011	Promoted Vice Admiral in 1986
2 September 1982	Geoffrey Gordon Ward Marsh, CB, OBE			Retired List on 23 June 1990.
13 December 1982	G. A. Baxter			Retired list on 12 February 1985.
14 December 1982	F. Bowen			Retired list on 29 December 1984.
25 January 1983	Sir George Montague Francis Vallings, KCB	1932	2007	Promoted Vice Admiral 1985
9 February 1983	Michael Anthony Vallis, CB	1929	2003	Retired list on 24 October 1986.
11 April 1983	Sir William Richard Scott Thomas, KCB, KCVO, OBE	1932	1998	Promoted Vice Admiral in 1987
12 April 1983	Linley Eric Middleton, CB, DSO	1929	2012	Retired list on 6 March 1987.
12 April 1983	John Perronet Barker, CB			Retired list on 1 April 1986.
18 April 1983	Michael Frank Simpson, CB			Retired list on 29 October 1985.
19 April 1983	Sir John Jeremy Black, GBE, KCB, DSO	1932	2015	Promoted Vice Admiral in 1986.
23 August 1983	Euan Maclean, CB			Retired list on 11 June 1986.
7 September 1983	F. R. B. Mathias			Surgeon Rear Admiral; Retired list on 27 August 1985.
8 October 1983	Sir Hugh Leslie Owen Thompson, KBE			Promoted Vice Admiral in 1986.
10 October 1983	Sir David Benjamin Bathurst, GCB	1936	2025	Promoted Vice Admiral in 1986
9 January 1984	John Burgess, CB, LVO			Retired list on 6 July 1987.
16 April 1984	Richard George Heaslip, CB	1932		Retired list 15 July 1987
18 April 1984	Robin Ivor Trower Hogg, CB	1932		Retired list on 6 February 1988.
8 May 1984	Sir Michael Howard Livesay, KCB	1936	2003	Promoted Vice Admiral
15 May 1984	Sir Godfrey James Milton-Thompson, KBE	1930	2012	Surgeon Rear Admiral; promoted Vice Admiral in 1988.
3 July 1984	Kenneth Arthur Snow, CB	1934	2011	
7 August 1984	Trevor Richard Walker Hampton, CB			Surgeon Rear-Admiral;
18 September 1984	Timothy Michael Bevan, CB	1931	2019	Retired List on 16 May 1987.
18 September 1984	Sir John Beverley Kerr, GCB	1937	2019	Promoted Vice Admiral in 1988.
16 October 1984	Gilbert Archibald Ford Hitchens, CB			Retired List on 25 November 1987.
6 November 1984	Andrew John Richmond, CB			Retired list 29 August 1987
16 November 1984	Sir Norman Ross Dutton King, KBE	1933	2013	Promoted Vice Admiral in 1988.
17 December 1984	Ronald Victor Holley, CB			Retired List on 23 December 1987.
2 January 1985	John Brian Drinkwater	1931	2018	Surgeon Rear-Admiral; Retired List on 11 March 1987.
28 January 1985	Roger Oliver Morris, CB			Retired List on 21 April 1990.
5 February 1985	Roger Charles Dimmock, CB	1935	2014	
26 March 1985	Peter George Valentine Dingemans, CB, DSO			Retired List on 14 April 1990.
18 June 1985	Sir John Cunningham Kirkwood Slater, GCB, LVO	1938		Promoted Vice Admiral in 1987
2 September 1985	P. N. Marsden			Retired List on 25 June 1988.
12 September 1985	Sir John Garnier, KCVO, CBE	1934		Retired List on 14 November 1990.
30 September 1985	J. S. Cooper, OBE			Retired List on 14 May 1988.
8 October 1985	David Robert Sherval, CB			Retired list on 1 November 1989.
5 November 1985	Anthony Wheatley, CB			
	Sir Barry Nigel Wilson, KCB	1936	2018	Promoted Vice Admiral
28 January 1986	Sir Brian Thomas Brown, KCB, CBE	1934	2020	Promoted Vice Admiral in 1988
17 February 1986	J. P. B. O′Riordan, CBE			Retired list on 24 June 1989.
15 April 1986	Christopher Lainson Wood, CB			
7 August 1986	Christopher Hope Layman, CB, LVO, DSO			
28 August 1986	Robert Arthur Isaac, CB			Retired list on 21 October 1989.
16 September 1986	Sir Alan Grose, KBE	1937		Promoted Vice Admiral
10 November 1986	Anthony Mansfeldt Norman, CB			Retired list on 15 April 1989.
5 December 1986	M. C. Cole			Retired List on 15 September 1990.
6 January 1987	Guy Francis Liardet, CB, CBE			Retired List on 19 June 1990.
6 January 1987	Ronald Edward Snow, CB, LVO, OBE			Surgeon Rear-Admiral;
15 February 1987	Sir James Lamb Weatherall, KCVO, KBE	1936	2018	Promoted Vice Admiral
5 March 1987	Sir Neville Purvis, KCB	1936		Promoted Vice Admiral
2 April 1987	C. J. Howard			Retired list on 6 June 1989.
7 April 1987	H. M. White, CBE			
8 June 1987	Sir John Francis Coward, KCB, DSO	1937	2020	Promoted to Vice Admiral
10 September 1987	Hon. Sir Nicholas John Hill-Norton, KCB	1939		Promoted to Vice Admiral
20 October 1987	Sir Robert Charles Finch Hill, KBE			Promoted to Vice Admiral
27 October 1987	David Martin Pulvertaft, CB	1938		Retired
3 November 1987	Sir Kenneth John Eaton, GBE, KCB	1934	2022	Promoted Vice Admiral
	Peter Francis Grenier, CB	1934		Retired list on 22 November 1989.
1 January 1988	David Arthur Coppock, CB			Surgeon Rear Admiral; Retired List on 5 July 1990.
5 January 1988	E. S. J. Larken, DSO			Retired List on 17 October 1990.
7 March 1988	D. Allen, CBE			
7 March 1988	Sir David Stuart Dobson, KBE	1938		Promoted Vice Admiral
8 March 1988	Sir Anthony Peter Woodhead, KCB	1939		Promoted Vice Admiral
18 March 1988	J. M. T. Hilton			Retired list on 5 June 1990.
18 March 1988	I. H. Pirnie			Retired list on 6 February 1993.
16 May 1988	James Frederick Thomas George Salt, CB	1940	2009	Retired list on 28 June 1991.
6 June 1988	R. T. Newman			
19 July 1988	R. T. Frere			
4 August 1988	Sir Michael Henry Gordon Layard, KCB, CBE	1936		Promoted Vice Admiral
Nov 1989	John Patrick Middleton CB	1938		Retired list Nov 1992. Book “Admiral Clanky Entertains” published by Matador Press.
	Hugh Maxwell Balfour, CB, LVO	1933	1999	
	Colin Herbert Dickinson Cooke-Priest, CB			Retired list 17 May 1993
	John Geoffrey Robin Musson, CB			Retired list 26 June 1993.
	David Laskey Lammiman, LVO, QSO			Surgeon Rear-Admiral; Retired list 17 April 1993.
	F. St. C. Golden, OBE			Surgeon Rear-Admiral; Retired list 26 June 1993
1990?	David Kenneth Bawtree, CB	1937		Retired list 20 November 1993
1990?	Jeremy Thomas Sanders, CB, OBE	1942		
	Graham Noel Davis, CB			
	John Antony Lovell Myres, CB			Retired list on 16 April 1994
	Richard Francis Cobbold, CB			Retired list on 7 May 1994
	Anthony Paul Hoddinott, CB, OBE	1942		Retired list on 21 June 1994
	Timothy John England	1942		Retired list on 7 January 1995
	J. S. Lang			Retired list on 22 April 1995
1990?	Sir Robert Nathaniel Woodard, KCVO	1939		Retired list on 17 July 1995
	Richard Oran Irwin, CB	1942		
	Roger Charles Moylan-Jones	1940		Retired list on 26 April 1995
	John Robert Shiffner, CB	1941		Retired list on 2 December 1995
	Roger Charles Lane-Nott, CB	1945		
	John Gordon Tolhurst, CB	1943		Retired list 1997
1993	Alexander (Sandy) Craig	1943		Surgeon Rear Admiral; Retired list on 16 May 1997
	Michael Richard Thomas			Retired list 30 April 1996
	Frederick Brian Goodson, CB, OBE	1938		Retired list 4 May 1996
	Neil Erskine Rankin, CB, CBE			Retired list 6 July 1996
	John Patrick Clarke, CB, LVO, MBE	1944		
	Frederick Peter Scourse, CB, MBE	1944		Retired list 2 May 1997
	Nicholas John Wilkinson, CB			Retired list 10 January 1998
	Terence William Loughran, CB			Retired list 12 December 1998
	David John Wood, CB			Retired list 1 June 1998
	Richard Thomas Ryder Phillips, CB			Retired list 18 July 1999
	Paul Anthony Moseley Thomas, CB			Retired list 6 June 1998
	J. H. A. J. Armstrong			Retired list 14 July 1998
	Andrew Bankes Gough, CB	1947		
	John Allan Trewby, CB			Retired list 13 June 1999
	M. P. W. H. Paine			Surgeon Rear Admiral; Retired list 4 July 1999
	Jonathan Alexander Burch, CBE	1949	2009	Retired List on 5 July 2000.
	John Chadwick, CB	1946		Retired List on 8 November 2001.
	Robert Patrick Stevens, CB	1948		
1996?	Brian Benjamin Perowne, CB	1947		
March 1994	Alan West, Baron West of Spithead, GCB, DSC	1948		Promoted Vice Admiral in 1997.
May 1997	Sir Jonathon Band, GCB	1950		Promoted Vice Admiral in 2000.
1997?	Alexander Michael Gregory, CVO, OBE	1945		retired in 2000
1998?	Rodney Burnett Lees, CVO	1944		Retired List on 2 August 2001.
1998	Iain Robert Henderson, CB, CBE	1948		Retired list 31 October 2001
14 November 1998	King Charles III	1948		as Prince of Wales; Promoted Vice Admiral in 2002
	Sir Jeremy Michael de Halpert, KCVO, CB	1947		Retired list 2002
	Sir Patrick Barton Rowe, KCVO, CBE	1939		
	Alastair Boyd Ross CB, CBE			Retired list on 31 December 1999
2000	Nigel Charles Forbes Guild, CB	1949		
2001	Niall Stuart Roderick Kilgour, CB	1950		Retired list 25 September 2004
	Rees Graham John Ward, CB			
	Christopher David Stanford, CB			
	Philip Duncan Greenish, CBE	1951		
	Peter Roland Davies, CB, CBE	1950		
	James Campsie Rapp, CB			
	Richard John Lippiett, CB, CBE	1949		
1999?	Alexander Kirkwood Backus, CB, OBE	1948		
2000	Jonathon Reeve, CB	1949		Retired list on 23 November 2004
	Roger Graham Lockwood, CB	1950		
2003	Richard Frank Cheadle, CB	1950		
13 May 2003	Nicholas Henry Linton Harris, CB, MBE	1952		Retired in 2006
27 May 2003	Sir Adrian James Johns, KCB, CBE	1951		Promoted Vice Admiral in 2005
4 August 2003	Timothy C. Chittenden			
1 December 2003	Richard G. Melly			
2004	Philip Lawrence Wilcocks, CB, DSC	1953	2023	Retired list on 14 April 2009.
	Simon Richard James Goodall, CBE			Retired list on 10 December 2005.
	Roger Stewart Ainsley			Retired list on 9 October 2006.
	David George Snelson, CB	1951		Retired list on 16 October 2006.
29 June 2004	Sir Paul Lambert, KCB	1954		Promoted Vice Admiral
5 July 2004	Sir Timothy James Hamilton Laurence, KCVO, CB	1955		Promoted Vice Admiral in 2007
30 August 2004	Christopher Hugh Trevor Clayton	1951		Retired list on 29 December 2007.
2 September 2004	Nigel John Francis Raby, OBE			Retired list on 18 November 2006.
	S. M. Henley, MBE			Retired list on 11 August 2007.
7 September 2004	Kim J. Borley, CB			Retired list on 17 August 2007.
	Robert Thomas Love, CB, OBE	1955		Retired list on 26 October 2011.
25 January 2005	Christopher John Parry, CBE	1953		Retired list on 17 May 2008.
23 June 2005	Sir Richard Jeffrey Ibbotson, KBE, CB, DSC	1954		Promoted Vice Admiral
5 July 2005	Sir Alan Michael Massey, KCB, CBE	1953		Promoted Vice Admiral in 2008
6 September 2005	Richard Derek Leaman, CB, OBE	1956		Retired list 31 Mar 2010
10 November 2005	Neil Morisetti, CB		2006	Retired
	Michael Kimmons, CB			Retired list on 13 May 2008.
	Neil Degge Latham, CBE			Retired list on 18 April 2008.
	Trevor Allan Spires, CBE			Retired list on 4 March 2009.
4 July 2006	Anthony John Rix, CB	1956		Retired list on 8 December 2010.
29 August 2006	Robert George Cooling, CB	1957		Promoted Vice Admiral
29 August 2006	Sir George Michael Zambellas, GCB, DSC	1958		Promoted Vice Admiral in 2011
31 August 2006	Amjad Mazhar Hussain, CB	1958		Retired list on 22 June 2012.
5 December 2006	Ian Moncrieff, CBE	1955		
9 January 2007	Christopher A. Snow, CBE			Retired list on 12 November 2011.
9 May 2007	Ian Peter Gordon Tibbitt, CBE			Retired list on 7 October 2009.
1 August 2007	Alan David Richards, CB	1958		Promoted Vice Admiral in 2012.
5 February 2008	Simon Boyce Charlier, CBE	1958		
14 February 2008	Sir Philip Andrew Jones, KCB	1960		Promoted Vice Admiral in 2011.
8 April 2008	Sir Simon Robert Lister, KCB OBE	1959		Promoted Vice Admiral in 2013.
2 June 2008	Lionel John Jarvis, CBE	1955		Surgeon Rear Admiral; Retired list on 26 June 2012.
2008	Martin Brian Alabaster, CBE	1958		Retired list on 3 January 2012.
10 November 2008	Stephen John Lloyd, CBE			
2 March 2009	Sir Frederick Donald Gosling, KCVO	1929	2019	Honorary Rear Admiral Royal Naval Reserve; promoted Honorary Vice Admiral RNR in 2015
19 February 2010	The Prince Andrew, Duke of York, KG, GCVO, ADC	1960		Promoted Vice Admiral in 2015
29 March 2010	Thomas Anthony Cunningham, CBE			Retired list on 5 January 2013.
28 April 2010	Alan R. Rymer			Retired list on 13 June 2012.
30 April 2010	Sir David George Steel, KBE	1961		Promoted Vice Admiral in 2012
7 June 2010	Philip B. Mathias, CBE			Retired list on 16 January 2012.
1 August 2010	Jeffrey Maurice Sterling, Baron Sterling of Plaistow, GCVO, CBE	1934		Honorary Rear Admiral Royal Naval Reserve, promoted Honorary Vice Admiral RNR in 2015
14 February 2011	Jonathan Simon Westbrook, CBE			Retired list on 13 August 2013.
1 March 2011	Russell George Harding, CBE			Retired list on 3 November 2015.
28 November 2011	John Howard James Gower, CB OBE	1960		Retired list on 18 April 2015.
16 January 2012	Sir Timothy Peter Fraser, KCB			Promoted Vice Admiral in 2017
6 February 2012	Henry Hardyman Parker, CB	1963		Retired list on 11 December 2016.
3 July 2012	Ian Michael Jess, CBE			Retired list on 28 August 2015.
23 July 2012	Mark A. Beverstock			Retired list on 24 November 2016.
28 August 2012	James Anthony Morse, CB			Retired list on 12 August 2016.
11 September 2012	Simon Jonathan Woodcock, OBE	1962		Promoted Vice Admiral in 2015
17 September 2012	Timothy Miles Lowe, CBE	1963		
17 September 2012	Simon Paul Williams, CB, CVO			Retired list on 16 October 2018.
14 December 2012	Thomas Michael Karsten, CBE	1961		Retired list on 19 September 2015.
14 January 2013	Robert Kenneth Tarrant, CB	1961		Retired list on 11 May 2018.
4 February 2013	Paul Martin Bennett, CB, OBE	1964		Promoted Vice Admiral in 2018
30 April 2013	Sir Benjamin John Key, KCB, CBE	1965		Promoted Vice Admiral in 2016
30 September 2013	Michael P. Wareham			Retired list on 4 May 2017.
7 October 2013	Malcolm Charles Cree, CBE			Retired list on 9 April 2016.
14 October 2013	Simon James Ancona, CBE	1963		Retired list on 20 July 2017.
14 October 2013	John Matthew Leonard Kingwell, CBE	1966		Retired list on 1 January 2021.
27 May 2014	Graeme Angus MacKay, CBE			Retired list on 15 May 2018.
26 August 2014	John Robert Hamilton Clink, CBE	1964		Retired list on 20 September 2018.
28 October 2014	Alexander J. Burton			Retired list on 3 February 2018.
4 November 2014	Keith Andrew Beckett, CBE	1963		Retired list on 2 July 2018.
3 December 2014	Sir Antony David Radakin, GBE, KCB	1965		Promoted Vice Admiral in 2018
14 April 2015	Richard Stokes, CBE	1966		Retired list on 4 May 2018.
18 May 2015	John Stuart Weale, CB, OBE	1962		Retired list on 6 May 2020.
29 May 2015	Sir Keith Edward Blount, KCB, OBE	1966		Promoted Vice Admiral in 2019
6 July 2015	Paul Anthony McAlpine, CBE	1962		Retired list on 7 April 2018.
1 September 2015	Sir Nicholas William Hine, KCB	1966		Promoted Vice Admiral in 2019
30 November 2015	Sir Christopher Reginald Summers Gardner, KBE	1962		Promoted Vice Admiral in 2019
8 December 2015	Paul Austin Chivers, CBE	1962		Retired list on 9 March 2019.
1 July 2016	Timothy Charles Hodgson, CB, MBE	1963		Retired list on 9 August 2023.
27 September 2016	Richard Charles Thompson, CBE	1966		Promoted Vice Admiral in 2020
12 December 2016	Simon P. Hardern			Retired list on 1 September 2018.
5 January 2017	Paul Methven, CB	1969		Retired list on 1 December 2020.
16 January 2017	William Nicholas Entwisle, OBE, MVO			Retired list on 25 August 2019.
4 April 2017	Jonathan Patrick Pentreath, CB, OBE	1966		Retired list on 1 August 2020.
24 October 2017	Paul Vincent Halton, OBE			Retired list on 18 March 2023.
13 November 2017	Guy Antony Robinson CB, OBE	1967		Promoted Vice Admiral in 2021
2 January 2018	Matthew Peter Briers, CBE	1966		Retired list on 1 June 2021.
9 April 2018	James David Morley, CB	1969		Promoted Vice Admiral in 2024
12 June 2018	William Jonathan Warrender, CBE	1968		Retired list on 28 July 2020.
26 June 2018	Michael Anthony William Bath	1966		Retired list on 1 May 2020.
3 July 2018	Malcolm J. Toy			Retired list on 8 February 2022.
28 October 2018	Jeremy Paul Kyd, CBE	1967		Promoted Vice Admiral in 2019
19 November 2018	Sir Andrew Jeffery Kyte, KBE, CB	1966		Promoted Vice Admiral in 2023
26 November 2018	Hugh Dominic Beard, CB	1967		Retired list on 27 December 2022.
20 February 2019	Sir Martin John Connell, KCB, CBE	1968		Promoted Vice Admiral in 2022
25 February 2019	Andrew Paul Burns, CB, OBE	1969		Promoted Vice Admiral in 2021
25 February 2019	Paul Marshall, CB, CBE			Promoted Vice Admiral in 2023
26 February 2019	James Godfrey Higham, CB, OBE	1969		
27 March 2019	James Norman Macleod, CB, CVO	1970		Retired list on 14 September 2022.
20 May 2019	Philip John Hally, CB, MBE			Promoted Vice Admiral in 2022
2 September 2019	Andrew Betton, CB, OBE	1968		Retired list on 7 May 2025.
14 October 2019	Simon Philip Asquith, CB, OBE	1972		Promoted Vice Admiral in 2024
28 October 2019	Peter James Sparkes	1967		
16 December 2019	Sir Michael Keith Utley, KCB, OBE	1970		Promoted Vice Admiral in 2023
8 September 2020	Rhett Slade Hatcher	1966		Retired list on 2 November 2023.
24 November 2020	Iain Stuart Lower, CB			Retired list on 12 November 2022.
1 March 2021	Nicholas B. J. Washer			Retired list on 2 December 2024.
26 May 2021	Paul Spence Beattie, CBE	1969		Retired list on 23 August 2024; recalled and promoted Vice Admiral in 2025
22 June 2021	Donald J. M. Doull, CBE			Retired list on 30 October 2024.
11 July 2021	Richard Anthony Murrison	1965		
26 July 2021	Rex John Cox, CB			Retired list on 1 January 2025.
2 August 2021	Paul Christopher Carroll, OBE	1970		
16 August 2021	James Miles Benjamin Parkin, CB, CBE	1974		Retired list on 24 December 2025.
18 October 2021	Timothy Michael Henry, OBE	1970		Retired list on 23 May 2025.
1 November 2021	Thomas Edward Manson, CB, OBE			Retired List on 17 May 2025.
10 January 2022	Stephen Mark Richard Moorhouse, CBE	1973		Promoted Vice Admiral in 2025
17 January 2022	Judith Helen Terry, CB, OBE	1973		
27 April 2022	Edward Graham Ahlgren, OBE	1971		Promoted Vice Admiral in 2024
14 June 2022	Stephen W. J. A. Higham, OBE			
11 July 2022	Nicholas J. Wheeler			Retired List on 20 February 2026.
18 July 2022	Steven Dainton, CBE	1967		
26 September 2022	Robert George Pedre, CB	1975		Promoted Vice Admiral in 2026
1 November 2022	Anthony K. Rimington			
28 February 2023	Jeremy J. Bailey			Retired List on 19 September 2025.
28 February 2023	Timothy Christopher Woods, CBE			Retired List on 13 July 2026.
8 March 2023	Robert Alexander Lauchlan, CB			
21 March 2023	Fleur T. Marshall	1972		Surgeon Rear Admiral
3 April 2023	Christopher E. Shepherd, CB			Retired List on 1 November 2025.
9 May 2023	Ivan R. Finn			
27 June 2023	Angus N. P. Essenhigh, OBE			
12 October 2023	Steven J. McCarthy, CB			
23 October 2023	Paul A. Murphy			
9 April 2024	Craig Wood, CBE			
22 April 2024	Andrew B. Perks, MBE			
10 June 2024	Paul A. Stroude			
1 September 2024	Fiona R. Shepherd, MBE			
23 June 2025	Richard A. Harris			
August 2025	Philip Gordon Game, CBE			
2025?	Daniel M. D′Silva, CBE			
9 September 2025	Mark Edgar John Anderson, CBE			
6 January 2026	Andrew Donald Rose, OBE			
2 February 2026	Matthew P. Stratton			
3 March 2026	Rachel M. Singleton, MBE			
15 June 2026	Anthony S. Williams			
24 August 2026	Marcus E. Rose			
1 September 2026	J. E. S. Jenny			Royal Naval Reserve

== See also ==
- List of senior officers of the Royal Navy
- List of British Army full generals
- List of Royal Navy admirals
- List of Royal Navy vice admirals
