= Admiral Jenkins =

Admiral Jenkins may refer to:

- Ian Jenkins (Royal Navy officer) (1944–2009), British Royal Navy vice admiral
- Thornton A. Jenkins (1811–1893), U.S. Navy rear admiral
- William A. Jenkins (1917–2022), U.S. Coast Guard rear admiral

== See also ==
- David Conrad Jenkin (fl. 1980s) in the list of Royal Navy rear admirals
- Albert Baldwin Jenkings (1846–1942) in the list of Royal Navy rear admirals
