= Admiral Gardner =

Admiral Gardner may refer to:

- Alan Gardner, 1st Baron Gardner (1742–1809), British Royal Navy admiral
- Alan Gardner, 2nd Baron Gardner (1770–1815), British Royal Navy admiral
- Christopher Gardner (Royal Navy officer) (born 1962), British Royal Navy vice admiral
- Matthias B. Gardner (1897–1975), U.S. Navy vice admiral
- Admiral Gardner (1797 EIC ship)
