= Fourth Sea Lord =

Senior British naval officer in charge of logistics

Office of the Chief of Materiel (Fleet)
- Ensign of the Royal Navy

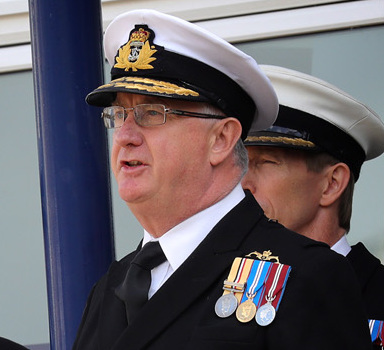
- Incumbent; Vice Admiral Sir Christopher Gardner since 2019
- Department of the Admiralty, Ministry of Defence
- Member of: Board of Admiralty, Admiralty Board, Navy Board
- Reports to: First Sea Lord
- Nominator: First Lord of the Admiralty, Secretary of State for Defence
- Appointer: Prime Minister; Subject to formal approval by the King-in-Council
- Term length: Not fixed (typically 1–3 years)
- Inaugural holder: Captain George Barrington
- Formation: 1830–1964, 1965–current

The Fourth Sea Lord and Chief of Naval Supplies, originally known as the Fourth Naval Lord, was formerly one of the Naval Lords and a member of the Board of Admiralty, which controlled the Royal Navy of the United Kingdom. After the creation of the Ministry of Defence, the equivalent role was Chief of Fleet Support. The role currently falls within the remit of Defence Equipment and Support; since 2020 it has been known as Director General (Ships).

== Duties ==
In 1805, for the first time, specific functions were assigned to each of the 'Naval' Lords, who were described as 'Professional' Lords, leaving to the 'Civil' Lords the routine business of signing documents.

The Fourth Sea Lord as Chief of Naval Supplies was responsible for supplying the navy, and his responsibilities included transport, victualling (supplying food), and medical services.

== History ==
The origin of this appointment dates back to 1830 when the post of Fourth Naval Lord was created until 1868 when it was re-styled Junior Naval Lord; this title remained until 1904 when it was again re-styled Fourth Sea Lord until 1964 when the Admiralty Department abolished this post. Its functions along with two other departments of state were merged within a new Ministry of Defence. Following the merger a new post of Chief of Fleet Support was created, assuming the same responsibilities and duties.

=== 21st century ===
In 2001 Rear Admiral Brian Perowne was serving as 'Chief Executive, Naval Bases and Supply Agency and Chief of Fleet Support'. His immediate successor, Jonathon Reeve, was 'Deputy Chief Executive, Warship Support Agency and Navy Member for Logistics'. In 2005 the Warship Support Agency was subsumed within the Defence Logistics Organisation; the role then became 'Director-General Logistics (Fleet) and Navy Board Member for Logistics'.

In 2007, following the formation of Defence Equipment and Support, Vice Admiral Trevor Soar was appointed 'Chief of Materiel (Fleet) and Chief of Fleet Support to the Naval Board'. In 2017 (when a retired Air Marshal was appointed), the role was retitled Chief of Materiel (Ships). In June 2020, in common with the other 'Chief of Materiel' roles, it was renamed again as 'Director General (Ships)', so as "to bring DE&S in line with other Civil Service departments and better reflect our business focus".

== Chronological list ==
=== Fourth Naval Lords 1830–1868 ===
Fourth Naval Lords include:

- Captain George Barrington 1830–1833
- Rear Admiral Sir Maurice Berkeley 1833–1835
- Rear Admiral Sir Sir Edward Troubridge, 2nd Baronet 1835–1837
- Rear Admiral Sir Maurice Berkeley 1837–1839
- Rear Admiral Sir Samuel Pechell 1839–1841
- Rear Admiral Sir James Dundas 1841
- Rear Admiral Sir William Gordon 1841–1846
- Rear Admiral Sir Henry Rous 1846
- Rear Admiral Lord John Hay 1846–1847
- Rear Admiral Sir Alexander Milne 1847–1852
- Rear Admiral Arthur Duncombe 1852–1853
- Rear Admiral Sir Alexander Milne 1853–1857
- Rear Admiral Sir Frederick Pelham 1857–1858
- Rear Admiral Sir James Drummond 1858–1859
- Rear Admiral Sir Swynfen Carnegie 1859
- Rear Admiral Sir Alexander Milne 1859
- Rear Admiral Charles Frederick 1859–1861
- Rear Admiral Sir James Drummond 1861–1866
- Rear Admiral Sir John Dalrymple-Hay, 3rd Baronet 1866–1868

=== Junior Naval Lords 1868–1904 ===
Junior Naval Lords include:

- Rear Admiral Lord John Hay 1868–1871
- Rear Admiral Sir John Tarleton 1871–1872
- Rear Admiral Sir Beauchamp Seymour 1872–1874
- Rear Admiral Richard Meade, Baron Gillford 1874–1879
- Rear Admiral Sir John Commerell 1879–1880
- Rear Admiral Sir Anthony Hoskins 1880–1882
- Rear Admiral Sir Frederick Richards 1882–1885
- Vice Admiral Sir William Hewett 1885
- Captain William Codrington 1885–1886
- Rear Admiral Sir James Erskine 1886
- Captain Lord Charles Beresford 1886–1888
- Rear Admiral Sir Charles Hotham 1888–1889
- Rear Admiral Frederick Bedford 1889–1892
- Rear Admiral Lord Walter Kerr 1892–1893
- Rear Admiral Sir Gerard Noel 1893–1898
- Rear Admiral Sir Arthur Moore 1898–1901
- Rear Admiral Sir John Durnford 1901–1903
- Captain Sir Frederick Inglefield 1903

=== Fourth Sea Lords 1904–1917 ===
Fourth Sea Lords include:

- Rear Admiral Sir Frederick Inglefield 1904–1907
- Rear Admiral Sir Alfred Winsloe 1907–1910
- Rear Admiral Sir Charles Madden 1910–1911
- Rear Admiral Sir William Pakenham 1911–1913
- Rear Admiral Sir Cecil Lambert 1913–1916
- Rear Admiral Sir Lionel Halsey 1916–1917
- Rear Admiral Sir Hugh Tothill May 1917 – October 1917

=== Fourth Sea Lord and Chief of Naval Supplies and Transport 1917–1964 ===
Included:

- Rear Admiral Sir Hugh Tothill October 1917–?
- Captain Sir Ernle Chatfield 1919–1920
- Vice Admiral Sir Algernon Boyle 1920–1924
- Rear Admiral Sir John Kelly 1924–1927
- Rear Admiral Sir William Fisher 1927–1928
- Vice Admiral Sir Vernon Haggard 1928–1930
- Vice Admiral Sir Lionel Preston 1930–1932
- Rear Admiral Sir Geoffrey Blake 1932–1935
- Vice Admiral Sir Percy Noble 1935–1937
- Vice Admiral Sir Geoffrey Arbuthnot 1937–1941
- Vice Admiral Sir John Cunningham 1941–1943
- Vice Admiral Frank Pegram 1943–1944
- Vice Admiral Sir Arthur Palliser 1944–1946
- Vice Admiral Sir Douglas Fisher 1946–1948
- Vice Admiral Sir Herbert Packer 1948–1950
- Vice Admiral Louis Mountbatten, 1st Earl Mountbatten of Burma 1950–1952
- Vice Admiral Sir Sydney Raw 1952–1954
- Vice Admiral Sir Frederick Parham 1954–1955
- Vice Admiral Sir Dymock Watson 1955–1958
- Vice Admiral Sir Gordon Hubback 1958–1959
- Vice Admiral Sir Nicholas Copeman 1959–1960
- Vice Admiral Sir Michael Villiers 1960–1964
- Vice Admiral Sir Raymond Hawkins 1964

=== Chief of Fleet Support 1964–2007 ===
Chiefs of Fleet Support include:

- Vice Admiral Sir Raymond Hawkins 1964–1967
- Admiral Sir Francis Turner 1967–1971
- Vice Admiral Sir Allan Trewby 1971–1974
- Admiral Sir Peter White 1974–1977
- Vice Admiral Sir James Eberle 1977–1979
- Vice Admiral Sir William Pillar 1979–1981
- Vice Admiral Sir James Kennon 1981–1983
- Vice Admiral Sir Anthony Tippet 1983–1986
- Vice Admiral Sir Benjamin Bathurst 1986–1989
- Vice Admiral Sir Jock Slater 1989–1991
- Vice Admiral Sir Neville Purvis 1991–1994
- Vice Admiral Sir Toby Frere 1994–1997
- Vice Admiral Sir John Dunt 1997–2000
- Rear Admiral Brian Perowne 2000–2001

=== Navy (Board) Member for Logistics 2001-2007 ===
- Rear Admiral Jonathon Reeve 2001–2004
- Rear Admiral Paul Boissier 2004–2006
- Rear Admiral Amjad Hussain 2006–2007

=== Chief of Materiel (Fleet) and Chief of Fleet Support 2007–2017 ===
Chiefs of Materiel (Fleet) include:

- Vice Admiral Sir Trevor Soar 2007–2009
- Vice Admiral Sir Andrew Mathews 2009–2013
- Vice Admiral Sir Simon Lister 2013–2017

=== Chief of Materiel (Ships) 2017–2020 ===
Chief of Materiel (Ships) include

- Sir Simon Bollom 2017-2018
- Vice Admiral Christopher Gardner 2019–2020

=== Director General (Ships) from 2020–present ===
- Vice Admiral Sir Christopher Gardner 2020 - 2022?

== Departments under the office ==
In July 1945 the Fourth Sea Lord supervised the Department of the Director of Dockyards, and his Deputy Director, a vice and rear admiral respectively; and the Director, Naval Stores, a civilian.

At other times the Fourth Sea Lord also supervised:

- Auxiliary Patrol Office
- Defence Equipment and Support (Fleet)
  - DE&S Investment Board
- Department of the Director of Mineweeping
- Department of the Director of Naval Equipment
- Department of the Director of Victualling (1878–1964)
- Dockyard Expense Accounts Department
- Naval Bases Operating Centre
- Office of the Comptroller of Victualling (1832–1870)
- Office of the Director of Transports (1855–1857)
- Office of the Director of Prisoners of War (1855–1857)
- Office of the Director of Transport Service (1862–1896)
- Office of the Director Ships Acquisitions
- Office of the Director Ships Support
- Office of the Director Submarines Acquisitions
- Office of the Director Submarines Support
- Office of the Superintendent of Victualling (1870–1878)
- Royal Navy Bases
- Superintendent of Transports (1829–1855)
- Transport Department

== See also ==
- First Sea Lord
- Second Sea Lord
- Third Sea Lord
- Fifth Sea Lord
