= Admiral Hawkins =

Admiral Hawkins may refer to:

- John Hawkins (naval commander) (1532–1595), English Navy vice admiral
- Raymond Hawkins (1909–1987), British Royal Navy vice admiral
- Richard Hawkins (c. 1562–1622), English Navy vice admiral

== See also ==
- James Hawkins-Whitshed (1762–1849), British Royal Navy admiral
