= Trevor Soar =

Retired Royal Navy Admiral (born 1957)

Admiral Sir Trevor Soar KCB OBE DL
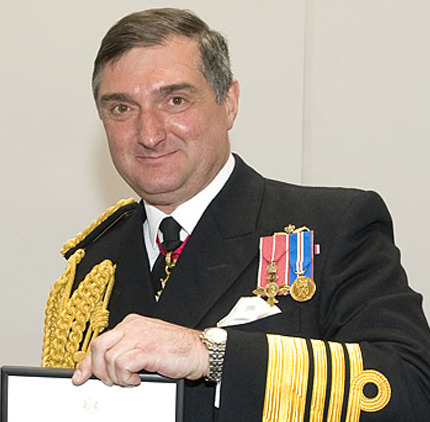
- Admiral Soar in 2010
- Born: 21 March 1957 (age 69); Belper, Derbyshire, England
- Military career
- Allegiance: United Kingdom
- Branch: Royal Navy
- Service years: 1975–2012
- Rank: Admiral
- Commands: Fleet; HMS Invincible; HMS Chatham; HMS Talent; HMS Ocelot
- Awards: Knight Commander of the Order of the Bath; Officer of the Order of the British Empire

Admiral Sir Trevor Alan Soar, KCB, OBE, DL (born 21 March 1957) is a retired Royal Navy officer who served as Commander-in-Chief Fleet from 2009 to 2012.

== Early life ==
Soar was born in Belper and educated at Loughborough Grammar School. He joined the Royal Navy in 1975, attending Britannia Royal Naval College at Dartmouth.

== Naval career ==
Soar commanded the submarines HMS Ocelot from 1987 to 1990 and HMS Talent from 1991 to 1994. He went on to command the frigate HMS Chatham from 1997 to 1998. His next appointment was ashore as Director of Naval Staff Duties at the Ministry of Defence from September 2000 to August 2002. Next appointed as commanding officer of the aircraft carrier HMS Invincible from 2002 to 2004. Trevor Soar was appointed Capability Manager (Precision Attack) in 2004 in the rank of rear admiral and was promoted to Chief of Materiel (Fleet), Defence Equipment & Support in the rank of vice admiral in 2007.

Soar was promoted to admiral and appointed as Commander-in-Chief Fleet and Allied Maritime Component Commander, Northwood, on 10 June 2009. He also held the honorary position of Vice-Admiral of the United Kingdom from 2009 to 2012. His role as Allied Maritime Component Commander, Northwood was redesigned as Commander Allied Maritime Command in 2010.

In an October 2012 article, the Sunday Times alleged that Soar was among several retired military leaders who had offered to lobby and influence MPs and government defence ministers on behalf of arms firms. He resigned, after admitting he had to be slightly careful of lobbying ministers. "There's no reason I can't see them but there's again some criteria on that." However, he claimed that he had not broken Whitehall rules.

== Private military career ==
After leaving the military, Soar has worked for several private arms or security companies. In 2012, he took up roles with British Maritime Security, Vessel Protection Services and Babcock International.

== Honours ==
- Knight Commander of the Order of the Bath (KCB) in the 2009 New Year Honours.
- Officer of the Order of the British Empire (OBE)
- Honorary doctorate from Heriot-Watt University 2005

== Personal life ==
In 1978 Soar married Anne Matlock. They have two sons (Gareth and David), who attended Denstone College. They live in Boylestone in Derbyshire. He is President of Royal Navy Rugby Union.

Military offices
Preceded by Amjad Hussain (as Chief of Fleet Support)	Chief of Materiel Fleet; 2007–2009	Succeeded by Andrew Mathews
Preceded by Sir Mark Stanhope	Commander-in-Chief Fleet; 2009–2012	Succeeded by Sir George Zambellas
Honorary titles
Preceded by Sir Mark Stanhope	Vice-Admiral of the United Kingdom; 2009–2012	Succeeded by Sir George Zambellas
