= Paul Boissier (Royal Navy officer) =

Royal Navy admiral

Vice Admiral Paul Boissier CB
- Born: 14 October 1953 (age 73)
- Military career
- Allegiance: United Kingdom
- Branch: Royal Navy
- Service years: 1974–2009
- Rank: Vice Admiral
- Awards: Companion of the Order of the Bath

Vice Admiral Robin Paul Boissier, CB (born 14 October 1953) is a former Royal Navy officer who served as Chief of Fleet Support from 2004 to 2006.

== Personal life ==
Boissier is the only son of Peter Clement Boissier, formerly of the Royal Naval Volunteer Reserve, and his wife Joan Rosemary (née Yeomans),

Boissier is married to Susie.

== Naval career ==
Boissier joined the Royal Navy in 1974. He was appointed Deputy Commander, Strike Force South in 2003, Director-General Logistics (Fleet) and Chief of Fleet Support in 2004, and Deputy Commander-in-Chief Fleet and Chief Naval Warfare Officer in 2006. He retired in 2009.

== Later life ==
In retirement Boissier became Chief Executive of the Royal National Lifeboat Institution. Vice Admiral Boissier retired from the RNLI in May 2019 and was succeeded by Mark Dowie.

Military offices
Preceded by Jonathon Reeve	Chief of Fleet Support; 2004–2006	Succeeded by Amjad Hussain
Preceded by Sir Timothy McClement	Deputy Commander-in-Chief Fleet; 2006–2009	Succeeded by Sir Richard Ibbotson
