= Hugh Tothill =

Royal Navy Admiral (1865–1927)

Admiral Sir Hugh Tothill KCB KCMG KCVO
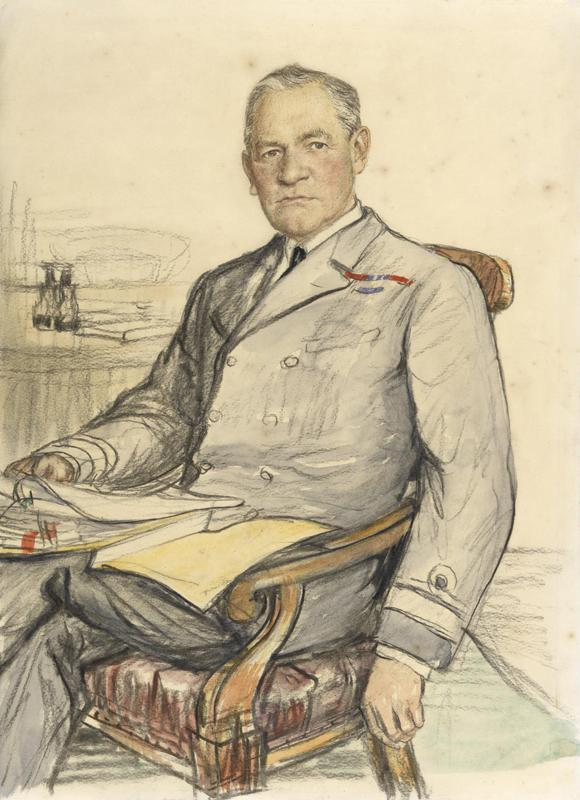
- 1918 portrait by Francis Dodd
- Born: 14 March 1865
- Died: 25 September 1927 (aged 62)
- Military career
- Allegiance: United Kingdom
- Branch: Royal Navy
- Rank: Admiral
- Commands: HMS Illustrious; HMS Lancaster; HMS Conqueror; East Indies Station
- Conflicts: World War I
- Awards: Knight Commander of the Order of the Bath; Knight Commander of the Order of St Michael and St George; Knight Commander of the Royal Victorian Order

Admiral Sir Hugh Henry Darby Tothill, KCB, KCMG, KCVO (14 March 1865 – 25 September 1927) was a Royal Navy officer who served as captain in World War I and went on to become commander-in-chief of East Indies Station following his promotion to admiral.

== Naval career ==
Tothill was promoted to lieutenant in 1888, commander on 31 December 1900, and subsequently to captain in 1905. He was in command of the training brig HMS Nautilus from 20 January 1898 until 31 December 1900. In March 1900 he re-commissioned the brig at Devonport with a complement of boys for the annual training cruise. After promotion to commander, he was in January 1901 posted to the armoured cruiser HMS Australia, serving in home waters.

Having received command of HMS Illustrious by 1908 and HMS Lancaster by 1911, he served in World War I, commanding HMS Conqueror at the Battle of Jutland in 1916. For this service, he was appointed a Companion of the Order of the Bath (CB) on the recommendation of Vice-Admiral Sir Martyn Jerram.

He was appointed Fourth Sea Lord in 1917 and served as Commander-in-chief at East Indies Station from 1919 to 1921 before becoming Admiral Commanding the Reserves in 1923. He retired from military service in 1926 and died in 1927.

He was appointed a Knight Commander of the Royal Victorian Order (KCVO) with effect from 23 November 1921, and a Knight Commander of the Order of the Bath (KCB) in the 1923 Birthday Honours.

Military offices
Preceded by Sir Lionel Halsey	Fourth Sea Lord; 1917–1919	Succeeded by Sir Ernle Chatfield
Preceded by Sir Ernest Gaunt	Commander-in-Chief, East Indies Station; 1921–1923	Succeeded by Sir Lewis Clinton-Baker
