= Francis Turner (Royal Navy officer) =

Royal Navy Admiral (1912–1991)

Admiral Sir Francis Turner KCB DSC
- Nickname: Attie
- Born: 23 June 1912
- Died: 26 October 1991 (aged 79)
- Allegiance: United Kingdom
- Branch: Royal Navy
- Service years: 1931 - 1971
- Rank: Admiral
- Conflicts: World War II
- Awards: Knight Commander of the Order of the Bath; Distinguished Service Cross

Admiral Sir Arthur Francis Turner KCB DSC (23 June 1912 – 26 October 1991) was a British naval officer. He was the son of Rear Admiral AWJ Turner and his wife Mrs AM Turner (née Lochrane).

== Naval career ==
He entered the navy in 1931, completing a four-year course at the Royal Naval Engineering College at Keyham. During the Second World War Turner travelled to Halifax, Nova Scotia, to commission and bring back HMS Newark to the United Kingdom; then spent a period at the RNEC and at HMS Condor (the Royal Naval Air Station at Arbroath), before joining the aircraft carrier HMS Indomitable in 1944 as air engineer officer. Indomitable was the carrier squadron flagship in the British Pacific Fleet and Turner's department maintained a very high aircraft serviceability rate for the fleet's strikes. Turner was twice mentioned in despatches, having taken part in air strikes against Okinawa, Japan in 1945.

After the Second World War, Turner planned the Royal Australian Navy's Fleet Air Arm. From 1954 Turner served in the Engineer in Chief's department at Bath, laying the foundation for the Navy's planned maintenance organisation. His other positions included: Captain Superintendent of the Royal Naval Aircraft Yard at Donibristle (1956–58), Director of Aircraft Maintenance and Planning in London, Chief Staff Officer (Technical) on the Central Staff, Mediterranean Fleet (1962–64), Director-General of Aircraft (Navy) at the Ministry of Defence (1964–67) and Chief of Fleet Support at the Ministry of Defence (1967–71). Turner was promoted to Vice-Admiral in June 1968. In 1970, Turner made naval history by becoming the first officer of a non-executive branch to reach the rank of full Admiral. He was one of the Navy's first specialists in naval aeronautical engineering and pioneered the introduction of planned maintenance to improve the reliability of the fleet's machinery. He retired in 1971.

== Personal life ==
In 1963 Turner married Elizabeth Clare de Trafford, daughter of Captain Edmund Hubert de Trafford (a grandson of Sir Humphrey de Trafford, 2nd Baronet) and his wife Hon. Cecilia Strickland (2nd daughter of Baron Gerald Strickland). They raised two sons: Francis (b. 1966) and Michael (b. 1969). The family settled at Effingham, Surrey where Lady Turner lived in retirement until her death on 30 November 2011, aged 79.

Military offices
Preceded by Sir Raymond Hawkins	Chief of Fleet Support; 1967-1971	Succeeded by Sir Allan Trewby
