= Henry Parker (Royal Navy officer) =

Royal Navy Rear Admiral (born 1963)

Rear Admiral Henry Parker CB
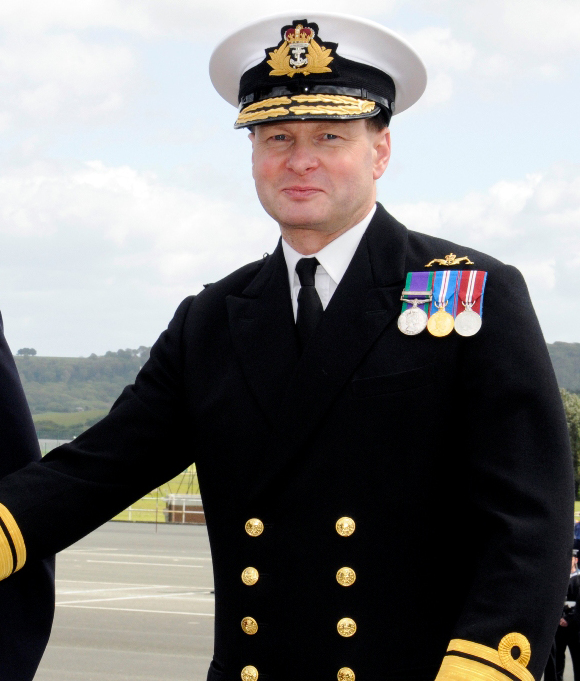
- Rear Admiral Parker in 2013
- Born: 20 December 1963 (age 62); Cheltenham, United Kingdom
- Allegiance: United Kingdom
- Branch: Royal Navy
- Service years: –2016
- Rank: Rear Admiral
- Awards: Companion of the Order of the Bath

Rear-Admiral Henry Hardyman Parker, CB (born 20 December 1963) is a retired senior Royal Navy officer who served as Director (Carrier Strike).

== Naval career ==
Parker was commissioned into the engineering branch of the Royal Navy and served on the aircraft carrier HMS Invincible. He became Director (Maritime capability and Transformation) and Controller of the Navy in 2012 and continued as Director (Carrier Strike) at the Ministry of Defence in 2013. He retired from the Royal Navy on 11 December 2016.

Parker was appointed Companion of the Order of the Bath (CB) in the 2016 Birthday Honours.

Military offices
Preceded by Amjad Hussain	Controller of the Navy; 2012–2013	Succeeded by Duncan Potts
