= Jonathon Reeve =

Royal Navy Rear Admiral (born 1949)

Rear Admiral Jonathon Reeve CB
- Born: 1 October 1949 (age 77)
- Military career
- Allegiance: United Kingdom
- Branch: Royal Navy
- Rank: Rear Admiral
- Awards: Companion of the Order of the Bath

Rear Admiral Jonathon Reeve CB (born 1 October 1949) is a former Royal Navy officer who ended his naval career as Chief of Fleet Support.

== Naval career ==
Educated at St Catharine's College, Cambridge, Reeve joined the Royal Navy in 1967 and specialized in engineering. He was appointed Commander of HM Naval Base Plymouth in 1998 and, following promotion to rear admiral in 2000, he became Change Director at Fleet Headquarters in 2000. He went on to be Chief of Fleet Support as well as Naval Member for Logistics on the Navy Board in December 2000 before retiring in 2004.

In retirement he became a Non-Executive Director of Oxford Metrics Group.

Military offices
Preceded by Brian Perowne	Chief of Fleet Support; 2000-2004	Succeeded by Paul Boissier
