= James Kennon =

Vice-Admiral Sir James Kennon KCB CBE
- Born: James Edward Campbell Kennon; 26 November 1925; Liverpool, England
- Died: 22 January 1991 (aged 65); Hampshire, England
- Military career
- Allegiance: United Kingdom
- Branch: Royal Navy
- Service years: 1945 – 1983
- Rank: Vice-Admiral
- Awards: Knight Commander of the Order of the Bath; Commander of the Order of the British Empire

Vice-Admiral Sir James Edward Campbell Kennon KCB CBE (26 November 1925 – 22 January 1991) was a Royal Navy officer who ended his career as Chief of Fleet Support.

He was educated at Stowe School.

== Naval career ==
Kennon joined the Royal Navy in 1945. On promotion to rear admiral, he was appointed Assistant Chief of the Naval Staff (Policy) in 1978 and Port Admiral at Rosyth as well as Chief Naval Supply & Secretariat Officer in 1979. Following promotion to vice admiral, he became Chief of Fleet Support in 1981. In that capacity he managed the run-down of Chatham Dockyard before he retired in 1983. He died in January 1991.

Military offices
Preceded by Sir William Pillar	Chief of Fleet Support; 1981-1983	Succeeded by Sir Anthony Tippet
