= Anthony Tippet =

Vice-Admiral Sir Anthony Tippet KCB
- Born: 2 October 1928
- Died: 13 October 2006 (aged 78)
- Military career
- Allegiance: United Kingdom
- Branch: Royal Navy
- Service years: 1946 - 1987
- Rank: Vice-Admiral
- Awards: Knight Commander of the Order of the Bath

Vice-Admiral Sir Anthony Sanders Tippet KCB (2 October 1928 – 13 October 2006) was a Royal Navy officer who ended his career as Chief of Fleet Support.

== Naval career ==
Educated at West Buckland School in Devon, Tippet joined the Royal Navy in 1946. He was subsequently called to the Bar at Gray's Inn in 1958. He commanded, as a Commander, HMS Jufair in Bahrain in the 1960s and became Assistant Director of the Naval Plans at the Admiralty and then commanded HMS Pembroke, the Royal Naval Barracks at Chatham.

Promoted to Rear-Admiral on 7 July 1979, he was appointed Assistant Chief of Fleet Support in 1979 and then Flag Officer and Port Admiral at Portsmouth as well as Chief Naval Supply & Secretariat Officer in 1981. Promoted to Vice-Admiral, he was appointed Chief of Fleet Support in 1983 and retired in 1987.

In retirement he became General Manager and then Chief Executive of the Great Ormond Street Hospital. He lived at Barnstaple in Devon.

== Family ==
In 1950 he married Lola Bassett; they had three sons, Simon, Mark & Charles and one daughter, named AEneone.

Military offices
Preceded by Sir James Kennon	Chief of Fleet Support; 1983-1986	Succeeded by Sir Benjamin Bathurst
