= Allan Trewby =

Vice-Admiral Sir Allan Trewby KCB
- Born: 8 July 1917; Simon's Town, South Africa
- Died: 23 July 2001 (aged 84); Wokingham, Berkshire, England
- Military career
- Allegiance: United Kingdom
- Branch: Royal Navy
- Service years: 1931–1974
- Rank: Vice-Admiral
- Conflicts: World War II; Suez Crisis
- Awards: Knight Commander of the Order of the Bath

Vice-Admiral Sir George Francis Allan Trewby KCB (8 July 1917 – 23 July 2001) was a Royal Navy officer who ended his career as Chief of Fleet Support.

== Naval career ==
Born the eldest son of Vice Admiral George Trewby and educated at the Royal Naval College, Dartmouth, Trewby joined the Royal Navy as a cadet in 1931 and chose to specialize in engineering. He served in World War II on the battleship HMS Nelson which was damaged by a German mine, on the battleship HMS Duke of York during the Allied landings in North Africa and on the cruiser HMS Dido during the Allied landings in Sicily, Italy, and the south of France. He was mentioned in dispatches for his service on HMS Dido.

In 1954 was the winner of the Akroyd Stuart Award from the Institute of Marine Engineering. After serving at sea during the Suez Crisis in 1956, he was appointed Director of Engineering at the Royal Naval Engineering College. He was appointed Commander of the training establishment HMS Sultan in 1963 and Captain of HM Naval Base Portland in 1966. Promoted Rear Admiral in 1968, he became Assistant Controller for the Polaris Programme at the Ministry of Defence in 1968, and following promotion to vice admiral, was made Chief of Fleet Support in 1971; he retired in 1974.

In retirement Trewby joined Foster Wheeler in Reading.

== Family ==
In 1942 he married Sandra Stedham; they had two sons. Lady Trewby died in 2017.

Military offices
Preceded by Sir Francis Turner	Chief of Fleet Support; 1971–1974	Succeeded by Sir Peter White
