= Brian Perowne =

Royal Navy Rear Admiral (born 1947)

Rear Admiral Brian Perowne CB
- Born: 24 July 1947 (age 79)
- Military career
- Allegiance: United Kingdom
- Branch: Royal Navy
- Rank: Rear Admiral
- Awards: Companion of the Order of the Bath

Rear Admiral Benjamin Brian Perowne CB (born 24 July 1947) is a former Royal Navy officer who ended his naval career as Chief of Fleet Support.

== Early life ==
The son of Rear-Admiral Benjamin Cubitt Perowne CB, by his marriage to Phyllis Marjorie Peel, Perowne was educated at Gresham's School, Holt, and at the Britannia Royal Naval College, Dartmouth.

== Naval career ==
Perowne joined the Royal Navy in 1965 and passed the RN Staff College in 1977. He served in HM Yacht Britannia from 1980–82 and commanded HMS Alacrity in 1982–1983, before an appointment to the British Naval Staff in Washington D. C., 1986–88. His second command, in 1988–1989, was HMS Brazen, and after that he served as Assistant Director (Strategic Systems), then as Chief Naval Signals Officer at the Ministry of Defence. He was Commodore to the Clyde and Naval Base Commander, 1994 to 1996, Director General of Fleet Support (Ops and Plans) from 1996, Chief Executive at the Naval Bases and Supply Agency in 1999 a post he simoultensouly held until 2003. and Chief of Fleet Support in April 2000. In October 2000 he was involved with the Navy's efforts to deal with oil that had been leaking for several years from HMS Royal Oak in Scapa Flow. In 2004 he was appointed Deputy Chief Executive of Warship Support Agency until 2005 when he retired.

== Life after the Navy ==
In retirement Perowne became Chief Executive of Hft (formerly The Home Farm Trust), a charity for people with learning disabilities, and Treasurer of The Voluntary Organisation Disability Group. In April 2013 he was appointed a Non-Executive Director of the Taunton and Somerset NHS Foundation Trust.

== Family ==
He married Honora Rose Mary Wykes-Sneyd (known as Maggie), and they have two sons.

Military offices
Preceded by Sir John Dunt	Chief of Fleet Support; April 2000-December 2000	Succeeded by Jonathon Reeve
