= Peter White (Royal Navy officer) =

Royal Navy Admiral (1919–2010)

Admiral Sir Peter White GBE
- Born: 25 January 1919
- Died: 22 May 2010 (aged 91)
- Military career
- Allegiance: United Kingdom
- Branch: Royal Navy
- Service years: 1937–1977
- Rank: Admiral
- Conflicts: World War II
- Awards: Knight Grand Cross of the Order of the British Empire

Admiral Sir Peter White, GBE (25 January 1919 – 22 May 2010) was a Royal Navy supply officer who ended his career as Chief of Fleet Support.

== Naval career ==
Educated at Dover College, White joined the Royal Navy as a cadet in 1937 and was then deployed to the China Station. He served in World War II seeing action off Norway and at the Dunkirk evacuation. He was mentioned in despatches for his role in maintaining the operations plot during the Battle of North Cape in 1943 and became the link person between the Commander-in-Chief, Home Fleet and the signals intelligence centre at Bletchley Park. Later in the War he served in the Far East and was present at the Japanese surrender ceremony in September 1945.

After the War he served as Secretary to Admiral Sir Michael Denny and in 1967 he became Principal staff officer to the Chief of the Defence Staff. Promoted to rear admiral, he was appointed Director-General of Fleet Services in 1969 and Port Admiral at Rosyth in 1972 and, following his promotion to vice admiral, he went on to be Chief of Fleet Support in 1974. He was promoted to full Admiral on 28 June 1976, and retired in July 1977.

In retirement he became an associate director at the Industrial Society.

He was appointed a Knight Grand Cross of the Order of the British Empire in 1977.

== Family ==
In 1947 he married Audrey Wallin; they had two sons. Following the death of his first wife, he married Joan Davenport in 2007.

Military offices
Preceded by Sir Allan Trewby	Chief of Fleet Support; 1974–1977	Succeeded by Sir James Eberle
