= William A. Jenkins =

US Coast Guard rear admiral (1917–2022)

William Ambrose Jenkins
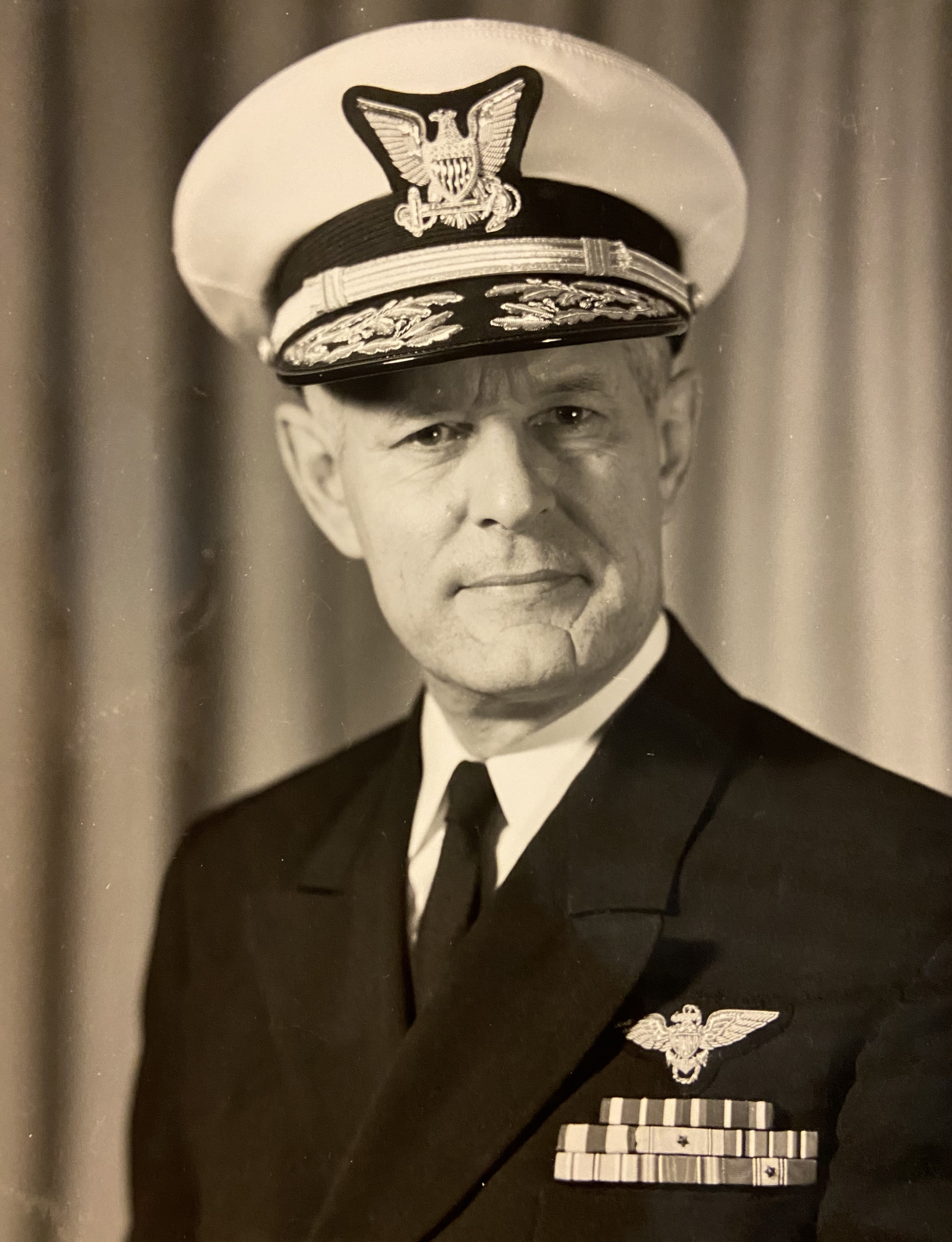
- Nickname: Bill
- Born: November 2, 1917; Kansas City, Missouri, U.S.
- Died: August 27, 2022 (aged 104) Port St. Lucie, Florida, U.S.
- Allegiance: United States
- Branch: United States Coast Guard
- Service years: 1941–1977
- Rank: Rear admiral
- Commands: Superintendent of the United States Coast Guard Academy
- Awards: Legion of Merit; Coast Guard Commendation Medal with gold star

William Ambrose Jenkins (November 2, 1917 – August 27, 2022) was a United States Coast Guard admiral who served as the Superintendent of the United States Coast Guard Academy from June 1974 to June 1977.

== Early life and education ==
Jenkins was born in Kansas City, Missouri, on November 2, 1917. He graduated from the United States Coast Guard Academy on December 19, 1941, 12 days after Pearl Harbor. After graduating from flight training in 1944, he flew 23 different types of aircraft and helicopters during his career in the Coast Guard.

Jenkins graduated from the National War College in Washington, D.C., in 1965.

== Military career ==
Jenkins was Chief of the Law Enforcement Division and Program Manager at USCG Headquarters, earning Coast Guard Commendation Medals for his interagency and international work in pollution control.

Jenkins was promoted to two star Rear admiral in 1970 and appointed to command of the Great Lakes Region before finally serving as the Superintendent of the United States Coast Guard Academy from June 1974 to June 1977.

== Personal life and death ==
Jenkins turned 100 in November 2017, and died from COVID-19 related pneumonia in Port St. Lucie, Florida, on August 27, 2022, at the age of 104.
