= Michael Villiers =

Royal Navy Vice Admiral (1907–1990)

Vice-Admiral Sir Michael Villiers KCB OBE

Lieutenant Governor of Jersey
- In office 1964–1969
- Preceded by: Sir George Erskine
- Succeeded by: Sir John Davis

Personal details
- Born: 22 June 1907 Greenwich, London
- Died: 1 January 1990 (aged 82) Melton, Suffolk
- Spouse: Rosemary Salwey Grissell (after 1936)
- Relations: Sir William Haynes-Smith (grandfather)
- Children: 2
- Parent(s): Edward Cecil Villiers; Anne Gordon Haynes-Smith
- Education: Oundle School
- Alma mater: Royal Naval College, Dartmouth

Military service
- Allegiance: United Kingdom
- Branch/service: Royal Navy
- Years of service: 1935–64
- Rank: Vice-Admiral
- Commands: Chief of the New Zealand Naval Staff (1958–60); HMS Bulwark (1954–57); HMS Snipe (1946–47); HMS Ursa (1945)
- Battles/wars: Second World War
- Awards: Mentioned in Despatches

Vice-Admiral Sir John Michael Villiers, KCB, OBE (22 June 1907 – 1 January 1990) was a Royal Navy officer who went on to be Fourth Sea Lord.

== Early life ==
Villiers was the third son of Rear Admiral Edward Cecil Villiers CMG (grandson of Thomas Hyde Villiers), and Anne Gordon Haynes-Smith, daughter of Sir William Frederick Haynes Smith, governor of Cyprus.

He was and educated at Oundle School and the Royal Naval College, Dartmouth.

== Naval career ==
Villiers joined the Royal Navy in 1935. and then went onto the staff of the Experimental Signal School at Portsmouth in 1936.

He served in the Second World War as Squadron Signal Officer and Flag Lieutenant to the Admiral commanding the Battle Cruiser Squadron and then transferred to the battleship HMS Warspite in which he took part in the Norwegian campaign. He joined the staff of Admiral Sir Bertram Ramsay for the planning of the invasion of Sicily in 1943 and then commanded the destroyer HMS Ursa in 1945.

After the war he commanded HMS Snipe on the West Indies Station from 1946 and then joined the Directing Staff at the Joint Services Staff College from 1948. He was appointed Assistant Director of Plans at the Admiralty in 1950 and Queen's Harbourmaster at Malta in 1952. He commanded the aircraft carrier HMS Bulwark from 1954 and then became Chief of the Naval Staff for the Royal New Zealand Navy in 1958. His last appointment was as Fourth Sea Lord and Vice Controller of the Navy in 1960 before he retired in 1964.

=== Later life ===
After retiring from the Navy, he succeeded Sir George Erskine to become Lieutenant Governor of Jersey. He served three years until he was succeeded by Sir John Davis in 1969.

== Personal life ==
On 3 November 1936, Sir Michael married Rosemary Salwey Grissell, daughter of Lt.-Col. Bernard Salwey Grissell, who was killed in Palestine in the First World War, and the former Olive Mary Wood. Rosemary's sister, Veronica, a historian, was the wife of Lt-Col W. H. "Tich" Bamfield. Together, they had two daughters:

- Valerie Anne Villiers (b. 1940), who married Vice Admiral Sir John Morrison Webster.
- Camilla Rosemary Villiers (b. 1943), who married Richard Weston Warner, son of John Weston Warner.

Sir Michael died on 1 January 1990 in Melton, Suffolk.

Military offices
Preceded by Sir Nicholas Copeman	Fourth Sea Lord and Vice Controller of the Navy; 1960–1964	Succeeded by Sir Raymond Hawkins
Preceded by John McBeath	Chief of the New Zealand Naval Staff; 1958–1960	Succeeded by Peter Phipps
Government offices
Preceded by Sir George Erskine	Lieutenant Governor of Jersey; 1964–1969	Succeeded by Sir John Davis
