= Amjad Hussain =

Royal Navy Rear Admiral (born 1958)

Rear Admiral Amjad Hussain CB
- Born: 15 May 1958 (age 68); Rawalpindi, Pakistan
- Military career
- Allegiance: United Kingdom
- Branch: Royal Navy
- Service years: 1976–2012
- Rank: Rear Admiral
- Awards: Companion of the Order of the Bath

Rear Admiral Amjad Mazhar Hussain, CB (born 15 May 1958) is a senior retired Royal Navy officer. He was the highest-ranking member of the British Armed Forces from an ethnic minority.

== Background and personal life ==
Born in Pakistan, Hussain and his mother moved to the United Kingdom in 1962 when he was three years old, to join his father who was working as a railway signalman.

In 1983 Amjad married Wendy Downer; they have three children: Sam, Zara and Hannah.

== Career ==
Hussain joined the Royal Navy as a Weapons Engineering Officer in 1976, and was sponsored to study engineering science and business administration at Collingwood College, University of Durham, from 1976 to 1979. He was promoted to lieutenant on 1 September 1981 (seniority from 1 April). He was promoted to commander on 31 December 1992, and to captain on 31 December 1997.

Hussain served as Naval Base Commodore, Portsmouth, from mid-2002, where his accommodation was in Spithead House. In 2006 he was appointed Director General Logistics (Fleet) and promoted to the rank of rear admiral, and thereby became the highest ranking Muslim and the highest-ranking officer from an ethnic minority in the British Armed Forces. He was appointed Director-General Weapons in 2008, and Director (Precision Attack) and Controller of the Navy in March 2009.

Hussain is a prominent advocate of greater minority participation in the armed forces. However, he dislikes too much emphasis being placed on his religion. He was recognised in the Muslim Power 100 List as one of the most influential Muslims in the United Kingdom. He was appointed a Companion of the Order of the Bath in the 2011 New Year Honours.

== Awards and nominations ==
In January 2013, Hussain was awarded the Civil Servant of the Year award at the British Muslim Awards.

== See also ==
- List of British Pakistanis

Military offices
Preceded by Paul Boissier	Chief of Fleet Support; 2006–2007	Succeeded by Trevor Soar (as Chief of Materiel, Fleet)
Preceded by Paul Lambert	Controller of the Navy; 2009–2012	Succeeded by Henry Parker
