= Raymond Hawkins =

Royal Navy officer

Vice-Admiral Sir Raymond Hawkins KCB
- Born: 21 December 1909
- Died: 18 October 1987 (aged 77)
- Military career
- Allegiance: United Kingdom
- Branch: Royal Navy
- Rank: Vice-Admiral
- Conflicts: World War II
- Awards: Knight Commander of the Order of the Bath

Vice-Admiral Sir Raymond Shayle Hawkins KCB (21 December 1909 – 18 October 1987) was a Royal Navy officer who went on to be Fourth Sea Lord.

== Naval career ==
Born on 21 December 1909 and educated at Bedford School, Raymond Hawkins joined the Royal Navy in 1927, serving aboard HMS Iron Duke in 1932 and aboard HMS Resolution in 1933. He served with Submarines between 1935 and 1943, and was promoted to lieutenant commander in 1940. He served aboard HMS Orion in 1943, as assistant naval attaché in Paris in 1954, and as commanding officer of HMS St Vincent in 1957. He was appointed director of marine engineering in 1961 and Fourth Sea Lord and Vice Controller of the Navy in 1963. Promoted to vice admiral, his job title changed to Chief of Naval Supplies and Transport and Vice-Controller of the Navy in 1964. He retired in 1967.

In retirement, Sir Raymond Hawkins was appointed director of engineering for English Electric Diesels. He died on 18 October 1987.

Military offices
Preceded by Sir Michael Villiers	Fourth Sea Lord and Vice Controller of the Navy; 1963–1964	Succeeded by Post Disbanded
Preceded by New Post	Chief of Fleet Support; 1964–1967	Succeeded by Sir Francis Turner
