= Christopher Gardner (Royal Navy officer) =

Royal Navy Vice-Admiral (born 1962)

Vice Admiral Sir Christopher Gardner KBE
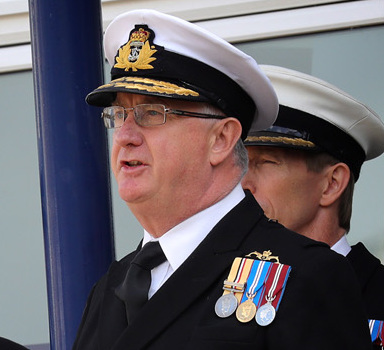
- Rear Admiral Gardner in 2016
- Born: 10 October 1962 (age 64); Hong Kong
- Military career
- Allegiance: United Kingdom
- Branch: Royal Navy
- Service years: 1984–present
- Rank: Vice Admiral
- Conflicts: Iraq War
- Awards: Knight Commander of the Order of the British Empire

Vice Admiral Sir Christopher Reginald Summers Gardner, KBE (born 10 October 1962) is a senior Royal Navy officer. Since 2022, he has been CEO of the Submarine Delivery Agency.

== Naval career ==
Gardner joined the Royal Navy as a logistics officer in 1984. He went on to serve on submarines and ships including HMS Tireless, HMS Sirius, and HMS Endurance.

Gardner became Head of Capability Improvement at the Ministry of Defence in 2010, Assistant Chief of Staff (Ships) in 2014 and Assistant Chief of the Naval Staff (Ships) in 2015. He was promoted to the rank of vice admiral and become Chief of Materiel (Ships) at Defence Equipment and Support in April 2019. Gardner's appointment has re-titled as 'Director General Ships'. In September 2022, he was appointed CEO of the Submarine Delivery Agency.

Having been appointed Commander of the Order of the British Empire (CBE) in the 2017 New Year Honours, Gardner was promoted to Knight Commander of the Order of the British Empire (KBE) in the 2022 New Year Honours.

== Family ==
In 1993, Gardner married Teresa Heather Edgecombe; they have one son and one daughter.
