= Commander United Kingdom Strike Force =

Senior post in the Royal Navy

- Official Badge of COMUKSTRKFOR
- Incumbent; Rear Admiral Mark Anderson since 2025
- Ministry of Defence; Royal Navy
- Member of: Navy Command
- Reports to: Fleet Commander
- Appointer: Naval Secretary; Subject to formal approval by the King-in-Council
- Term length: Not fixed; typically, 2–3 years
- Inaugural holder: Rear-Admiral James Burnell-Nugent
- Formation: 2001
- Website: www.royalnavy.mod.uk

The Commander United Kingdom Strike Force (COMUKSTRKFOR or CSF) is a senior post in the Royal Navy.

The post is the highest seagoing command in the Royal Navy. Its role is to direct UK, Allied or Coalition maritime forces anywhere in the world. Personnel within the command are always at short notice to deploy either at sea or on land, providing forces necessary for the task in hand. The Commander United Kingdom Strike Force may also be in command at sea of UK or NATO naval task forces and task groups formed for specific operations.

Previously the admiral also held the appointment of Rear Admiral Surface Ships, but this has now been dropped.

== Organisation within the Royal Navy ==
The position reports to the Fleet Commander, a vice-admiral, and is based at HMS Excellent in Fieldhouse Building. Commander UK Strike Force has the rank of rear admiral.

COMUKSTRKFOR directs the two Very High Readiness Strike Groups in the Royal Navy: Commander Littoral Strike Group (COMLSG), formerly Commander Amphibious Task Group, (COMATG), and Commander United Kingdom Carrier Strike Group (COMUKCSG). He also has responsibility for the Commander UK Minecountermeasures Force, Previously until at least 2019 the admiral also had the post of Rear Admiral Surface Ships, the titular head of all the Royal Navy surface ships.

As part of the NATO Long Term Commitments Plot of Command responsibilities across the Alliance, COMUKSTRKFOR is one of six national/NATO deployable HQs accredited to act as the High Readiness Force (Maritime) and as such has held the duty of NATO Response Force Maritime Component Commander on several occasions, including 2004, 2010, and 2016.

== History ==
The position was first established on 1 December 1997, under the name of Commander United Kingdom Task Group (COMUKTG), but was renamed to Commander UK Maritime Forces (COMUKMARFOR) in 2001. The previous UK carrier commander was Flag Officer, Third Flotilla.

Task Groups dispatched to the Far East since 2003 have included deployments in 2003, 2004, 2005, 2009, and 2018. In 2003, Naval Task Group 03, led by HMS Ark Royal (R07) had been intended to take part in FPDA exercises in the Asia-Pacific region but was diverted for involvement in the 2003 Iraq War. Eventually part of the naval task group including Liverpool, Marlborough and RFA Grey Rover departed Gulf waters, after the first part of the Iraq War (2003), en route for Exercise Flying Fish, with Commonwealth partner members of the Five Power Defence Arrangements. In 2004, Exeter, Echo, RFA Diligence and RFA Grey Rover visited the Asia-Pacific region.

COMUKMARFOR took on the duty of NATO Response Force Maritime Component Commander from 1 July 2004 for one year. Rear Admiral David Snelson told Jane's Defence Weekly correspondent Richard Scott in May 2004 that in the lead up to assumption of duties as NATO Response Force Maritime Component Commander, there was to be a major exercise, Allied Action, in Italy. Allied Action was a command post exercise in which all three of the component commanders for NRF were to be located ashore so that the staffs could work together and the commanders could get to know one another.

The Naval Task Group for Operation VELA, a three-month deployment to West Africa in 2006, was under the command of Commander UK Amphibious Group, Commodore Phil Jones. The VELA deployment involved a significant number of Royal Navy and Royal Fleet Auxiliary ships, the Royal Marine Commandos and helicopters. The Task Group included HMS Albion, HMS Ocean, HMS Southampton, HMS Argyll, RFA Wave Knight, RFA Mounts Bay, RFA Sir Bedivere, RFA Fort Austin, HMS Enterprise, RFA Diligence, RFA Oakleaf, Mine Counter Measure Squadron 1 and a Fleet submarine together with the Fleet Lead Commando Group, consisting of 40 Commando Royal Marines, 59 Commando Independent Engineering Squadron, 29 Commando Royal Artillery and 539 Assault Squadron Royal Marines. Also involved were elements of Fleet Diving Unit 2 and 849 (B) Flight from RNAS Culdrose. Embarked in HMS Ocean for the deployment a Tailored Air Group (TAG) was formed, consisting of Sea King helicopters of 845 Naval Air Squadron, 846 Naval Air Squadron, Merlin Mk 1 aircraft from 820 Naval Air Squadron and Lynx helicopters of 847 Naval Air Squadron. The Vela task group conducted an amphibious exercise, Exercise Green Eagle, in Sierra Leone.

Commodore Thomas Cunningham, the previous COMUKCSG, flew his flag throughout the January to May Orion '08 deployment, as Commander Task Group 328.01, which included exercises with the Indian Navy, aboard HMS Illustrious.

Until 2011, COMUKMARFOR had three subordinates – the Commander Amphibious Task Group (COMATG), the Commander of the United Kingdom Carrier Strike Group (COMCSG) and his one-star deployable deputy, Commander United Kingdom Task Group (COMUKTG). However, following the 2010 Strategic Defence and Security Review, COMCSG and COMUKTG were abolished as separate commands (although the one-star post that was previously named COMUKTG was retained, albeit with no staff, to become Deputy Commander of COMUKMARFOR), and COMATG (remaining based in Plymouth) assumed the title of COMUKTG.

In March 2015, this reorganisation was partially reversed when the post of COMUKTG reverted to its previous title of COMATG.

In 2016, with the commissioning of the Queen Elizabeth-class carriers, the Deputy COMUKMARFOR position transitioned to the re-established role of COMUKCSG in preparation for the arrival of the new Queen Elizabeth-class aircraft carriers.

In April 2018 it was announced that the two separate deployable two-star maritime operational commanders (COMUKMARFOR and COMUKAMPHIBFOR) would be merged into a single, larger, organisation. This took place on 1 July 2019, whereupon the incumbent COMUKMARFOR took the title of COMUKSTRKFOR, and responsibility for all the deployable elements of COMUKAMPHIBFOR. The Role of Commandant General Royal Marines, previously (but not exclusively) tied to COMUKAMPHIBFOR position, remains in existence as the (non-deployable) head of the Royal Marines and the Senior Responsible Owner for the future of amphibious warfare and littoral strike capability, or Future Commando Force.

On 1 October 2019, COMATG was re-titled as Commander Littoral Strike Group (COMLSG).

== List of commanders ==
Commanders have been as follows:

- Rear Admiral Stephen Meyer (2000–2001)
- Rear Admiral James Burnell-Nugent (2001–2002)
- Rear Admiral David Snelson (2002–2004)
- Rear Admiral Charles Style (2004–2005)
- Rear Admiral Neil Morisetti (2005–2007)
- Rear Admiral George Zambellas (2007–2008)
- Rear Admiral Philip Jones (2008–2009)
- Rear Admiral Peter Hudson (2009–2011)
- Rear Admiral Duncan Potts (2011–2013)
- Rear Admiral Robert Tarrant (2013–2014)
- Rear Admiral Tony Radakin (2014–2016)
- Rear Admiral Alex Burton (2016–2017)
- Rear Admiral Paul Bennett (2017–2018)
- Rear Admiral Jeremy Kyd (2018–2019)
- Rear Admiral Andrew Burns (2019–2019)
- Rear Admiral Michael Utley, Commander UK Maritime Forces and Rear Admiral Surface Ships (2019–2022)
- Rear Admiral Robert Pedre (2022–2025)
- Rear Admiral Mark Anderson (2025–present)

== Deputy Commander United Kingdom Maritime Forces ==
- Commodore Simon Ancona (Jan 2011 – Jun 2011)
- Commodore John Clink (Jun 2011 – Oct 2012)
- Commodore Jeremy Blunden (Oct 2012 – Feb 2015)
- Commodore Guy Robinson (Feb 2015 – 2016)
