= Derek Reffell =

Royal Navy Admiral (1928–2025)

Admiral Sir Derek Reffell KCB
- Born: 6 October 1928
- Died: 23 May 2025 (aged 96)
- Military career
- Allegiance: United Kingdom
- Branch: Royal Navy
- Rank: Admiral
- Commands: Controller of the Navy; HMS Hermes; HMS Sirius
- Awards: Knight Commander of the Order of the Bath
- Other work: Governor of Gibraltar (1989–93)

Viceregal styles of Sir Derek Reffell (1989–1993)
- Reference style: His Excellency
- Spoken style: Your Excellency

Admiral Sir Derek Roy Reffell, KCB (6 October 1928 – 23 May 2025) was a Royal Navy officer and Governor of Gibraltar.

== Naval career ==
Educated at Culford School, Reffell entered the Royal Navy, qualified as a Navigating Officer in 1954 and progressed through the ranks: he commanded the frigate HMS Sirius from her launch in 1966, and served as captain of the commando carrier HMS Hermes from 1974 to 1976 and as Commodore, Amphibious Warfare, from 1978 to 1979. He was appointed Assistant Chief of the Naval Staff for Policy – ACNS(P) – in 1979. He was promoted to Vice-Admiral, becoming Flag Officer, Third Flotilla (FOF3) in 1982.

During the Falklands War Admiral Reffell was serving as Flag Officer Third Flotilla in charge of the amphibious ships and aircraft carriers. Alastair Finlan commented that Admiral Reffell was the obvious choice for in-theatre commander but was not selected. Commodore Michael Clapp later expressed his surprise at this decision, and, what was more, the fact that Reffell was barred access to the Northwood Headquarters so that his advice was not available.

After Hermes returned to the UK, and Rear Admiral Sandy Woodward had returned home, Invincible remained on station in the South Atlantic until September 1982. Reffell become senior officer in-theatre from 1 July 1982. To relieve Invincible, the newly completed Illustrious was rapidly deployed. So rapidly was Illustrious deployed that she was commissioned while at sea. Reffell commanded the task group from Illustrious during this period (aboard Bristol for a period too, reportedly). Aircraft embarked included 809 Naval Air Squadron (Sea Harrier) and 814 Naval Air Squadron (Sea King) embarked. Additionally, a pair of Sea Kings from 824 Naval Air Squadron were attached to the air group, which had been converted to operate in the airborne early warning role.

After the RAF airfield was repaired, Illustrious returned to the UK for a full shakedown cruise and workup period, and was formally commissioned on 20 March 1983.

Reffell became Controller of the Navy in 1984 and was Governor of Gibraltar from 1989 to 1993.

== Death ==
Reffell died on 23 May 2025, at the age of 96.

Military offices
Preceded by Sir Lindsay Bryson	Controller of the Navy; 1984–1989	Succeeded by Sir Kenneth Eaton
Government offices
Preceded by Sir Peter Terry	Governor of Gibraltar; 1989–1993	Succeeded by Sir John Chapple
