= Duncan Potts =

Royal Navy admiral (born 1961)

Vice Admiral Duncan Potts CB
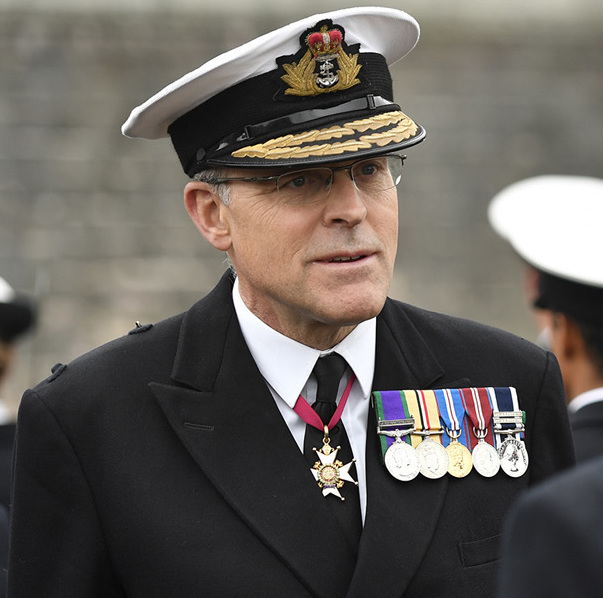
- Vice Admiral Potts in 2017
- Born: 10 March 1961 (age 65); Malta
- Military career
- Allegiance: United Kingdom
- Branch: Royal Navy
- Service years: 1979–2018
- Rank: Vice Admiral
- Commands: Defence Academy of the United Kingdom; Commander United Kingdom Maritime Forces; 4th Frigate Squadron; HMS Marlborough; HMS Southampton; HMS Brilliant
- Conflicts: Iraq War
- Awards: Companion of the Order of the Bath

Vice Admiral Duncan Laurence Potts, CB (born 10 March 1961) is a retired senior Royal Navy officer. He served as Assistant Chief of Naval Staff (Capability) and Controller of the Navy from 2013 to 2014, and as Director General of the Defence Academy of the United Kingdom from September 2014 to 2018.

== Early life ==
Potts was born on 10 March 1961 in Malta. He was educated at Wellington School in Somerset.

== Military career ==
Potts joined the Royal Navy in 1979. He became commanding officer of the frigate HMS Brilliant in 1996, commanding officer of the destroyer HMS Southampton in 1997 and a member of the policy and programmes cell at the Permanent Joint Headquarters in 1998 before becoming Commander Sea Training to the Flag Officer Sea Training in 1999. He was appointed commanding officer of the frigate HMS Marlborough as well as captain of the 4th Frigate Squadron in 2000 and deployed to the Middle East.

Potts went on to be Captain Navy Plans and then military assistant to the Vice-Chief of the Defence Staff at the Ministry of Defence. He was appointed commander of the Commander United Kingdom Task Group in 2007 (in which role he was deployed to the Gulf) and Assistant Chief of Staff (Crisis and Deliberate Planning) at Permanent Joint Headquarters in 2009. He became Commander United Kingdom Maritime Forces in January 2011 (deployed as commander of EU maritime operations off Somalia from August 2011) and Assistant Chief of Naval Staff (Capability) and Controller of the Navy in April 2013. Potts was appointed a Companion of the Order of the Bath in the 2014 Birthday Honours, and made director general of Joint Force Development and director general of the Defence Academy of the United Kingdom, with the rank of vice admiral, on 19 September that year.

Military offices
Preceded by Peter Hudson	Commander United Kingdom Maritime Forces; 2011–2013	Succeeded by Robert Tarrant
Preceded by Henry Parker	Controller of the Navy; 2013–2014	Succeeded by James Morse
Preceded by Peter Watkins	Director General of the Defence Academy; 2014–2018	Succeeded by Edward Stringer
