= Commander Littoral Strike Group =

Position in the British Navy

Commander Littoral Strike Group (COMLSG)
- Official badge of COMLSG
- Incumbent; Commodore Rob Pedre since May 2020
- Navy Command, Ministry of Defence
- Reports to: Commander United Kingdom Strike Force
- Appointer: Naval Secretary
- Term length: Not fixed (typically 2 years)
- Inaugural holder: Commodore Hardress Lloyd
- Formation: 1965–current

The Commander Littoral Strike Group (COMLSG) is a senior British Royal Navy Amphibious warfare appointment. COMLSG, who is based in Stonehouse Barracks, Stonehouse, Plymouth, reports to Commander United Kingdom Strike Force. It was first established in 1971 as Commodore Amphibious Warfare.

COMLSG is a deployable one-star Maritime Component Commander held at "Very High Readiness" (72 hours or less) to respond to global events. In most circumstances, COMLSG and his staff would deploy in the Fleet Flagship (such as one of the new Queen Elizabeth-class aircraft carriers) to command a deployed task group. While structured and trained for high-intensity war-fighting (with an emphasis on amphibious operations, working alongside 3 Commando Brigade), the staff are capable of commanding a diverse range of activities such as evacuation operations or disaster relief.

Nevertheless, as of late 2024, the future of U.K amphibious capability was, at best, uncertain. In November 2024, the newly elected Labour government indicated that both of the Royal Navy's Albion-class landing platform dock vessels would be removed from service by March 2025. Simultaneously, the Royal Fleet Auxiliary was suffering severe crewing problems, as well as a labour force disruption, meaning the manning of its three Bay-class landing ship dock vessels was facing serious challenges. This brought into question the entire concept of the navy's ability to conduct even medium-sized amphibious operations.

== History ==
In the 1960s most of the Navy's amphibious capability was under Commodore, Amphibious Forces, Far East Fleet (COMAFFEF), based at Singapore Naval Base. In March 1971, following the withdrawal from Singapore, and the return of 3 Commando Brigade to the UK, COMAFFEF was retitled Commodore Amphibious Warfare (COMAW), and moved to Fort Southwick, just outside Portsmouth. COMAW became subordinate to Flag Officer, Carriers and Amphibious Ships (FOCAF).

After 1979 when FOCAF became Flag Officer, Third Flotilla, COMAW became part of Third Flotilla. In 1981, Commodore Michael Clapp moved COMAW to Stonehouse Barracks in order to be based alongside HQ 3 Commando Brigade again. Following the pivotal role of the Royal Navy's amphibious forces during the Falklands War, when Clapp directed the Amphibious Group of the British task force, alongside Brigadier Julian Thompson, this co-location of the two Headquarters has endured ever since.

From 1992 COMAW reported to the two-star deployable battle staff commander, currently titled Commander UK Strike Force. The reestablishment of the Amphibious Warfare Warfare Squadron was announced in March 1997. But the commander's title was renamed from COMAW to Commander Amphibious Task Group (COMATG) on 1 December 1997; subsequent references to a 'squadron' are hard to find.

In the early 21st century COMATG deployments included Operation Veritas in 2001; Operation Telic, the 2003 invasion of Iraq; Operation Vela in 2006; Operation Highbrow, evacuating personnel from Lebanon in 2006; leading Combined Task Force 152 in the Middle East in 2008; and Operation Taurus in 2009.

Until 2011, COMATG was one of the deployable maritime commanders who with their headquarters reported to the Fleet Battle Staff, alongside two others, the Commander United Kingdom Carrier Strike Group (COMCSG) and the Commander UK Task Group (COMUKTG). However, following the Strategic Defence and Security Review 2010, COMCSG and COMUKTG were abolished as separate commands and COMATG became the sole deployable HQ, under the new title of COMUKTG, responsible for command of the Response Force Task Group. At this point, the former Commander UK Task Group became Deputy Commander United Kingdom Maritime Forces.

In early October 2012, the Commander UK Task Group, Commodore Paddy McAlpine led the Cougar 12 deployment of six ships and more than 3,000 marines and sailors to the Mediterranean Sea. One of the principle purposes of the deployment was to conduct large-scale amphibious exercises with allies. Key exercises included: 'Corsican Lion' with France; 'Albanian Lion' with Albania; a visit to Malta and exercises with the United States Navy and the Algerian Armed Forces.

McAlpine said: "Cougar 12 provides us with a superb opportunity to rekindle our amphibious capability after a prolonged period when our focus has been ..elsewhere." Exercise 'Corsican Lion' was the main focus of Cougar 12 and was designed to develop the maritime and amphibious components of the Anglo-French Combined Joint Expeditionary Force. The group worked alongside the French Navy's Task Force 473 led by French aircraft carrier Charles de Gaulle.

Brigadier Martin Smith of 3 Commando Brigade was quoted saying: "It is an incredibly versatile force and our burgeoning interoperability with the French further proves this. The quality of Royal Marines Commandos and French Marines delivers a highly effective first response capability ..optimised for early entry operations."

In March 2015, the post of COMUKTG reverted to its previous title of COMATG. COMATG was responsible to Commander United Kingdom Maritime Forces.

COMATG was re-titled Commander Littoral Strike Group on 1 October 2019, to reflect the expected increased size and capabilities of the group, including Queen Elizabeth-class aircraft carriers.

== Deployments and operations ==
- COUGAR 11
- Op ELLAMY 11
- COUGAR 12
- Op PATWIN 13
- COUGAR 13
- COUGAR 14
- COUGAR 15
- Op WEALD 15
- JEF(M) 16
- CTF50 17
- Amphibious Task Group 18
- SAIF SAREEA 3 18
- BALTIC PROTECTOR 19
- Op SENTINEL 20 (International Maritime Security Construct)
- Littoral Response Group (Experimentation) Deployment 20

== In command ==
Included:

=== Commodore, Amphibious Warfare ===
- Commodore Hardress L. Lloyd: May 1965-May 1966
- Commodore David Dunbar-Naismith DSC: May 1966-July 1967
- Commodore Gerard Mansfield: July 1967-November 1968
- Commodore Thomas W. Stocker: November 1968-September 1970
- Commodore Derek W. Napper DSC: September 1970-August 1971
- Commodore Roy W. Halliday DSC: August 1971-September 1973
- Commodore David T. Smith: September 1973-October 1975
- Commodore Richard D. Franklin: October 1975-February 1977
- Commodore Derek R. Reffell: June 1978-October 1979
- Commodore Christopher J. Isacke: October 1979-May 1981
- Commodore Michael Clapp CB: May 1981-February 1983
- Commodore Peter G. V. Dingemans DSO: February 1983-January 1985
- Commodore John Garnier CBE LVO: January–July 1985
- Commodore E.S. Jeremy Larken DSO: July 1985-December 1987
- Commodore Brian W. Turner: December 1987-April 1990
- Commodore Peter J. Grindal: April 1990-April 1992
- Commodore Richard A.Y. Bridges: April 1992- July 1994
- Commodore Paul B.C. Canter CBE: July 1994-October 1996
- Commodore Paul D. Stone: October 1996-1 December 1997

Note: COMAW was renamed COMATG in 1997

=== Commander, Amphibious Task Group ===
Commodores in post included:

- Commodore Paul D. Stone: 1 December 1997 – 1998
- Commodore Niall S.R. Kilgour: 1998-July 2001
- Commodore A. James G. Miller: July 2001-September 2003
- Commodore Christopher J. Parry: September 2003-January 2005
- Commodore George M. Zambellas: January 2005-August 2006
- Commodore Philip A. Jones: August 2006 – 2008
- Commodore Peter D. Hudson: 2008-May 2009
- Commodore Paul M. Bennett: May 2009-January 2011

Note: Following SDSR10, COMATG was renamed COMUKTG, and the Amphibious Task Group was renamed the Response Force Task Group.

=== Commander, U.K. Task Group ===
Commodores in post included:

- Commodore John M. L. Kingwell: January–November 2011
- Commodore Patrick A. McAlpine: November 2011-February 2014
- Commodore Jeremy P. Kyd: February 2014-February 2015
- Commodore Martin J. Connell: February 2015-March 2015

Note: COMUKTG post reverted to the name Commander Amphibious Task Group in March 2015, and Cdre Connell continued in that role till May 2016

=== Commander, Amphibious Task Group ===
Commodores in post included:

- Commodore Martin J. Connell: March 2015-May 2016
- Commodore Andrew P. Burns: May 2016-May 2018
- Commodore James M.B. Parkin: May 2018-October 2019

Note: COMATG was renamed Commander Littoral Strike Group in October 2019, and Cdre Parkin continued in post under the new title.

=== Commander, Littoral Strike Group ===
- Commodore James M.B. Parkin: October 2019 – May 2020
- Commodore Robert G. Pedre: May 2020 – July 2022
- Major-General Paul Maynard: July 2022 – July 2023
