= Robert Pedre =

UK Royal Navy officer

Vice Admiral Robert Pedre CB
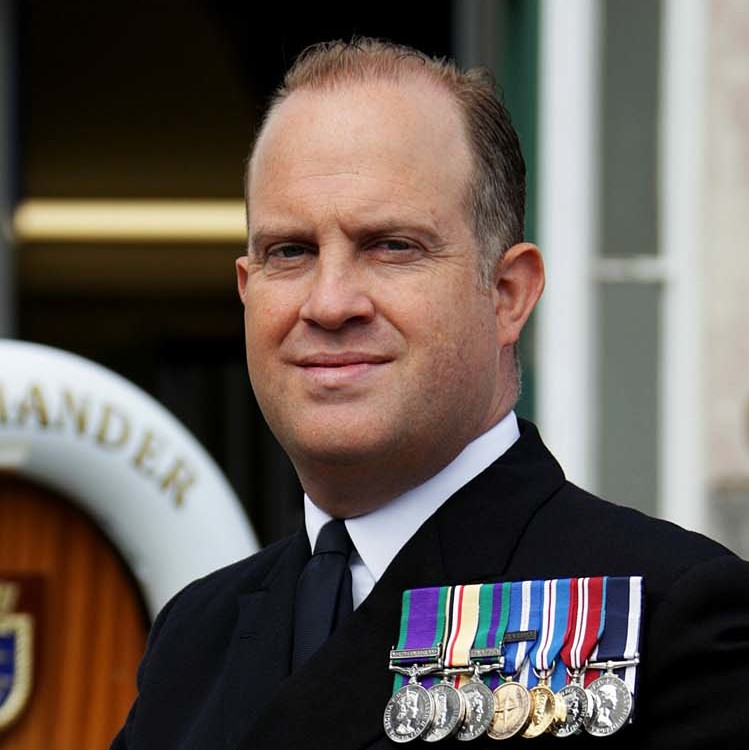
- Robert Pedre
- Born: Taunton, Somerset
- Military career
- Allegiance: United Kingdom
- Branch: Royal Navy
- Service years: 1996–present
- Rank: Vice Admiral
- Commands: HMS Cottesmore; HMS Richmond; HMS Ocean; Commander Littoral Strike Group; Commander United Kingdom Strike Force
- Awards: Companion of the Order of the Bath

Vice Admiral Robert George Pedre CB (born 8 February 1975) is a senior Royal Navy officer and current Commander, Allied Maritime Command.

== Education ==
He was born 8 February 1975 in Taunton, Somerset. Pedre was educated at Davenant Foundation School, Imperial College London (BSc physics, 1996) and King's College London (MA Defence Studies, 2016),

== Naval career ==
Pedre entered Britannia Royal Naval College on 18 September 1996. He saw initial service in several destroyers operating in the South Atlantic and Pacific Oceans. He became commanding officer of the Hunt-class mine countermeasures vessel HMS Cottesmore, deployed on counter-terrorist operations in the Irish Sea, in 2003. Pedre then served as Operations Officer on HMS Northumberland and organised NATO’s first counter-piracy deployment to the Red Sea and Gulf of Aden in 2007.

He then became executive officer on the Type 22 frigate HMS Cumberland, where he was involved in the evacuation of personnel from Benghazi, Libya in 2009. He went on to command the Type 23 frigate HMS Richmond in 2012, and the landing platform helicopter HMS Ocean in 2016. Ocean served as flagship for Standing NATO Maritime Group 2 and took part in Operation RUMAN (humanitarian support to the British Overseas Territories), before being decommissioned in the presence of Queen Elizabeth II on 27 March 2018.

Pedre went on to be Assistant Head Defence Strategy at the Ministry of Defence later in 2018. In May 2020 he was appointed Commander Littoral Strike Group.

=== Rear-admiral ===
In 2022 he was promoted to rear admiral and appointed as Commander United Kingdom Strike Force in September 2022. In August 2024, with his staff, he participated in a joint United States Fleet Synthetic training period. This was the first time the Royal Navy’s Commander Strike Force had participated in the certification that all US Navy Strike Groups complete. In October 2024 he gave the keynote speech at the Geostrategy Forum of the Council on Geostrategy on the subject of the changing character of naval warfare. Promoted to vice admiral, he became Commander, Allied Maritime Command, in January 2026.

Pedre was appointed a Companion of the Order of the Bath in the 2025 Birthday Honours.

Military offices
Preceded by Mike Utley	Commander United Kingdom Strike Force; 2022–2025	Succeeded by Mark Anderson
Preceded by Mike Utley	Commander Allied Maritime Command; 2026–present	Incumbent
