= Frank Burnell-Nugent =

English cricketer and British Army officer

Brigadier-General Frank Burnell-Nugent CB DSO OBE
- Born: Frank Henry Nugent; 5 September 1880; Sherborne St John, Hampshire, England
- Died: 12 March 1942 (aged 61); Kingsclere, Hampshire, England
- Burial place: St Mary's Church, Kingsclere; 51.3246°N 1.2477°W
- Spouse: Ellen Burnell (m. 1905–1941: her death)
- Relatives: Admiral Sir James Burnell-Nugent (grandson)
- Military career
- Allegiance: United Kingdom
- Branch: British Army; British Indian Army
- Service years: 1899–1933
- Rank: Brigadier-General
- Units: Rifle Brigade; 15th Punjab Regiment
- Commands: British concession of Tianjin; 182nd Infantry Brigade; 55th Infantry Brigade; 167th Brigade; 2nd Battalion, Rifle Brigade
- Conflicts: Second Boer War; First World War; Battle of Mons; Iraq Rebellion
- Awards: Companion of the Order of the Bath; Distinguished Service Order; Officer of the Order of the British Empire
- Cricket career

Cricket information
- Batting: Right-handed
- Role: Wicket-keeper

Domestic team information
- Years: Team
- 1904: Hampshire

Career statistics
Competition	First-class
Matches	1
Runs scored	0
Batting average	0.00
100s/50s	–/–
Top score	0
Catches/stumpings	1/–
- Source: Frank Burnell-Nugent at Cricinfo

Brigadier-General Frank Henry Burnell-Nugent, CB, DSO, OBE (born Nugent; 5 September 1880 – 12 March 1942) was a British Army officer and an English first-class cricketer. Burnell-Nugent had a distinguished career in the army, serving with the Rifle Brigade between 1899 and 1933 and seeing action in the Second Boer War and the First World War. As a cricketer, he made one appearance in first-class cricket for Hampshire.

== Early life and military service ==
Frank Nugent was the son of Albert Llewellyn Nugent, 3rd Baron Nugent (of Austria), and his wife, Elizabeth Baltazzi, he was born at The Vyne estate near Basingstoke in September 1880. He was educated firstly at the Horris Hill School preparatory school, before attending Winchester College. From Winchester, he went up to the Royal Military College at Sandhurst. He graduated from there into the Rifle Brigade as a second lieutenant in November 1899. In March 1901, was seconded to serve with the Mounted Infantry in the Second Boer War in South Africa. Nugent was seriously wounded during the war, but was decorated for his participation with the Queen's South Africa Medal with four clasps. Shortly after the conclusion of the war, he received a regular commission as a lieutenant in the 3rd Battalion of his regiment in August 1902.

Nugent made a single appearance in first-class cricket as a wicket-keeper for Hampshire against Worcestershire at Worcester in the 1905 County Championship. Batting twice in the match, he was dismissed without scoring by Ted Arnold in Hampshire's first innings, while in their second innings he was dismissed for the same score by George Wilson. He married Ellen Burnell in 1905, and would later change his surname to Burnell-Nugent in the second-half of 1916. In the army, he was promoted to captain in March 1905. In April 1910, he was seconded to serve as an adjutant with the Leeds and University of Manchester contingents of the Officers' Training Corps.

== First World War and later service ==
Nugent fought in the First World War, during which he was wounded during the British retreat from Mons in August 1914. He was made a temporary major in the second year of the war, with him gaining the full rank three months later in September 1915. In January 1916, he was made a Companion of the Distinguished Service Order, while the following month he was attached to headquarters as a brigade commander which saw him made a temporary brigadier-general whilst so employed. In June 1916, Nugent was made a brevet lieutenant colonel in recognition of distinguished service in the field. During the war, he commanded the 2nd Battalion, the 167th, and the 55th and 182nd Infantry Brigades. Following the end of the war, Burnell-Nugent was appointed an Officer of the Order of the British Empire in 1919 Birthday Honours. The following year, he saw action in the Iraq Rebellion.

Between April 1925 and November 1926, Burnell-Nugent was attached to the British Indian Army as an instructor at the Senior Officers' School in Belgaum, prior to his appointment to the 15th Punjab Regiment in December 1926. In the Rifle Brigade, he was made a lieutenant colonel in June 1927, In July 1930, he was promoted to colonel and was placed in command of the British concession of Tianjin in Northern China, and whilst holding that command he was given the temporary rank of brigadier. He was appointed a Companion of the Order of the Bath in the 1933 Birthday Honours. He relinquished his command in Tianjin upon his retirement in September 1933, at which point he was granted the honorary rank of brigadier-general; his time in command was described by The Times as a "difficult period". Nugent died at Kingsclere, Hampshire, on 12 March 1942; he was buried at Kingsclere four days later. His wife, with whom he had a son, predeceased him by one year. His grandson is the retired Royal Navy Admiral Sir James Burnell-Nugent.
