= Philip Jones (Royal Navy officer) =

Royal Navy Admiral (born 1960)

Admiral Sir Philip Jones GCB DL
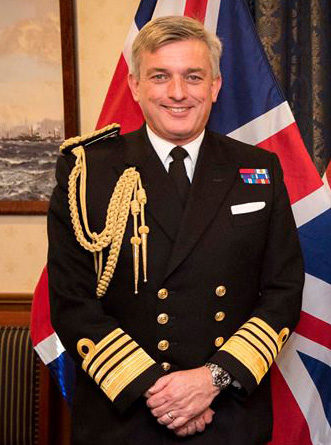
- Born: 14 February 1960 (age 66); Bebington, Wirral
- Military career
- Allegiance: United Kingdom
- Branch: Royal Navy
- Service years: 1980–2020
- Rank: Admiral
- Commands: First Sea Lord; Scotland, Northern England and Northern Ireland; Amphibious Task Group; HMS Coventry; HMS Beaver
- Conflicts: Falklands War
- Awards: Knight Grand Cross of the Order of the Bath; Commander of the Legion of Merit (United States)

Admiral Sir Philip Andrew Jones, GCB, DL (born 14 February 1960) is a retired senior Royal Navy officer. After service in the South Atlantic in 1982 during the Falklands War, he commanded the frigates HMS Beaver and HMS Coventry. He went on to be Flag Officer, Scotland, Northern England and Northern Ireland, Commander United Kingdom Maritime Forces and Assistant Chief of the Naval Staff before being appointed Fleet Commander and Deputy Chief of the Naval Staff. Jones served as First Sea Lord from April 2016 to June 2019.

== Early life and education ==
Jones was born on 14 February 1960. He is the son of Edgar Jones and Lilian Jones (née Peters). He was educated at Birkenhead School, Mansfield College, Oxford and the Royal Naval College, Dartmouth.

== Naval career ==
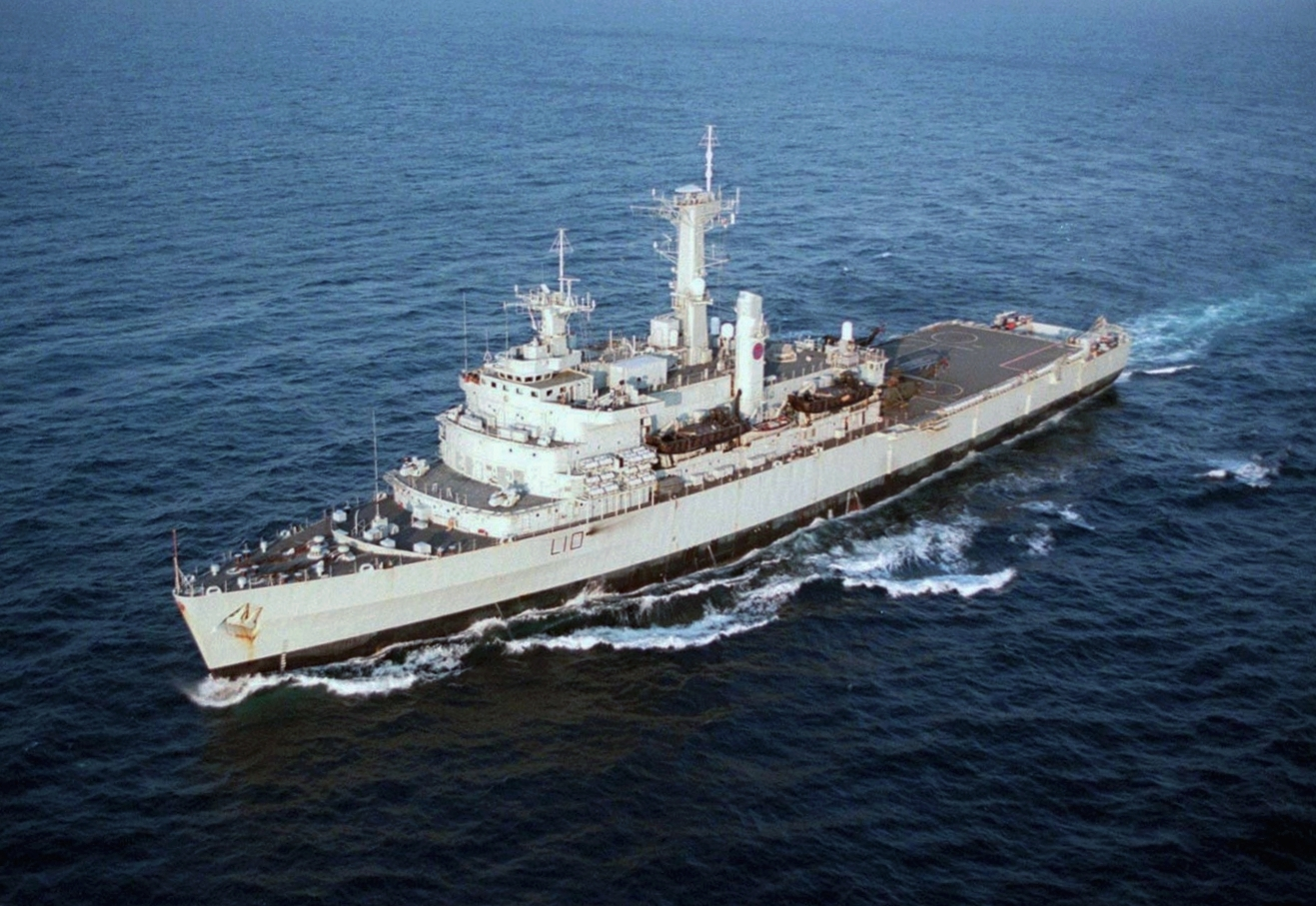
HMS Fearless, on which Jones saw active service during the Falklands War

Jones joined the Royal Navy as a sub-lieutenant on 1 May 1980. He saw active service in the South Atlantic in the amphibious assault ship HMS Fearless in 1982 during the Falklands War and was promoted to lieutenant on 1 September 1982. He served as a watch keeping and navigation officer in various frigates and in the Royal Yacht Britannia from 1983 until 1988 from when he served as principal warfare officer in various frigates and with the maritime battle staff. Promoted to commander on 1 February 1994, he was made commanding officer of the frigate HMS Beaver in 1994 and a member of the Directorate of Navy Plans in the Ministry of Defence in 1997.

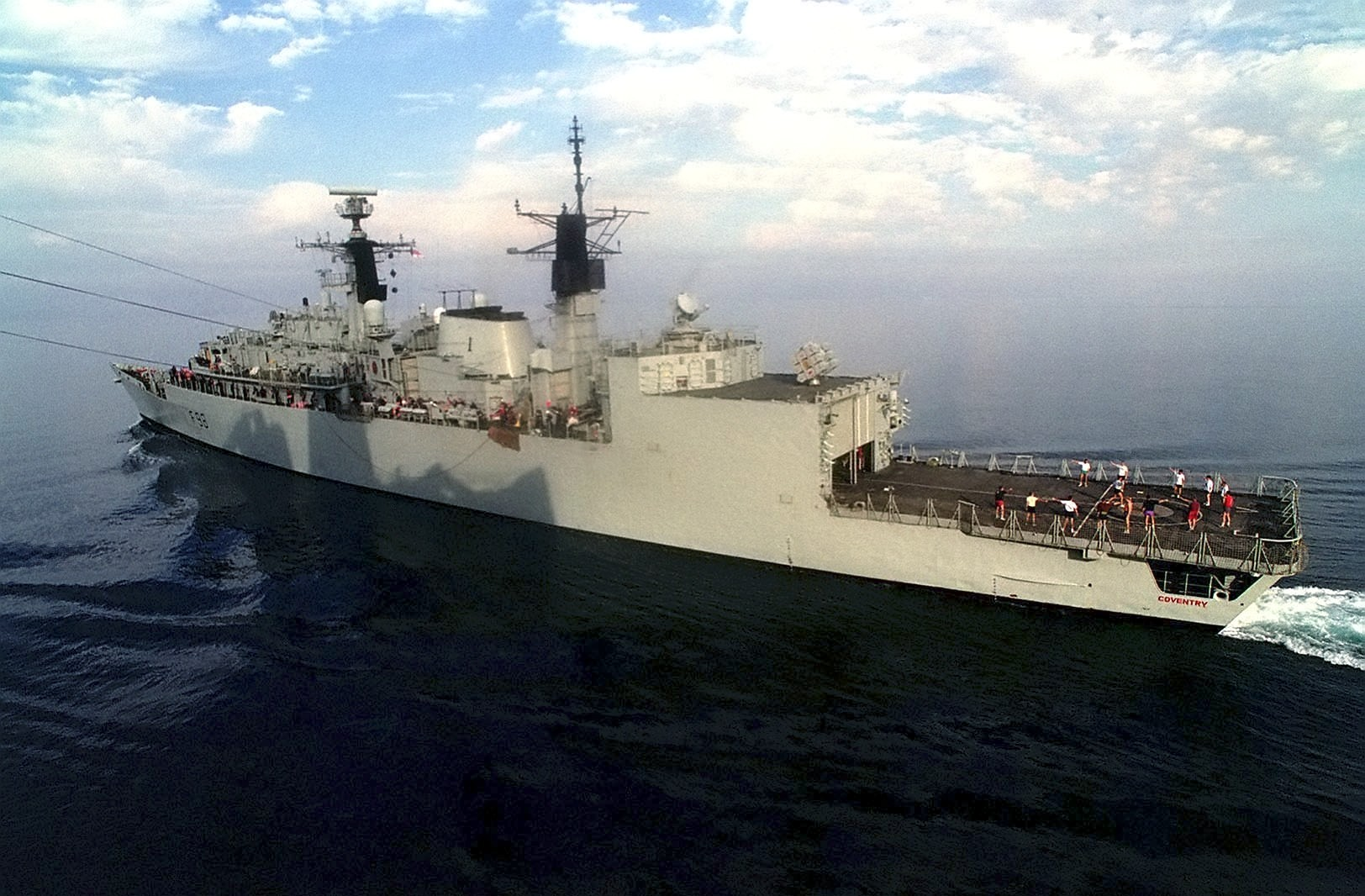
HMS Coventry, which Jones commanded

Promoted to captain on 31 December 1999, Jones became commanding officer of the frigate HMS Coventry as well as Captain of the 1st Frigate Squadron that same month. He went on to be Military Assistant to the Chief of Defence Logistics in 2002, Director of the Joint Maritime Operational Training Staff in 2003 and Assistant Chief of Staff to the Commander-in-Chief Fleet in 2004. Promoted to commodore on 13 December 2004, he became Commander Amphibious Task Group in August 2006. Appointed an Aide-de-camp (ADC) to the Queen on 1 August 2006, he was promoted to rear admiral on 14 February 2008 and made Flag Officer, Scotland, Northern England and Northern Ireland that same month. Following his appointment as Commander United Kingdom Maritime Forces in September 2008, he was given command of the European Union's first naval task force assembled to protect international shipping in the waters off Somalia in December 2008. He was made Assistant Chief of the Naval Staff in June 2009.

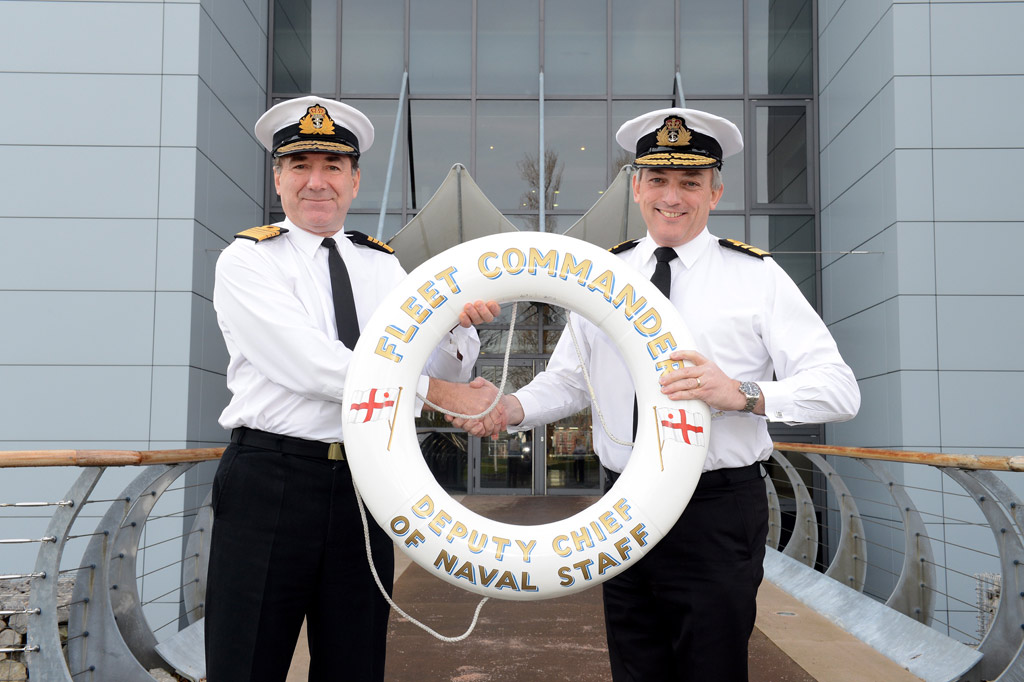
Jones being appointed to Fleet Commander in 2012.

Jones was appointed Companion of the Order of the Bath (CB) in the 2012 New Year Honours. He was promoted to vice admiral and appointed Deputy Commander-in-Chief Fleet and Chief of Staff Navy Command Headquarters on 13 December 2011. His post was re-designated Deputy Fleet Commander in April 2012 and he became Fleet Commander and Deputy Chief of the Naval Staff on 30 November 2012. It was reported on 29 January 2016 that Jones would be promoted admiral and assume the position of First Sea Lord in April 2016. Jones handed over his duties of Fleet Commander to Vice Admiral Ben Key on 10 February, and took over as First Sea Lord on 8 April.

Jones was appointed Knight Commander of the Order of the Bath (KCB) in the 2014 Birthday Honours. He was appointed a Deputy Lieutenant of Hampshire in February 2019, awarded the United States Legion of Merit in the degree of Commander in May, and was succeeded by Admiral Tony Radakin as First Sea Lord on 19 June.

Jones was advanced to Knight Grand Cross of the Order of the Bath (GCB) in the 2020 New Year Honours, and retired from the navy on 3 January 2020.

== Family and personal ==
In 1987 Jones married Elizabeth Collins; they have one son and two daughters. His interests include sports, reading and hill walking.

Jones has received Honorary Doctorates from Heriot-Watt University in 1993 and from the University of Liverpool in 2017.

Military offices
| Preceded by Tony Johnstone-Burt | Flag Officer Scotland, Northern England and Northern Ireland; February – September 2008 | Succeeded by Martin Alabaster |
| Preceded by George Zambellas | Commander United Kingdom Maritime Forces; 2008–2009 | Succeeded by Peter Hudson |
| Preceded by Robert Cooling | Assistant Chief of the Naval Staff; 2009–2011 | Succeeded by Matt Parr |
| Preceded by George Zambellas | Deputy Commander-in-Chief Fleet; 2011–2012 | Re-designated as Deputy Fleet Commander |
| New title | Deputy Fleet Commander; 2012 | Vacant |
| Preceded by Sir George Zambellas | Fleet Commander and Deputy Chief of the Naval Staff; 2012–2016 | Succeeded by Ben Key |
| Preceded by Sir George Zambellas | First Sea Lord; 2016–2019 | Succeeded by Tony Radakin |
