= Andrew Burns (Royal Navy officer) =

Royal Navy Vice Admiral (born 1969)

Vice Admiral Andrew Burns CB OBE
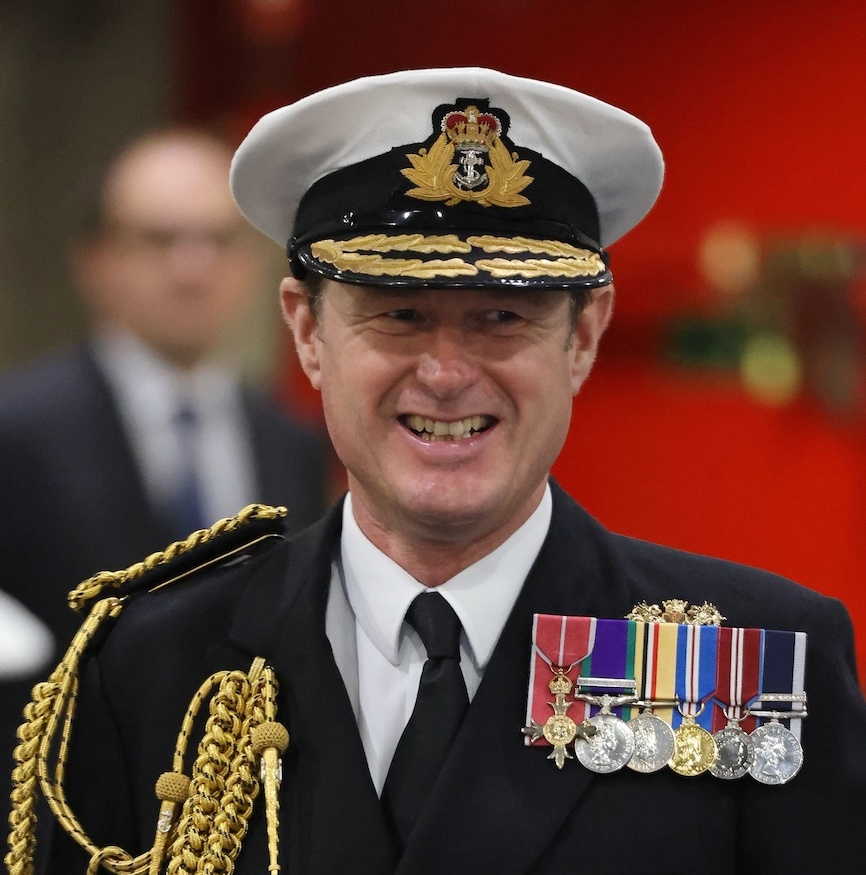
- Vice Admiral Burns in 2022
- Born: 20 November 1969 (age 56)
- Military career
- Allegiance: United Kingdom
- Branch: Royal Navy
- Service years: 1992–2026
- Rank: Vice Admiral
- Commands: Fleet Commander; United Kingdom Maritime Forces; Amphibious Task Group; HMS Bulwark; HMS Somerset; HMS Berkeley
- Conflicts: Iraq War
- Awards: Companion of the Order of the Bath; Officer of the Order of the British Empire

Vice Admiral Andrew Paul Burns, CB, OBE (born 20 November 1969) is a former senior Royal Navy officer. He served as Fleet Commander from September 2021 to September 2025.

== Naval career ==
Educated at Portsmouth Grammar School, Sherborne School and Durham University (Hatfield College) (1989–1992), Burns joined the Royal Navy in 1992. He also holds an MA degree in Defence Studies from King's College London. He was given command of the minesweeper HMS Berkeley in 2000 and, after being deployed to Iraq as a Director for Communications and Information Systems in 2004, he became commanding officer of the frigate HMS Somerset in 2009 and then of the assault ship HMS Bulwark in 2012. He became Principal Staff Officer to the Commander Joint Forces Command in 2013, and Commander Amphibious Task Group in May 2016.

In February 2019, Burns was promoted to rear admiral, and appointed Commander United Kingdom Maritime Forces and Rear Admiral Surface Ships. He was appointed Assistant Chief of the Naval Staff (Capability) in January 2020 and was also given the title of Director Develop as of September 2020. He was promoted to vice admiral and took up the post of Fleet Commander in September 2021. He stepped down as Fleet Commander in September 2025, and retired from the navy on 30 January 2026.

== Honours ==
Burns was appointed Officer of the Order of the British Empire (OBE) in the 2015 Birthday Honours, and Companion of the Order of the Bath (CB) in the 2021 Birthday Honours.

He received the 2nd Clasp to the Naval Long Service and Good Conduct Medal in 2024.

Military offices
Preceded by Jerry Kyd	Commander United Kingdom Maritime Forces (Commander United Kingdom Strike Force from late 2019); February 2019 – December 2019	Succeeded by Michael Utley
Preceded by Hugh Beard	Controller of the Navy; 2020–2021	Succeeded by James Parkin
Preceded by Jerry Kyd	Fleet Commander; 2021–2025	Succeeded by Steve Moorhouse
