= Alex Burton =

Royal Navy Rear Admiral

Rear Admiral Alex Burton
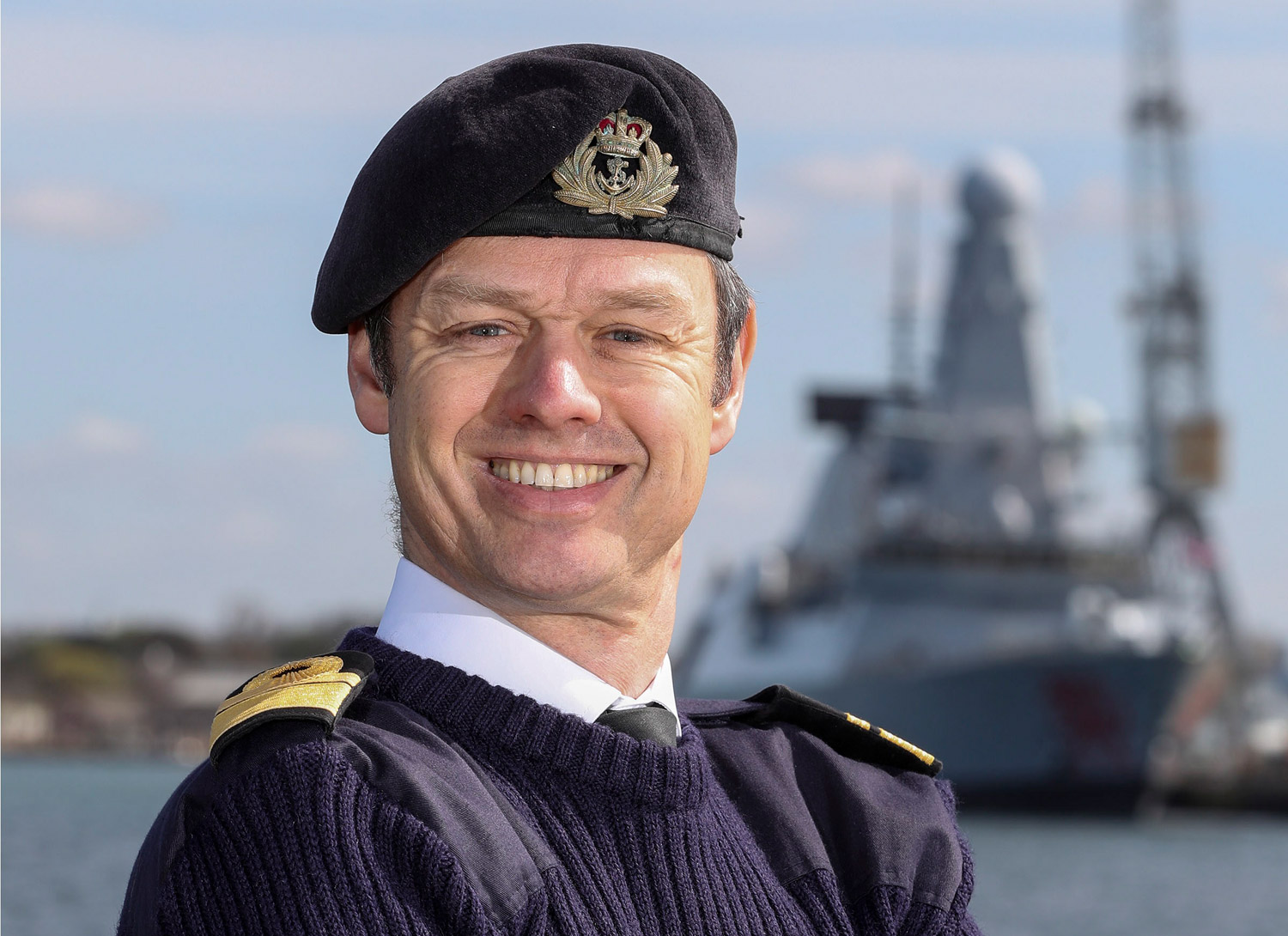
- Military career
- Allegiance: United Kingdom
- Branch: Royal Navy
- Service years: 1986–2018
- Rank: Rear Admiral
- Commands: Maritime Forces; HMS Bulwark; HMS Northumberland; HMS Inverness
- Conflicts: Iraq War
- Awards: Bronze Star Medal (United States)

Rear Admiral Alexander J. Burton is a retired senior Royal Navy officer who served as Commander United Kingdom Maritime Forces and Rear Admiral Surface Ships.

== Early life and education ==
Burton was educated at St Dunstan's College and Durham University.

== Naval career ==
Burton joined the Royal Navy in 1986. He served as commanding officer of the minehunter HMS Inverness and then as commanding officer of the frigate HMS Northumberland before going on to be Military Assistant to the Under Secretary of State at the Ministry of Defence in 2006, Senior Advisor to the Iraqi Vice Chief of the Defence Staff in 2007 and Head of Operations for North Africa, Middle East and Pakistan in 2008. He was awarded the US Bronze Star Medal on 21 July 2009. After that he became commanding officer of the amphibious transport dock HMS Bulwark in late 2010.

Burton was appointed Assistant Chief of Staff, Operations (Maritime Capability) at the Ministry of Defence in September 2012 and Assistant Chief of the Naval Staff (Ships and Submarines) in October 2014. He became Commander United Kingdom Maritime Forces and Rear Admiral Surface Ships in January 2016. It is suggested he handed in his notice in September 2017 as a protest against proposed cuts to the Royal Navy including the axing of both beach-assaulting warships and 1,000 Royal Marines. Burton officially retired on 3 February 2018.

Military offices
| Preceded by Tony Radakin | Commander United Kingdom Maritime Forces; 2016–2017 | Succeeded by Paul Bennett |
