= Commander United Kingdom Carrier Strike Group =

Royal Navy unit

Commander United Kingdom Carrier Strike Group (COMUKCSG)
- Official badge of COMUKCSG
- Incumbent; Commodore James Blackmore
- Royal Navy; Ministry of Defence
- Reports to: Commander United Kingdom Strike Force
- Nominator: Secretary of State for Defence
- Term length: 2 years
- Inaugural holder: Commodore Alan D. Richards
- Formation: 2006-2011, 2015-present

The Commander United Kingdom Carrier Strike Group, (COMUKCSG) is a senior British Royal Navy appointment which commands the UK Carrier Strike Group. COMUKCSG, a Commodore, commands a total of 65 personnel, and is headquartered at HMNB Portsmouth.

== History ==
The post holder was first established in 2006 as Commander, United Kingdom Carrier Task Group it was later re-designated UK Carrier Strike Group.

Commodore Cunningham, the previous COMUKCSG, flew his broad pennant throughout the January to May Orion '08 deployment, as Commander Task Group 328.01, which included exercises with the Indian Navy, aboard HMS Illustrious.

The appointment of Commander UK Carrier Strike Group was disestablished in January 2011, following the 2010 Strategic Defence and Security Review. The post was re-established in February 2015.

== List of Commanders Carrier Strike Group (first iteration) ==
- Commodore Alan D. Richards: 2006-July 2007
- Commodore Thomas A. Cunningham: July 2007-April 2009
- Commodore Simon J. Ancona: April 2009-January 2011

== List of Commanders UK Carrier Strike Group (second iteration) ==
- Commodore Jeremy P. Kyd: February 2015-September 2016
- Commodore Andrew Betton: September 2016-October 2018
- Commodore Michael D. Utley: October 2018-December 2019
- Commodore Stephen M.R. Moorhouse: December 2019-January 2022
- Commodore Angus Essenhigh: January 2022-May 2023
- Commodore James Blackmore: May 2023-present

== See also ==
- Royal Navy Surface Fleet
- Queen Elizabeth-class aircraft carrier
- Commander United Kingdom Strike Force
- Commander Littoral Strike Group
