= James Burnell-Nugent =

Royal Navy Admiral (born 1949)

Admiral Sir James Burnell-Nugent KCB CBE
- Born: 20 November 1949 (age 76)
- Military career
- Allegiance: United Kingdom
- Branch: Royal Navy
- Service years: 1971–2007
- Rank: Admiral
- Commands: Fleet; Naval Home Command; Commander United Kingdom Maritime Forces; HMS Invincible; 2nd Frigate Squadron; HMS Brilliant; HMS Conqueror; HMS Olympus
- Conflicts: Kosovo War; War in Afghanistan
- Awards: Knight Commander of the Order of the Bath; Commander of the Order of the British Empire

Admiral Sir James Michael Burnell-Nugent, KCB, CBE (born 20 November 1949) is a retired Royal Navy officer who served as Commander-in-Chief Fleet from 2005 to 2007.

== Early life and education ==
Burnell-Nugent was educated at Stowe School, then an all-boys private school in Buckinghamshire. He studied mathematics at Corpus Christi College, Cambridge, graduating with a Bachelor of Arts (BA) degree: as per tradition, his BA was later promoted to a Master of Arts (MA Cantab) degree.

== Naval career ==
Burnell-Nugent joined the Royal Navy in 1971. He was appointed an acting lieutenant on 1 November 1972, and confirmed in this rank in June 1974.

He was given command of the diesel submarine HMS Olympus in 1978, and was promoted to lieutenant-commander on 1 November 1980. Appointed in command of the nuclear-powered submarine HMS Conqueror in 1984, he carried out many Cold War patrols. He was promoted to commander on 30 June 1985. He became commanding officer of the frigate HMS Brilliant as well as captain of the 2nd Frigate Squadron in 1992, and in that capacity was involved in the early stages of the Bosnia Crisis. He was in command of the aircraft carrier HMS Invincible and made two joint operational deployments to the Gulf for air operations over Iraq and then conducted further air operations during the Kosovo War. He became Assistant Chief of the Naval Staff in 1999. As Commander United Kingdom Maritime Forces from 2001 to 2002, he was Maritime Commander of the UK Joint Force and the Deputy Maritime Commander of the Coalition for the first 6 months of the War in Afghanistan.

On promotion to vice admiral, Burnell-Nugent took up the post of Second Sea Lord and Commander-in-Chief Naval Home Command in 2003. On 15 November 2005, he was promoted to admiral and took up his position as Commander-in-Chief Fleet. He also held the honorary position of Vice-Admiral of the United Kingdom from 2005 to 2007. Burnell-Nugent stood down from this position in November 2007, and was replaced by Admiral Sir Mark Stanhope. He retired in 2008.

Burnell-Nugent was appointed a Commander of the Order of the British Empire in 1999 and a Knight Commander of the Order of the Bath in 2004.

== Later life ==
Burnell-Nugent served as High Sheriff of Devon for 2015 to 2016. Burnell-Nugent currently runs Orchard Leadership.

== Personal life ==
In 1973, Burnell-Nugent married Mary, a medical doctor and the daughter of the Rt Revd Robin Woods, an Anglican bishop. Together, they have four children: three sons and one daughter. His grandfather was Frank Burnell-Nugent, a brigadier-general in the British Army.

Burnell-Nugent is an Anglican Christian. He is a churchwarden and a local worship leader.

Military offices
| Preceded by Jonathon Band | Assistant Chief of the Naval Staff; 1999–2001 | Succeeded by Timothy McClement |
| New title | Commander United Kingdom Maritime Forces; 2001–2002 | Succeeded by David Snelson |
| Preceded by Sir Peter Spencer | Second Sea Lord; 2003–2005 | Succeeded by Sir Adrian Johns |
| Preceded by Sir Jonathon Band | Commander-in-Chief Fleet; 2005–2007 | Succeeded by Sir Mark Stanhope |
Honorary titles
| Preceded by Sir Jeremy Black | Vice-Admiral of the United Kingdom; 2005–2007 | Succeeded by Sir Mark Stanhope |
