= Mike Utley (Royal Navy officer) =

Royal Navy Vice Admiral (born 1970)

Vice Admiral Sir Mike Utley KCB OBE
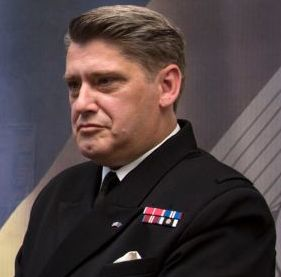
- Commodore Utley in 2018
- Born: 9 March 1970 (age 56); Cardiff
- Military career
- Allegiance: United Kingdom
- Branch: Royal Navy
- Service years: 1990–2026
- Rank: Vice Admiral
- Service number: C034872K
- Commands: Allied Maritime Command; United Kingdom Maritime Forces; United Kingdom Carrier Strike Group; Standing NATO Maritime Group 2 HMS Illustrious; HMS Portland; HMS Tyne; HMS Leeds Castle; HMS Exploit
- Awards: Knight Commander of the Order of the Bath; Officer of the Order of the British Empire

Vice Admiral Sir Michael Keith Utley, KCB, OBE is a former senior Royal Navy officer whose last post was as Commander Allied Maritime Command, NATO from 2023 to 2026.

== Naval career ==
Educated at Cowbridge School, Utley joined the Royal Navy in September 1988 at Britannia Royal Naval College, Dartmouth, passing out in December 1989. He became the commanding officer of the patrol ship HMS Exploit in 1995, of the patrol ship HMS Leeds Castle in 2003, and of the patrol ship HMS Tyne in 2004, before becoming commanding officer of the frigate HMS Portland in 2006, with promotion to commander on 30 June 2006. He went on to become Commander Sea Training in 2010, before being appointed the last commanding officer of the aircraft carrier HMS Illustrious in May 2013 and in that role was deployed to provide humanitarian aid in the wake of Typhoon Haiyan in the Philippines in November 2013.

Utley became commander of Standing NATO Maritime Group 2 in June 2017, Commander United Kingdom Carrier Strike Group in October 2018, and Commander United Kingdom Strike Force in December 2019. He was promoted to vice-admiral on 13 January 2023, and assumed command of NATO's Allied Maritime Command the same month. This posting ended after three years in January 2026, and he formally retired from the Royal Navy on 12 June 2026.

Utley was appointed Officer of the Order of the British Empire (OBE) for his service in the wake of Typhoon Haiyan in the Philippines in the 2015 Special Honours, and Companion of the Order of the Bath (CB) in the 2020 Birthday Honours. He was advanced to Knight Commander of the Order of the Bath (KCB) in the 2026 New Year Honours.

Military offices
Preceded by Andrew Burns	Commander United Kingdom Strike Force; 2019–2022	Succeeded by Robert Pedre
Preceded by Keith Blount	Commander Allied Maritime Command; 2023–2025	Succeeded by Robert Pedre
