= Neil Morisetti =

Royal Navy Rear Admiral

Rear Admiral Neil Morisetti CB
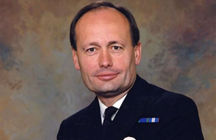
- Military career
- Allegiance: United Kingdom
- Branch: Royal Navy
- Service years: 1976–2013
- Rank: Rear Admiral
- Commands: Joint Services Command and Staff College; Commander United Kingdom Maritime Forces; HMS Invincible; 5th Destroyer Squadron; HMS Cardiff; HMS Cygnet
- Awards: Companion of the Order of the Bath

Rear Admiral Neil Morisetti, CB is a retired Royal Navy officer who is a Professor of Climate and Resource Security at University College London's Science, Technology, Engineering and Public Policy Department, where he is also Vice Dean (Public Policy) in the Faculty of Engineering Sciences.

== Naval career ==
Morisetti was educated at the City of London School, and subsequently joined the Royal Navy in 1976. After initial training at Britannia Royal Naval College in Dartmouth, he held shore postings and attended the University of East Anglia and graduated with a Bachelor of Science. In 1986 he was appointed commanding officer of the patrol boat HMS Cygnet of the Northern Ireland Squadron.

Morisetti was later Principal Warfare Officer of the frigate Cumberland, and in 1991 joined the Naval Secretary's Department as an officers' appointer in 1991. From 1993 to 1994 he was commanding officer of the destroyer Cardiff.

After attending the Joint Service Defence College, Morisetti joined the Directorate of Navy Plans and Programmes in 1995. He was then Chief Staff Officer for Plans and Programmes to Flag Officer Surface Flotilla, before returning to command Cardiff as Captain 5th Destroyer Squadron in 1999.

Morisetti returned to the Ministry of Defence as deputy director of Resources and Plans, and was then appointed Director TOPMAST, the project developing a new Royal Navy manpower system, as a commodore.

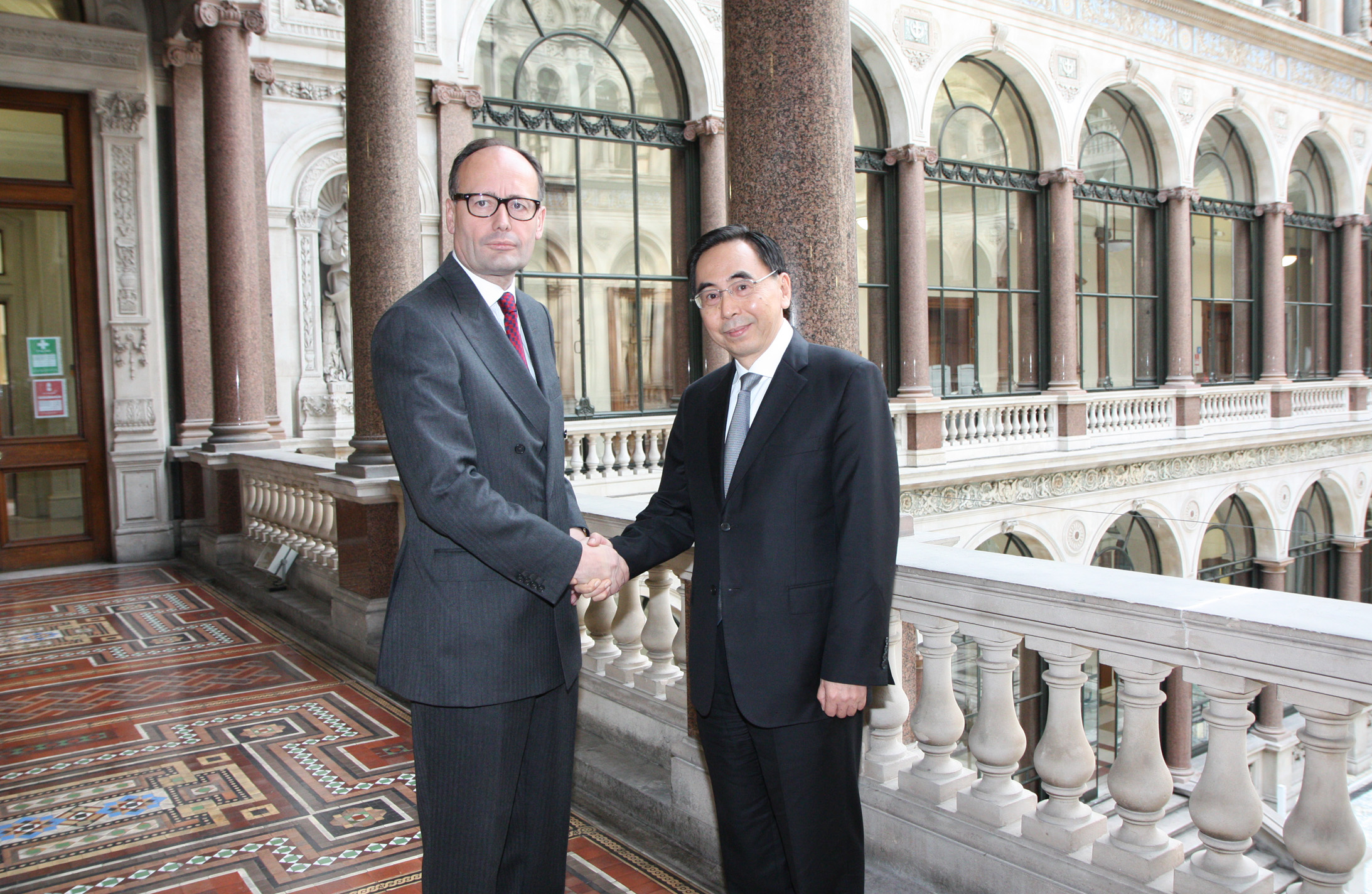
Neil Morisetti meeting Zhu Xiaodan in 2013

After attending the Higher Command and Staff Course in 2004, Morisetti took command of the aircraft carrier Invincible. Invincible acted as the flagship during the Trafalgar 200 naval review off Portsmouth in June 2005, before being paid off the following month. In November 2005 he was promoted to rear admiral and appointed Commander United Kingdom Maritime Forces (COMUKMARFOR), also serving as NATO High Readiness Force Maritime Commander. In July 2007 he was appointed Commandant of the Joint Services Command and Staff College. Morisetti was appointed a Companion of the Order of the Bath (CB) in the 2009 Birthday Honours, and the following November became the United Kingdom's Climate and Energy Security Envoy. In January 2013 he was appointed as the Foreign Secretary's interim Special Representative for Climate Change, a position he held for ten months.

== Post-navy career ==
Following his retirement from the Royal Navy, Morisetti was initially appointed an Honorary Professor and Director of Strategy at University College London's Science, Technology, Engineering and Public Policy Department in January 2014. In 2021 he was appointed Professor of Climate and Resource Security.

Morisetti is a Freeman of the City of London.

== Footnotes ==
Military offices
Preceded by Charles Style	Commander United Kingdom Maritime Forces; 2005–2007	Succeeded by George Zambellas
Preceded by Nigel Maddox	Commandant of the Joint Services Command and Staff College; 2007–2009	Succeeded by Graham Binns
