= Paul Bennett (Royal Navy officer) =

Royal Navy Vice Admiral

Vice Admiral Paul Bennett CB OBE
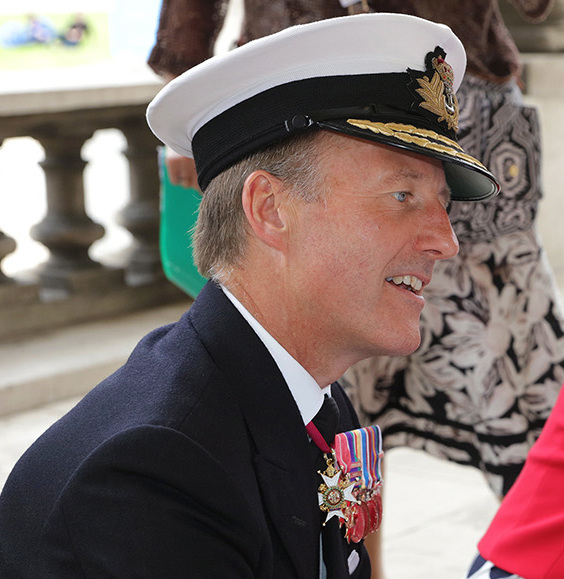
- Rear Admiral Bennett in 2017
- Military career
- Allegiance: United Kingdom
- Branch: Royal Navy
- Service years: 1985–2022
- Rank: Vice admiral
- Commands: Commander United Kingdom Maritime Forces; Commander Amphibious Task Group; HMS Daring; HMS Exeter; HMS Atherstone; HMS Biter
- Conflicts: Iraq War
- Awards: Companion of the Order of the Bath; Officer of the Order of the British Empire

Vice Admiral Paul Martin Bennett, CB, OBE is a former senior Royal Navy officer, who serves as National President of the Royal British Legion.

== Early life and education ==
Bennett was educated at Hymers College and Newcastle University.

== Naval career ==
Bennett joined the Royal Navy in 1985. He trained as a navigator before being given command the minehunter HMS Atherstone in 1996 and the destroyer HMS Exeter in 1998. He became the first Commanding Officer of the Royal Navy's first Type 45 destroyer HMS Daring, in 2008 taking the ship from the builders yard and through her sea trials. Subsequently promoted to Commodore he was appointed Commander Amphibious Task Group in May 2009, Commodore Naval Personnel Strategy in January 2011 and Director of the Development, Concepts and Doctrine Centre in February 2013.

After that he became Chief of Staff at Joint Forces Command in September 2013 and Assistant Chief of Naval Staff (Capability) and Controller of the Navy in May 2016. He was made Commander United Kingdom Maritime Forces in November 2017, which was followed by appointment as Chief of Staff of NATO Allied Command Transformation in July 2018. He was succeeded by Vice Admiral Guy Robinson in September 2021, and subsequently retired in February 2022.

Bennett was appointed an Officer of the Order of the British Empire in the 2007 Birthday Honours, and a Companion of the Order of the Bath in the 2016 Birthday Honours.

== Later life ==
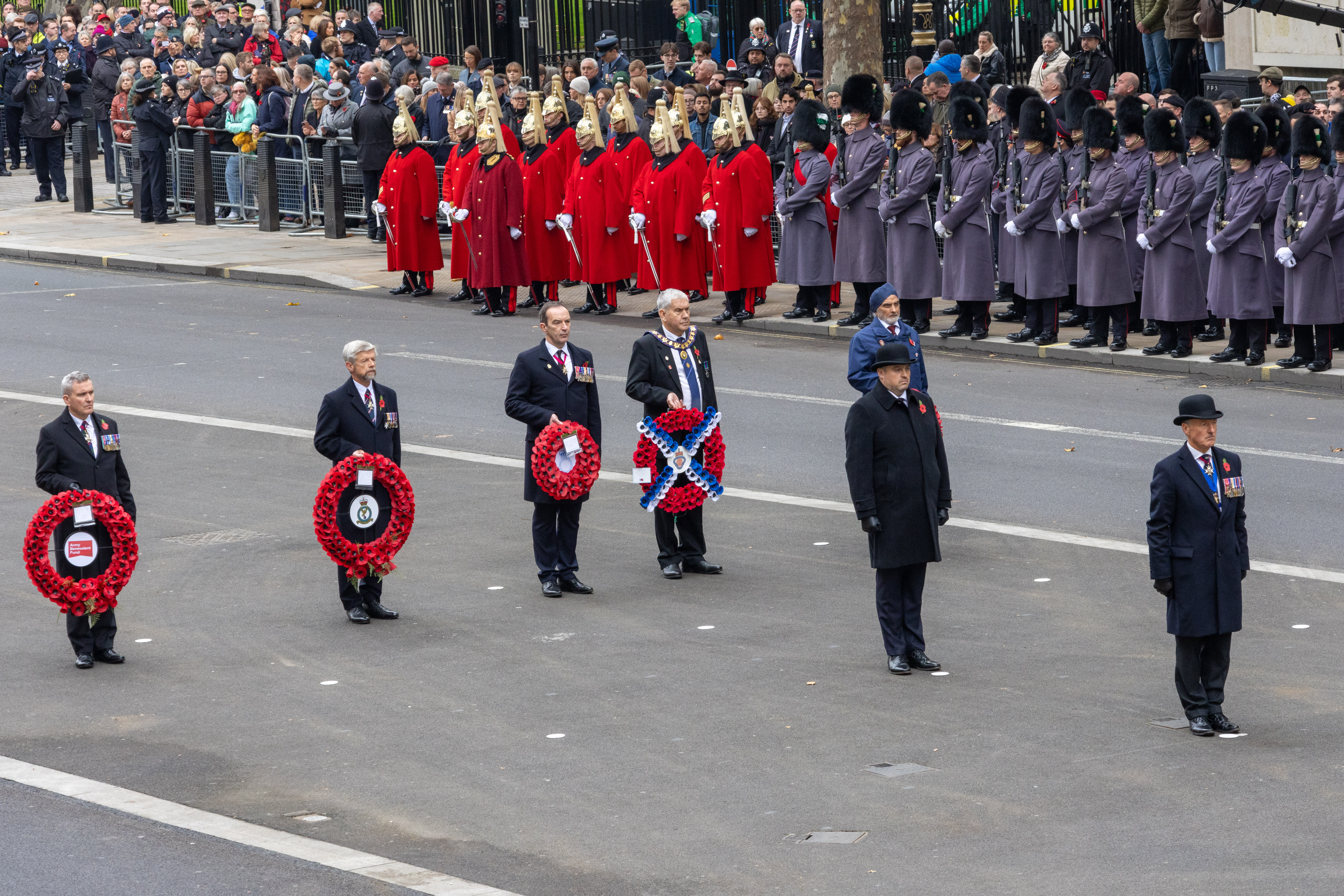
Bennett (right) at the 2024 Remembrance Sunday parade at the Cenotaph

In October 2024, Bennett became national president of the Royal British Legion.

Military offices
Preceded by James Morse	Controller of the Navy; 2016–2017	Succeeded by Robert Magowan
Preceded by Alex Burton	Commander United Kingdom Maritime Forces; 2017–2018	Succeeded by Jerry Kyd
