= David Snelson =

Royal Navy Rear Admiral (born 1951)

Rear Admiral David Snelson CB
- Born: 27 May 1951 (age 75)
- Military career
- Allegiance: United Kingdom
- Branch: Royal Navy
- Service years: 1969–2006
- Rank: Rear Admiral
- Commands: Commander United Kingdom Maritime Forces; HMS Ark Royal; HMS Liverpool
- Conflicts: Iraq War
- Awards: Companion of the Order of the Bath

Rear Admiral David George Snelson, CB (born 27 May 1951) is a former Royal Navy officer who served as Commander United Kingdom Maritime Forces from 2002 to 2004.

== Naval career ==
Snelson joined the Royal Navy in 1969. He first became commanding officer of the destroyer HMS Liverpool in 1987, and again as captain 3rd Destroyer Squadron in 1997. He then became director of naval operations and trade under the Naval Staff at the Ministry of Defence in 1998 and director of navy staff duties in 1999 before commanding the aircraft carrier HMS Ark Royal in 2001. He was appointed Commander United Kingdom Maritime Forces in 2002. In March 2003, he was the Royal Navy commander for Operation Telic, during which he led maritime operations for the Invasion of Iraq from his headquarters ashore in Bahrain. He went on to be chief of staff (warfare) for the fleet in 2004 before retiring in 2006.

After leaving the Navy, Snelson served as chief harbour master for the Port of London Authority between 2006 and 2011. He then served as a non executive director for the Maritime and Coastguard Agency and the Port of Milford Haven between 2011 and 2018. In 2013, Snelson was elected as an Elder Brother of the Corporation of Trinity House. In 2020 Snelson became a trustee of the Association of Sail Training Organisations (ASTO).

Military offices
Preceded by James Burnell-Nugent	Commander United Kingdom Maritime Forces; 2002–2004	Succeeded by Charles Style
