= Charles Style =

Former Royal Navy Vice Admiral (born 1954)

Vice Admiral Charles Style CBE
- Born: 15 January 1954 (age 72)
- Military career
- Allegiance: United Kingdom
- Branch: Royal Navy
- Service years: 1974–2012
- Rank: Vice admiral
- Commands: Royal College of Defence Studies; Commander United Kingdom Maritime Forces; HMS Illustrious; HMS Campbeltown; HMS Andromeda
- Conflicts: Sierra Leone Civil War; War in Afghanistan
- Awards: Commander of the Order of the British Empire

Vice Admiral Charles Rodney Style, CBE (born 15 January 1954) is a former Royal Navy officer who served as Commandant of the Royal College of Defence Studies from 2008 to 2012.

== Naval career ==
The son of Lieutenant Commander Godfrey Style and his wife Sigrid, Style was educated at Eton and St Catharine's College, Cambridge, where he was an exhibitioner and graduated with a degree in geography in 1975. Upon graduation, he joined the Royal Navy and spent time at the Britannia Royal Naval College in Dartmouth. He commanded the frigates HMS Andromeda and HMS Campbeltown and the aircraft carrier HMS Illustrious. He was appointed Equipment Capability Manager for Precision Attack in 2002, Commander United Kingdom Maritime Forces in 2004 and Deputy Chief of the Defence Staff (Commitments) in 2006. In 2007 he had to deal with the detention of fifteen Royal Navy personnel by Iranian Revolutionary Guards. He became Commandant of the Royal College of Defence Studies in 2008.

Military offices
| Preceded by David Snelson | Commander United Kingdom Maritime Forces; 2004–2005 | Succeeded by Neil Morisetti |
| Preceded by Sir Robert Fry | Deputy Chief of the Defence Staff (Commitments); 2006–2007 | Succeeded by Sir Peter Wall |
| Preceded by Sir Ian Garnett | Commandant of the Royal College of Defence Studies; 2008–2012 | Succeeded by Sir David Bill |
