= Peter Hudson (Royal Navy officer) =

Former Royal Navy admiral

Vice Admiral Peter Hudson CB CBE
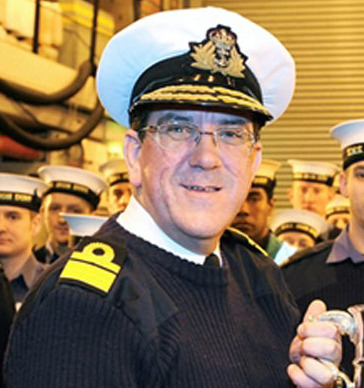
- Born: 25 June 1961 (age 65); Manchester, United Kingdom
- Military career
- Allegiance: United Kingdom
- Branch: Royal Navy
- Service years: 1980–2016
- Rank: Vice Admiral
- Commands: Allied Maritime Command; United Kingdom Maritime Forces; Amphibious Task Group; HMS Albion; HMS Norfolk; HMS Cottesmore
- Awards: Companion of the Order of the Bath; Commander of the Order of the British Empire

Vice Admiral Peter Derek Hudson, CB, CBE (born 25 June 1961) is a retired Royal Navy officer who served as Commander Allied Maritime Command until October 2015.

== Early life and education ==
Hudson was born on 25 June 1961 in Manchester, England. He was educated at Netherthorpe Grammar School in Derbyshire. He underwent officer training at Royal Naval College, Dartmouth, and later undertook studies in maths and economics with the Open University (BSc).

== Naval career ==
Hudson joined the Royal Navy in 1980. He became commanding officer of the minesweeper HMS Cottesmore in 1994 (deployed on fishery protection duties), commanding officer of the frigate HMS Norfolk in 1996 and Fleet Operations Officer in 1998. He went on to be leader of the team rationalising the regional fleet headquarters in 2000, commanding officer of the assault ship HMS Albion in 2002, Director of Naval Resources and Plans at the Ministry of Defence in 2005 and Commander Amphibious Task Group in 2008 (deployed as commander of the maritime Coalition Task Force in the Gulf). He was appointed Commander United Kingdom Maritime Forces in 2009 (deployed as commander of EU maritime operations off Somalia), and Chief of Staff (Capability) for the Fleet in 2011.

Hudson was Commander Allied Maritime Command from February 2013 until October 2015. He was appointed a Companion of the Order of the Bath in the 2015 New Year Honours. He was placed on the retired list in January 2016.

== Later life ==
Having retired from the navy, he worked as director of international maritime programs for L3 Technologies from 2016 to 2018. He has been senior naval advisor to BAE Systems since 2018.

Hudson is Vice Chairman of the Commonwealth War Graves Commission.

Military offices
Preceded by Sir Philip Jones	Commander United Kingdom Maritime Forces; 2009–2011	Succeeded by Duncan Potts
Preceded by Sir George Zambellas	Commander Allied Maritime Command; 2013–2015	Succeeded by Clive Johnstone
