= Mark Edgar John Anderson =

Royal Navy Rear Admiral

Rear Admiral Mark Anderson CBE
- Military career
- Allegiance: United Kingdom
- Branch: Royal Navy
- Service years: 1996–present
- Rank: Rear Admiral
- Commands: HMS Richmond; Commander United Kingdom Strike Force
- Awards: Commander of the Order of the British Empire; Officer of the Legion of Merit (United States)

Rear Admiral Mark Edgar John Anderson CBE is a senior Royal Navy officer and current Commander United Kingdom Strike Force.

== Naval career ==
Brought up in Belfast, Anderson entered Britannia Royal Naval College on 18 September 1996. He was given command the Type 23 frigate HMS Richmond in 2014. Promoted to commodore, he became deputy commander of Combined Maritime Forces in 2024 and, after being promoted to rear admiral on 23 June 2025, he became Commander United Kingdom Strike Force in 2025.

He was appointed a Commander of the Order of the British Empire in the 2022 New Year Honours. He was appointed an Officer of the Legion of Merit (United States) in the June 2026 Operational Honours.

Military offices
Preceded by Robert Pedre	Commander United Kingdom Strike Force; 2025–present	Incumbent
