= Allied Maritime Command =

Central command for all NATO maritime forces

- Founded: 1 December 2012
- Allegiance: NATO
- Branch: Sea warfare
- Type: Tactical level command
- Role: Command and control of maritime forces
- Part of: Allied Command Operations
- Headquarters: Northwood Headquarters, Hertfordshire, UK
- Website: mc.nato.int

Commanders
- Commander: Vice admiral Robert Pedre; Royal Navy
- Deputy Commander: Vice Admiral; Ludovic Poitou; French Navy
- Chief of Staff: Rear Admiral; Jose Enrique Delgado; Spanish Navy

The Allied Maritime Command (abbr. MARCOM) is the central command of all NATO maritime forces and the Commander MARCOM is the prime maritime advisor to the Alliance. When directed by the Supreme Allied Commander Europe (SACEUR), it provides the core of the headquarters responsible for the conduct of maritime operations. The command is based at Northwood Headquarters in Eastbury, Hertfordshire.

Locations of NATO's two strategic commands — Allied Command Transformation (ACT) with its subordinate centres (blue marks) and Allied Command Operations (ACO), headquartered at Supreme Headquarters Allied Powers Europe (SHAPE) and including its subordinate and joint force commands (red marks).

== History ==
The Commander-in-Chief, Home Fleet (Royal Navy), gained a NATO responsibility as Commander-in-Chief Eastern Atlantic Area (CINCEASTLANT), as part of SACLANT, when the NATO military command structure was established in 1953. CINCEASTLANT headquarters was established at Northwood Headquarters in northwest London.

Commander-in-Chief Eastern Atlantic was redesignated as Commander, Allied Maritime Component Command Northwood ('CC-Mar' or AMCCN) around 2004. The command, which was renamed Allied Maritime Command Northwood in 2010, reports to Allied Joint Force Command Brunssum.

At the 2010 NATO summit in Lisbon it was decided to create a leaner and more effective command structure. This reduced the number of major headquarters from 11 to 7 and, in particular, led to the deactivation of the Allied Maritime Command Naples on 27 March 2013 leaving the newly named MARCOM as the sole maritime component in NATO.

MARCOM led Operation Active Endeavour, NATO's only Article-5 operation which ended in 2016. MARCOM also led Operation Ocean Shield, NATO's counter-piracy operation in the Gulf of Aden and Indian Ocean which also ended in 2016.

Currently, MARCOM leads Operation Sea Guardian designed as a Maritime Security Operation to provide security in the Mediterranean Sea.

Peacetime Vigilance Activity is conducted under this command.

== Role ==
MARCOM was created through the North Atlantic Council to ensure the interoperability of NATO maritime forces, and placed directly under the Supreme Allied Commander Europe to be the leading voice on maritime issues within the Alliance. It is responsible for planning and conducting all NATO maritime operations.

== Current structure ==
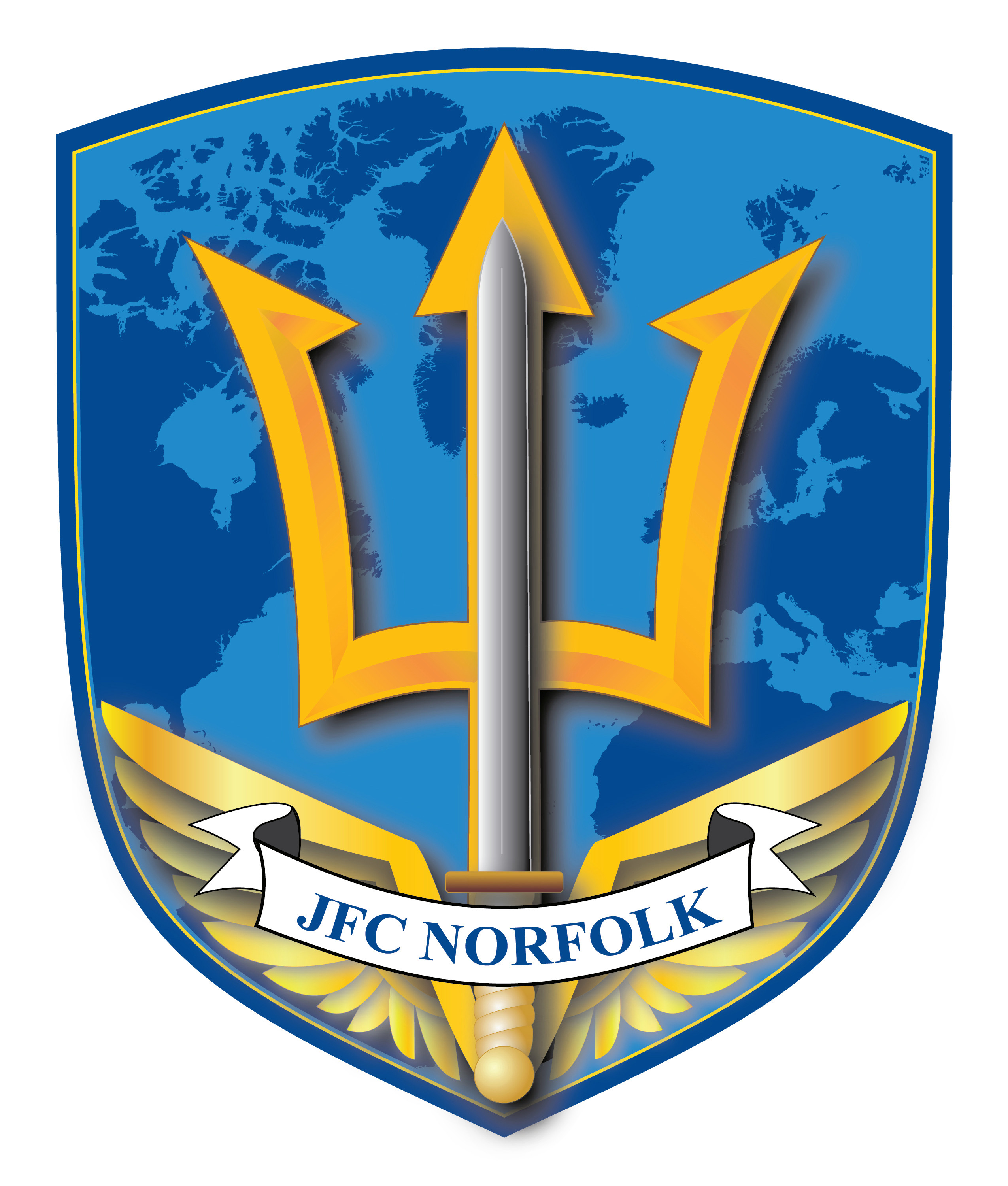
POLITICAL-STRATEGIC LEVEL:	North Atlantic Council (NAC); NATO Headquarters, Brussels, BEL
Secretary-General (SECGEN); NATO Headquarters, Brussels, BEL	International Staff (IS); NATO Headquarters, Brussels, BEL
MILITARY-STRATEGIC LEVEL:
International Military Staff (IMS); NATO Headquarters, Brussels, BEL	Military Committee (MC); NATO Headquarters, Brussels, BEL
STRATEGIC COMMANDS:
Supreme Allied Commander Transformation; Allied Command Transformation (ACT); Norfolk, U.S.	Supreme Allied Commander Europe; Allied Command Operations (ACO); Mons, BEL
TRANSFORMATION COMMANDS:	OPERATIONAL COMMANDS:
Joint Warfare Centre (JWC); Stavanger, NOR	Joint Force Command Brunssum (JFC Brunssum); Brunssum, NLD	Allied Air Command (AIRCOM); Ramstein, DEU
Joint Force Training Centre (JFTC); Bydgoszcz, POL	Joint Force Command Naples (JFC Naples); Naples, ITA	Allied Land Command (LANDCOM); İzmir, TUR
Joint Analysis and Lessons Learned Centre (JALLC); Lisbon, PRT	Joint Force Command Norfolk (JFC Norfolk); Norfolk, Virginia, U.S.	Allied Maritime Command (MARCOM); Northwood, GBR
Joint Support and Enabling Command (JSEC); Ulm, DEU

== Standing Maritime Groups ==
MARCOM leads four standing NATO maritime groups, two frigate groups and two mine countermeasures groups. The Standing NATO Maritime Groups are a multinational, integrated maritime force made up of vessels from allied countries. The ships and any aircraft aboard are available to NATO to support Alliance tasking. These groups provide NATO with a continuous maritime capability. The command is also responsible for additional naval assets as they support NATO missions.

Current groups are:

- Standing NATO Maritime Group 1 (SNMG1)
- Standing NATO Maritime Group 2 (SNMG2)
- Standing NATO Mine Countermeasures Group 1 (SNMCMG1)
- Standing NATO Mine Countermeasures Group 2 (SNMCMG2).

== Commanders ==
Commanders have been:

- Admiral Sir Trevor Soar (2010–2012)
- Admiral Sir George Zambellas (2012–2013)
- Vice Admiral Peter Hudson (2013–2015)
- Vice Admiral Sir Clive Johnstone (2015–2019)
- Vice Admiral Sir Keith Blount (2019–2023)
- Vice Admiral Mike Utley (2023–2025)
- Vice Admiral Robert Pedre (2025–present)

== See also ==
- Standing NATO Maritime Group 2
- Standing NATO Mine Countermeasures Group 1
- Standing NATO Mine Countermeasures Group 2
