= Michael Clapp =

Royal Navy Commodore (born 1932)

Commodore Michael Clapp CB ADC
- Born: 22 February 1932 (age 94)
- Military career
- Allegiance: United Kingdom
- Branch: Royal Navy
- Service years: 1950–1983
- Rank: Commodore
- Commands: 801 Naval Air Squadron; HMS Puncheston; HMS Jaguar; HMS Leander; Commodore Amphibious Warfare (COMAW)
- Conflicts: Korean War, Indonesian Confrontation, Falklands War

Commodore Michael Cecil Clapp, CB, ADC (born 22 February 1932) is a retired senior Royal Navy officer who commanded the United Kingdom's amphibious assault group, Task Group 317.0, in the Falklands War.

== Early life ==
Michael Cecil Clapp was born on 22 February 1932. His parents were Brigadier Cecil Douglas Clapp, CBE Royal Corps of Signals and Mary Elizabeth Emmeline Palmer Clapp. He was educated first at Chafyn Grove School a preparatory school in Salisbury, Wiltshire, then at Marlborough College a private school in Marlborough, Wiltshire, England.

== Naval career ==
=== Korean War 1950–1953 and after ===
Clapp joined the Royal Navy as a special entry cadet in January 1950. On his arrival at the Royal Naval College Dartmouth in 1950 he was told by a chief petty officer "If you can't take a joke, you shouldn't have joined." Something he would remember later in his career. His first major deployment was in the Far East in the Fiji-class cruiser HMS Ceylon for service in the Korean War theatre. For his service in the Korean War he received the Korea Medal and the United Nations Korea Medal with a Korea clasp. From an interview with Michael Clapp:

The ship was employed patrolling the coast of North Korea well behind their front-line bombarding bridges and railways to make the logistic support of those further south difficult. During this time I was mainly employed in charge of the lookouts, QF 4-inch naval gun Mk XVI and Bofors 40 mm gun batteries. When at anchor I enjoyed boat work and often took United States special forces ashore or to an island.

On completion of the midshipman’s final exam he was awarded a first class pass and promoted to acting sub-lieutenant. He then joined HMAS Bataan, a Royal Australian Navy Tribal-class destroyer and continued to patrol the West coast of North Korea. He returned home in August 1952 and went to the Junior Officers Staff Course at the Royal Naval College, Greenwich for two terms. He then undertook the sub-lieutenants' technical courses visiting their establishments with a small group of his term. His group was ‘L’ Group, which was later known by some as "'Ell Group as there were several well known characters who helped make life fun."

=== Cyprus 1954 ===
From an interview with Michael Clapp:

On completion of the courses I was appointed to HMS Comet as the Correspondence Officer and also her Torpedo, Anti-Submarine Officer. She had been deployed along the Suez Canal and in the Red Sea for several weeks supporting both the Army and merchant shipping when she returned to Malta for leave. A couple of days later the ship's company were recalled and she sailed for Cyprus to relieve another destroyer which was running low on fuel. She was employed watching for a caique which was reported to be sailing for Cyprus from near Athens loaded with guns and ammunition. After a day an RAF Shackleton reported a radar contact heading our way from near Athens. The most likely destination was considered to be near Paphos on the western end of Cyprus. On 4th January 1954 she was detected but allowed to land as a flashing light was seen giving away the position of her reception party. The local police were alerted and surrounded the probable landing area. As soon as the flares went up to show her clearly she sailed out to sea. In the darkness that followed the Comet switched off her 20 inch signal projector which was being used as a searchlight, as it was difficult for the coxswain to see which way the caique was moving and how fast.

Clapp was ordered to take charge of a naval boarding party of 11 sailors, including the chief engineer, a signaller, and an engine room artificer. They were equipped with a Lanchester submachine gun, bayonets and Mk IV (.38/200) Webley Revolvers. As he was ordinarily the ship's correspondence officer and also her torpedo anti-submarine officer, he could be easily spared and he was also chosen because as a rugby football player and as a boxer he was fit and strong. Jumping aboard alone, he got tangled up in the rigging and had to be rescued by one of the smugglers, after which he drew his revolver and arrested them. He was then joined by the rest of the boarding party. The caique "Agios Georgios" is now in a museum in Cyprus. See the citation link for a picture of her. For his Canal Zone service Clapp received the Naval General Service Medal 1915 with Canal Zone clasp.

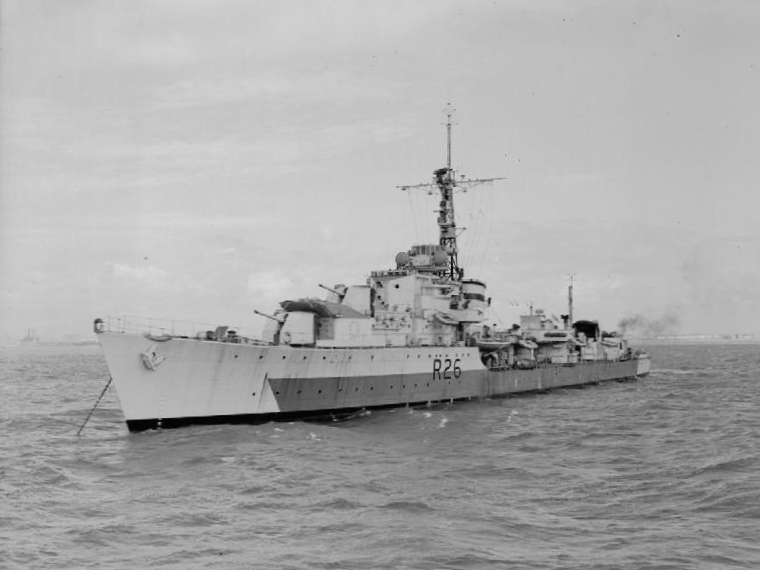
HMS Comet 1945

=== Joins the Fleet Air Arm 1955 ===
From an interview with Michael Clapp: "In 1955, he was pressed into the Fleet Air Arm against his wishes. The Navy was concerned at the growing submarine threat of the Soviet Navy and pressed five officers to become Observers in Airborne Anti-Submarine Warfare (ASW)." In 1955, he was appointed to No. 1 Long Observer Course, expecting to specialise in anti-submarine warfare. In the end however he never joined an ASW Squadron. His first operational flying tour was in fact with 849 Naval Air Squadron in the Airborne early warning and control role. The squadron was equipped with ex United States Navy Douglas Skyraider AD4Ws. These were operated by squadron detachments assigned to the Royal Navy's aircraft carriers HMS Ark Royal, HMS Bulwark, HMS Eagle, HMS Hermes and HMS Victorious. In 1959, after a series of flying courses, he was posted to Ferranti Ltd. to assist in test flying the weapon system for the Blackburn Buccaneer Mk 1 finally joining 700 Naval Air Squadron's Z Flight, the Intensive Flying Trials Unit. 700 Naval Air Squadron (700 NAS) is an experimental test squadron in the Royal Navy's Fleet Air Arm. In 1962, he was the Senior Observer of 801 Naval Air Squadron, then the first operational Mk 1 Blackburn Buccaneer squadron. They embarked first on Ark Royal and then on Victorious on which they sailed for the Far East and tropical trials returning home in January 1964.

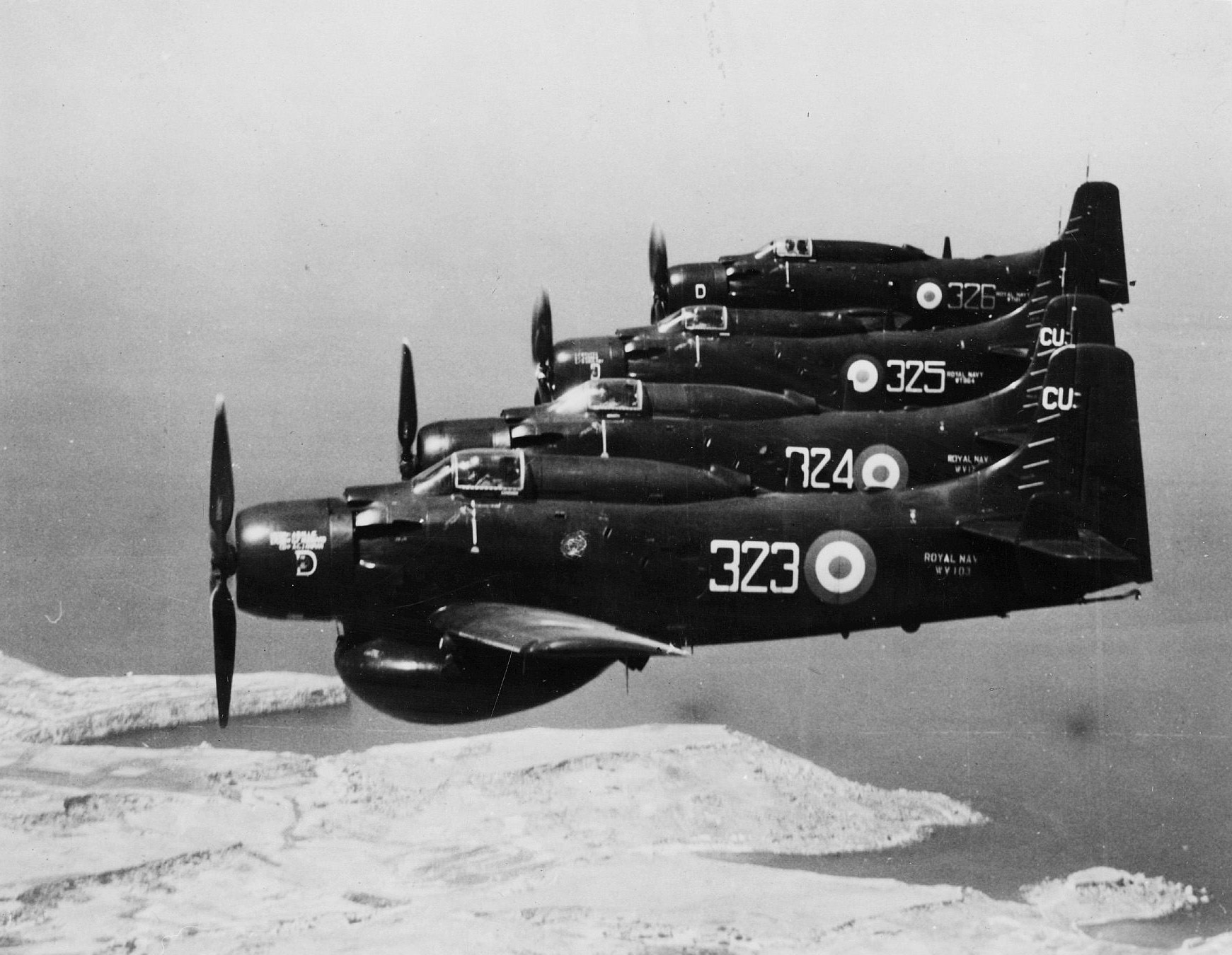
Skyraider AEW1 778 RNAS Culdrose

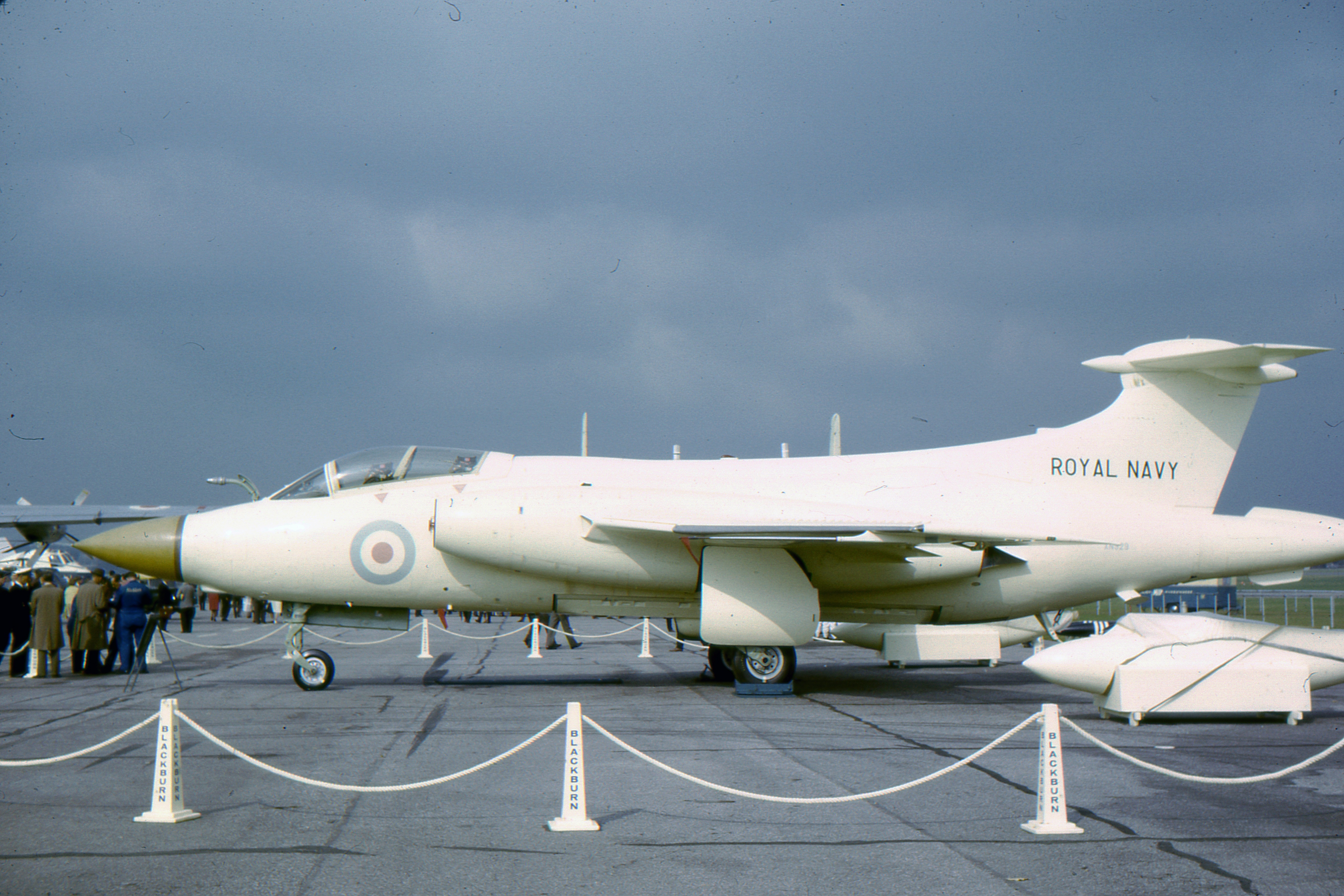
Buccaneer S.1 at the 1962 Farnborough Airshow; the anti-flash white colour scheme is for the nuclear strike role

=== Indonesian Confrontation 1963–1965 ===
He returned to the Far East to command HMS Puncheston, a Ton-class minesweeper, during the Indonesian Confrontation between Malaysia and Indonesia. From an interview with Michael Clapp:

His patrols started in June 1965. His first encounter with the Indonesians was at night near Horsburgh Light to the east of Singapore. It was with large sampans carrying about fourteen soldiers heading for the east coast of Malaya, presumably to infiltrate and cause damage. He managed to capture one and its passengers. Their Sergeant was shot as well as its outboard engine. A second encounter occurred later when he was ordered to patrol the Sunda Straight, which was an international waterway for cargo ships. The Indonesians' territorial limit was 3 miles offshore, a distance that was internationally accepted, but they wished to increase their limit to 12 miles, which would have closed the straight to international shipping. He was steaming in the centre of the passageway when four fast boats were reported approaching from four quarters at high speed and weaving. The ship went to action stations but guns were kept fore and aft. He signalled that he was in international waters and asked why they were threatening his ship. He received no reply but he had reported the situation to the Commander-in-Chief who sent two RAF Hunters who flew over the Indonesian boats to add to our defence. The Indonesian boats then formed a line ahead and drove up Puncheston's starboard side and went away. The ship spent much time off Borneo taking groups of British and Gurkha soldiers and landing them as required.

He received a mentioned in despatches "for distinguished services in the Far East Fleet Patrols and the Borneo Territories during the period 24 December 1964 to 23 June 1965." The 14 December 1965 was when Clapp actually received his Mention in Dispatches oak leaf plus the Malay Peninsula and Borneo clasps for his General Service Medal (1962) "for distinguished services in the Far East Fleet Patrols and the Borneo Territories during the period 24 December 1964 to 23 June 1965.

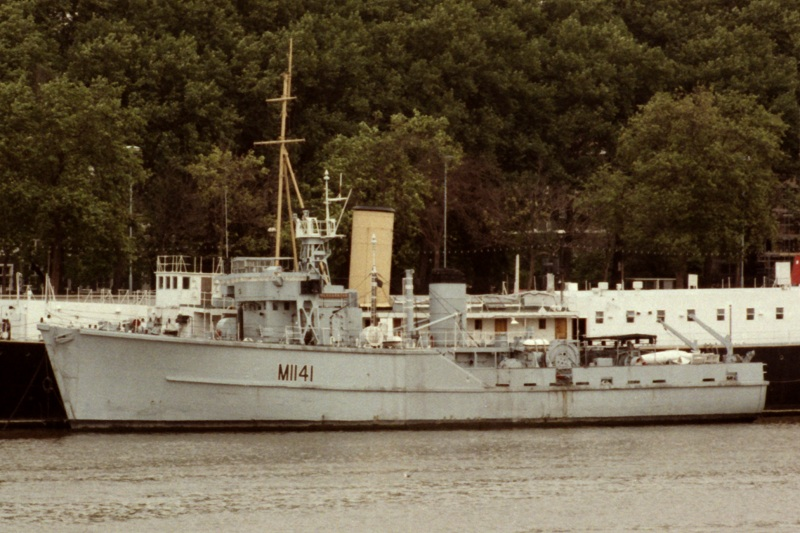
HMS Glasserton, a Ton-class minesweeper

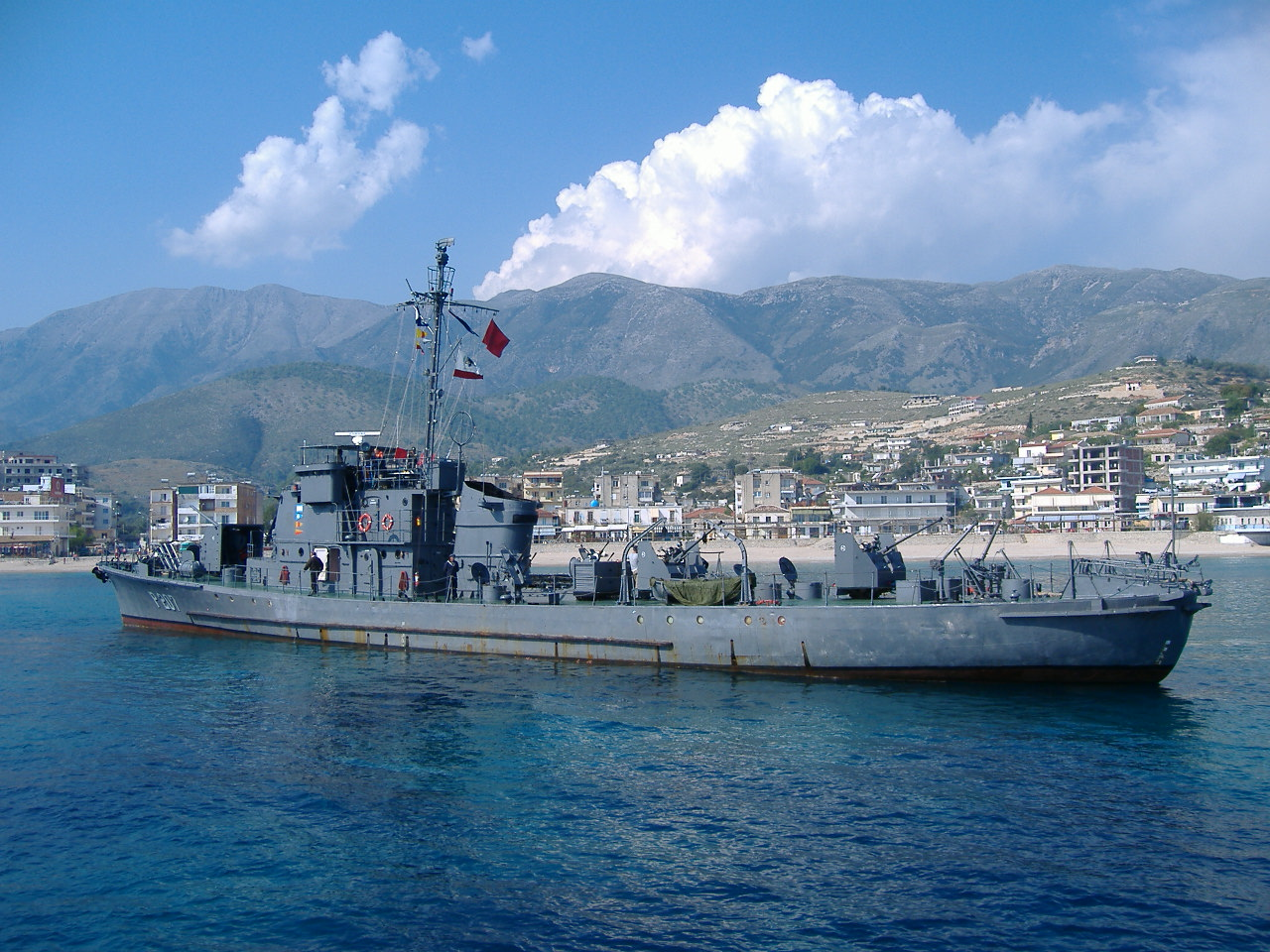
A Kronshtadt-class submarine chaser

=== Later career ===
On 10 December 1965 Lieutenant Commander Clapp took command of 801 Naval Air Squadron now equipped with the Buccaneer Mk. 2. The squadron reformed again at RNAS Lossiemouth on 14 October 1965 with 12 Buccaneer S2 aircraft mainly supplied from 700 Naval Air Squadron's B Flight. 801 Squadron once again embarked in Victorious for testing and operations in the Mediterranean, returning home a year later. The squadron subsequently received the 1967 Boyd Trophy for its efforts in bringing the Buccaneer Mk. 2 into service. He served as her commanding officer until 14 June 1967.

On 2 July 1968 Clapp was promoted from lieutenant commander to commander. He was the executive officer of HMS Norfolk completing Exocet trials in 1974 at Toulon, France. His next promotion was on 5 October 1974 from commander to captain. After a brief stay at the Joint Warfare Establishment, he had two ship commands, HMS Jaguar and HMS Leander. He commanded Leander during GULFX-79 exercises in the Gulf of Mexico from 16 November to 4 December 1978. He also completed two tours in the Naval Staff of the Ministry of Defence. Later he was the naval director of the Joint Maritime Operational Training Staff. In 1981 he was appointed Commodore Amphibious Warfare.

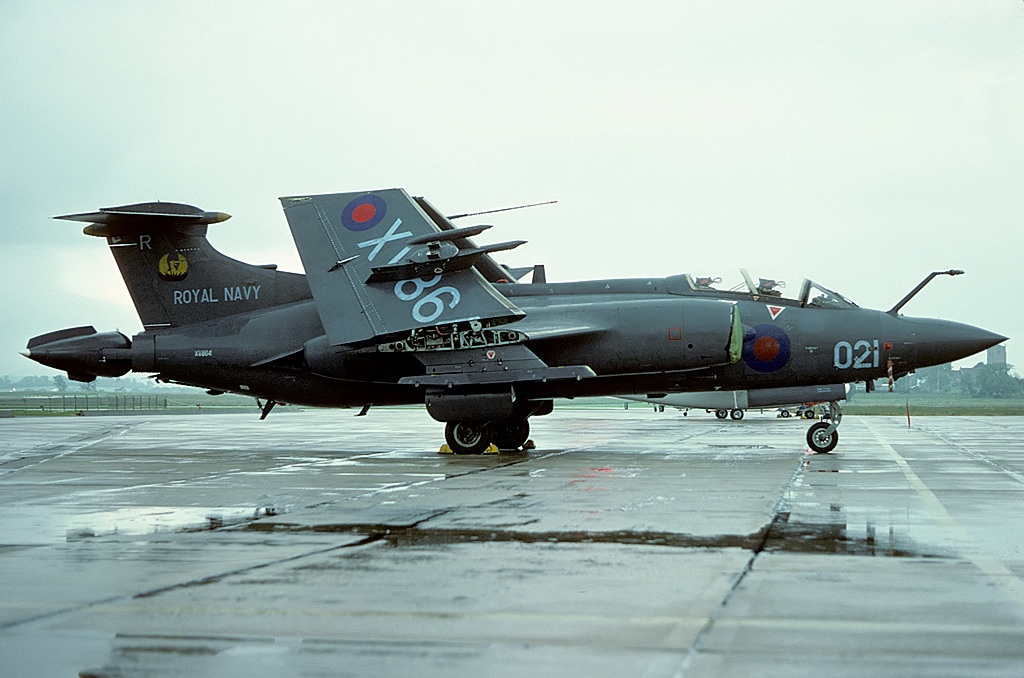
Hawker Siddeley Buccaneer S2, UK - Navy AN1339875

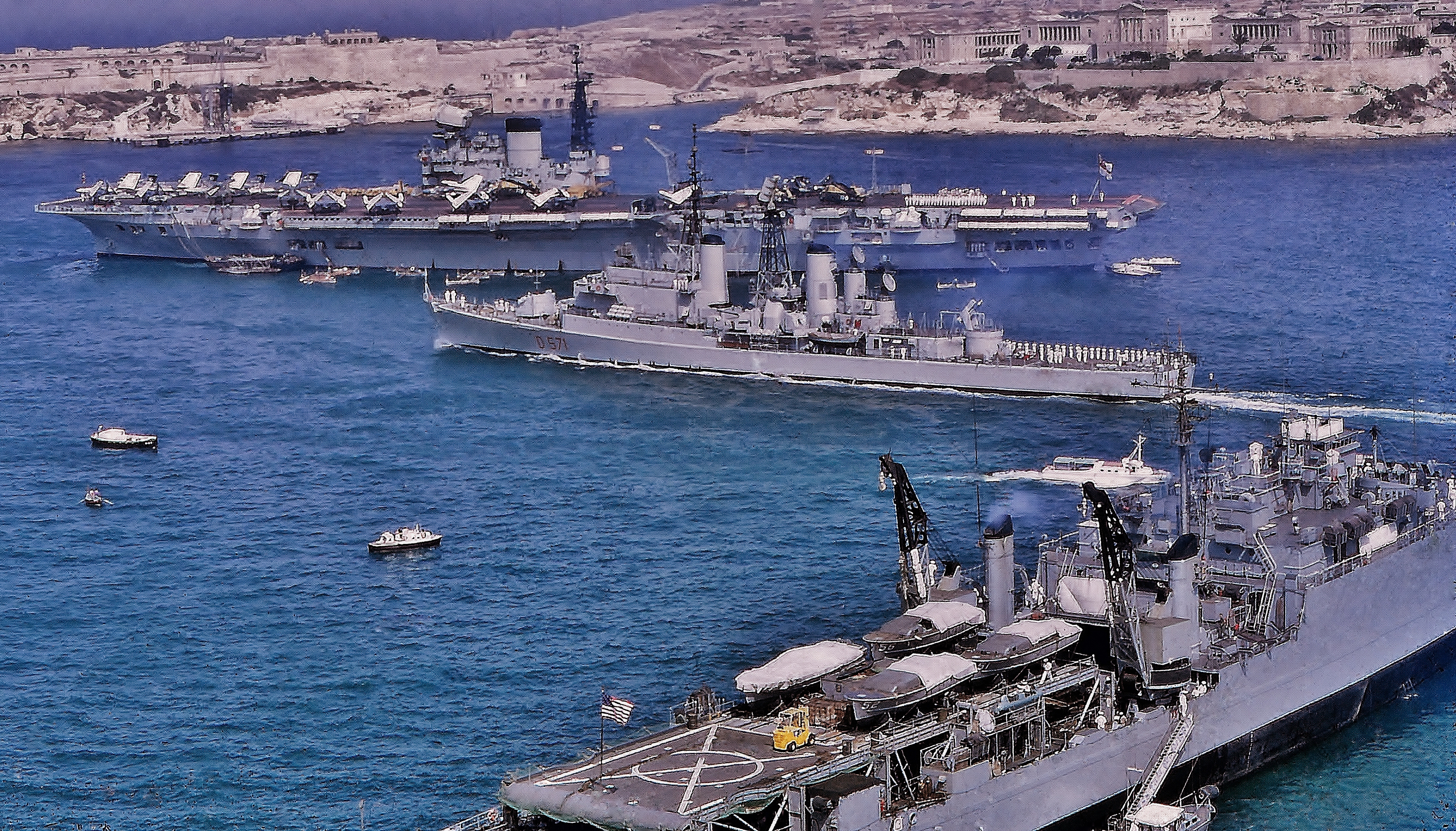
Victorious in Grand Harbour, Malta, en route back to the UK following her 1966–67 Far East cruise.

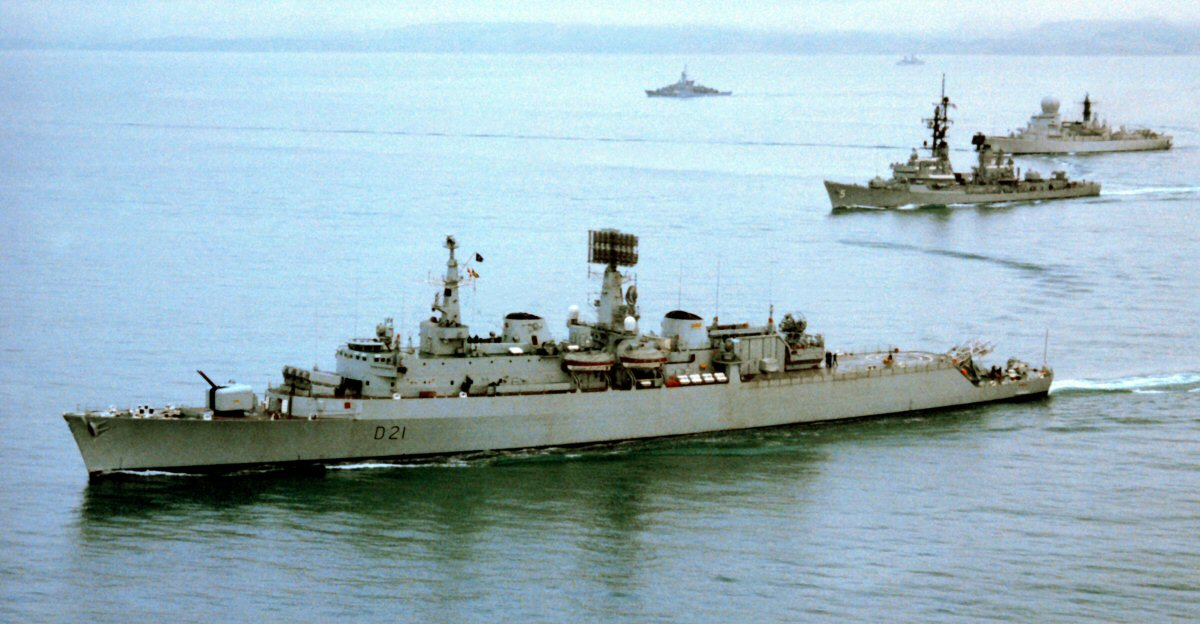
HMS Norfolk (foreground), USS Claude V. Ricketts and HNLMS De Ruyter (rear)

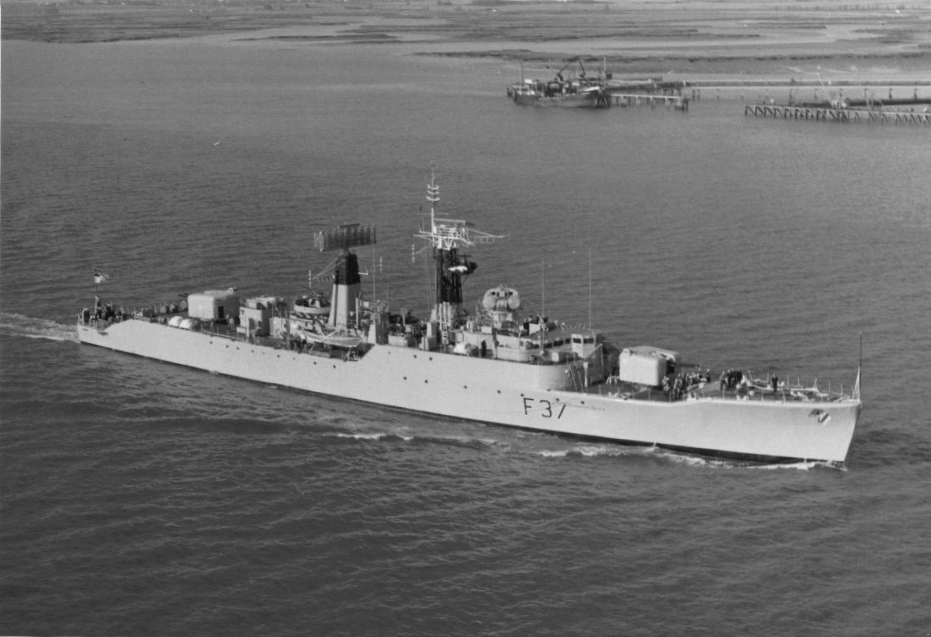
HMS Jaguar of the Leopard class of frigates

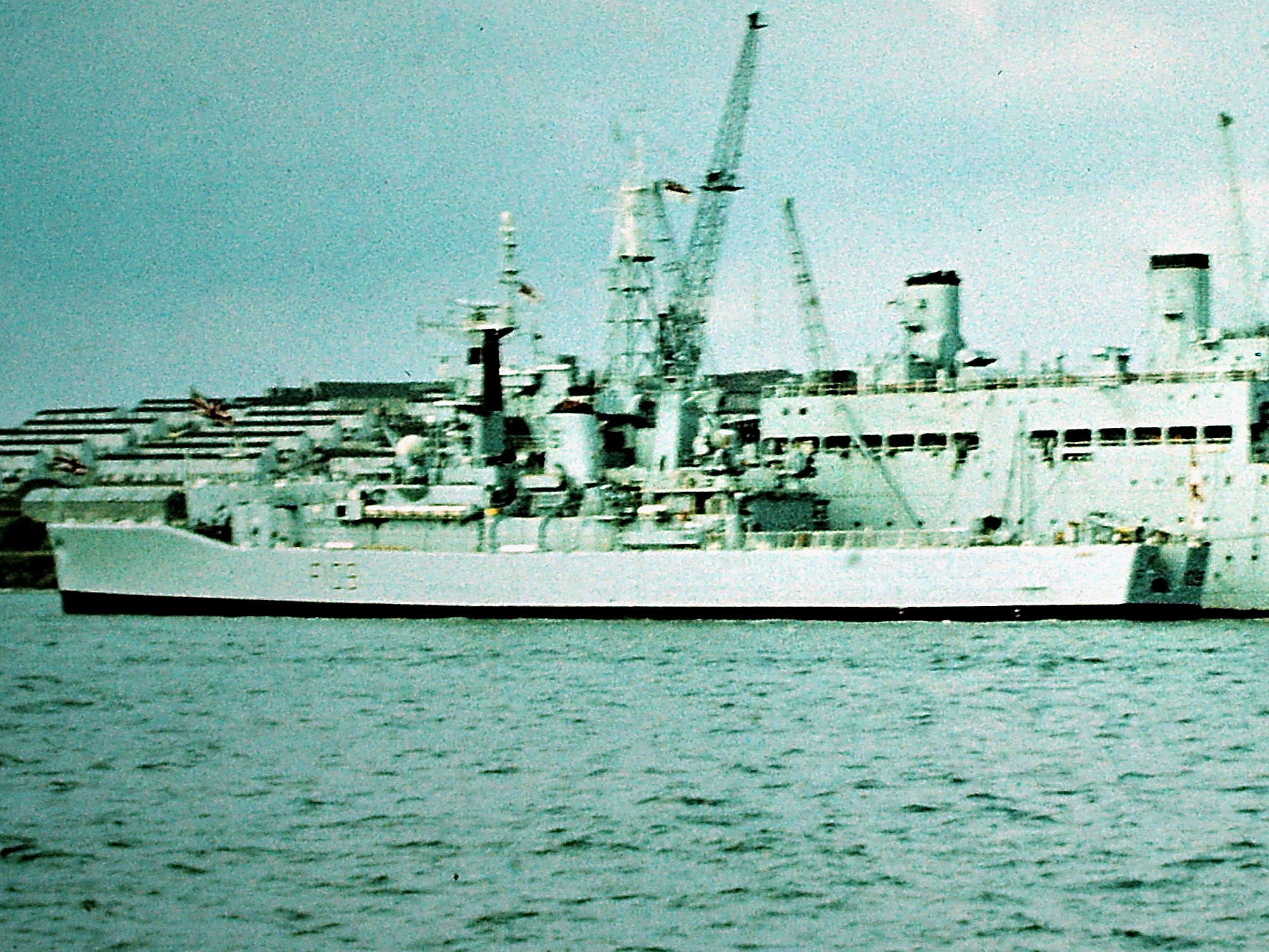
HMS Leander docked at HMNB Devonport, in August 1977

=== Falklands War 1982 ===
In 1982, he commanded the amphibious assault group, Task Group 317.0, in the Falklands War. He served under the Commander-in-Chief Fleet Admiral Sir John Fieldhouse, who was the overall Task Force commander, CTF-317. Task Group 317.0 contained the amphibious ships which launched the actual invasion with Task Group 317.1 being the landing force itself initially consisting of 3 Commando Brigade led by Brigadier Julian Thompson and attached units. South of Ascension Island he was in charge of British logistics in the Falklands War. He was also responsible with Brigadier Thompson for the decision to make the landing at San Carlos Water. The actual amphibious landings were known as Operation Sutton. The air war over the landings was known as the Battle of San Carlos (1982). An example of the difficulties of maintaining the supply lines was the Bluff Cove air attacks.

Clapp was made a Companion of the Order of the Bath for his services in the conflict.

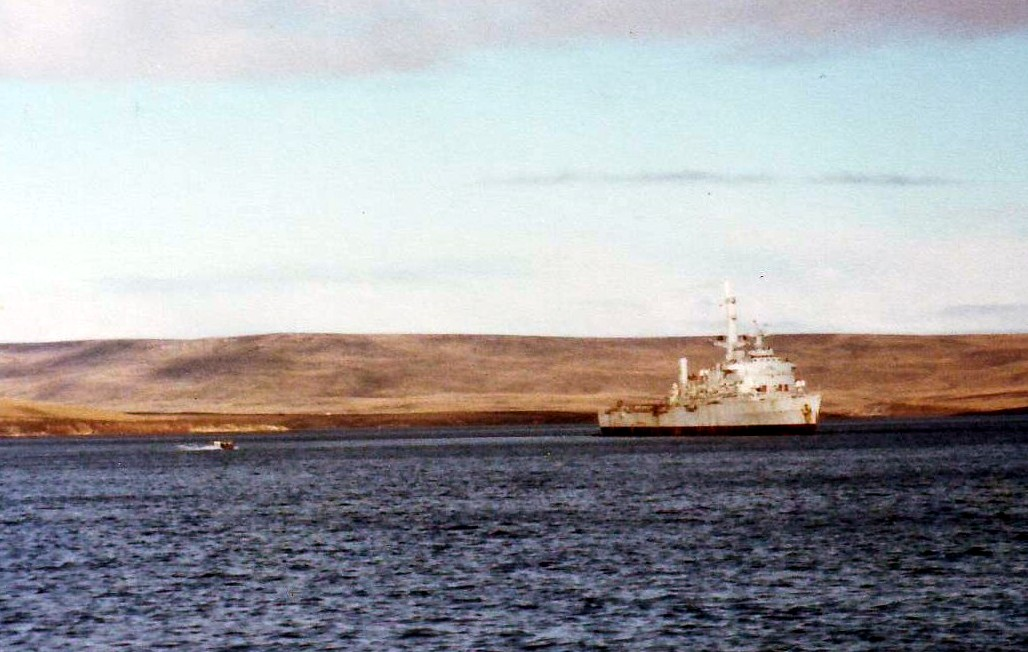
HMS Fearless, San Carlos, 1982

His flagship during the Falklands War was HMS Fearless

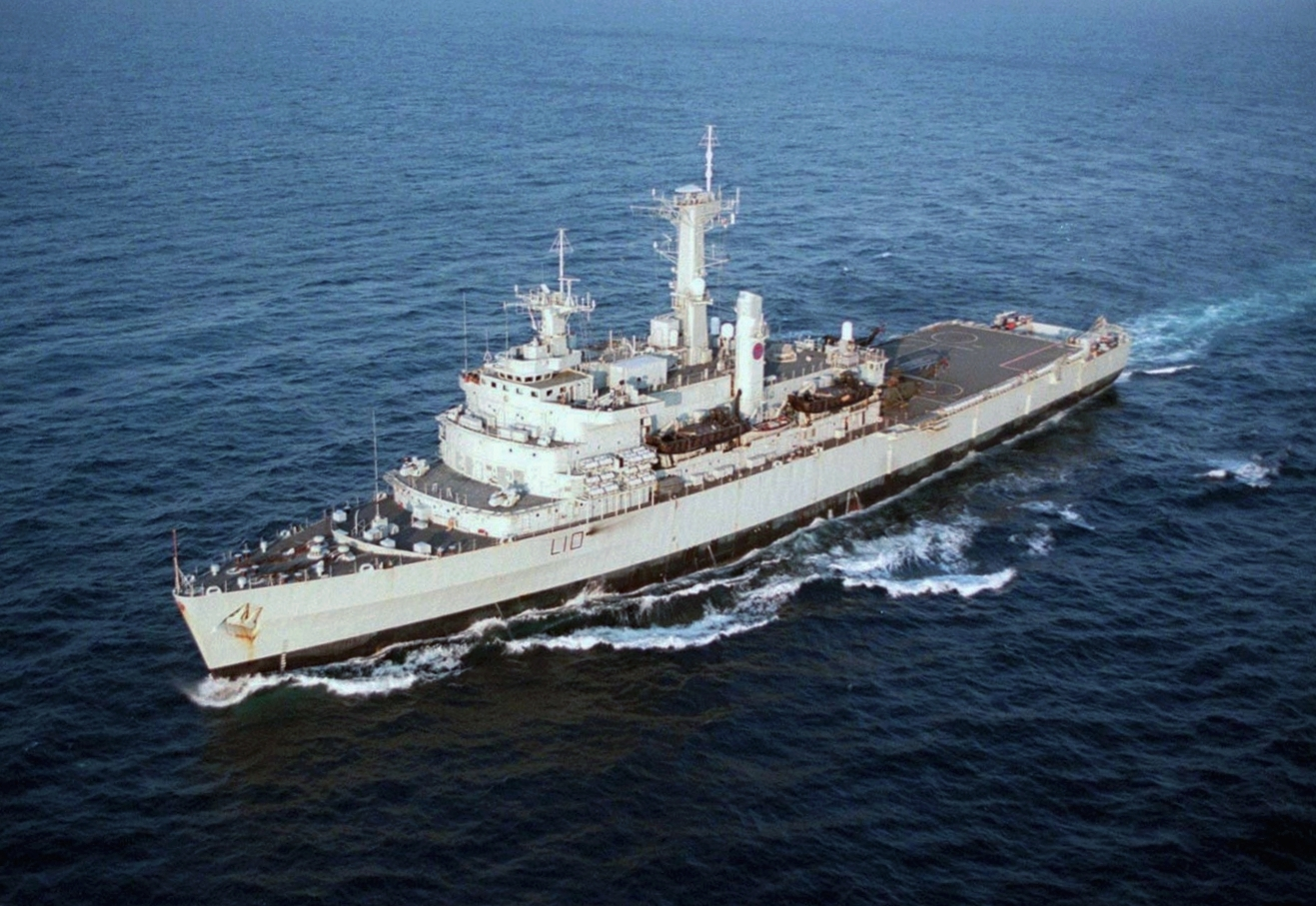
HMS Fearless off North Carolina in 1996

Sounds on board HMS Fearless under attack in the Falklands War

== Personal and later life ==
When he was younger Michael Clapp was a rugby football player and a boxer. In 1975 he married Sarah Jane Alexander. Together they have two daughters Lucy born 1977, Sophie born 1978 and one son James born 1980. After his retirement from the Royal Navy on 7 July 1983 Michael Clapp moved to Devonshire with his family. For at time they lived at Manor Farm, Broadhempston, Totnes, Devonshire formerly the Manor of Broad Hempston. He was a stockbroker and a member of the London Stock Exchange from 1987 to 1995. He was a Director of Kelly College from 13 November 1992 to 17 June 2002 and of its associated corporation from 7 July 1995 to 31 December 2010. His hobbies have included sailing, shooting, fishing, and country life. He is a member of the Royal Cruising Club and when he finally retired he sailed his 28 ft yacht to the Caribbean and back.

=== Publications ===
He wrote a book entitled Amphibious Assault Falklands: the Battle of San Carlos Water, with co-author Ewen Southby-Tailyour, describing the preparations for the amphibious landing, the landing itself and the following amphibious and related land operations of the Falklands War. The book was first published in 1997 with a second edition in 2007.

- Clapp, Michael C.; Southby-Tailyour, Ewen (1997). Amphibious Assault Falklands: the Battle of San Carlos Water. Leo Cooper/Orion. ISBN 0-00-215723-3.

=== Honours and decorations ===
Just before his retirement Michael Clapp was made an Aide de Camp to Queen Elizabeth II from 18 January 1983 to 5 July 1983 which entitles him to use the post-nominal letters "ADC". On 11 October 1982, Clapp was appointed a Companion of the Order of the Bath (CB) 'in recognition of service within the operations in the South Atlantic'. His first decorations were for his service in the Korean War being the Korea Medal and the United Nations Korea Medal. For his Cyprus service Clapp received the Naval General Service Medal 1915. On 14 December 1965 Clapp received a Mention in Dispatches for his General Service Medal (1962) "for distinguished services in the Far East Fleet Patrols and the Borneo Territories during the period 24 December 1964 to 23 June 1965.

Ribbon	Details	Year awarded
	Companion of the Order of the Bath	1982
	Korea Medal	1953
	United Nations Korea Medal	1953
	Naval General Service Medal (1915)	1954
	General Service Medal (1962) with bronze oak leaf for a mention in dispatches	1965
	South Atlantic Medal	1982
	Queen Elizabeth II Silver Jubilee Medal	1977

Military offices
Preceded by Christopher J. Isacke October 1979-May 1981	Commodore Amphibious Warfare	Succeeded by Peter G. V. Dingemans DSO: February 1983-January 1985
