= HMS Southampton (D90) =

Destroyer of the Royal Navy

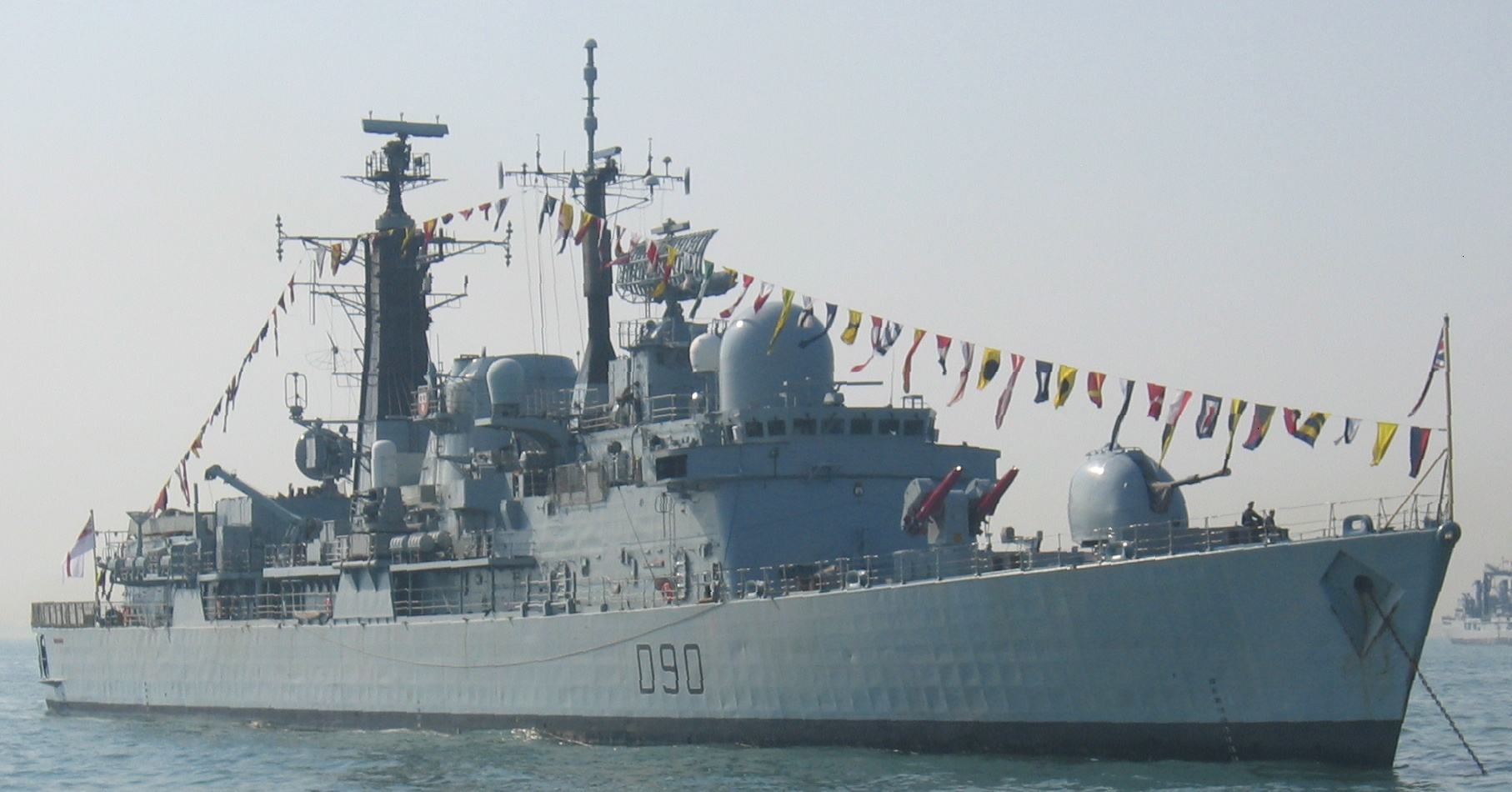
- HMS Southampton dressed overall.

History

United Kingdom
- Name: HMS Southampton
- Ordered: 17 March 1976
- Builder: Vosper Thornycroft
- Laid down: 21 October 1976
- Launched: 29 January 1979
- Commissioned: 31 October 1981
- Decommissioned: 12 February 2009
- Home port: HMNB Portsmouth
- Identification: Pennant number: D90; IMO number: 4907048
- Motto: Pro jusititus pro Rege; (Latin: "For justice and the Queen")
- Nickname(s): "The Mighty Ninety" (after her pennant number).
- Fate: Sold for scrap

General characteristics
- Class & type: Type 42 destroyer
- Displacement: 4,820 tonnes
- Length: 125 m (410 ft 1 in)
- Beam: 14.3 m (46 ft 11 in)
- Propulsion: COGOG (Combined gas or gas) turbines, 2 shafts; 2 Olympus gas turbines, 25,000 shp (19,000 kW) each, 2 Tyne gas turbines, 5,000 shp (3,700 kW) each
- Speed: 30 knots (56 km/h)
- Complement: 287
- Armament: Sea Dart missiles; 4.5-inch (114 mm) Mk 8 gun
- Aircraft carried: Westland Lynx HMA8

HMS Southampton was a batch two Type 42 destroyer of the Royal Navy. She was named after the city of Southampton, England, and built by Vosper Thornycroft, in Southampton. She was the sixth Royal Navy ship to bear the name.

== Operational service ==
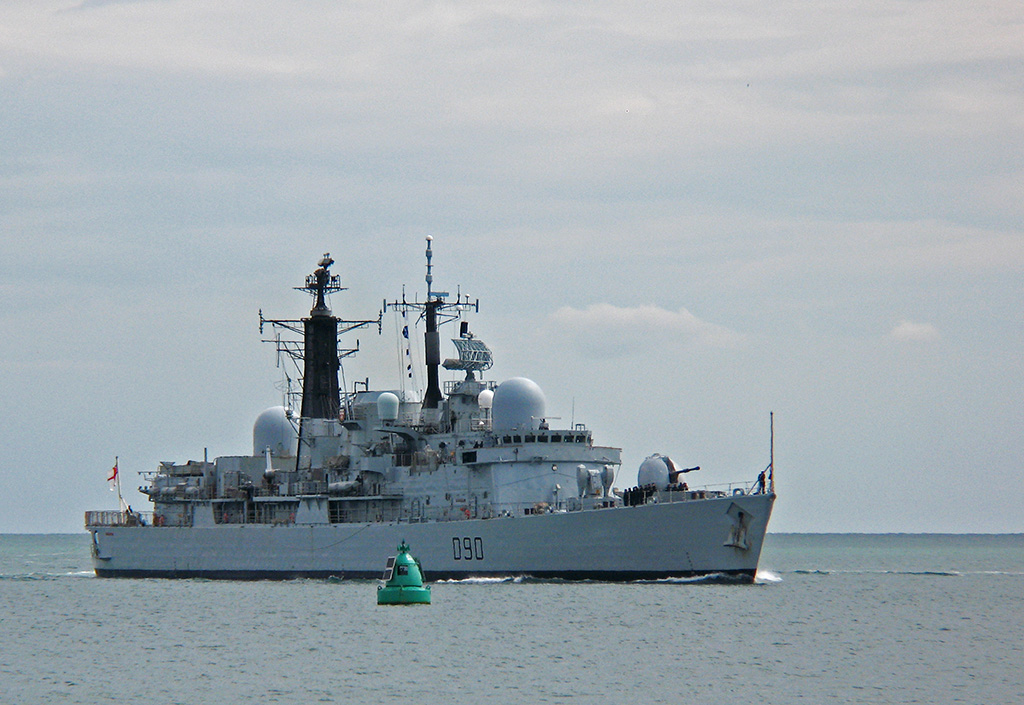
Southampton entering Portsmouth harbour.

=== 1981–2005 ===
In 1984, Southampton ran over one of the Shambles Buoys off Portland during the final Thursday War intended to prepare her to deploy to the Falklands Islands. The collision sank the buoy and resulted in a period in dry dock for repair, after which Southampton left for a six-month deployment as a Falkland Islands guard ship. On 3 September 1988, whilst serving on the Armilla Patrol, Southampton was involved in a collision with MV Tor Bay, a container ship in a convoy being escorted through the Straits of Hormuz. Three members of her crew were slightly injured and a 10-metre (33 ft) hole torn in Southampton's hull. The destroyer was returned to the UK aboard a semi-submersible heavy lift ship.

=== 2006–2011 ===
On 3 February 2006, the ship was involved in the seizing of 3.5 tonnes (3.4 long tons; 3.9 short tons) of cocaine in the Caribbean.

== Fate ==
On 31 July 2008, Southampton was placed in a state of "Extended Readiness" and was decommissioned on 12 February 2009. The ship was auctioned on 28 March 2011 and was later towed from Portsmouth on 14 October 2011 to Leyal Ship Recycling's scrapyard in Aliağa, Turkey.

== Affiliations ==
- The Princess of Wales's Royal Regiment (Queen's and Royal Hampshires)
- No. 25 Squadron RAF
- City of Southampton
- Worshipful Company of Fletchers
- Lord Lieutenant of Hampshire
- Canford School Combined Cadet Force
- Mill Hill School
- Old Southamptons (veterans of the previous HMS Southampton)
- Royal Southampton Yacht Club
- Southampton and Fareham Chamber of Commerce and Industry
- Southampton University Royal Naval Unit
- TS Southampton (Sea Cadet Corps)
- Royal Naval Association Southampton
- Southampton RN Officers Association
