= Martin Wemyss =

Royal Navy Rear Admiral (1927–2022)

Rear-Admiral Martin Wemyss CB
- Born: 5 December 1927; Cambridge, England
- Died: 10 September 2022 (aged 94)
- Military career
- Allegiance: United Kingdom
- Branch: Royal Navy
- Service years: 1945–1981
- Rank: Rear-Admiral
- Nickname: "Whisky"
- Commands: HMS Sentinel; HMS Alliance; HMS Cleopatra; 3rd Submarine Squadron; HMS Norfolk; Second Flotilla
- Awards: Companion of the Order of the Bath

Rear-Admiral Martin La Touche Wemyss (5 December 1927 – 10 September 2022) was a British Royal Navy officer. He followed his father into the navy, joining as an officer cadet in 1945. After service on a number of ships and submarines he passed the Submarine Command Course in 1956 and was appointed to command HMS Sentinel. Wemyss led the Submarine Command Course from 1961 to 1963, instituting higher standards that led to a lower pass rate. He later commanded the 3rd Submarine Flotilla and a number of surface vessels before being appointed director of naval warfare at the Ministry of Defence and aide-de-camp to Elizabeth II. He commanded Second Flotilla from 1977 to 1978 and, after a period as Assistant Chief of the Naval Staff (Operations and Air), retired in 1981.

== Early life ==
Wemyss was born into a family descended from the Earls of Fife. He was born on 5 December 1927 in Cambridge where his mother, Edith Mary Digges La Touche, was living while his father, Commander David "Dicky" Wemyss DSO DSC, served with the Royal Navy on the China Station. Wemyss and his mother lived in Plymouth during the early part of the Second World War. Their house was bombed during the Blitz and Wemyss arrived for his first day at the Westbury House preparatory school wearing a tartan kilt outfit, his only clothing that had survived. He afterwards attended Shrewsbury School. Wemyss intended to study classics at the University of Cambridge but a visit to his father's ship, Wild Goose, convinced him and his brother Gavin to join the navy.

== Royal Navy ==
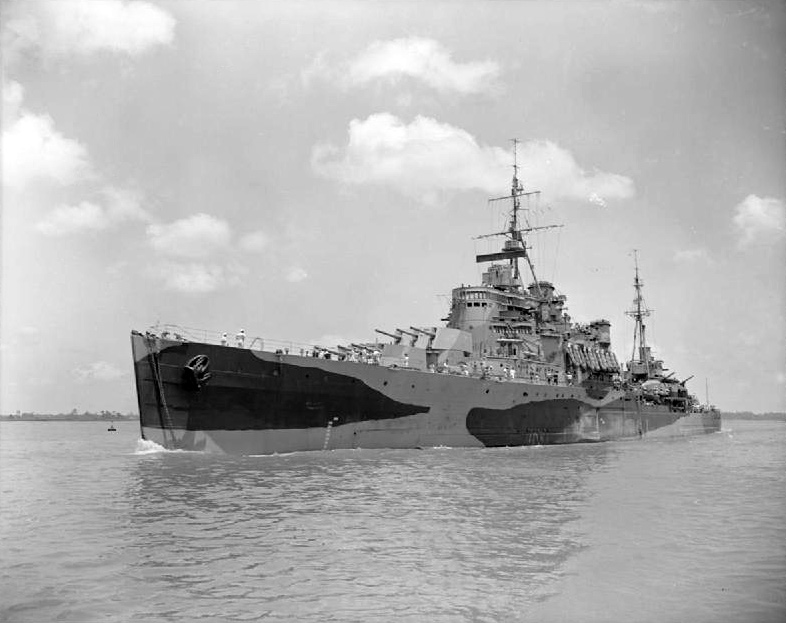
HMS Nigeria

Wemyss joined the training ship Frobisher as a cadet in 1945. He afterwards served as a midshipman aboard the light cruiser Nigeria. During a stopover at Cape Town, South Africa, in April 1947 Wemyss was invited to the 21st birthday celebrations of Princess Elizabeth, who was on a royal tour of the country. Arriving late to the venue and at the wrong entrance Wemyss bumped into George VI who afterwards told his equerry to "put [Wemyss] down for a dance with the girls" (Elizabeth and her 16-year-old sister Princess Margaret.)

Wemyss was promoted to sub-lieutenant on 1 September 1947. From 1949 he served aboard the submarines Alaric and Totem and with the X-class miniature submarine unit under Lieutenant Commander Donald Cameron VC. Wemyss was promoted to lieutenant on 16 February 1950. He married Ann Hall at the Savoy Chapel in London in 1952. The couple had one son and one daughter.

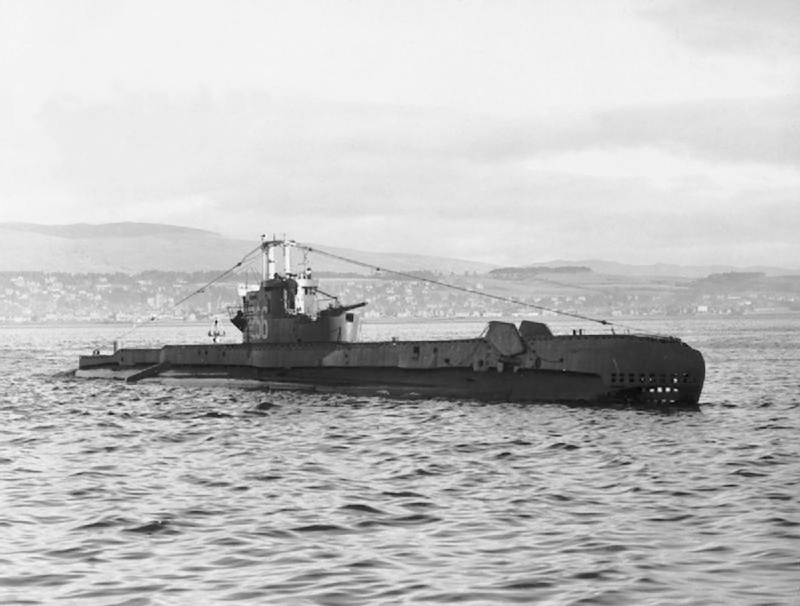
HMS Sentinel

From 1953 to 1954 Wemyss served as a staff officer, assisting with the Attack Teacher tactical training simulator and analysing submarine exercises at Port Bannatyne, Scotland. He afterwards served aboard the submarine Tabard, based out of Londonderry, Northern Ireland. Wemyss passed the Submarine Command Course (known as "the perisher") in 1956 and was appointed to command HMS Sentinel, based out of Malta, at an unusually young age. He was promoted to lieutenant commander on 16 February 1958.

Wemyss served on the submarine desk at the Naval Intelligence Division from 1958 to 1960. He afterwards commanded the submarine Alliance which had been modified for covert surveillance of Soviet Navy exercises.

Wemyss was promoted to commander on 30 June 1961. By this time he was one of the navy's most experienced submariners. He was appointed to command the Submarine Command Course in 1961, holding the position until 1963. He ran three 15-week courses three times a year in that time. Under his direction instructors held trainees to a higher standard. The course's difficulty led its nickname (derived from its association with the periscope) to become associated with its difficulty and high failure rate. Wemyss remarked on students' attitudes: "if he could establish his own confidence and relax, he would pass with a smile. If he could not cope, his confidence would ebb away, and he would fail himself—and be glad that he would not be required to bear the responsibility for a submarine and the people in it. Only once did I have to tell an individual that he was not suitable when he thought otherwise".

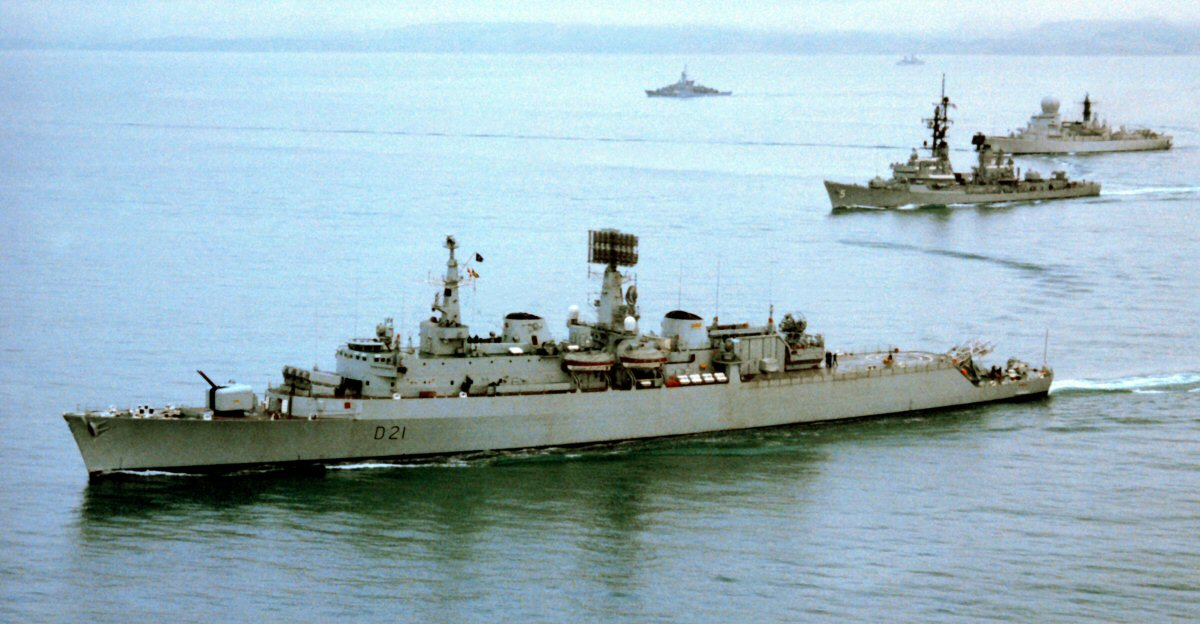
HMS Norfolk

From 1963 to 1965 Wemyss served on the Directorate of Naval Plans of the Admiralty Naval Staff. He afterwards commanded the new frigate Cleopatra. Promoted to captain he served as an assistant to the First Sea Lord, Admiral Sir Michael Le Fanu. From 1970 Wemyss commanded the 3rd Submarine Squadron, based in Faslane, Scotland. He oversaw the introduction of nuclear-powered hunter-killer submarines to the squadron. Wemyss afterwards commanded the destroyer Norfolk on trials with Exocet missile launchers off Toulon, France.

Wemyss had since divorced Ann and in 1973 married Elizabeth Alexander, with whom he would have another son and daughter. In 1974 Wemyss was appointed director of naval warfare at the Ministry of Defence, with responsibility for developing new systems and tactics. He was appointed aide-de-camp to Elizabeth II on 7 July 1976, holding the position for the next six months.

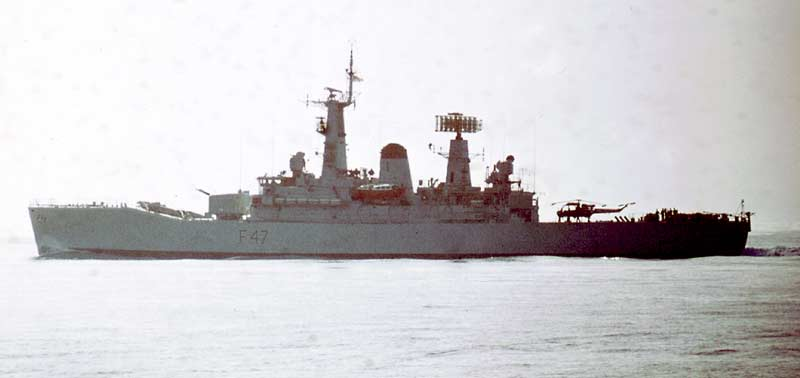
HMS Danae

Wemyss was promoted to rear admiral on 7 January 1977, reaching flag rank relatively early in his career. From 1977 to 1978 he was Flag Officer, Second Flotilla, serving on deployments to the Far East and the Atlantic. In 1977 he ordered an enquiry after it was discovered the escaped train robber Ronnie Biggs had been brought aboard the frigate Danae by sailors on shore leave in Brazil.

Wemyss was appointed Assistant Chief of the Naval Staff (Operations and Air) in 1979, though he viewed this as a sideways promotion. He was appointed a Companion of the Order of the Bath in the 1981 New Year Honours. Claiming to be bored in his role Wemyss retired from the navy on 4 April 1981.

== Later life ==
In 1981 Wemyss became clerk to the Worshipful Company of Brewers, he left the position "under a cloud" in 1991. In 1982 he was interviewed, alongside Air Vice Marshal Stewart Menaul and Lieutenant-Colonel Colin Mitchell, on Thames Television's TV Eye current affairs programme about a military response to the Argentine invasion of the Falklands. Wemyss advocated a quick, "brutal" and "bloodless" operation landing "the best of our people in very soon"; he thought that the Argentine conscripts would surrender when confronted with force. In the event this was a serious underestimate of the threat posed by the Argentinian forces in the Falklands War.

Wemyss' nickname of "Whisky" came from his fondness for the drink during his navy career. In 2022 he self-published a memoir, A Cold War Sailor. He died on 10 September 2022.
