= Assistant Chief of the Naval Staff (United Kingdom) =

Senior appointment in the Royal Navy

- Ensign of the Royal Navy
- Ministry of Defence
- Member of: Admiralty Board, Navy Board
- Reports to: Second Sea Lord and Deputy Chief of the Naval Staff and Fleet Commander
- Nominator: Secretary of State for Defence
- Appointer: Prime Minister; Subject to formal approval by the King-in-Council
- Term length: Not fixed (typically 1–3 years)
- Inaugural holder: Alexander Duff
- Formation: 1917

The Assistant Chief of the Naval Staff (A.C.N.S.) is a senior appointment in the Royal Navy usually a two-star rank and has a NATO ranking code of OF-7.

== History ==
The Assistant Chief of the Naval Staff was originally directly responsible to the First Sea Lord for non-operational divisions of the Admiralty Naval Staff, and held a position on the Board of Admiralty. The position was created in 1917 as one of two deputies with Board Status to whom the First Sea Lord delegated responsibility for the running of the Naval Staff. The position still exists today on the Admiralty Board which directs the Royal Navy.

Rear-Admiral Alexander Duff was appointed the first Assistant Chief of Naval Staff on 31 May 1917. The duties of the Assistant Chief of Naval Staff, shared with the First Sea Lord and Chief of Naval Staff and the Deputy Chief of the Naval Staff.

The Assistant Chief of Naval Staff Continued in this capacity until 1941 when the office of the Vice Chief of Naval Staff was created they then supported that flag officer until 1985 when that post was abolished. During World war Two the combined responsibilities of the Assistant Chief Naval Staff were divided up with the creation of new Assistant Chiefs of the Naval Staff responsible for specific areas such as Home (Waters) and Foreign Commands, Trade, Operations and Air. However the ACNS remained responsible for Policy.

Additional Assistant Chiefs of Naval Staff

In April 2012, Rear Admiral Matt Parr's post as Assistant Chief of the Naval Staff was re-designated Assistant Chief of the Naval Staff (Policy) and the former Chiefs of Staff responsible for Capability, Support, Aviation & Carriers and Personnel were also re-designated Assistant Chiefs of the Naval Staff.

In the 2010-2024 timeframe the posts of Assistant Chief of the Naval Staff (Aviation, Amphibious Capability and Carriers) and Assistant Chief of the Naval Staff (Submarines), as well as Assistant Chief of the Naval Staff (Policy), Assistant Chief of the Naval Staff (Personnel), Assistant Chief of Naval Staff (Ships), Assistant Chief of Naval Staff (Support), and Assistant Chief of Naval Staff (Capability) existed.

By 2025-26 the single ACNS worked in Whitehall as the 1SL's coordinator and director of policy there, with the First and Second Sea Lords at Portsmouth aboard Excellent.

Note: The more Senior Vice Chief of the Naval Staff created in 1941 was abolished in 1985.

== Duties ==
Notes: The Naval Staff runs the navy's operations and wartime strategy, and has a number of separate divisions, departments concerned with strategy and tactics, the planning and conduct of operations, and the collection and dissemination of intelligence.

From 1917 to 1945

1. In Operations of War: Deal with all the large questions of naval policy and maritime warfare.
2. Ensure the fighting and sea-going efficiency of the fleet and its organisation.
3. Distribution and Movements of all Ships in Commission and in Reserve.
4. Superintendence of the naval staff.
5. Superintendence of the Hydrographic Department.
6. Administer all naval communications.

Post 1945

1. The Assistant Chief of the Naval Staff's primary aim to: Lead the naval staff effort to drive forward naval policy for the Navy.
2. Act as the First Sea Lord's Chief Executive and on his behalf
3. Direct the implementation of Admiralty Board and Service Executive Committee (Navy Board) policy
4. Provide a high level guidance and prioritisation needed by the Naval Commands to deliver their military outputs.
5. Superintendence of the naval staff.

Post 2010

Individual duties for Assistant Chiefs of the Naval Staff (Specialized Areas).

- (A. C. N. S.) Aviation and Carriers — Responsible for delivering aviation Force Elements at Readiness (including all Royal Navy fixed and rotary wing assets, and the two Naval Air Stations) in accordance with the Royal Navy plan and arising, contingent events. On behalf of Fleet Commander.
- (A. C. N. S.) Capability — Chairman of the Maritime Capability Board responsible for planning and delivery of the majority of future Maritime capabilities on behalf of the First Sea Lord. He works closely with FD(N), ACNS (Support), ACNS (Aviation and Carriers), and Head Office Di.
- (A. C. N. S.) Personnel — Responsible for the sustainable delivery of sufficient, capable and motivated personnel to the Naval Service in support of Defence Outcomes. The Admiral is accountable for all aspects (non-operational) of Personnel within the Naval Service. As Nav Sec.
- (A. C. N. S.) Support — ACNS(Spt) (supported by ACNS(A&C) for AV/CS) is responsible to the Fleet Commander for the integrated Force Generation of all RN/RM forces and units across all DLODs as directed by the resourced Command Plan and agreed with Operational Commanders.

== Assistant Chief of the Naval Staff ==
Assistant Chiefs included:

- Rear-Admiral Sir Alexander Duff, — (May 1917–August 1919), acting ACNS from 1917- January 1918
- Rear-Admiral James Fergusson, — (August 1919–February 1920)
- Rear-Admiral Sir Ernle Chatfield, — (February 1920–September 1922)
- Rear-Admiral Cyril Fuller, — (September 1922–May 1923)
- Rear-Admiral Arthur Waistell, — (May 1923–October 1924)
- Rear-Admiral Frederic Charles Dreyer, — (October 1924–April 1927)
- Rear-Admiral Dudley Pound, — (April 1927–April 1929)
- Rear-Admiral Wilfred Tomkinson, — (April 1929–May 1931)
- Rear-Admiral John Knowles Im Thurn, — (May 1931–February 1933)
- Rear-Admiral Sidney Bailey, — (February 1933–July 1934)
- Rear-Admiral Charles Kennedy-Purvis, — (July 1934–October 1936)
- Rear-Admiral John Cunningham, — (October 1936-August 1937)
- Rear-Admiral Lancelot E. Holland, — (August 1937–January 1939)
- Rear-Admiral Harold Burrough, — (January 1939–September 1940)

Note: From 1940 to 1946 split into separate specific areas of responsibility see: ACNS Home, Foreign, U-Boat and Trade, Weapons, Air and Operations

== Assistant Chief of the Naval Staff (Operations) ==
Note: Changed back to Assistant Chief Naval Staff

== Assistant Chief of the Naval Staff ==
- Rear-Admiral Geoffrey Oliver, — (December 1946–August 1948)
- Rear-Admiral Ralph Edwards, — (August 1948–February 1951)
- Rear-Admiral Eric Clifford, — (February 1951–June 1952)
- Rear-Admiral Robert Elkins, — (June 1952–August 1954)
- Rear-Admiral Michael Goodenough, — (August 1954-January 1956)
- Rear-Admiral Royston Wright, — (January 1956–February 1958)
- Rear-Admiral Desmond Dreyer, — (February 1958–November 1959)
- Rear-Admiral Antony Cole, — (November 1959–February 1962)
- Rear-Admiral Peter Hill-Norton, — (February 1962-March 1964)
- Rear-Admiral Michael Pollock, — (March 1964–April 1966)

Note:Changed to Assistant Chief of Naval Staff - Policy until 1984

== Assistant Chief of the Naval Staff (Policy) ==
- Rear-Admiral John Adams, — (April 1966–January 1968)
- Rear-Admiral Terence Lewin, — (January 1968–June 1969)
- Rear-Admiral Ian Easton, — (June 1969–April 1971)
- Rear-Admiral Henry Leach, — (April 1971–November 1973)
- Rear-Admiral Peter Berger, — (November 1973–December 1975)
- Rear-Admiral Michael Stacey, — (December 1975–July 1976)
- Rear-Admiral Bryan Straker, — (July 1976–June 1978)
- Rear-Admiral James Kennon, — (June 1978–December 1979)
- Rear-Admiral Derek Reffell, — (December 1979–December 1981)
- Rear-Admiral Geoffrey Dalton, — (December 1981–October 1984)

Note: Changed back to Assistant Chief of Naval Staff

== Assistant Chief of the Naval Staff ==
- Rear-Admiral Jeremy Black, — (October 1984–July 1986)
- Rear-Admiral Michael Livesay, — (July 1986–December 1988)
- Rear-Admiral Hugo White, – (December 1988–February 1991)
- Rear-Admiral Peter Abbott, — (February 1991–September 1993)
- Rear-Admiral John Brigstocke, — (September 1993–March 1995)
- Rear-Admiral Jeremy Blackman, – (March 1995–May 1997)
- Rear-Admiral Jonathan Band, — (May 1997–December 1999)
- Rear-Admiral James Burnell-Nugent, — (December 1999–April 2001)
- Rear-Admiral Timothy McClement, —(April 2001–May 2003)
- Rear-Admiral Adrian Johns:, — (May 2003–July 2005)
- Rear-Admiral Alan Massey, — (July 2005–February 2008)
- Rear-Admiral Robert Cooling, — (February 2008–June 2009)
- Rear-Admiral Philip Jones, — (June 2009–December 2011)

Note: Changed back to Assistant Chief of Naval Staff -Policy

== Assistant Chief of the Naval Staff (Policy) ==
On behalf of the First Sea Lord and through the Admiralty and Navy Boards, ACNS (Pol) is responsible for the direction and development of strategic policy and strategy for the Royal Navy.

- Rear-Admiral Matt Parr — (January 2012–May 2013)
- Rear-Admiral Clive Johnstone — (May 2013–September 2015)
- Rear-Admiral Nick Hine — (September 2015–January 2019)
- Major-General Gwyn Jenkins — (January 2019–September 2020)
- Rear-Admiral Iain Lower — (September 2020–December 2022)
- Rear-Admiral Anthony Rimington — (December 2022–March 2024)
- Major-General Duncan Forbes — (March 2024–February 2025)
- Major-General Paul Maynard — (February 2025–present)

Note: This post is also known as Director Strategy and Policy.

== Naval Assistants to the Assistant Chief of Naval Staff ==
Staff officers would normally be supported by a Naval Assistant and a Personal Secretary usually they would be either a Lieutenant commander, Commander or a Captain.

== Additional Assistant Chiefs of the Naval Staff (specialized areas) ==
=== Assistant Chief of the Naval Staff (Warfare) ===
- Rear-Admiral Geoffrey Barnard, October 1952-January 1953
- Rear-Admiral Arthur Pedder, — (January 1953–October 1954)
- Rear-Admiral William John Yendell, — (October 1954–July 1957)
- Rear-Admiral Henry Rolfe, — (July 1957–June 1960)
- Rear-Admiral Maurice Ross, — (June 1960–October 1963)
- Rear-Admiral John G. B. Cooke, — (October 1963–March 1966)
- Rear-Admiral Anthony Griffin, — (March 1966–May 1968)

Note:Post Abolished 1968 changed to ACNS Operational Requirements

=== Assistant Chief of the Naval Staff (Operations and Air) ===
- Rear-Admiral Derek Empson, — (July 1968–July 1969)
- Rear-Admiral Douglas Parker, — (July 1969–June 1971)
- Rear-Admiral Peter Austin, — (June 1971–June 1973)
- Rear-Admiral James Dunbar Cook, — (June 1973–February 1975)
- Rear-Admiral Peter Branson, — (February 1975–February 1977)
- Rear-Admiral John Gerard-Pearse, — (February 1977–January 1979)
- Rear-Admiral Martin La Touche-Wemyss, — (January 1979–January 1981)
- Rear-Admiral Anthony Whetstone, — (January 1981–April 1983)
- Rear-Admiral Linley Middleton, — (April 1983–July 1984)
- Rear-Admiral Kenneth Snow, — (July–October 1984)

Note: Post abolished 1984

=== Assistant Chief of the Naval Staff (Operational Requirements) ===
- Rear-Admiral Rae McKaig, — (May 1968–October 1970)
- Rear-Admiral Philip Higham, — (October 1970-October 1972)
- Rear-Admiral James Jungius, — (October 1972–November 1974)
- Rear-Admiral Alan G. Watson, — (November 1974–November 1976)
- Rear-Admiral Stephen Berthon, — (November 1976-February 1978)
- Rear-Admiral Simon Cassels, — (February 1978–December 1980)
- Rear-Admiral Peter Stanford, — (December 1980–September 1982)
- Rear-Admiral Geoffrey G. W. Marsh, — (September 1982–May 1984)
- Rear-Admiral John Kerr, — (September 1984–January 1985)

Note: Post abolished 1985

=== Assistant Chief of the Naval Staff (Ships and Submarines) ===
- Rear-Admiral Alexander J. Burton, — (October 2014–July 2015)

Note:Changed to ACNS (Submarines)

=== Assistant Chief of the Naval Staff (Ships) ===
Responsible for ensuring that DD/FF, SSN, SSBN, MW and HM vessels are generated fit for task through integration of all the Lines of Development.

- Rear Admiral Christopher Gardner — (2017–2019)
- Rear Admiral Jim Higham — (2019–2020)

=== Assistant Chief of the Naval Staff (Submarines) ===
- Rear-Admiral John Weale, — (July 2015–May 2020)
- Commodore Robert Anstey, — (March 2020 – Present), interim

=== Assistant Chief of the Naval Staff (Support) ===
- Rear-Admiral Peter Hudson, — (December 2011–February 2013)
- Rear-Admiral Ian Jess, — (March 2013–April 2015)
- Rear-Admiral Richard Stokes, — (April 2015–January 2018)

Note: This post was renamed as Director Naval Support (DNS).

=== Assistant Chief of the Naval Staff (Training) ===
- Rear-Admiral Benjamin Key, — (2014–2015)
- Rear-Admiral John Clink, — (July 2016 – 2017 )
- Rear-Admiral William Warrender, — (2017–2019)

Note: This post was reassigned to Commander Fleet Operational Sea Training.

=== Assistant Chief of the Naval Staff (People & Transformation) ===
- Rear-Admiral Philip Hally — (2019–2021)
- Rear-Admiral Jude Terry — (2021–Present)

Note: This post is also known as Director People & Training.

== See also ==
- Deputy Chief of the Naval Staff
- Vice Chief of the Naval Staff
- First Sea Lord
- Second Sea Lord
- Third Sea Lord
- Fourth Sea Lord
- Fifth Sea Lord

== Attribution ==
Primary source for this article is by Harley Simon, Lovell Tony, (2017), Assistant Chief of Naval Staff, dreadnoughtproject.org, http://www.dreadnoughtproject.org.

== Sources ==
- http://www.gulabin.com/Royal Navy - Senior Appointments
