= Anthony Whetstone =

Royal Navy Rear Admiral (1927–2022)

Rear-Admiral Anthony Whetstone CB
- Born: Anthony John Whetstone; 12 June 1927; Coventry, England
- Died: 19 December 2022 (aged 95)
- Spouse: Betty Georgeson (m. 1951; died 2016)
- Military career
- Allegiance: United Kingdom
- Branch: Royal Navy
- Rank: Rear-Admiral
- Commands: HMS Sea Scout; HMS Artful; HMS Repulse; HMS Juno; HMS Norfolk
- Conflicts: Falklands War
- Awards: Companion of the Order of the Bath

Rear-Admiral Anthony John Whetstone CB (12 June 1927 – 19 December 2022) was a British Royal Navy officer who served as Flag Officer Sea Training.

== Early life ==
Anthony John Whetstone was born on 12 June 1927 in Coventry. He was educated at King Henry VIII School, Coventry.

== Naval career ==
He joined the Royal Navy in 1945. He was given command of the submarine HMS Sea Scout in 1956, the submarine HMS Artful in 1959 and the submarine HMS Repulse in 1968. He went on to be commanding officer of the frigate HMS Juno in 1972, commanding officer of the destroyer HMS Norfolk in 1977 and Flag Officer Sea Training in 1980. He went on, in 1981, to be Assistant Chief of the Naval Staff (Operations), a role he undertook during the Falklands War, before retiring in 1983.

Whetstone was appointed a Companion of the Order of the Bath for services in the Falklands War in October 1982.

== Personal life and death ==
In 1951, Whetstone married Betty Georgeson. She died in 2016. He died on 19 December 2022, at the age of 95.

Military offices
| Preceded by Gwynedd Pritchard | Flag Officer Sea Training; 1978–1980 | Succeeded by David Eckersley-Maslin |
