= List of senior officers of the Royal Navy =

This is a list of senior officers of the Royal Navy (or more precisely a list of lists of the holders of certain senior positions in the Royal Navy).

== Lord Admirals of England 1385 –1628, 1638 –1708 ==
See Lord High Admirals

== Lord High Admirals of Great Britain 1708 – 1709 ==
See Lord High Admirals

== Lord High Admirals of the United Kingdom 1827 –1828, 1964 –present ==
See Lord High Admirals

== Vice Admirals of England 1410 – 1707 ==
See Vice-Admiral of England

== Vice Admirals of Great Britain 1707 – 1801 ==
See Vice-Admiral of Great Britain

== Vice Admirals of the United Kingdom 1801 – present ==
See Vice-Admiral of the United Kingdom

== Rear Admirals of England 1683 – 1707 ==
See Rear-Admiral of England

== Rear Admirals of Great Britain 1707 – 1801 ==
See Rear-Admiral of Great Britain

== Rear Admirals of the United Kingdom 1801 – 2007 ==
See Rear-Admiral of the United Kingdom

== Vice Admirals of the Coast of Great Britain and Ireland 1536 to 19th c. ==
See Vice-Admiral of the Coast.

== First Lords of the Admiralty, 1628– present ==
See First Lord of the Admiralty

== Admirals of the South, North and West, 1360-1369 ==
See Admiral of the South, North and West

== Admirals of the Fleet, 1690–present ==
See Admiral of the Fleet

== Senior Naval Lord, 1689–1771 ==
See First Sea Lord

== First Naval Lords, 1771–1904 ==
See First Sea Lord

== First Sea Lord, 1904–1917 ==
See First Sea Lord

== First Sea Lords and Chiefs of the Naval Staff, 1917–present ==
See First Sea Lord and Chief of Naval Staff

== Deputy First Sea Lords 1917 to 1946 ==
See: Deputy First Sea Lord

== Commander-in-Chief Fleet, 1971–2012 ==
See Commander-in-Chief Fleet

== Fleet Commander, 2012–present ==
See Fleet Commander

== Second Naval Lords, 1830–1904 ==
See Second Naval Lord

== Second Sea Lords, 1904–1995 ==
See Second Sea Lord

== Second Sea Lords and Commanders-in-Chief Naval Home Command, 1995–2012 ==
See Second Sea Lord and Commander-in-Chief Naval Home Command

== Second Sea Lords and Chiefs of Naval Personnel and Training, 2012–2015 ==
See Second Sea Lord and Chief of Naval Personnel and Training

== Second Sea Lord and Deputy Chief of the Naval Staff, 2015–present ==
See Second Sea Lord and Deputy Chief of Naval Staff

== Third Naval Lords 1832–1868 ==
See Third Naval Lord

== Third Naval Lords and Controllers of the Navy 1869–1872, 1882-1904 ==
See Third Naval Lord and Controller of the Navy

== Controllers of the Navy, 1872-1882, 1917-1918, 1965–present ==
See Controller of the Navy

== Third Sea Lord and Controllers of the Navy 1904–1912, 1918-1965 ==
See Third Sea Lord and Controller of the Navy

== Third Sea Lord, 1912-1918 ==
See Third Sea Lord

== Fourth Naval Lords 1830–1868 ==
See Fourth Naval Lord

== Junior Naval Lords 1868-1904 ==
See Junior Naval Lord

== Fourth Sea Lords 1904–1964 ==
See Fourth Sea Lord

== Chiefs of Fleet Support 1964–2007 ==
See Chief of Fleet Support

== Chiefs of Materiel (Fleet)/Chief of Fleet (Support) 2007 – present ==
See Chief of Materiel (Fleet)/Chief of Fleet (Support)

== Fifth Sea Lords and Chief of Naval Air Service 1917–1918 ==
See Fifth Sea Lord and Chief of Naval Air Service

== Fifth Sea Lords 1938–1956 ==
See Fifth Sea Lord

== Fifth Sea Lords and Deputy Chiefs of the Naval Staff 1957–1965 ==
See Fifth Sea Lord and Deputy Chief of the Naval Staff

== Deputy Chiefs of the Naval Staff ==
See Deputy Chief of the Naval Staff

== Vice Chiefs of the Naval Staff ==
See Vice Chief of the Naval Staff

== Assistant Chiefs of the Naval Staff ==
See Assistant Chief of the Naval Staff
