= Gwyn Jenkins =

Royal Marines general

General Sir Gwyn Jenkins KCB OBE ADC
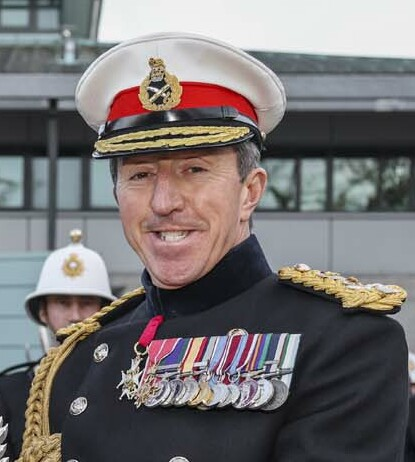
- Jenkins in 2022
- Military career
- Allegiance: United Kingdom
- Branch: Royal Marines
- Service years: 1990–present
- Rank: General
- Commands: First Sea Lord; Commandant General Royal Marines; Vice-Chief of the Defence Staff; 3 Commando Brigade; Special Boat Service
- Conflicts: The Troubles; International Force East Timor; War in Afghanistan; Iraq War
- Awards: Knight Commander of the Order of the Bath; Officer of the Order of the British Empire

General Sir Gwyn Jenkins, KCB, OBE, ADC is a senior Royal Marines officer. He was appointed First Sea Lord and Chief of the Naval Staff on 15 May 2025, becoming the first Marine to hold the office.

He served as Vice-Chief of the Defence Staff from August 2022 to June 2024. He was concurrently appointed Commandant General Royal Marines in November 2022.

== Early life and education ==
Jenkins was educated at Malmesbury School.

== Military career ==
=== Early career ===
Jenkins was commissioned into the Royal Marines in 1990. He spent time as a junior officer in the Commando Logistics Regiment and on operations in Northern Ireland with 42 Commando.

In 2004, he graduated from the Military College Shrivenham, where he completed a master's degree in defence studies.

He became commanding officer of the Special Boat Service in 2009.

Jenkins was promoted from acting to full colonel on 1 July 2011. In 2011, Jenkins received a written report stating that members of the Army's Special Air Service (SAS), soldiers who were not under his command, had conducted extrajudicial killings in Afghanistan. He referred the matter to his superior officer, the Director Special Forces, but failed to report it to military police, instead placing the report in a safe in April 2011. In October 2011, Jenkins deployed to Afghanistan as the commander of all British Special Forces in the country.

He was appointed Officer of the Order of the British Empire "in recognition of gallant and distinguished services in Afghanistan during the period 1 October 2011 to 31 March 2012".

In 2012, Jenkins was appointed military assistant to the prime minister. On 1 July 2015, he was promoted from acting to full brigadier. He went on to become Deputy National Security Adviser for Conflict, Stability and Defence in 2016, commander 3 Commando Brigade in 2017, and Assistant Chief of the Naval Staff (Policy) in 2019. From 2021 to 2022, he served as Director Special Forces. Jenkins was appointed a Companion of the Order of the Bath in the 2021 New Year Honours.

=== As a general ===
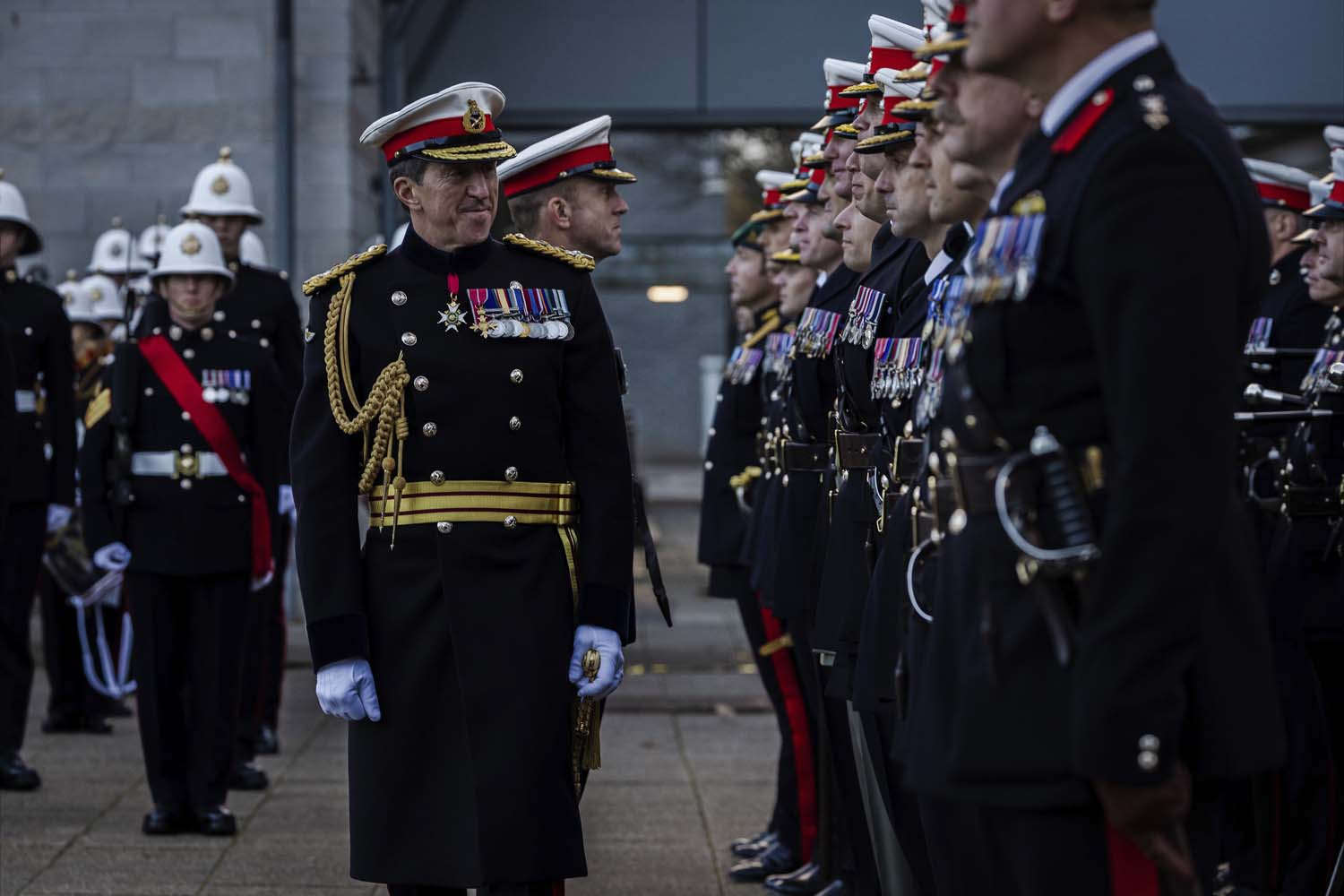
Jenkins inspecting his first parade as Commandant General Royal Marines in November 2022

Jenkins was promoted to general on 30 August 2022, skipping the rank of lieutenant general, and took up the post of Vice-Chief of the Defence Staff. He is the first Royal Marine full general since 2016, after Sir Gordon Messenger, and the second since 1977. At the same time he was made an aide-de-camp to Queen Elizabeth II. Jenkins also became Commandant General Royal Marines on 25 November, succeeding Lieutenant General Sir Robert Magowan. Jenkins became the first full general to serve as Commandant General since the 1970s.

On 23 April 2024, the prime minister, Rishi Sunak, announced that Jenkins would become the United Kingdom's next National Security Adviser. However, on 26 August 2024, The Guardian reported that the appointment had been cancelled by new prime minister Sir Keir Starmer. Jenkins was appointed Knight Commander of the Order of the Bath in the 2025 New Year Honours.

In May 2025, an investigation carried out by the BBC's Panorama revealed that a Special Forces officer appointed by Jenkins personally rejected 1,585 UK resettlement applications from Afghan army personnel who had served with the SAS. It was claimed that the officer instructed civil service caseworkers to reject the applications on spurious grounds. This was controversial because in the UK they could have been called as witnesses to the public inquiry into the extrajudicial killings, but the inquiry has no power to compel testimony from foreign nationals who are overseas.

In May 2025, Jenkins was appointed First Sea Lord and Chief of the Naval Staff. He is the first Royal Marine to hold this role.

In July 2025, The Daily Telegraph reported that Jenkins "was at the heart of a national security incident" when a Royal Marine under his command made an accidental data breach in February 2022 revealing details of 25,000 Afghans who had applied to be resettled in Britain, which led to the Afghan Response Route classified immigration programme intended to relocate affected Afghans. The Daily Telegraph reported that "Downing Street blocked news reports" about this coming out, and cancelled his already announced appointment as National Security Adviser to the prime minister, and instead promoted him to First Sea Lord.

Military offices
Preceded by Nick Hine	Assistant Chief of the Naval Staff (Policy); 2019–2020	Succeeded by Iain Lower
Preceded by Sir Roland Walker	Director Special Forces; 2021–2022	Succeeded by Nick Perry
Preceded by Sir Tim Fraser	Vice-Chief of the Defence Staff; 2022–2024	Succeeded by Dame Sharon Nesmith
Preceded by Sir Robert Magowan	Commandant General Royal Marines; 2022–present	Incumbent
Preceded by Sir Ben Key	First Sea Lord and Chief of the Naval Staff; 2025–present	Incumbent
