= Paul Maynard (Royal Marines officer) =

British general

Major General Paul Maynard OBE
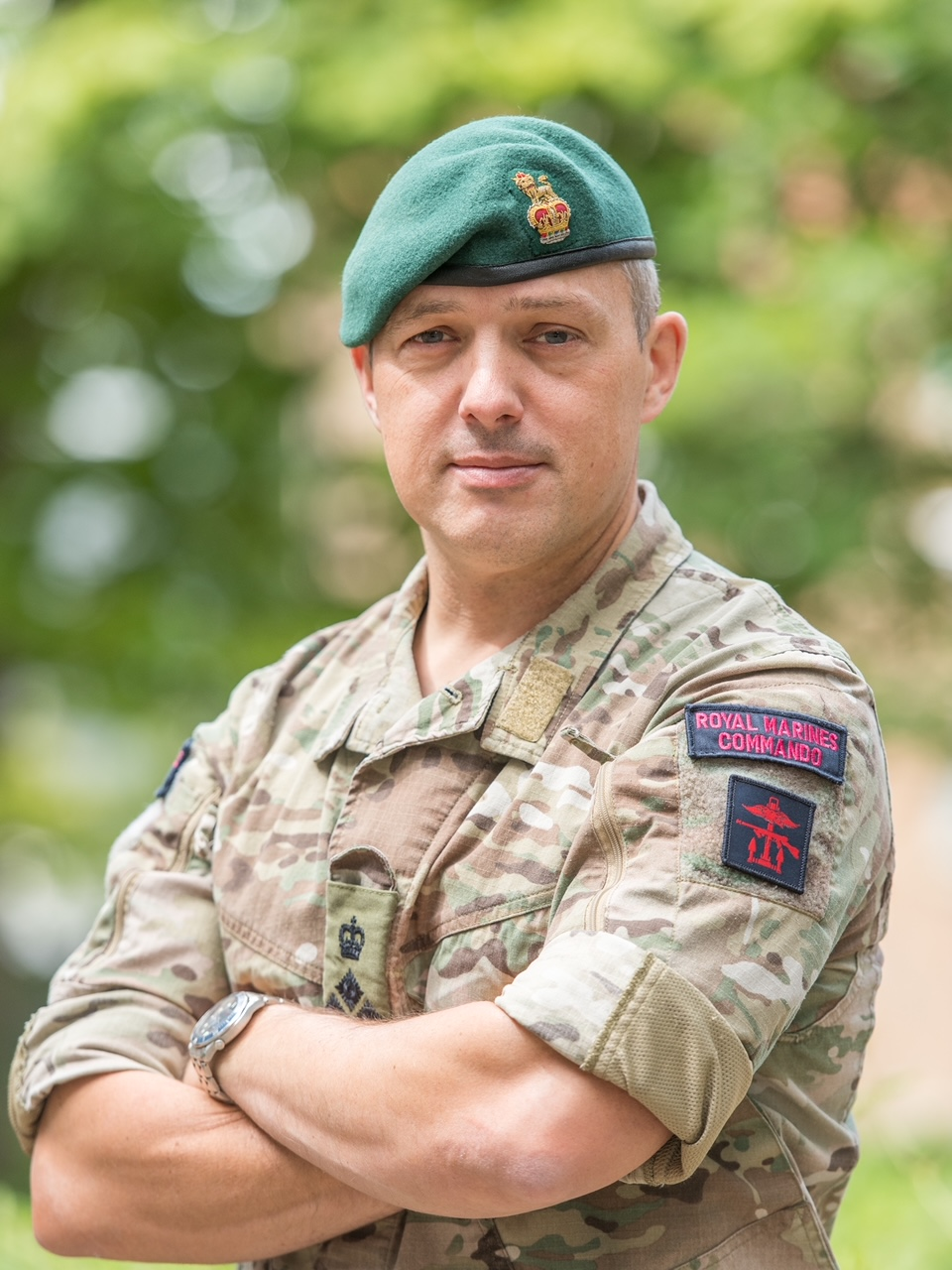
- Maynard in July 2023
- Military career
- Allegiance: United Kingdom
- Branch: Royal Marines
- Service years: 1999–present
- Rank: Major-General
- Commands: 40 Commando; Commander Littoral Strike Group; Chief of Joint Force Operations
- Conflicts: Iraq War; War in Afghanistan
- Awards: Officer of the Order of the British Empire

Major-General Paul Andrew Maynard OBE is a senior Royal Marines officer. He has served as Assistant Chief of the Naval Staff (Policy) from February 2025.

== Military career ==
Maynard joined the Royal Marines in September 1999 and became commanding officer of 40 Commando in 2017. He was appointed an Officer of the Order of the British Empire in the 2020 New Year Honours. He became Commander Littoral Strike Group on 11 July 2022, with the rank of brigadier, then Chief of Joint Force Operations in July 2023 and Assistant Chief of the Naval Staff (Policy) in February 2025, with promotion to major-general on 26 March 2025.

Military offices
Preceded by Duncan Forbes	Assistant Chief of the Naval Staff (Policy); 2025–present	Incumbent
