= Tony Hutton =

Royal Navy officer

Captain Tony Hutton OBE
- Lieutenant Commander Tony Hutton
- Born: 1 September 1932; Chislehurst, Kent
- Died: 5 April 2015 (aged 82)
- Relatives: Rear Admiral Reginald Hutton (father)
- Military career
- Allegiance: United Kingdom
- Branch: Royal Navy
- Service years: 1945–1985
- Rank: Captain
- Commands: HMS Newcastle (1982–84); HMS Norfolk (1978–80); HMS Leopard (1968–70)
- Conflicts: United Nations Peacekeeping Force in Cyprus
- Awards: OBE

Captain Anthony David Hutton OBE (1 September 1932 – 5 April 2015) was a British Royal Navy officer of the post-Second World War era who organised the evacuation of about 2500 British and Cypriot refugees during the Turkish invasion of Cyprus in 1974.

Hutton was born in Chislehurst, Kent, the son of Rear Admiral Reginald Hutton, who had participated in the Battle of Jutland during the First World War and had been awarded the Distinguished Service Order and two bars during the Second World War.

Hutton was educated at Dartmouth Royal Naval College.

While Hutton was in command of HMS Norfolk, a Court-Martial was held aboard the ship during her visit to Fremantle, Western Australia, being the first court martial held aboard a Royal Navy warship for over ten years. The visit was to commemorate 150 years of the founding of Western Australia.

Hutton was appointed an Officer of the Order of the British Empire (OBE) in the 1975 New Year Honours.
