= Iain Lower =

Royal Navy Rear Admiral

Rear Admiral Iain Lower CB
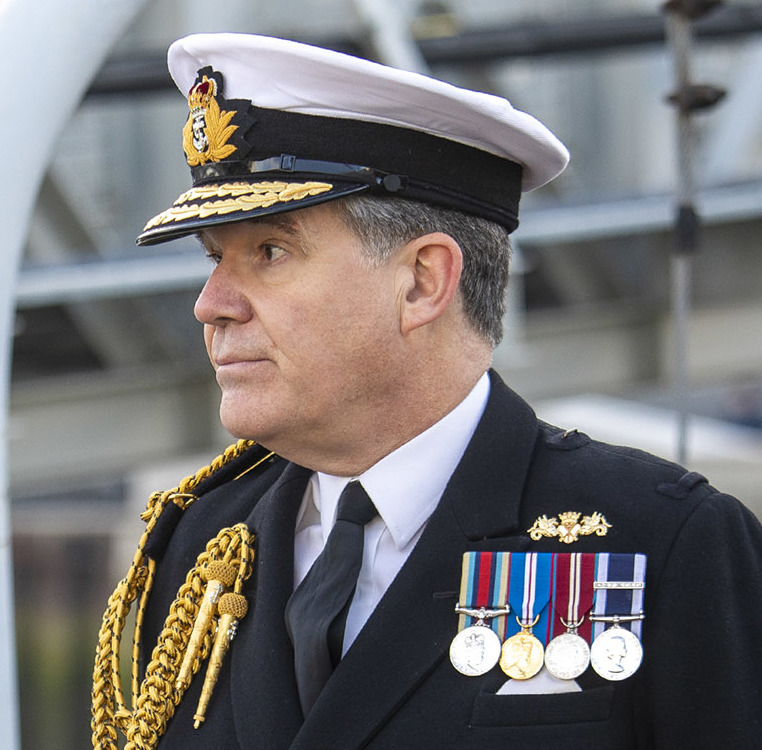
- Rear Admiral Lower in 2020
- Military career
- Allegiance: United Kingdom
- Branch: Royal Navy
- Service years: 1992–2022
- Rank: Rear Admiral
- Commands: HMS Dragon; HMS Gloucester
- Conflicts: War in Afghanistan
- Awards: Companion of the Order of the Bath
- Other work: Deputy Master Trinity House

Rear Admiral Iain Stuart Lower, CB is a senior Royal Navy officer. He was Assistant Chief of the Naval Staff (Policy) 2020-2022. He is the current Deputy Master of Trinity House.

== Royal Navy career ==
Lower joined the Royal Navy on 1 May 1992. He became commanding officer of the destroyer HMS Gloucester in 2009 and, in that capacity, was deployed to the South Atlantic. He went on to become commanding officer of the destroyer HMS Dragon in 2013, Head of Military Plans for Africa and the Americas in 2014, and the Chief of the Defence Staff's personal Liaison Officer to the Chairman of the Joint Chiefs of Staff in Washington, D.C. in 2016. After that he became Director for Strategy, International Relations, Maritime Sector, Parliamentary & Academic Engagement in September 2017, and Assistant Chief of the Naval Staff (Policy) from November 2020 until November 2022, when he retired from active royal navy service.

== Commonwealth War Graves Commission ==
After leaving Royal Navy service, he worked at the Commonwealth War Graves Commission, as the Director of Strategy, Communications & Commonwealth Affairs.

== Trinity House ==
In September 2023, he was nominated to become Deputy Master of Trinity House, replacing Captain Ian McNaught. In February 2024, he took up his position as Deputy Master. He was also sworn in as Elder Brethren of the court.

== Other work ==
Lower has been a Trustee of The Seafarers' Charity since 2021.

== Honours ==
Lower was appointed a Companion of the Order of the Bath in the 2022 Birthday Honours.

Military offices
Preceded by Gwyn Jenkins	Assistant Chief of the Naval Staff (Policy); 2020–2022	Succeeded by Anthony Rimington
