= Julian Oswald =

Royal Navy Admiral of the Fleet (1933–2011)

Admiral of the Fleet Sir Julian Oswald GCB
- Admiral of the Fleet Sir Julian Oswald
- Born: 11 August 1933; Newmore, Invergordon, Ross-shire
- Died: 19 July 2011 (aged 77); Shedfield, Hampshire
- Military career
- Allegiance: United Kingdom
- Branch: Royal Navy
- Service years: 1947–1993
- Rank: Admiral of the Fleet
- Commands: First Sea Lord; Commander-in-Chief; Britannia Royal Naval College; HMS Newcastle; HMS Bacchante; HMS Yarnton
- Conflicts: Cold War; Falklands War
- Awards: Knight Grand Cross of the Order of the Bath

Admiral of the Fleet Sir John Julian Robertson Oswald GCB (11 August 1933 – 19 July 2011) was a senior Royal Navy officer. After training as a gunnery specialist, Oswald commanded a frigate and then a destroyer before achieving higher command in the navy. He served as First Sea Lord and Chief of Naval Staff in the early 1990s. In that capacity he advised the British Government on the reduction in the size of the fleet under the Options for Change restructuring programme and on the deployment of Naval Support for the Gulf War in 1991: he also made the decision that members of the Women's Royal Naval Service should be allowed to serve in Royal Navy ships.

== Naval career ==
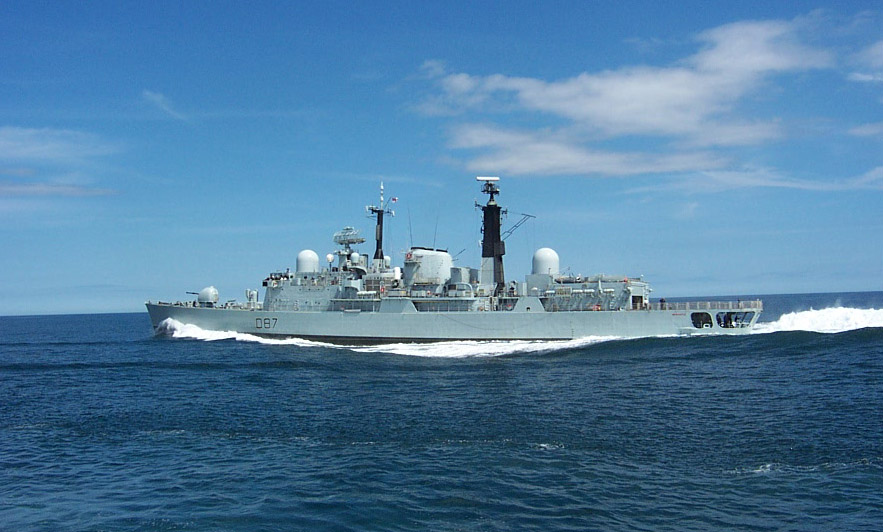
The destroyer HMS Newcastle which Oswald commanded in the late 1970s

Oswald was born to Captain George Hamilton Oswald, RN and his wife Margaret Elliott Oswald (née Robertson). The Oswalds were a landed gentry family of Cavens, Dumfries and Auchincruive (now named "Oswald Hall"), South Ayrshire, Scotland, descending from merchant George Oswald, Rector of the University of Glasgow from 1797 to 1799, Oswald was educated at Beaudesert Park School and the Royal Naval College, Dartmouth. He joined the Royal Navy as a cadet on 1 May 1947. During his early career he served in the cruiser HMS Devonshire and was commissioned as a midshipman on 1 January 1952. He then served in the battleship HMS Vanguard and then the frigate HMS Verulam. Promoted to sub-lieutenant on 1 May 1953, he was posted to the aircraft carrier HMS Theseus in February 1955. Promoted to lieutenant on 1 June 1955, he subsequently served in the cruiser HMS Newfoundland and then the minesweeper HMS Jewel.

After qualifying in gunnery Oswald joined the aircraft carrier HMS Victorious in 1960. He was given command of the minesweeper HMS Yarnton in April 1962 and was promoted to lieutenant commander on 1 June 1963. After attending the Royal Navy Staff College in 1964, he was posted to the shore establishment HMS Excellent at Portsmouth as Air Weapons Officer in 1965. HMS Excellent maintains the gun carriage used for state funerals, and Oswald was the Funeral Gun Carriage Officer for the Funeral of Sir Winston Churchill on 30 January 1965. He was posted to the frigate HMS Naiad in September 1966 and promoted to commander on 31 December 1968 on his appointment to the Directorate of Naval Plans at the Ministry of Defence.

Oswald was given command of the frigate HMS Bacchante in January 1971 and then joined the staff of the Assistant Chief of the Defence Staff at the Ministry of Defence in 1972. Promoted to captain on 31 December 1973, he attended the Royal College of Defence Studies in 1976 before being given command of the destroyer HMS Newcastle in January 1977 and joining the Royal Navy Presentation Team in 1979. He went on to be Captain of the Royal Naval College, Dartmouth in June 1980. He was appointed Aide-de-Camp to the Queen on 7 July 1982 and was promoted to rear admiral on 2 September 1982 on his appointment as Assistant Chief of the Defence Staff (Programmes).

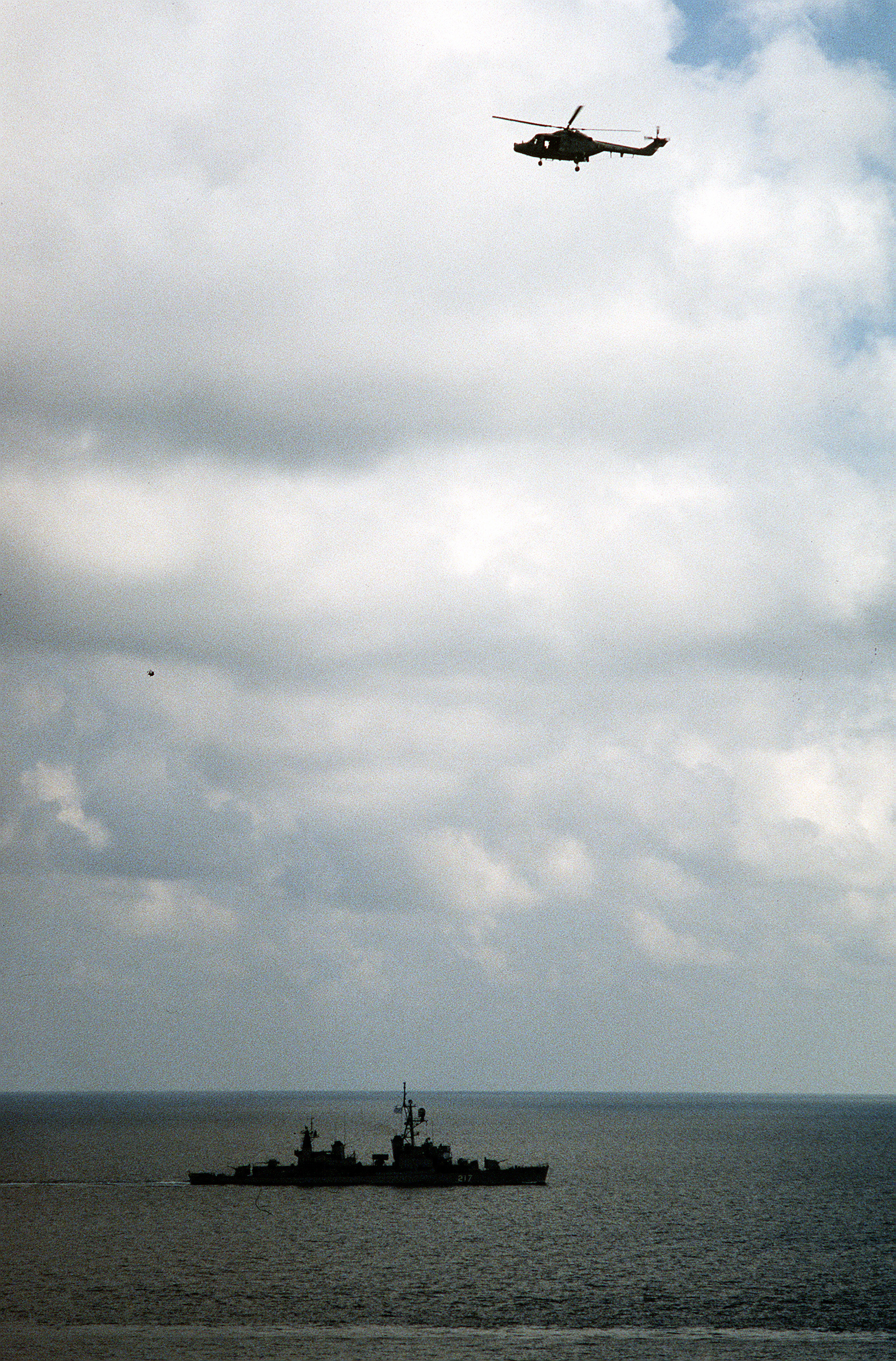
A Royal Navy Westland Lynx helicopter in action during the Gulf War

Oswald became Assistant Chief of the Defence Staff (Policy and Nuclear) in January 1985 and went on to become Flag Officer, Third Flotilla and Commander, Anti-Submarine Warfare Striking Fleet in October 1985. Promoted to vice-admiral on 3 January 1986, he was appointed a Knight Commander of the Order of the Bath in the 1987 New Year Honours. He was promoted to full admiral on 29 May 1987, on appointment as Commander-in-Chief Fleet and NATO Commander-in-Chief, Channel and Commander-in-Chief Eastern Atlantic.

Advanced to Knight Grand Cross of the Order of the Bath in the 1989 New Year Honours, Oswald became First Sea Lord and Chief of the Naval Staff in May 1989. In that capacity he advised the British Government on the reduction in the size of the fleet under the Options for Change restructuring programme and on the deployment of Naval Support for the Gulf War in 1991: he also made the decision that members of the Women's Royal Naval Service should be allowed to serve in Royal Navy ships. He was promoted to Admiral of the Fleet on his retirement in March 1993.

== Later career ==
In retirement Oswald became Chairman of Aerosystems International and of Sema Group plc, an Information Technology business, until the latter was acquired in 2001. He was also President of the Sea Cadet Association, vice-president of the Royal United Services Institute and a Trustee of the National Maritime Museum. His interests included walking, stamp-collecting, family and fishing. He died at his home at Shedfield in Hampshire on 19 July 2011.

== Family ==
In 1958 he married Veronica Thompson; they had two sons and three daughters. His nephew is the playwright Peter Oswald.

== Sources ==
- Heathcote, Tony (2002). The British Admirals of the Fleet 1734 – 1995. Pen & Sword Ltd. ISBN 0-85052-835-6.

Military offices
Preceded by Sir Nicholas Hunt	Commander-in-Chief Fleet; 1987–1989	Succeeded by Sir Benjamin Bathurst
Preceded by Sir William Staveley	First Sea Lord; 1989–1993	Succeeded by Sir Benjamin Bathurst
