= Nick Hine =

Royal Navy Vice-Admiral (born 1966)

Vice Admiral Sir Nick Hine KCB
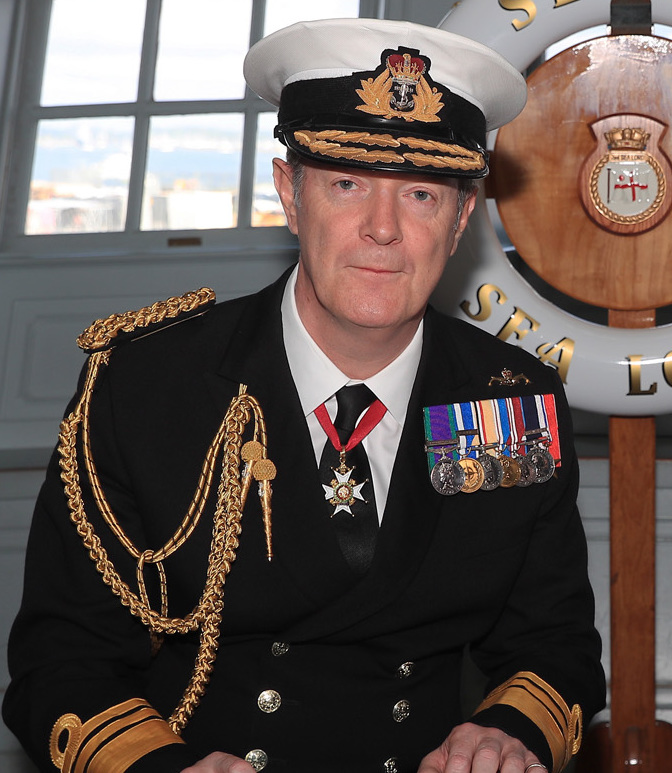
- Vice Admiral Hine in 2019
- Born: 4 February 1966 (age 60); Carlisle, England
- Military career
- Allegiance: United Kingdom
- Branch: Royal Navy
- Service years: 1985–2022
- Rank: Vice Admiral
- Commands: Second Sea Lord HMS Talent; HMS Westminster HMS Blackwater
- Conflicts: Kosovo War; Iraq War
- Awards: Knight Commander of the Order of the Bath; Bronze Star Medal (United States)

Vice Admiral Sir Nicholas William Hine, KCB (born 4 February 1966) is a retired senior Royal Navy officer. He served as Second Sea Lord from 2019 to 2022.

== Early life and education ==
Hine was born on 4 February 1966 in Carlisle, Cumberland, England. He was educated at John Taylor High School, a state school in Staffordshire. He studied at City University London (Bachelor of Science, 1989) and King's College London (Master of Arts Defence Studies, 1999).

== Naval career ==
Hine joined the Royal Navy in 1985. He served as commanding officer of HMS Blackwater from 1995 to 1997, during which he was promoted to lieutenant-commander on 1 May 1996. He then served as Executive Officer of HMS Splendid from 1999 to 2000. He was promoted to commander on 30 June 2000.

In the year 2000, at age 33, he took command of the nuclear powered submarine HMS Talent.

He became Assistant Director of the Maritime Change Programme in August 2007, and was promoted to captain on 30 June 2008. The following year he was appointed Director Iraq Maritime and Training in January 2009 and Team Leader Warfare Officers and Ratings in August 2010. He went on to be Head of Anti-Submarine Warfare and commanding officer of the frigate HMS Westminster in June 2011, conducting numerous counter piracy and drug missions in the Gulf and East Africa. Defence Policy Advisor to HM Treasury in September 2012 and Assistant Chief of the Naval Staff (Policy) in September 2015. During his time in the role he authored the Maritime Strategy 2035. He was promoted to commodore on 17 March 2014, and to rear-admiral on 1 September 2015.

Hine became Second Sea Lord on 26 April 2019, and was promoted to vice admiral. As Second Sea Lord he was responsible for the 'Navy Transformation' programme. He also chaired the Royal Navy Digital and Data Board. On 12 January 2022, Hine was succeeded by Vice Admiral Martin Connell as Second Sea Lord. He retired from the Royal Navy on 5 May 2022.

In 2015, Hine was given permission to wear the Bronze Star Medal awarded to him by the President of the United States "in recognition of meritorious, gallant and distinguished services during coalition operations in Iraq". In the 2018 Queen's Birthday Honours, he was appointed a Companion of the Order of the Bath (CB).

Hine was appointed Knight Commander of the Order of the Bath (KCB) in the 2023 New Year Honours.

== Personal life ==
Hine is married and has one daughter.

Hine was diagnosed with autism in the 2010s, and has spoken in favour of neurodiversity in the armed forces.

The 1999 BBC1 documentary "Splendid Under The Sea" followed Hine as Second in Command.

Military offices
Preceded by Clive Johnstone	Assistant Chief of the Naval Staff (Policy); 2015–2019	Succeeded by Gwyn Jenkins
Preceded by Tony Radakin	Second Sea Lord and Deputy Chief of the Naval Staff; 2019–2022	Succeeded by Martin Connell
