= David Eckersley-Maslin =

Royal Navy admiral (1929-2017)

Rear-Admiral David Eckersley-Maslin CB
- Born: 27 September 1929
- Died: 26 July 2017 (aged 87)
- Military career
- Allegiance: United Kingdom
- Branch: Royal Navy
- Rank: Rear-Admiral
- Commands: HMS Eastbourne; HMS Euryalus; HMS Fife; HMS Blake
- Conflicts: Malayan Emergency; Falklands War
- Awards: Companion of the Order of the Bath

Rear-Admiral David Michael Eckersley-Maslin CB (27 September 1929 - 26 July 2017) was a Royal Navy officer who served as Flag Officer Sea Training.

== Naval career ==
Educated at Britannia Royal Naval College, Eckersley-Maslin joined the Royal Navy and shortly thereafter saw action during the Malayan Emergency in the early 1950s. After serving as commanding officer of the frigates HMS Eastbourne and HMS Euryalus, he became Captain of the Royal Navy Presentation Team in 1974. He took command of the destroyer HMS Fife in early 1975 and then of the cruiser HMS Blake later that year. He went on to be Director of Naval Operational Requirements in 1977, Flag Officer Sea Training in 1980 and Assistant Chief of the Naval Staff (Operational Planning) during the Falklands War in 1982. His final appointments were as Assistant Director (Communications and Information Systems) at NATO in 1984 and as Director-General of the NATO Communications and Information Systems Agency in 1986 before retiring in 1991.

Eckersley-Maslin was appointed a Companion of the Order of the Bath in the 1984 Birthday Honours.

Eckersley-Maslin died on 26 July 2017.

Military offices
Preceded by Anthony Whetstone	Flag Officer Sea Training; 1980–1982	Succeeded by John Webster
