= Reginald Hutton =

Royal Navy officer

Rear-Admiral Reginald Hutton CB CBE DSO**
- Born: 28 September 1899; Hayfield, Cheshire
- Died: 18 January 1973 (aged 73); Wootton, Isle of Wight
- Relatives: Captain Tony Hutton (son)
- Military career
- Allegiance: United Kingdom
- Branch: Royal Navy
- Service years: 1913–1953
- Rank: Rear-Admiral
- Commands: HMS Triumph (1949); HMS Tyne (1943–44); 19th Destroyer Flotilla (1941–43); HMS Laforey (1941–43); HMS Wanderer (1928–29)
- Conflicts: First World War: Battle of Jutland; Second World War: Battle of Madagascar; Allied invasion of Italy; Invasion of Normandy
- Awards: Companion of the Order of the Bath; Commander of the Order of the British Empire; Distinguished Service Order & Two Bars; Mentioned in Despatches (3); King Haakon VII Freedom Cross (Norway)

Rear-Admiral Reginald Maurice James Hutton CB, CBE, DSO & Two Bars (28 September 1899 – 18 January 1973) was a Royal Navy officer. He participated in the Battle of Jutland during the First World War and was awarded the Distinguished Service Order and two Bars during the Second World War.

His son, Anthony Hutton, also had a distinguished naval career.
