= HMS Newcastle (D87) =

Destroyer of the Royal Navy

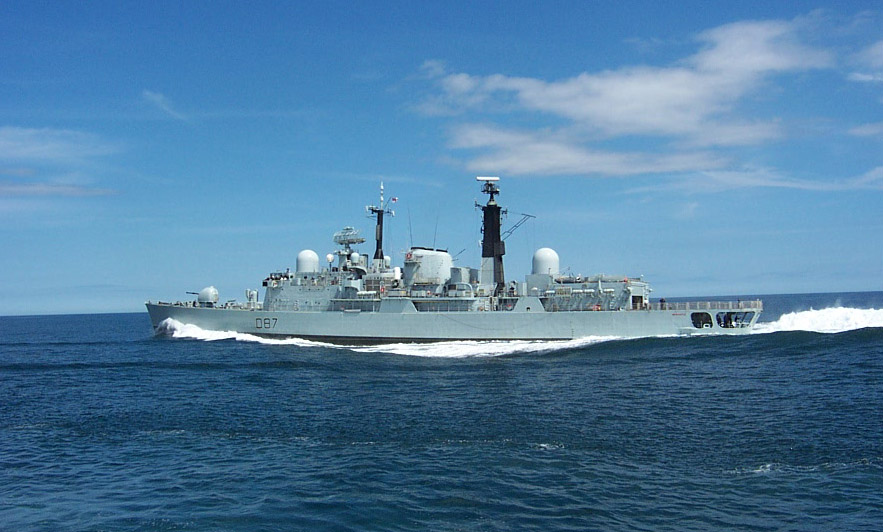

History

United Kingdom
- Name: HMS Newcastle
- Builder: Swan Hunter, Tyne and Wear
- Laid down: 21 February 1973
- Launched: 24 April 1975
- Commissioned: 23 March 1978
- Decommissioned: 1 February 2005
- Out of service: 1 February 2005
- Home port: Portsmouth
- Identification: Pennant number: D87; IMO number: 4907000
- Nickname(s): "The Geordie Gunboat"
- Fate: Scrapped 2008

General characteristics
- Class & type: Type 42 destroyer
- Displacement: 4,820 tonnes
- Length: 125 m (410 ft)
- Beam: 14.3 m (47 ft)
- Draught: 5.8 m (19 ft)
- Propulsion: COGOG (Combined Gas or Gas) turbines, 2 shafts; 4 Rolls-Royce (2 Olympus TM3B and 2 Tyne RM1C) producing 36 MW (48,000 hp)
- Speed: 30 knots (56 km/h)
- Complement: 287–312
- Armament: Twin Sea Dart Surface-to-air missile launcher; 1 × 4.5-inch (114 mm) Mk.8 gun; 2 × 20 mm Oerlikon guns; 2 × Phalanx Close-in weapon system; 2 × triple anti-submarine torpedo tubes; NATO Seagnat and DLF3 decoy launchers
- Aircraft carried: Lynx HMA8

The eighth HMS Newcastle was a batch 1 Type 42 destroyer of the Royal Navy, launched in 1975. Newcastle was decommissioned on 1 February 2005.

== Operational service ==
On 12 May 1992, Newcastle deployed with the Orient '92 group HMS Invincible, HMS Boxer, HMS Norfolk and RFA Olwen to the Far East. During this time she partook in Joint Exercises in the Malacca Straits and carried out diplomatic visits to The Seychelles, Singapore, Hong Kong, Japan and the Philippines. She returned on 27 November 1992. In 1993, Newcastle undertook exercises in the northern fjords of Norway during Exercise Battle Griffin '93 and undertook Fleet Ready Escort duties. On 8 September 1993 she deployed for Southlant duties as Falkland Islands Guardship. En route, she called in at Abidjan, Cote d'Ivoire and spent Christmas and New Year in and around the Falkland Island patrol areas. She was relieved by the Leander Class Frigate HMS Scylla and returned to UK via the Patagonian Canals, calling in at Valparaiso, Callao and Port of Spain with a fuelling stop at Ponta Delgado before returning to Portsmouth on 8 April 1994. The rest of 1994 was spent in maintenance and navigation training. She paid off into refit in Rosyth in July 1995. On her way north, Newcastle made a final goodwill visit of this commission to the city of her name.

In November 1997, Newcastle made her way to the Caribbean to assume duties as West Indies guard ship. This deployment was concerned primarily with counter narcotics operations and saw the ship embark a US Coast Guard Law Enforcement Detachment (LEDET) under the command of US Coast Guard District 7 in Miami. Throughout the eight months of the "WIGS" deployment Newcastle rendered assistance to the Governor and people of the British Overseas Territory of Montserrat following a devastating volcanic eruption. (Note: Liverpool had been the first ship to come to the aid of the people of Montserrat.) Newcastle re-entered Portsmouth Naval Base on 10 July 1998.

In 1999, Newcastle escorted the aircraft carrier Invincible during the Kosovo War, in which Invincible launched attacks on Serbian targets. Newcastle took part in six-month Atlantic Patrol Deployment in 2002. During this deployment, she visited Sierra Leone to display the continuing UK commitment to that country. Despite speculation that four Type 42s would be either decommissioned or mothballed, Newcastle deployed to the Mediterranean in January 2004 for a 7-month tour of duty.

== Decommissioning and disposal ==
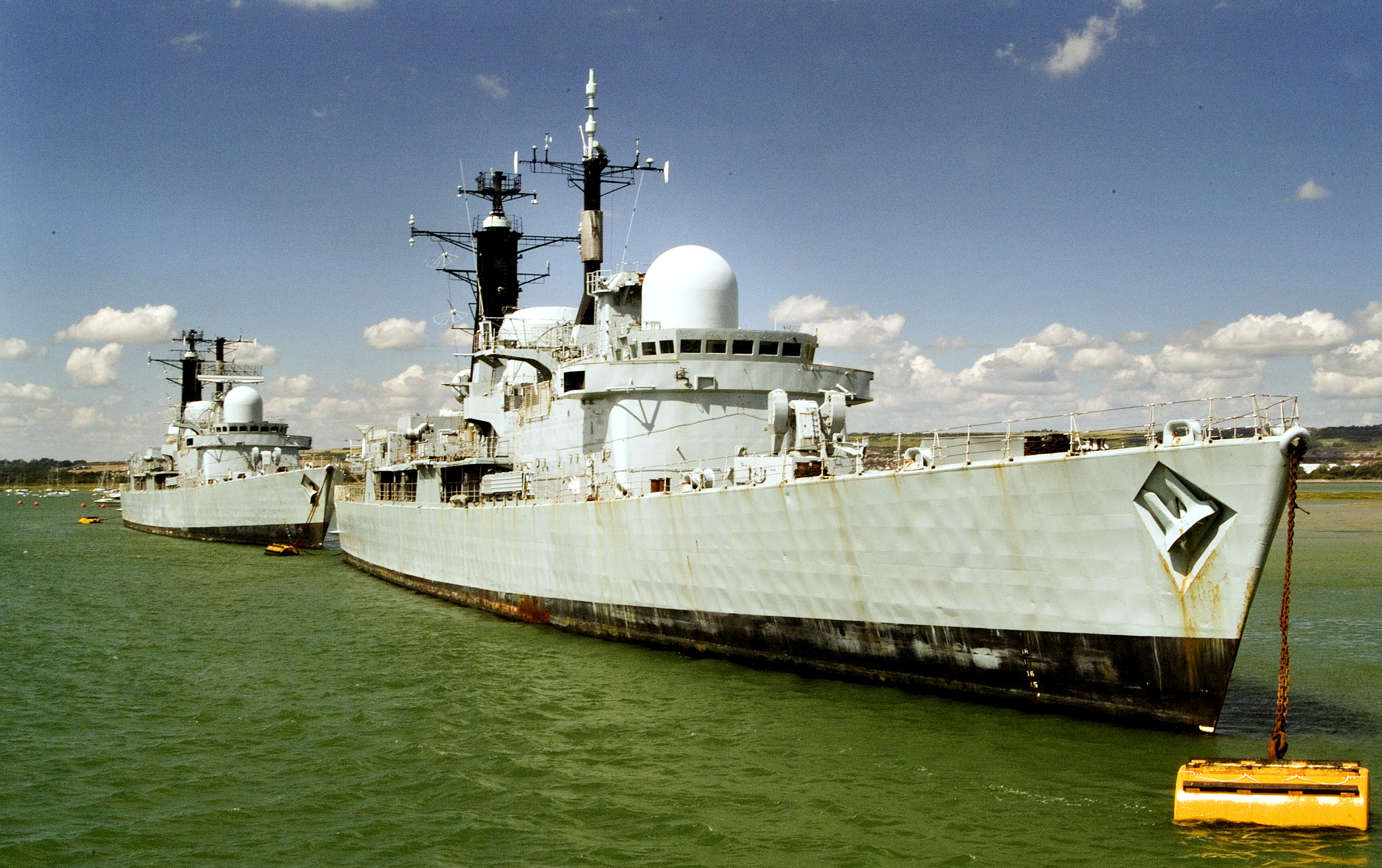
Newcastle with Cardiff in the background in 2007, in Portsmouth Harbour

It was announced in July 2004, as part of the Delivering Security in a Changing World review, that Newcastle would be decommissioned in January 2005. Newcastle was decommissioned on 1 February 2005 and placed into inactive reserve. Whilst sitting out at Fareham Creek she was cannibalised heavily to keep the remaining Type 42 destroyers running. On 21 November 2008 Newcastle left Portsmouth for the last time for Aliağa, Turkey under tow of the tug Lore to be scrapped.

There is a model of HMS Newcastle on the fourth floor of Barrow-in-Furness General Hospital.

== Notable commanders ==
Notable officers who commanded Newcastle include: Julian Oswald (1977-79), Norman King (1979-1980), Anthony Hutton (1982-1984) and Alan Massey (1993-1994).

== Affiliations ==
Newcastle was the adopted ship of the city of Newcastle upon Tyne. Her captain and crew were awarded the freedom of the city, and she was often referred to as "The Geordie Gunboat".

== Publications ==
- Colledge, J. J.; Warlow, Ben (2006) [1969]. Ships of the Royal Navy: The Complete Record of All Fighting Ships of the Royal Navy from the 15th Century to the Present (3rd Rev ed.). London: Chatham Publishing. ISBN 978-1-86176-281-8. OCLC 67375475.
