= Duncan Forbes (Royal Marines officer) =

British Royal Marines officer

Major General Duncan Forbes
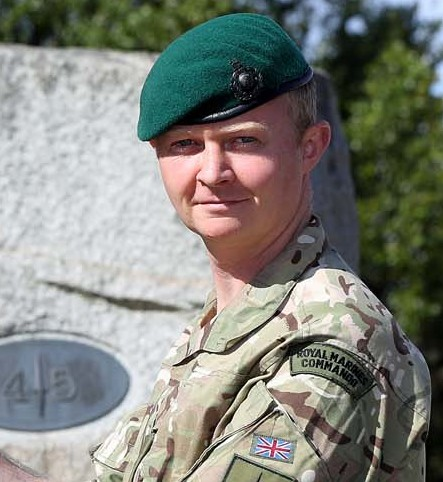
- Forbes (then Lieutenant Colonel) in 2017
- Military career
- Allegiance: United Kingdom
- Branch: Royal Marines
- Service years: –present
- Rank: Major-General
- Commands: 3 Commando Brigade (2022–2024); 45 Commando (2017–2019)
- Conflicts: War in Afghanistan

Major-General Duncan Graham Forbes is a senior Royal Marines officer. He served as Assistant Chief of the Naval Staff (Policy) from 2024 to 2025.

== Military career ==
Forbes joined the Corps of Royal Marines and was mentioned in despatches for service in Afghanistan in July 2007. He was deployed to Afghanistan again in spring 2010. He became commanding officer of 45 Commando in 2017, Director of the Naval Staff in May 2021, and commander of 3 Commando Brigade in September 2022. Promoted to major-general, he became Assistant Chief of the Naval Staff (Policy) in March 2024.

Military offices
Preceded by Anthony Rimington	Assistant Chief of the Naval Staff (Policy); 2024–2025	Succeeded by Paul Maynard
