= Martin Connell (Royal Navy officer) =

Royal Navy Vice Admiral (born 1968)

Vice Admiral Sir Martin Connell KCB CBE
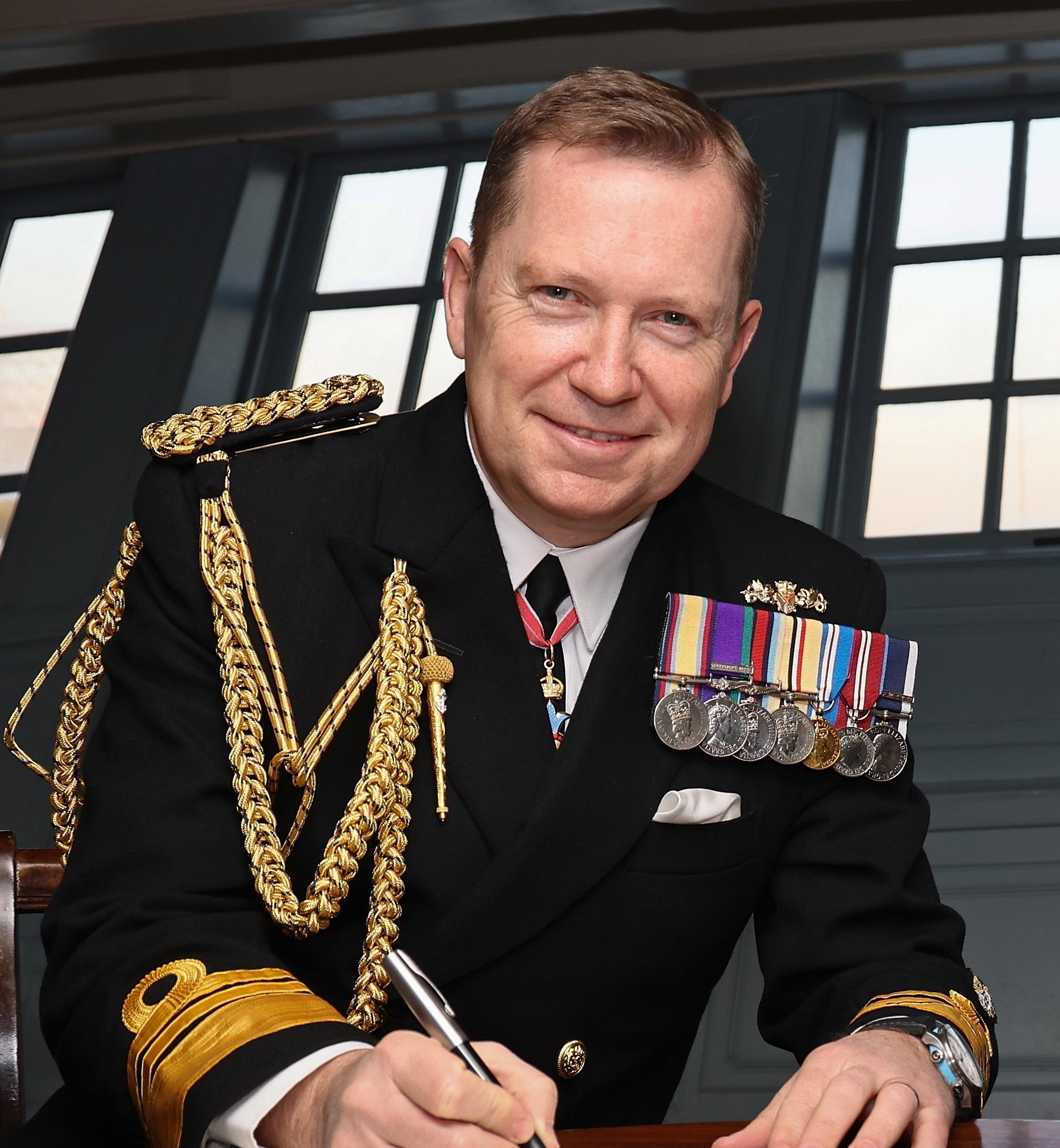
- Vice Admiral Connell in 2022
- Born: 18 December 1968 (age 57); Rotherham, Yorkshire, UK
- Military career
- Allegiance: United Kingdom
- Branch: Royal Navy
- Service years: 1987–2026
- Rank: Vice Admiral
- Service number: C034297Q
- Commands: Acting First Sea Lord; Second Sea Lord; Fleet Air Arm; Amphibious Task Group; HMS Illustrious; HMS Chatham; HMS Severn
- Conflicts: Gulf War; War in Afghanistan; Iraq War
- Awards: Knight Commander of the Order of the Bath; Commander of the Order of the British Empire

Vice Admiral Sir Martin John Connell, KCB, CBE (born 18 December 1968) is a former senior Royal Navy officer, who served as Second Sea Lord and Deputy Chief of Naval Staff from 2022 to 2025.

== Naval career ==
Connell was commissioned into the Royal Navy in 1987 as a Lynx Observer. He became a Qualified Observer Instructor (QOI) at 702 Naval Air Squadron and then a Flight Commander on HMS Coventry and HMS Manchester, before instructing observers at 815 Naval Air Squadron. He was given command of the offshore patrol vessel HMS Severn in 2003. As the commanding officer of HMS Chatham, Connell led maritime operations in support of Operation Telic; his frigate became known for successfully protecting Iraqi offshore oil platforms, anti-piracy actions in the Arabian Sea and for interdicting a large shipment of illegal drugs.

Promoted to captain on 5 September 2011, Connell took command of the aircraft carrier HMS Illustrious in 2012. He was promoted to Commodore on 10 February 2015, appointed Commander Amphibious Task Group later that year, and then made naval attaché to Washington D.C. in 2016. Connell next served as Assistant Chief of Naval Staff (Aviation, Amphibious Capability & Carriers) and head of the Fleet Air Arm from 2019, and then as Director Force Generation under the Fleet Commander, Vice Admiral Andrew Burns, being succeeded by Rear Admiral Steve Moorhouse on 14 January 2022 upon his appointment as Second Sea Lord in succession to Vice Admiral Sir Nick Hine. He was promoted to vice admiral on 12 January 2022.

As Second Sea Lord, Connell is responsible for delivering the Royal Navy’s future capabilities, including SSN-AUKUS submarines. Connell is reported to be an advocate for increasing the UK's shipbuilding, surface vehicles and subsurface, crewed and un-crewed, prioritising "offensive strike capability over all else." He retired from the Royal Navy on 28 January 2026.

A graduate of the United States Naval War College, where he took the Naval Command College Course in 2004/05 (being elected International Fellow), Connell completed the Higher Command and Staff Course at Shrivenham in 2011, the United States National Defense University CAPSTONE Course in 2017, and UK Pinnacle at the Royal College of Defence Studies in 2021.

Connell was appointed a Commander of the Order of the British Empire in the 2020 New Year Honours, and a Knight Commander of the Order of the Bath in 2025 New Year Honours, and has received the Naval Long Service and Good Conduct Medal with one clasp.

Admitted in 2012 as a Freeman of the Worshipful Company of Shipwrights, Connell is also a Younger Brother of Trinity House.

Military offices
Preceded by Keith Blount	Rear Admiral Fleet Air Arm; 2019–2022	Office re-designated as Commodore Fleet Air Arm
Preceded by Sir Nick Hine	Second Sea Lord and Deputy Chief of the Naval Staff; 2022–2025	Succeeded by Paul Beattie
