= David Scott (Royal Navy officer) =

Royal Navy Rear-Admiral (1921–2006)

Rear-Admiral Sir David Scott KBE CB
- Born: William David Stuart Scott; 5 April 1921
- Died: 20 January 2006 (aged 84)
- Burial place: St.Michael's Anglican Church, Camberley
- Military career
- Allegiance: United Kingdom
- Branch: Royal Navy
- Service years: 1937 - 1980 (43 years)
- Rank: Rear-Admiral
- Awards: Knight Commander of the Order of the British Empire; Companion of the Order of the Bath

Rear-Admiral Sir David Scott, KBE, CB (5 April 1921 – 20 January 2006) was an officer in the Royal Navy from 1937 to 1980. He was second in command and served as a first lieutenant aboard HMS Seraph during Operation Mincemeat. Scott served on ten submarines in peace and war, commanding five of them. Scott was a popular officer noted for his gentlemanly way with subordinates and his sharp sense of humour.

== The Second World War ==
Scott was at sea in the battleship HMS Revenge at the outbreak of war, he took part in convoy operations and the bombardment of Cherbourg, during the period when invasion threatened. Transferring to submarines, he served in three small and old-fashioned boats before his time in HMS Seraph. His first command was the submarine HMS Umbra, training new commanding officers, and then, towards the end of the war, Vulpine and Satyr.

== Operation Mincemeat ==
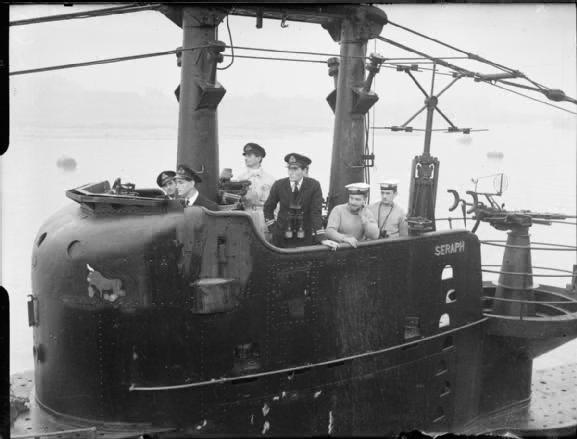
First lieutenant Scott on HMS Seraph (centre with binoculars)

With lieutenant Bill Jewell in command, had not only a successful record in sinking shipping in dangerous Mediterranean waters but also a reputation for clandestine operations. It was Seraph that landed General Mark Clark on the Algerian coast for consultations with French authorities prior to the North African invasion, and smuggled General Giraud out of the South of France to join the Allies in Algiers. She made several supply drops for Italian partisans and survived many depth charge attacks, including one direct hit.

But Operation Mincemeat in 1943 provided the most unconventional and dramatic story, indeed one that has featured in novel and film as The Man Who Never Was. Scott believed that a large canister embarked at Holy Loch in Scotland was "optical instruments", as marked, until, off the Spanish port of Huelva, it was revealed that it contained a body dressed as a major of Royal Marines. The body, of a man who had died of pneumonia, exhibited, Mincemeat’s planners were assured by the renowned pathologist Sir Bernard Spilsbury, exhibited all the characteristics of drowning. On it were carefully devised high-level documents purporting to show that the Allies were planning to invade Southern Europe through Greece, while holding Sardinia and Corsica.

With Scott on the bridge and Jewell on the upper-deck casing with two officers to assist – the remainder of the crew being kept in ignorance – Seraph crept close inshore in the dark and launched this "courier" together with a half-inflated RAF life raft. The documents found their way to the Nazi Headquarters, altering their plans to reinforce Sicily, the true invasion point.

== Post Second World War ==
In 1946, as second-in-command of the destroyer HMS Volage, he received a C-in-C’s commendation for his courage and coolness when his ship was mined by the Albanians in the Corfu Channel disaster. In May a force of British warships had passed between Corfu and the mainland and had been fired on by Albanian shore batteries, prompting an angry diplomatic response. A second force of two cruisers and two destroyers was consequently sent through the channel in order to demonstrate legal rights.

While in international waters, the destroyer HMS Saumarez struck a mine which blew off her bow and started an enormous fire which accounted for most of her 36 killed. Saumarez was taken in tow, stem first, by Volage, who herself hit a mine shortly afterwards, her crew sustaining eight deaths. By superb seamanship, Volage managed to tow Saumarez to Corfu. At the International Court at The Hague, Britain was awarded damages of £843,000 – which have never been paid.

Scott next commanded HMS Meteorite, an ex-German U-boat driven by high-test peroxide (or HTP) which conferred high underwater speed with no need for air, but which was, in sober terms, a death trap. A number of explosions eventually proved that HTP was not a suitable propellant for submarines or torpedoes.

In 1948 he was appointed flag lieutenant to the C-in-C Far East Fleet and was on the fringes of the famous escape of the frigate HMS Amethyst from under the guns of the Chinese Communists on the Yangtse river. This unfortunate entanglement resulted in damage and casualties to four naval ships before Amethyst made her exit. Because she had destroyed all her secret radio codes against capture, Scott’s contribution was to devise and signal to Amethyst a " one-time pad" encryption system based on her nominal crew list which was fortunately available at both ends.

In the next ten years Scott led the midget submarine development unit, undertook staff and training duties and commanded a frigate and two submarines. He achieved the first submerged transatlantic crossing by a diesel submarine in HMS Andrew in 1953, a protracted test of snort mast breathing and of the crew’s patience – near-surface dived passages are not comfortable in submarines.

In 1962 his course at the US Naval War College was the start of a warm relationship with the US Navy. He then commanded a submarine squadron and the depot ship and, after a tour in the Admiralty, the guided missile destroyer HMS Fife. While in Fife he made a circumnavigation of the globe.

== Promotion and work in Washington ==
Promoted rear-admiral in 1971, he was posted to Washington D.C. as the head of the British naval mission, forming useful relations with politicians, with Pentagon officials and a friendship with the charismatic US Navy chief, Admiral Elmo Zumwalt.

== Polaris ==
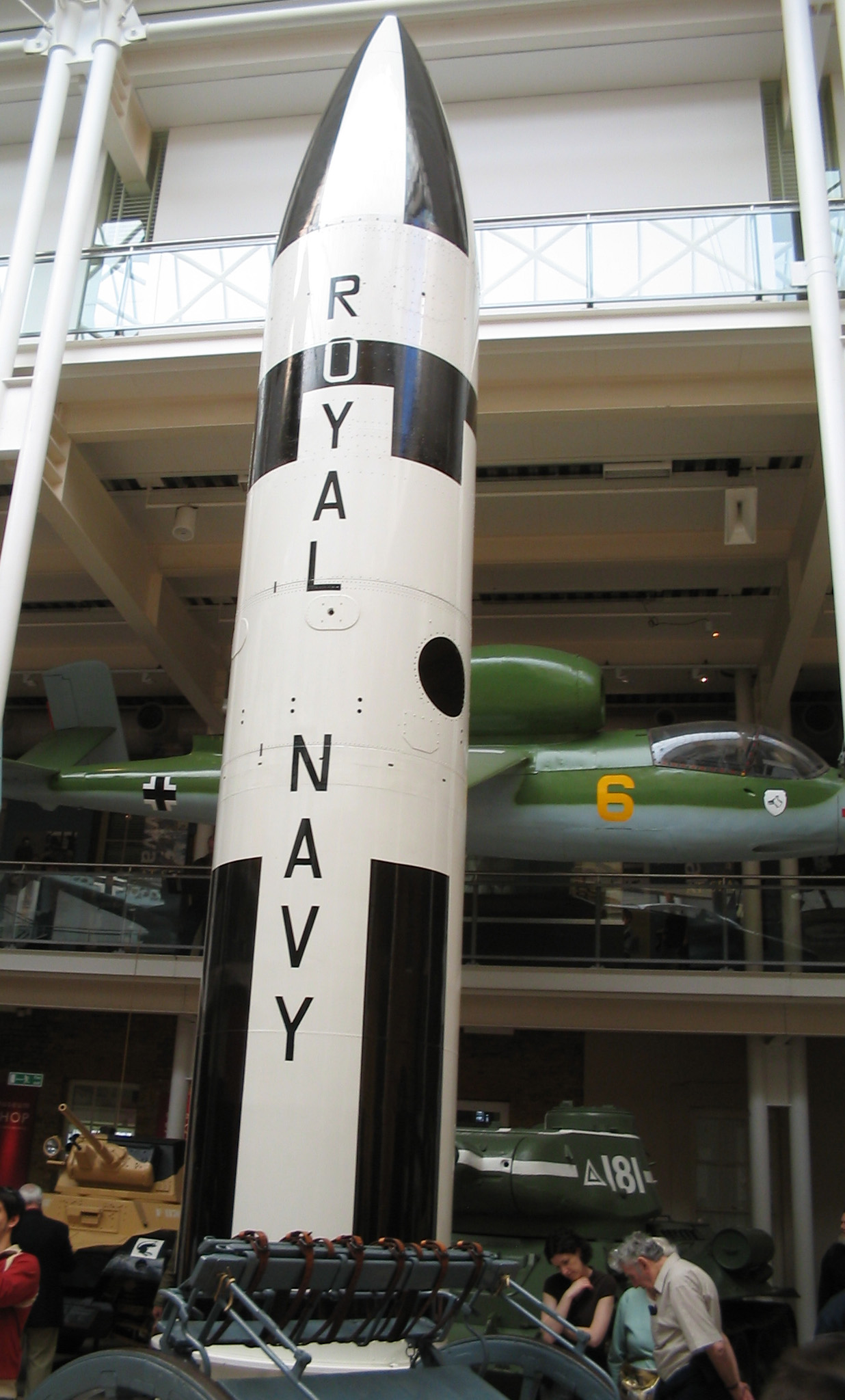
SSBN A3 Polaris Missile (full-scale model) in the Imperial War Museum, London

On return home in 1973 he was appointed deputy controller of the UK Polaris programme, Britain’s submarine-borne nuclear deterrent. At this time, the post reported to the Navy Board member responsible for equipment procurement, the Controller of the Navy, and had no oversight of scientific aspects.

After exhausting other avenues, Scott blew the whistle on the Chevaline development to the First Sea Lord on the grounds that cost and time had not been properly evaluated and that certain facts had been concealed. By 1976 the cost had doubled to £600 million; it was eventually to cost over £1billion at contemporary values.

As a result, the department was reorganised; Scott became the chief Polaris programme executive, reporting to the First Sea Lord and with responsibility for both scientific and naval aspects. His involvement with the Polaris programme would last for seven years. He was appointed C.B. in 1974 and K.B.E in 1977.

== Retirement from the Navy and death ==
Retiring in 1980, he became a director of Civil and Marine, a sea-dredged aggregates company, with which he remained involved up to his death. Scott was loved by so many of the people who knew him, some of the men who Scott commanded over decided to name a street after him, David Scott Avenue, located in Midlothian, Scotland. Sir David Scott died on 20 January 2006. He had a wife, Pamela (nee Whitlock), who died aged 91 on 12 January 2023, and three children, Claudia, Richard and Julia.

== Timeline of positions ==
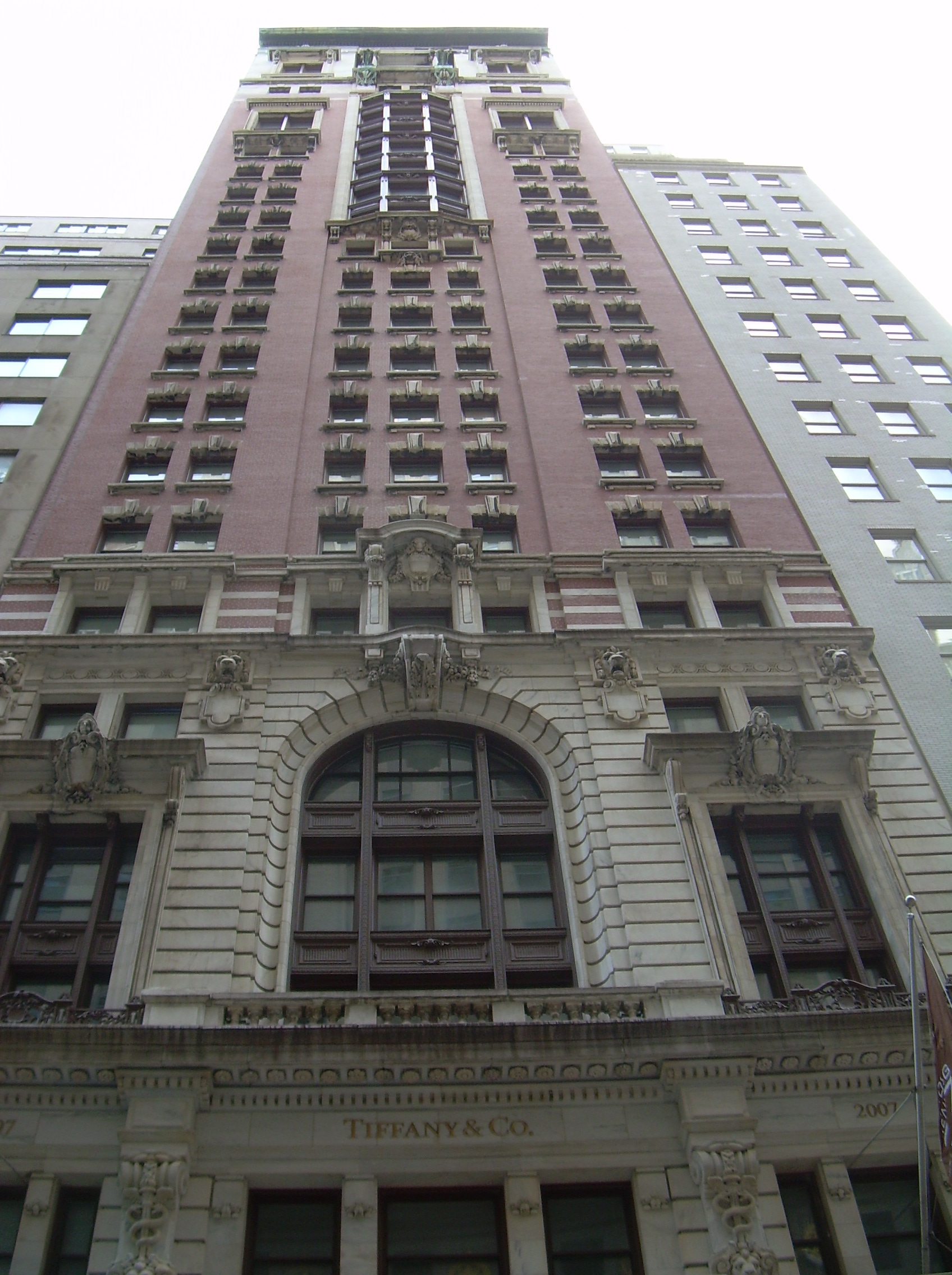
Scott was Commander of British Navy Staff here, UK National Liaison Representative to SACLANT, and Naval Attaché to the USA from 1971–1973

Education – Tonbridge

01.09.1938	–	04.1939	Special entry cadet, HMS Vindictive (cadet training cruiser)
07.1939	–	02.1941	HMS Revenge (battleship) (convoy operations & bombardment of Cherbourg)
09.06.1942	–	08.1942	HMS Cyclops(depot ship)
10.09.1942	–	02.1943	HMS Unruly(submarine)
06.04.1943	–	12.1943	First lieutenant, HMS Seraph (submarine)
03.1944	–	06.1944	First lieutenant, HMS Seanymph (submarine)
1944	–	1945	Commanding officer, HMS Umbra (submarine)
1945	–	1945	Commanding officer, HMS Vulpine (submarine)
16.06.1945	–	07.1945	Commanding officer, HMS Satyr(submarine)
04.1946			no appointment listed
1946	–	1946	First lieutenant, HMS Volage (destroyer)
1946	–	1947	Commanding officer, HMS Meteorite (ex-German submarine)
07.1948			HMS Montclare (F85)
11.01.1949	–	05.1950	Flag lieutenant to commander-in-chief, Far East Station HMS Terror (Singapore Naval Base)
1951			Commanding officer, HMS Gateshead
05.08.1952	–	05.1953	Commanding officer, HMS Andrew (submarine)
11.1954	–	01.1956	Commanding officer, HMS Thermopylae (submarine)
15.10.1956	–	01.1957	Training commander, Britannia Royal Naval College, Dartmouth (HMS Dartmouth)
1958			Fleet operations officer, Home Fleet
1960	–	07.1961	Commanding officer, HMS Surprise
1962	–	02.1963	US Naval War College (HMS Saker)
12.09.1963	–	02.1964	Commanding officer, HMS Adamant and captain (S/M) 2nd Submarine Squadron
1965			Deputy director of defence plans (navy)
12.12.1966	–	02.1969	Chief staff officer to flag officer Submarines HMS Dolphin (submarine depot), Gosport
1969			Commanding officer, HMS Fife (guided missile destroyer)
08.1971	–	1973	Commander, British Navy Staff, Washington, UK National Liaison Representative to SACLANT, and naval attaché to the United States (HMS Saker)
1973	–	1976	Deputy controller, UK Polaris programme
1976	–	1980	Chief UK Polaris programme executive
1980	–	2006	Director of Civil and Marine, a sea-dredged aggregates company

== Ranks held ==
Rank	Year rank attained
Cadet	01.09.1938
Midsh.	01.09.1939
A/S.Lt.	> 02.1941
S.Lt.	1941
A/Lt.	16.02.1942
Lt.	09.1942, seniority 16.02.1942
Lt.Cdr.	16.02.1950
Cdr.	30.06.1956
Capt.	30.06.1962
R.Adm.	07.07.1971 (retd 16.06.1980)
