= Anthony Rimington =

Royal Navy Rear Admiral

Rear Admiral Anthony Rimington
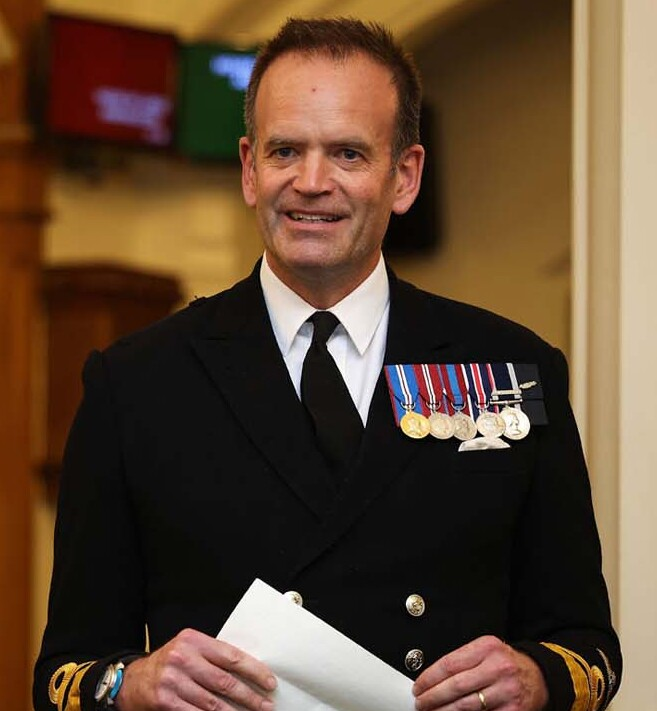
- Rear Admiral Rimington in 2024
- Military career
- Allegiance: United Kingdom
- Branch: Royal Navy
- Service years: 1991–present
- Rank: Rear Admiral
- Commands: RNAS Culdrose (HMS Seahawk) (2018–20); 702 Naval Air Squadron (2012–13)
- Conflicts: Operation Active Endeavour; Operation Kipion
- Awards: Queen's Commendation for Valuable Service

Rear Admiral Anthony Kingsmill Rimington is a senior Royal Navy officer. He currently serves as Director of Force Generation and Rear Admiral Fleet Air Arm.

== Naval career ==
Educated at Sherborne School and Durham University, Rimington joined the Royal Navy in September 1991. He trained as a naval pilot and took part in the evacuation of personnel from Beirut in 2006. He became commanding officer of 702 Naval Air Squadron in 2012, planning team lead at UK Maritime Component Command in 2014 and Deputy Assistant Chief of Staff Navy Commitments in 2015. After that he became chief of staff to the Carrier Enabled Power Projection team in 2016 and station commander of RNAS Culdrose (HMS Seahawk) in 2018. He was appointed Principal Staff Officer to the Chief of the Defence Staff in 2020 and, on promotion to rear admiral, he became Assistant Chief of the Naval Staff (Policy) in 2022.

Rimington went on to be Director of Force Generation and Rear Admiral Fleet Air Arm in 2024.

Military offices
Preceded by Iain Lower	Assistant Chief of the Naval Staff (Policy); 2022–2024	Succeeded by Duncan Forbes
