= Gwynedd Pritchard =

Rear-Admiral Gwynedd Pritchard CB
- Born: 18 June 1924
- Died: July 2012 (aged 88); Dorset County Hospital
- Military career
- Allegiance: United Kingdom
- Branch: Royal Navy
- Service years: 1942–1981
- Rank: Rear-Admiral
- Commands: HMS Phoebe
- Conflicts: Second World War
- Awards: Companion of the Order of the Bath

Rear-Admiral Gwynedd Idris Pritchard CB (18 June 1924–July 2012) was a Royal Navy officer who served as Flag Officer Sea Training.

== Naval career ==
Educated at Wyggeston School in Leicester, Pritchard joined the Royal Navy in 1942 during the Second World War. He became commanding officer of the frigate HMS Phoebe in February 1970. He was appointed Director of Naval Operations and Trade under the Ministry of Defence Naval Staff in November 1972 to July 1974 and Captain of the School of Maritime Operations in October 1974. He went on to be Flag Officer Sea Training in November 1976 and Flag Officer Gibraltar in January 1979 before retiring in January 1981.

Pritchard was appointed a Companion of the Order of the Bath in the 1981 New Year Honours. He died in July 2012.

Military offices
Preceded by John Gerard-Pearse	Flag Officer Sea Training; 1976–1978	Succeeded by Anthony Whetstone
