= James Dunbar Cook =

Royal Navy Admiral (1921–2007)

Rear-Admiral James Dunbar Cook CB DL
- Born: 12 December 1921; Pluscarden, Elgin, Moray
- Died: 26 January 2007 (aged 85); Haslemere, Surrey
- Military career
- Allegiance: United Kingdom
- Branch: Royal Navy
- Service years: 1940–1975
- Rank: Rear-Admiral
- Commands: HMS Norfolk (1971); HMS Afrikander (1967–69); HMS Dido (1963–65); HMS Venus (1956–58)
- Conflicts: Second World War
- Awards: Companion of the Order of the Bath

Rear-Admiral James William Dunbar "Bill" Cook CB, DL (12 December 1921 – 26 January 2007) was a senior Royal Navy officer.

== Naval career ==
Born on 12 December 1921, James Dunbar Cook was educated at Bedford School and HMS Worcester. He was commander of HMS Venus, HMS Dido and HMS Norfolk. He was senior british naval officer in South Africa, between 1967 and 1969, director of the Royal Naval War College, between 1969 and 1971, and assistant chief of the naval staff, between 1973 and 1975.

Rear Admiral James Dunbar Cook retired from the Royal Navy in 1975 and was invested as a Companion of the Order of the Bath in the 1975 New Year Honours. He died on 26 January 2007.
