= HMS Juno (F52) =

1967 Type 12I or Leander-class frigate of the Royal Navy

History

United Kingdom
- Name: HMS Juno
- Operator: Royal Navy
- Builder: Vosper Thornycroft
- Laid down: 16 July 1964
- Launched: 24 November 1965
- Commissioned: 18 July 1967
- Decommissioned: 4 November 1992
- Identification: Pennant number: F52
- Fate: Sold for scrap 1994

General characteristics
- Class & type: Leander-class frigate
- Displacement: 3,200 long tons (3,251 t) full load
- Length: 113.4 m (372 ft)
- Beam: 12.5 m (41 ft)
- Draught: 5.8 m (19 ft)
- Propulsion: 2 × Babcock & Wilcox boilers supplying steam to two sets of White-English Electric double-reduction geared turbines to two shafts
- Speed: 28 knots (52 km/h)
- Range: 4,600 nautical miles (8,500 km) at 15 knots (28 km/h)
- Complement: 223
- Armament: As built: 1 × twin 4.5 inch (114 mm) guns; 1 × quadruple Sea Cat anti-aircraft missile launchers; 1 × Limbo anti-submarine mortar; 2 x 20mm Oerlikon guns; From 1980: 4 × Exocet anti-ship missile launchers; 2 × quadruple Seacat anti-aircraft missile launchers; 2 × single 40 mm Bofors anti-aircraft guns; 2 × triple torpedo tubes
- Aircraft carried: 1 × Westland Wasp helicopter; From 1980: 1 × Lynx helicopter

HMS Juno was a Leander-class frigate of the Royal Navy (RN). Like the rest of the class, Juno was named after a figure of mythology. She was built by Thornycroft of Woolston, Hampshire. Juno was launched on 24 November 1965 and commissioned on 18 July 1967.

== Operational service ==
Juno had a variety of deployments from commissioning in 1967 that culminated in a 1969 Far East Deployment, visiting a variety of ports in countries, including St Vincent, Panama, Peru, Chile, Tristan de Cunha, Cape Town, Port Elizabeth, Mombasa, Diego Suarez, Gan, Singapore, Hong Kong, Japan, and Simonstown, returning to the UK towards the end of 1970. Between 1967 and 1969 she was commanded by Captain R D Lygo. Juno was one of a number of Leanders that undertook the Beira Patrol, in this case for five weeks while on her way back to the UK in 1969. The Beira Patrol was a deployment designed to stop oil reaching landlocked Rhodesia via the then Portuguese colony of Mozambique. Between 1967 and 1974, she was the senior ship (known as 'Captain D') of the 4th Frigate Squadron. Between 1971 and 1973 she was commanded by Captain A Whetstone. In 1972 she spent some months in the Mediterranean travelling as far as Greece before returning to Gibraltar as guard ship. Later that year she was sent North to Icelandic waters for "Cod War" duties.

In the 1970s Juno was one of the six Leanders used as the fictional "HMS Hero" for the BBC TV drama series Warship. All members of the crew were given Hero cap tallies for filming purposes.

In 1976, Juno took part in the Third Cod War, a fishing dispute against Iceland. On 6 February, while on a Fishery Protection Patrol, Juno collided with ICGV Týr, which had already engaged several RN vessels. The ramming caused a minor fire. Juno made a second patrol, and on 12 March it again collided with Týr.

Following the damage received whilst undertaking fishery protection duties, Juno underwent a substantial refit in 1977, and following intensive workup at Portland in March 1978, joined the 5th Frigate Squadron for a nine-month deployment. Ports visited during this time included Brest, Bermuda, Belize, Tortolla, Panama, San Diego, Victoria, Prince Rupert, San Francisco, Acapulco, Panama, Puerto Rico, Dominica and Key West.

During the visit to Dominica in November 1978, Juno was the warship present when Princess Margaret formally handed over independence. For the ceremony at the cricket pavilion, Juno provided the ceremonial guard and colour party.

In 1980, commanded by Commander M Bickley, Juno joined the Standing Naval Force Atlantic (STANAVFORLANT), a NATO multi-national squadron, a role Juno was familiar with, having often deployed with NATO multi-national squadrons. Commander STANAVFORLANT, Commodore D G Armytage was embarked for five months. The following year, Juno, due to the 1981 Defence Review by the defence minister John Nott, was placed in reserve when she joined the standby squadron. In 1985, Juno completed a four-year refit, which removed all her weapons and converted her into a navigational training ship. The following year Juno while the navigational training ship grounded in the Solent, which forced her to receive repairs. In 1987 she collided with the Type 21 frigate Active.

== Fate ==
Juno decommissioned in November 1992. She was sold for scrap in 1994.

== Publications ==
- Colledge, J. J.; Warlow, Ben (2006) [1969]. Ships of the Royal Navy: The Complete Record of All Fighting Ships of the Royal Navy from the 15th Century to the Present (3rd Rev ed.). London: Chatham Publishing. ISBN 978-1-86176-281-8. OCLC 67375475.
- Marriott, Leo, 1983. Royal Navy Frigates 1945–1983, Ian Allan Ltd. ISBN 07110 1322 5
