= HMS Sentinel (P256) =

Submarine of the Royal Navy

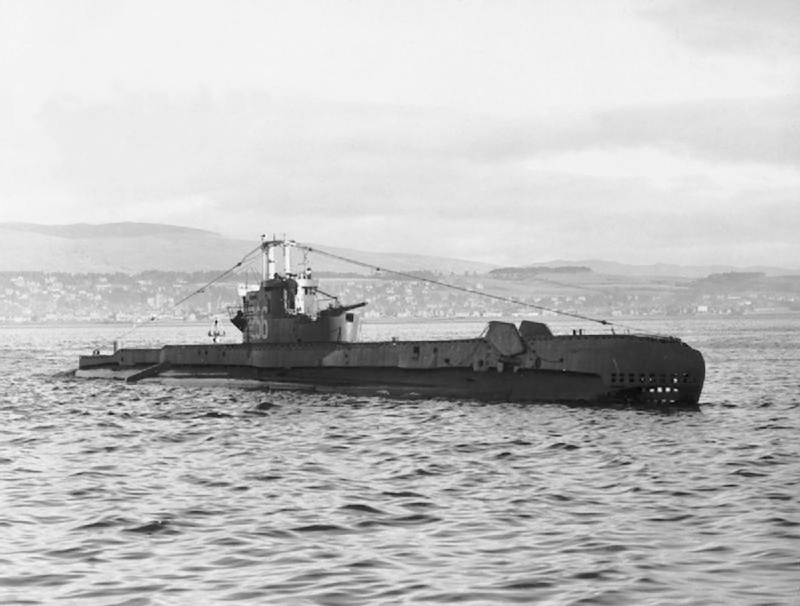
- HMS Sentinel

History

United Kingdom
- Name: HMS Sentinel
- Builder: Scotts, Greenock
- Laid down: 15 November 1943
- Launched: 27 July 1945
- Commissioned: 28 December 1945
- Fate: Sold 28 February 1962
- Badge

General characteristics
- Class & type: S-class submarine
- Displacement: 814 long tons (827 t) surfaced; 990 long tons (1,010 t) submerged
- Length: 217 ft (66.1 m)
- Beam: 23 ft 9 in (7.2 m)
- Draught: 14 ft 1 in (4.3 m)
- Installed power: 1,900 bhp (1,400 kW) (diesel); 1,300 hp (970 kW) (electric)
- Propulsion: 2 × diesel engines; 2 × electric motors
- Speed: 14.75 knots (27.32 km/h; 16.97 mph) surfaced; 9 knots (17 km/h; 10 mph) submerged
- Range: 7,500 nmi (13,900 km; 8,600 mi) at 10 knots (19 km/h; 12 mph) surface; 120 nmi (220 km; 140 mi) at 3 knots (5.6 km/h; 3.5 mph) submerged
- Test depth: 350 feet (106.7 m)
- Complement: 48
- Armament: 6 × bow 21 in (533 mm) torpedo tubes; 1 × 4-inch (102 mm) deck gun

HMS Sentinel was a S-class submarine of the third batch built for the Royal Navy during World War II. She was not completed until after the war and was sold for scrap in 1962.

== Design and description ==
The last 17 boats of the third batch were significantly modified from the earlier boats. They had a stronger hull, carried more fuel and their armament was revised. The submarines had a length of 217 feet (66.1 m) overall, a beam of 23 feet 9 inches (7.2 m) and a draught of 14 feet 1 inch (4.3 m). They displaced 814 long tons (827 t) on the surface and 990 long tons (1,010 t) submerged. The S-class submarines had a crew of 48 officers and ratings. They had a diving depth of 350 feet (106.7 m).

For surface running, the boats were powered by two 950-brake-horsepower (708 kW) diesel engines, each driving one propeller shaft. When submerged each propeller was driven by a 650-horsepower (485 kW) electric motor. They could reach 14.75 knots (27.32 km/h; 16.97 mph) on the surface and 9 knots (17 km/h; 10 mph) underwater. On the surface, the third batch boats had a range of 7,500 nautical miles (13,900 km; 8,600 mi) at 10 knots (19 km/h; 12 mph) and 120 nmi (220 km; 140 mi) at 3 knots (5.6 km/h; 3.5 mph) submerged.

Sentinel was armed with six 21 inch (533 mm) torpedo tubes in the bow. She carried six reload torpedoes for a grand total of a dozen torpedoes. Twelve mines could be carried in lieu of the torpedoes. The boat was also equipped with a 4-inch (102 mm) deck gun.

== Construction and career ==
HMS Sentinel was built by Scotts of Greenock and launched on 27 July 1945. Commissioned after the Second World War, she had a peaceful career. In 1953 she took part in the Fleet Review to celebrate the Coronation of Queen Elizabeth II. Sentinel was sold on 28 February 1962, being broken up at Gillingham.
