= HMS Norfolk (D21) =

County-class guided missile destroyer of the Royal Navy and Chilean Navy

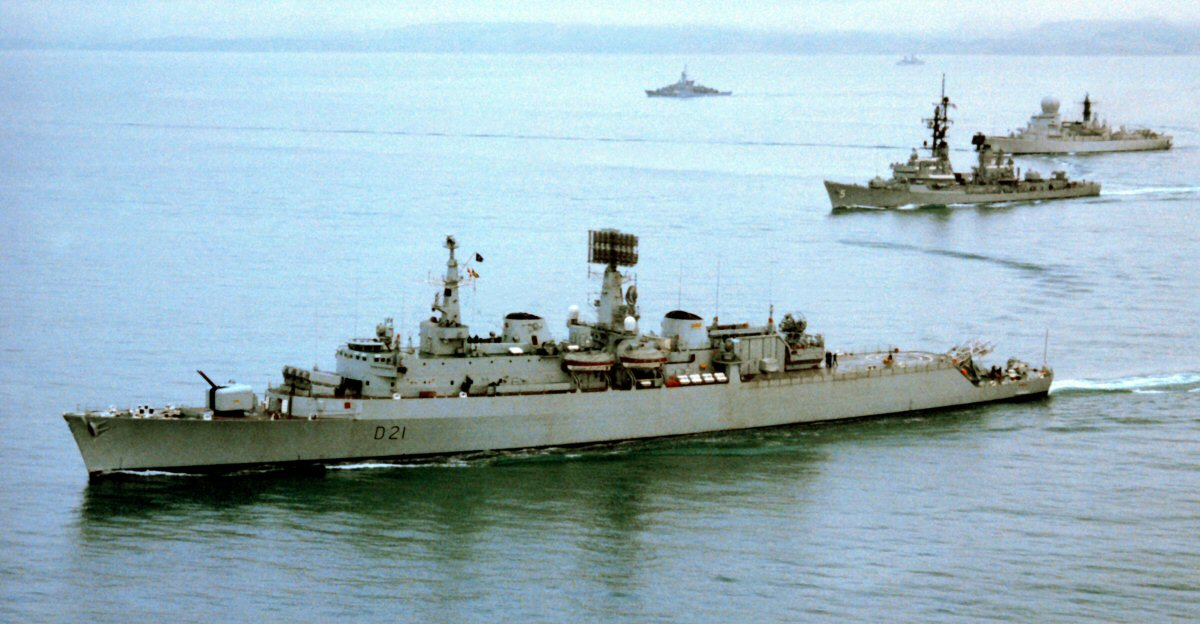
- HMS Norfolk

History

United Kingdom
- Name: HMS Norfolk
- Ordered: 5 January 1965
- Builder: Swan Hunter
- Laid down: 15 March 1966
- Launched: 16 November 1967
- Commissioned: 7 March 1970
- Decommissioned: 1981
- Identification: Pennant number: D21
- Fate: Sold to Chile on 6 April 1982

Chile
- Name: Capitán Prat
- Acquired: April 1982
- Decommissioned: 11 August 2006
- Fate: Sold for scrap September 2008

General characteristics
- Class & type: County-class destroyer
- Displacement: 6,200 tons; 6,800 tons (full load)
- Length: 522 ft (159 m)
- Beam: 53 ft (16 m)
- Draught: 20 ft (6.1 m)
- Propulsion: Combined steam and gas turbines, 2 shafts
- Speed: 32 knots (59 km/h)
- Range: 4,000 nautical miles (7,000 km) at 28 knots (52 km/h)
- Capacity: 470
- Armament: 2 × Twin 4.5-inch (113 mm) guns (1 pair removed after refit); 2 × 20 mm Oerlikon guns; 1 × Twin Sea Slug launcher; 2 × Quad Sea Cat missile launchers; 4 × Exocet missile launchers (added after refit)
- Aircraft carried: 1 × Westland Wessex helicopter

HMS Norfolk (pennant D21) was a County-class destroyer of the Royal Navy. She was the fourth Group 2 and the last of the County-class built.

The fifth ship named Norfolk, she was laid down on 15 March 1966 by Swan Hunter and launched by Lavinia, Duchess of Norfolk on 16 November 1967. She was commissioned on 7 March 1970.

In 1982 she was sold to Chile and served in their navy as Capitán Prat until 2006 and subsequently sold for scrap.

== Design ==
Norfolk is described as a destroyer, rather than a cruiser, because the Royal Navy and First Sea Lord Earl Mountbatten had seen guided missile destroyers as easier to gain approval from the Treasury than cruisers, when the class originated in the late 1950s. By the late 1960s the armament being fitted to Norfolk was dated and limited with no more than the guns of a mid-1950s destroyer and a supposedly improved Sea Slug missile which was untested at the time work on Norfolk started. By the mid-1960s the Minister of Defence Denis Healey and the Labour Government were reducing the size of the Royal Navy and rejecting the idea of broken back conventional or limited nuclear war in the Atlantic. The Labour defence doctrine was one of tighter nuclear deterrence with the main armament, tactical nuclear and anti-submarine emphasis. Norfolk did not really fit with this strategy and was built to keep shipyards open and as a low level cruiser for low level defence, diplomacy, third world bushfire wars and recruitment. Eventually such ships could be sold to the third world to aid British interests in South America, the Middle East and Asia where Britain was withdrawing its own forces.

== Royal Navy service ==
Dutch newsreel video of HMS Norfolk visiting Amsterdam in 1976

Norfolk was first commissioned on 7 March 1970 and was present at Portsmouth Navy Days. In 1972 Norfolk began a refit to replace 'B' turret with four Exocet launchers. She was thus the first Royal Navy warship to be armed with the Exocet missile system. She also became the first warship to carry three independent missile systems: Exocet, Sea Cat and Sea Slug. Norfolk recommissioned in 1974. She had a displacement of 6,200 tons and was quite a large ship, considering she was classified as a destroyer. She undertook numerous deployments to the Indian Ocean, Mediterranean Sea and South Pacific Ocean. By the mid-1970s it was clear that the Mk 2 Sea Slug did not represent a significant improvement over the earlier version, because it was even less reliable and attempts to develop successful sustainer motors had failed. There was only money to fit new computer command and control to the three other second group County class, so Norfolk was reduced to increasingly marginal and third line roles.

In September 1976, one of the highlights of her relatively peaceful career came, when she flew the Queen's Colour in Sweden and King Carl XVI Gustaf unveiled a plaque to commemorate the British Admiral James de Saumarez. During the ship's visit to Fremantle, Australia in 1979, she had an unwelcome milestone – she became the first warship afloat to hold a Court Martial in over 10 years. The visit itself was made to commemorate 150 years of the founding of Western Australia.

In September 1976, Norfolk took over the UK's commitment to Standing Naval Force Atlantic. She decommissioned in 1981 to become the Dartmouth Training Ship at Britannia Royal Naval College. Now of marginal naval value in the North Atlantic with even the Exocets being a light short ranged missile compared with the Soviets, Norfolk was inevitably a candidate for early pay off to be sold to third world or Commonwealth countries. She was first offered to New Zealand about the start of 1981. Its main selling point was seaworthiness, good range and current datalinks giving interoperability with both the RN and USN.

== Chilean Navy service ==
Norfolk was sold to Chile on 6 April 1982 and renamed Capitán Prat, after Arturo Prat, commander of the Chilean ship Esmeralda during the War of the Pacific. In 1996, her Sea Cat launchers were removed and she was fitted with the Barak SAM. In 2001, her Sea Slug system was removed and she was refitted as a Helicopter Destroyer with a Cougar attack helicopter.

On 24 February 2006, Capitán Prat was laid up; she was decommissioned on 11 August 2006. In September 2008, she sailed to Mexico for scrap.

== Commanding officers ==
Notable commanding officers include JWD Cook (1971–1972), Anthony J Whetstone (1977–1978) and A D Hutton (1978–1980).

== Publications ==
- Colledge, J. J.; Warlow, Ben (2006) [1969]. Ships of the Royal Navy: The Complete Record of All Fighting Ships of the Royal Navy from the 15th Century to the Present (3rd Rev ed.). London: Chatham Publishing. ISBN 978-1-86176-281-8. OCLC 67375475.
- Marriott, Leo, 1989. Royal Navy Destroyers since 1945, Ian Allan Ltd. ISBN 0 7110 1817 0
- McCart, Neil, 2014. County Class Guided Missile Destroyers, Maritime Books. ISBN 978-1904459637
