= HMS Dalrymple =

1948 Bay-class anti-aircraft frigate of the Royal Navy

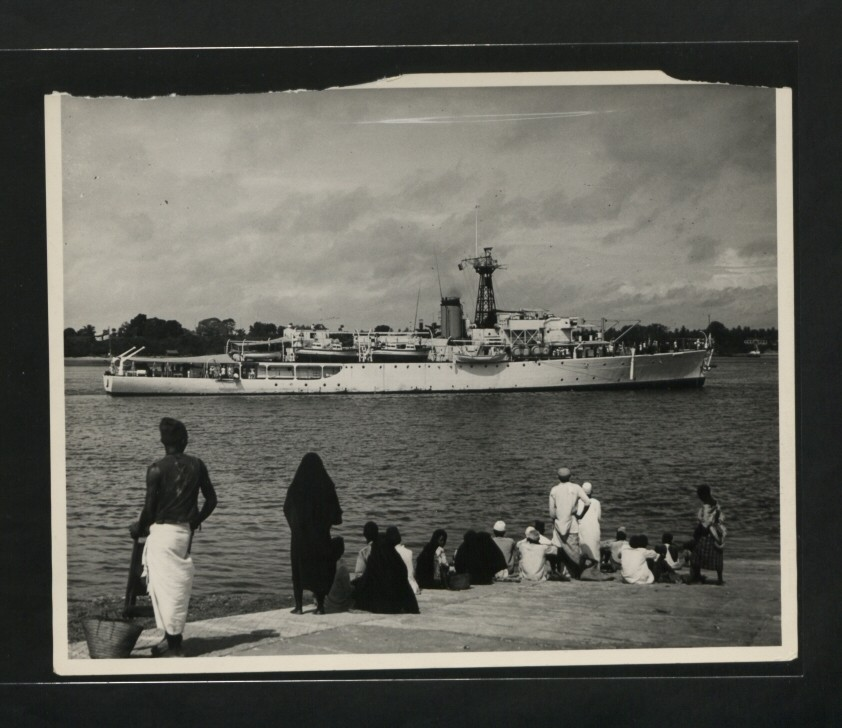
- HMS Dalrymple in Tanganyika

History

United Kingdom
- Name: HMS Dalrymple
- Namesake: Alexander Dalrymple
- Ordered: 25 January 1943
- Builder: William Pickersgill & Sons Ltd., South Bank, Middlesbrough
- Yard number: 263
- Laid down: 29 April 1944
- Launched: 12 April 1945
- Commissioned: 10 February 1948
- Decommissioned: 2 February 1966
- Identification: Pennant number K427//A302
- Fate: Sold to Portugal, March 1966
- Badge: On a Field White, nine lozenges conjoined in saltire Red

Portugal
- Name: NRP Afonso de Albuquerque
- Acquired: March 1966
- Decommissioned: 14 January 1983
- Identification: A526
- Fate: Expended as a target July 1994

General characteristics
- Class & type: Bay-class frigate
- Displacement: 1,600 long tons (1,626 t) standard; 2,530 long tons (2,571 t) full
- Length: 286 ft (87 m) p/p; 307 ft 3 in (93.65 m) o/a
- Beam: 38 ft 6 in (11.73 m)
- Draught: 12 ft 9 in (3.89 m)
- Propulsion: 2 × Admiralty 3-drum boilers, 2 shafts, 4-cylinder vertical triple expansion reciprocating engines, 5,500 ihp (4,100 kW)
- Speed: 19.5 knots (36.1 km/h; 22.4 mph)
- Range: 724 tons oil fuel, 9,500 nmi (17,600 km) at 12 knots (22 km/h)
- Complement: 133
- Armament: 4 × 3-pounder saluting guns; Minesweeping gear aft

HMS Dalrymple was a Bay-class anti-aircraft frigate of the British Royal Navy, which served as a survey ship, mostly in the Persian Gulf, from 1948 until 1965. She was completed to deal with the large numbers of uncharted wrecks and mines around the British Isles as a result of World War II. For this purpose she was fitted for minesweeping. She was named for the pioneering Hydrographer of the Admiralty Alexander Dalrymple (1737–1808).

== Construction ==
The ship was originally ordered from William Pickersgill & Sons Ltd. of Southwick, Sunderland, on 25 January 1943 as the Loch-class frigate Loch Glass. However the contract was changed in 1944, and the ship was laid down as Admiralty Job Number 4795 on 29 April 1944 to a revised design as a Bay-class anti-aircraft frigate, and launched on 12 April 1945 as Luce Bay. After launching the contract was terminated and the ship was towed to Devonport Dockyard for completion, but while fitting out it was decided to complete her as a survey ship. In January 1947 her name was changed to Dalrymple and her pennant number to A302. She was completed on 10 February 1948.

Four vessels, originally intended as Loch-class frigates were converted to survey ships. HMS Dalrymple was named for Alexander Dalrymple (1737–1808) the first Hydrographer of the Royal Navy. The other three were Dampier [after explorer of Australia William Dampier (1651–1715)], Cook [after the historic figure of Captain James Cook (1728–1779)] and Owen (after William Fitzwilliam Owen (1774–1857) RN commander and a global explorer].

== Service history ==
Dalrymple was commissioned for service on 10 February 1948, initially under the command of Captain Archibald Day, and after sea trials sailed for the Mediterranean. She spent much of her career in the Persian Gulf, often with sister ship Owen, as well as carrying out extensive surveys of the Grand Harbour at Valletta, the Malta Channel and the Strait of Sicily. She also spent some time in the Indian Ocean, mostly working around Zanzibar. During "Operation Musketeer" (the Suez invasion) in late 1956, she was deployed at Port Said, clearing obstructions from the Suez Canal.

In 1957 Dalrymple operated off the West Coast of Scotland, carrying out trials of a new radio-location system, before being extensively refitted, with improved radar, working spaces, messing and crew accommodation. Dalrymple then returned to the Persian Gulf for further surveys. She also operated off Cyprus in 1962, and served as Guard ship at Gan in the Maldives in early 1963. She then returned to the UK, remaining in home waters and surveying the North-West Approaches, particularly around Rockall and the coast of Northern Ireland. She was put into Reserve on 2 February 1966 and placed on Disposal List.

Dalrymple was sold to Portugal in March 1966, who had already bought four other frigates of the same class (Bigbury Bay, Burghead Bay, Morecambe Bay and Mounts Bay), and renamed NRP Afonso de Albuquerque. She was used as a survey ship, operating on the Portuguese coast and around the Azores and the Madeira Islands. Decommissioned on 14 January 1983, the ship was used as an accommodation ship at Lisbon Dockyard up until 1988. She was expended as a target in July 1994.

== Publications ==
Colledge, J. J.; Warlow, Ben (2006) [1969]. Ships of the Royal Navy: The Complete Record of All Fighting Ships of the Royal Navy from the 15th Century to the Present (3rd Rev ed.). London: Chatham Publishing. ISBN 978-1-86176-281-8. OCLC 67375475.
