= David Haslam (Royal Navy officer) =

Rear-Admiral Sir David Haslam KBE CB
- Born: 26 June 1923; Derby
- Died: 4 August 2009 (aged 86); Bromsgrove
- Military career
- Allegiance: United Kingdom
- Branch: Royal Navy
- Service years: 1941 to 1985
- Rank: Rear-Admiral
- Awards: Knight Commander of the Order of the British Empire 1984; Companion of the Order of the Bath 1979

Rear-Admiral Sir David William Haslam KBE CB (26 June 1923 – 4 August 2009) was a Royal Navy officer.

David Haslam was born in Derby and educated at Ashe Preparatory School, Etwall and, from 1936, at Bromsgrove School, Worcestershire (from 1939 the school was evacuated to Llanwrtyd Wells in Wales).

He joined the Royal Navy as a Special Entry Cadet in 1941. He saw service in the cruiser HMS Birmingham, in the destroyer HMS Quickmatch and in the battleship HMS Resolution, in the Indian Ocean, between 1942 and 1943. In 1944 he specialised in hydrographic surveying and joined HMS White Bear for surveys in waters off Burma and Malaya between 1944 and 1946.

He was in command of Survey Motor Launch 325 in 1947 and then spent two years on exchange service with the Royal Australian Navy from 1947 to 1949. This was followed by service in the surveying vessel HMS Scott from 1949 to 1951 and her sister ship HMS Dalrymple 1951–53.

After a period in command of the Royal Navy Survey Training Unit at Chatham from 1953 to 1956, as a Lieutenant-Commander, he was First Lieutenant of the new survey vessel HMS Vidal until 1957. Promoted to commander at the age of 34, he then had a succession of survey ship commands: HMS Dalrymple in 1958, HMS Dampier 1958-60 and HMS Owen 1962–64, the period from 1960 to 1962 being spent in the Admiralty. He was appointed OBE in 1964.

He was then appointed, in 1964, as the Executive Officer of HMS Pembroke, the Royal Naval Barracks in Chatham, later serving as Hydrographer of the Royal Australian Navy from 1965 to 1967, during which time he was promoted to captain.

Back in the United Kingdom, he took command of the new survey vessel HMS Hecla from 1968 to 1970 before becoming Assistant Hydrographer of the Navy in the Ministry of Defence, from 1970 to 1972. His final sea command - his sixth - was HMS Hydra from March 1972 to 1973. While in charge of surveys in the Persian Gulf, he discovered a series of coral pinnacles now known and charted as Haslam's Patches .

He was then an assistant director in the Hydrographic Department at Taunton, from 1973 to 1974 and, in 1975, he undertook the Senior Officers' War Course. Promoted Rear-Admiral on 7 July 1975, he became head of his branch when he took up the historic appointment of Hydrographer of the Navy in September 1975, a position he held, exceptionally, for ten years. He retired from the Royal Navy on 30 March 1985, after 44 years' service.

In retirement, he was busy as Acting Conservator of the River Mersey from 1985 to 1987 and as an adviser on Port Appointments to the Department of Transport from 1986 to 1987. He was President of the Directing Committee of the International Hydrographic Bureau, Monaco, from 1987 to 1992. He was President of the Hydrographic Society from 1977 to 1979.

He was a Governor of his old school, Bromsgrove School, from 1977 to 1997 and, unmarried, he lived literally across the road from the School, in Worcester Road, for many years, and it was at home that he died peacefully.

He was President of the English Schools Basketball Association from 1973 to 1996 and President of Derbyshire County Cricket Club from 1991 to 1992. He was a Liveryman of the Worshipful Company of Chartered Surveyors from 1983, serving also as President of the Land Surveyors Division of the RICS, and also a FRGS, FRICS, FRIN and FRSA.

The funeral took place at Bromsgrove School chapel on 21 August 2009 followed by a cremation at Redditch Crematorium. A memorial service was held on Friday 12 March 2010 at Bromsgrove School chapel.

== Articles ==
- Haslam, David. 1983. "Why a Hydrographic Office?" International Hydrographic Review LXII (1): 7 – 16.

== Obituaries ==
- Derby Telegraph 14 August 2009
- The Times 18 August 2009
