= HMS Whitesand Bay =

1945 Bay-class anti-aircraft frigate of the Royal Navy

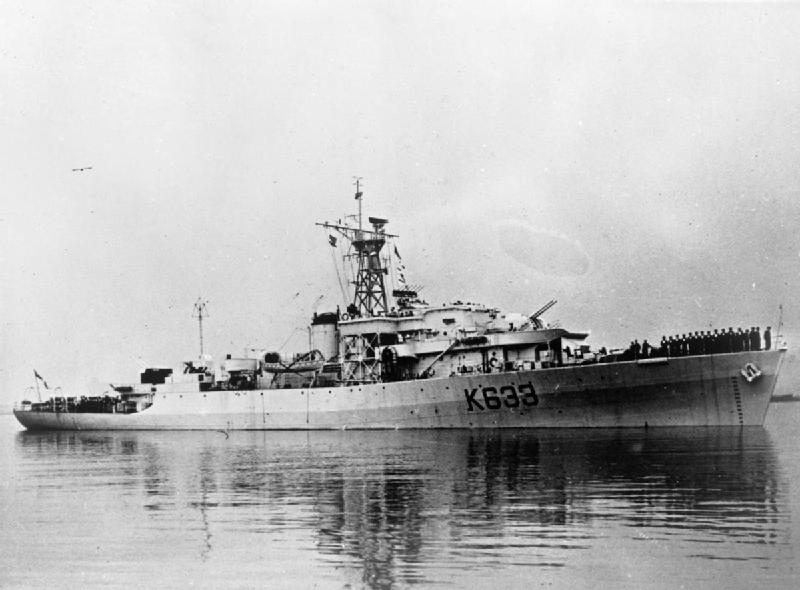
- Whitesand Bay in 1945

History

United Kingdom
- Name: HMS Whitesand Bay
- Namesake: Whitesand Bay, Cornwall
- Ordered: 11 May 1943
- Builder: Harland and Wolff, Belfast
- Yard number: 621
- Laid down: 8 August 1944
- Launched: 16 December 1944
- Completed: 30 July 1945
- Commissioned: July 1945
- Decommissioned: December 1954
- Identification: Pennant number K633/F633
- Honours and awards: Korea 1950-53
- Fate: Sold for scrapping, 1955
- Badge: On a Field Blue, a boar's head erased White, tongued Red

General characteristics
- Class & type: Bay-class frigate
- Displacement: 1,600 long tons (1,626 t) standard; 2,530 long tons (2,571 t) full
- Length: 286 ft (87 m) p/p; 307 ft 3 in (93.65 m) o/a
- Beam: 38 ft 6 in (11.73 m)
- Draught: 12 ft 9 in (3.89 m)
- Propulsion: 2 × Admiralty 3-drum boilers, 2 shafts, 4-cylinder vertical triple expansion reciprocating engines, 5,500 ihp (4,100 kW)
- Speed: 19.5 knots (36.1 km/h; 22.4 mph)
- Range: 724 tons oil fuel, 9,500 nmi (17,600 km) at 12 knots (22 km/h)
- Complement: Frigates: 157 - Despatch vessels: 160 - Survey ships: 133
- Sensors & processing systems: Type 285 fire control radar; Type 291 air warning radar; Type 276 target indication radar; High Frequency Direction Finder (HF/DF); IFF transponder
- Armament: 4 × QF 4 inch Mark XVI guns on 2 twin mounting HA/LA Mk.XIX; 4 × 40 mm Bofors A/A on 2 twin mounts Mk.V; 4 × 20 mm Oerlikon A/A on 2 twin mounts Mk.V; 1 × Hedgehog 24 barrel A/S projector; 2 rails and 4 throwers for 50 depth charges

HMS Whitesand Bay was a Bay-class anti-aircraft frigate of the British Royal Navy, named for Whitesand Bay in Cornwall. In commission from 1945 to 1954, she served in the Pacific, Mediterranean, West Indies and Far East Fleets, seeing active service in the Korean War.

== Construction ==
The ship was originally ordered from Harland and Wolff of Belfast on 11 May 1943 as the Loch-class frigate Loch Lubnaig, and laid down on 8 February 1944 as Admiralty Job Number J3932. However the contract was changed on 5 October 1944, and the ship was completed to a revised design as a Bay-class anti-aircraft frigate, launched on 16 December 1944, and completed on 30 July 1945 with the pennant number K633.

== Service history ==
=== Pacific Fleet ===
Whitesand Bay was commissioned under the command of Lieutenant-Commander B.C. Longbottom for service with the Pacific Escort Force. After sea trials at Tobermory in August, and weapons testing at Portland in September, she sailed on 5 October in company with her sister ship Bigbury Bay. After exercises with ships of Mediterranean Fleet she sailed to Hong Kong, arriving in December 1945.

Whitesand Bay was initially deployed in the South China Sea for patrols and trade defence, including the escort of colliers from French Indochina to Hong Kong. In May 1946 she sailed to Auckland, New Zealand to refit, returning to Hong Kong in August to resume patrol and escort duties. In September she was deployed in the Formosa Strait, returning to Singapore in December.

=== Mediterranean Fleet ===
In March 1947 Whitesand Bay was transferred to the Mediterranean, along with Bigbury Bay, Veryan Bay and Widemouth Bay for attachment to the Palestine Patrol. The ships sailed via Singapore, Trincomalee and Aden, transited the Suez Canal, and arrived at Malta on 22 April to join the 5th Frigate Flotilla of the Mediterranean Fleet. There Lieutenant-Commander R.F.C. O'Sullivan took command of Whitesand Bay and prepared for her new duty which was to intercept, board and detain ships carrying illegal Jewish immigrants to Palestine. Boarding ramps and protective nettings were fitted, and special training for Boarding Parties was carried out. She remained on the Palestine Patrol until March 1948, while based at Haifa.

Whitesand Bay then returned to Malta, and in April was sent to Trieste for guardship duties. She was refitted at HM Dockyard, Malta, from May to June, at which time she received a new Commanding Officer, Lieutenant-Commander J.V. Brothers, and a change of pennant number to F633. In July she took part in the Mediterranean Fleet's Summer Cruise Programme, and carried the Olympic Torch from the Greek island of Corfu to Bari in Italy as part of its journey from Greece to London for the Olympic Games. In August she was at Argostoli for a Regatta, and also visited Bône and Tunis, while in September she was deployed with the Flotilla and visited Sfax and Sorrento.

=== West Indies Fleet ===
Whitesand Bay was transferred to the West Indies Station, sailing from Malta on 20 September 1948, calling at Gibraltar, Madeira, and Horta in the Azores, before arriving at Bermuda on 14 October. There she carried out patrols, made visits to various island ports, and took part in fleet and joint exercises, along with ships of the Royal Canadian and United States Navy.

=== Far East Fleet ===
In July 1949 she transferred to the 4th Frigate Flotilla in the Far East Fleet, transiting the Panama Canal and calling at Pearl Harbor before joining the Flotilla at Hong Kong on 28 August. There she was deployed in patrols off Hong Kong and the Yangtze River, and took part in Flotilla and Fleet exercises. On 9 December she began a refit at the Hong Kong Dockyard, while her crew were accommodated at the naval barracks, HMS Tamar.

Whitesand Bay resumed Flotilla duties on 18 January 1950, taking part in local exercises, and in joint RN/USN exercises in February and March at Subic Bay before sailing to Singapore, where she was deployed for patrols off east coast of Malaya in support of military operations against insurgents. After further exercises and patrols in the Formosa Strait Whitesand Bay refitted at Hong Kong in June–July, before being detached for service with the United Nations off Korea in August.

==== Korean War ====
Whitesand Bay proceeded to Sasebo, Japan, to join the British U.N. Task Group. As part of elaborate deception operations intended to make the enemy believe that a major U.N. amphibious invasion actually planned for Incheon on 15 September 1950 would take place at Kunsan, she landed Royal Marine Commandos and United States Army special forces troops on the docks at Kunsan, with those forces making sure that the enemy noticed their visit. She then deployed with Task Group 90.7 for blockade duty under the command of Commander A. N. Rowell. She returned to Hong Kong in December 1950.

In February 1951 Whitesand Bay sailed to Singapore for support duties off the Malayan coast, supporting of anti-insurgent operations by carrying out inshore patrols and shore bombardments. In May she was deployed off Borneo for anti-piracy patrols, visiting Jesselton and Sandakan. In June she began her second UN operational tour, relieving the Canadian destroyer Sioux in Task Group 95.22 off Wonsan for patrol and bombardment duties. In July she transferred to the west coast and joined the British Task Group, carrying out survey work with other British and Commonwealth ships in the Han River.

After flotilla duties at Hong Kong from August to September, Whitesand Bay returned to Korea in October for her third operational tour. Deployed off the west coast she carried out bombardments in the Han River and supported military operations in the Haeju estuary until February 1952, when she returned to Hong Kong where Commander M.W.B. Craig-Waller took command. Her fourth Korean tour lasted from April to June 1952 where she was again deployed with the Allied Task Group off the west coast for blockade, patrol and support bombardment duties. In July she returned to Hong Kong, then sailed to Singapore in August to refit. After post-refit trials in November she was deployed at Singapore for Flotilla for exercises and local patrol duties, returning to operate on the west coast of Korea in February 1953. In May she returned to Hong Kong for maintenance and to attend Coronation Day ceremonies on 2 June. On 13 June she sailed for Sasebo to begin her sixth and final UN operational tour, sailing to the Haeju estuary to assist in the planned withdrawal of ROK troops. On the 25th the Armistice was declared.

In August she sailed to Kure where Commander M.E. Lashmore assumed command. She returned to Korea in early September to relieve the New Zealand frigate Kaniere as guardship off Yong Pyong Do. She returned to Sasebo at the end of the month, then went on to Hong Kong before being deployed in the Formosa Straits Patrol until November. Between December and February 1954 she was refitted at Hong Kong Dockyard. Resuming Flotilla duties on 8 March, she again patrolled the Formosa Strait, and acted as guardship at Pang Yong Do into April. Returning to Singapore in May she took part in patrols, escort duty and exercises before sailing for the UK, arriving at Portsmouth on 24 August.

=== Decommissioning and disposal ===
Under her new Commanding Officer, Commander D.N. Forbes, Whitesand Bay was prepared for Home Fleet service, however in December she was paid off and the ship's company was transferred to the frigate Loch Killisport, then refitting at Chatham Dockyard.
