= HMS Morecambe Bay =

Bay-class anti-aircraft frigate of the Royal Navy and Portuguese Navy

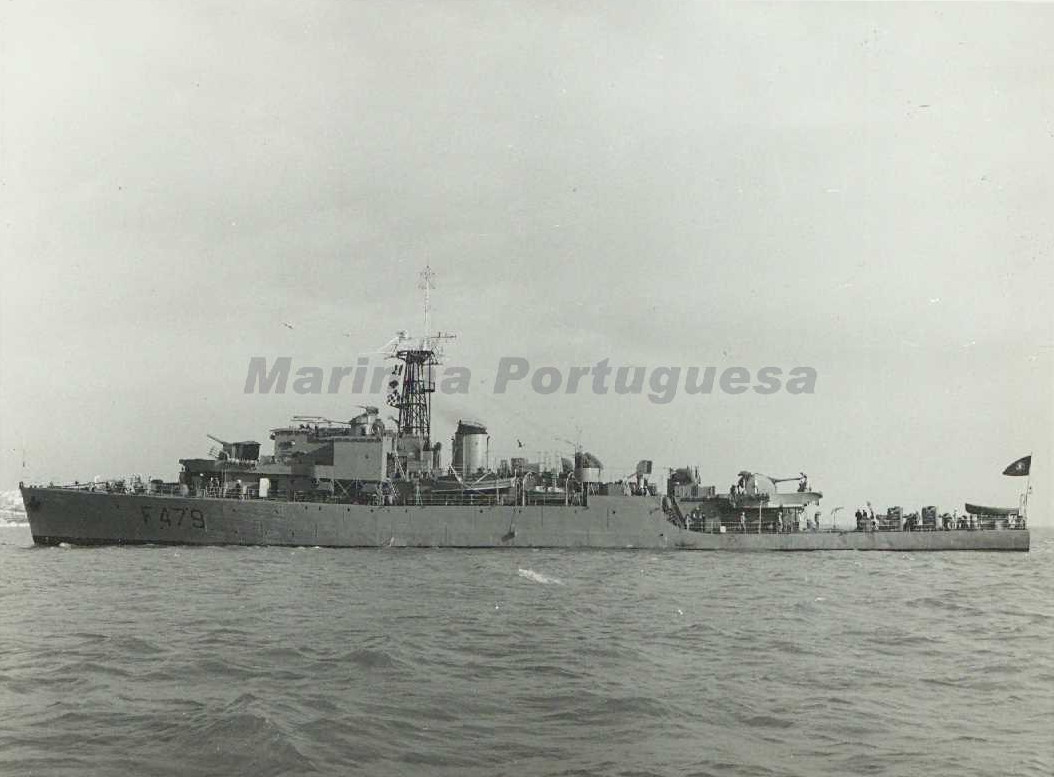
- HMS Morecambe Bay as NRP Dom Francisco de Almeida

History

United Kingdom
- Name: HMS Morecambe Bay
- Namesake: Morecambe Bay
- Ordered: 19 January 1943
- Builder: William Pickersgill & Sons Ltd., Southwick, Sunderland
- Yard number: 266
- Laid down: 30 April 1944
- Launched: 1 November 1944
- Commissioned: 22 February 1949
- Decommissioned: 19 November 1956
- Identification: Pennant number K624
- Honours and awards: Korea 1950-53
- Fate: Sold to Portugal, 9 May 1961
- Badge: On a Field White, White 4 pallets wavy blue, a red rose barbed and seeded proper.

Portugal
- Name: NRP Dom Francisco de Almeida
- Namesake: Francisco de Almeida
- Acquired: 3 August 1961
- Identification: F479
- Fate: Scrapped, 1970

General characteristics
- Class & type: Bay-class frigate
- Displacement: 1,600 long tons (1,626 t) standard; 2,530 long tons (2,571 t) full
- Length: 286 ft (87 m) p/p; 307 ft 3 in (93.65 m) o/a
- Beam: 38 ft 6 in (11.73 m)
- Draught: 12 ft 9 in (3.89 m)
- Propulsion: 2 × Admiralty 3-drum boilers, 2 shafts, 4-cylinder vertical triple expansion reciprocating engines, 5,500 ihp (4,100 kW)
- Speed: 19.5 knots (36.1 km/h; 22.4 mph)
- Range: 724 tons oil fuel, 9,500 nmi (17,600 km) at 12 knots (22 km/h)
- Complement: 157
- Sensors & processing systems: Type 285 fire control radar; Type 291 air warning radar; Type 276 target indication radar; High Frequency Direction Finder (HF/DF); IFF transponder
- Armament: 4 × QF 4 inch Mark XVI guns on 2 twin mounting HA/LA Mk.XIX; 4 × 40 mm Bofors A/A on 2 twin mounts Mk.V; 4 × 20 mm Oerlikon A/A on 2 twin mounts Mk.V; 1 × Hedgehog 24 barrel A/S projector; 2 rails and 4 throwers for 50 depth charges

HMS Morecambe Bay was a Bay-class anti-aircraft frigate of the British Royal Navy, named after Morecambe Bay on the north western coast of England. In commission from 1949 until 1956, she saw active service in the Korean War, and was sold to Portugal in 1961 to serve as NRP Dom Francisco de Almeida until 1970.

== Construction ==
The ship was originally ordered from William Pickersgill & Sons Ltd. of Southwick, Sunderland, on 19 January 1943 as the Loch-class frigate Loch Heilen. However, the contract was then changed, and the ship was laid down on 30 April 1944 to a revised design as a Bay class. Admiralty Job No. J4802 (Yard No. 266) was launched as Morecambe Bay on 1 November 1944. Work on the ship was suspended in August 1945 after the cessation of hostilities, and she ship was laid up at the builder's yard. Finally, in 1948, the ship was towed to the shipyard of J. Samuel White at Cowes, where she was completed.

== Service history ==
=== Malaya ===
Morecambe Bay was commissioned on 22 February 1949 under the command of Lieutenant-Commander K.R.S Leadley. However, post-war demobilisation meant that there was a shortage of personnel, and it was not until July that she had her full complement. In August she was detailed to serve with the Far East Fleet under the command of Commander C.C.B. Mackenzie, and sailed for Malta in September. She exercised with Mediterranean Fleet ships in October, before sailing to Singapore, arriving on 21 November to join the 4th Frigate Flotilla (later the 4th Frigate Squadron) in patrols and anti-insurgent operations on the coast of Malaya during the Malayan Emergency.

=== Korea ===
On the outbreak of the Korean War in June 1950 Morecambe Bay was nominated for service with the United Nations Naval Task Force based at Sasebo, Japan. She was deployed in October for bombardment and patrol duties off the west coast of Korea with other Commonwealth ships, including sister ship Mounts Bay, and the New Zealand frigates Pukaki and Tutira. In November she was deployed with Task Group 95.13 in minesweeping operations off the west coast, and in December was deployed in support of evacuation of Inchon with CTG 95.12, while under the command of Commander J.J.E. Famol. In January 1951 she left Korean waters and rejoined the flotilla at Hong Kong for Yangtze Patrol and flotilla exercises.

In June Morecambe Bay began her second operational tour off Korea, supporting raids by Korean troops in the Haeju and Chojin area. In July she was attached to United States Navy Task Group 95.12 to assist in bombardments off the east coast of Korea supporting allied troops ashore, receiving a congratulatory signal from the Commander of the U.S. 7th Fleet Vice Admiral Harold M. Martin. She was then transferred to the Royal Navy Task Group on the west coast, and employed in operations off the Han River with the frigates Cardigan Bay and Mounts Bay in support of military operations to ensure access to Seoul, and in shore bombardments. Relieved from UN duties Morecambe Bay rejoined the flotilla in September for further anti-insurgent patrol duties, then refitted at Singapore in December.

In January 1952 she carried out patrols of the Malacca Strait and supported anti-insurgent operations. In February she sailed to Sasebo for her third operational UN tour, deployed with CTG 95.22 in the Sonjin and Chojin areas off the east coast. In July Commander J.A.H. Hamer took command, and she sailed in August to Sasebo for her fourth Korean tour. In September she was deployed off the west coast for island patrols and support, then off the East coast in October, and returned to Hong Kong in November.

Morecambe Bay returned to Korea in May 1953, and while operating off Ch'o do Island off the west coast of North Korea with a US Navy Landing Ship, came under enemy fire, while counter-fire was provided by the battleship USS New Jersey. In June she provided a guard for the rededication of War Grave cemetery at Kobe in Japan. In August her tour in Korea ended and she sailed to Hong Kong to refit. After exercises, she was deployed as guardship at Pangyong Do from 31 October, and carried out patrol and gunfire support duties. On 9 December she was relieved by the destroyer Comus and took passage to Kure, then to Hong Kong for fleet exercises.

In January 1954 she was deployed in operations and patrols off Malaya, taking part in fleet exercises in February, before sailing to Hong Kong for maintenance, and a new CO, Commander A.C. Tupper. In April she patrolled the Pearl River, and the Formosa Strait, returning to Korea at the end of May for patrol and guardship duties, before returning to Singapore for a major refit in July, during which the crew were temporarily transferred to HMS Terror – the naval barracks at Singapore Naval Base.

=== West Indies ===
In September, after a shakedown cruise off Singapore, Morecambe Bay sailed for the Caribbean to join the West Indies Squadron, calling at Yokosuka, Pearl Harbor, San Francisco, San Diego, Acapulco, Puerto San José, Guatemala, and Balboa, Panama, before transiting the Panama Canal on 20 December, arriving at Kingston, Jamaica three days later.

In January 1955 she joined the cruisers Superb and the Canadian Quebec, the frigates Bigbury Bay and Burghead Bay, and other NATO warships for exercises, then returned to the UK, arriving back at Portsmouth on 2 February. After an extensive refit she was put back in commission on 31 July for service on America and West Indies Station under the command of Commander T.C. Meyrick. After trials and weapons calibration she sailed for Bermuda, arriving on 30 September. In October and November she visited various Caribbean island ports, then in December she took part in joint exercises with the cruiser HMS Kenya and ships of the United States.

The year 1956 was spent in an extensive series of visits to ports in Central America, and of the United States, as well as a major multi-national exercise in June with USN, RN, Canadian and Dutch ships. Finally, in September, Morecambe Bay returned to the UK, was decommissioned on 19 November 1956.

=== Sold to Portugal ===
On 9 May 1961 the frigate was sold to Portugal. She served until scrapped in September 1970.

== Publications ==
- Colledge, J. J.; Warlow, Ben (2006) [1969]. Ships of the Royal Navy: The Complete Record of All Fighting Ships of the Royal Navy from the 15th Century to the Present (3rd Rev ed.). London: Chatham Publishing. ISBN 978-1-86176-281-8. OCLC 67375475.
