= Largo =

Largo may refer to:

== Music ==
- Largo (Italian for 'wide', 'broad'), a very slow tempo, or a musical piece or movement in such a tempo
- "Largo" from Xerxes arranged from "Ombra mai fu", the opening aria from Handel's opera Serse
- "Largo" from Part II of Symphony_No.9 by Dvořák
- Hugo Largo, an American band from the 1980s
- Largo (Brad Mehldau album), 2002
- Largo (Americana album), a 1998 Americana music project produced by Rick Chertoff and Rob Hyman
- Zeit (Tangerine Dream album), subtitled Largo in Four Movements, a 1972 album by Tangerine Dream
- "Largo", a song from Fiona Apple's album The Idler Wheel...

== Places ==
=== Bulgaria ===
- Largo, Sofia, an architectural ensemble of three Socialist Classicism edifices

=== Italy ===
- Largo di Torre Argentina, a square in Rome

=== Scotland ===
- Largo, Fife, an ecclesiastical and civil parish of Fife, Scotland
  - Adjacent villages in the parish of Largo, Scotland
    - Lower Largo
    - Upper Largo
  - Largo Bay, on the coast of Fife
  - Largo Law, an extinct volcano in Fife
  - Largo railway station, a former station in Fife

=== United States ===
- Key Largo, an island in the Florida Keys, USA
- Largo, Florida
- Largo, Maryland, a suburb of Washington, D.C.

== Characters ==
- Largo (Megatokyo), one of the lead characters in the webcomic Megatokyo
- Largo Winch, a comic book series and its eponymous character
  - Largo Winch (TV series), adaptation of the comic book series
  - Largo Winch (film), a 2008 adaptation of the comic book series
- Emilio Largo and Maximillian Largo, characters from the James Bond series of novels and films
- Largo LaGrande, a minor character in the Monkey Island series of adventure games
- Mr. Largo, a character from The Simpsons
- Largo the Black Lion, the main villain in Tales of the Abyss
- Largo Slime, a mixed slime in Slime Rancher

== Other uses ==
- 9×23mm Largo, a centerfire pistol cartridge
- HMS Largo Bay (K423), Bay-class anti-aircraft frigate of the British navy
- Largo (nightclub) in Los Angeles, California
- Largo High School (disambiguation)
- Nissan Largo, people-mover automobile made by Nissan

== See also ==
- Live at Largo (disambiguation)
