= Wigtown Bay =

Large inlet of the Irish Sea in southwest Scotland

Coordinates: 54°48′N 4°18′W

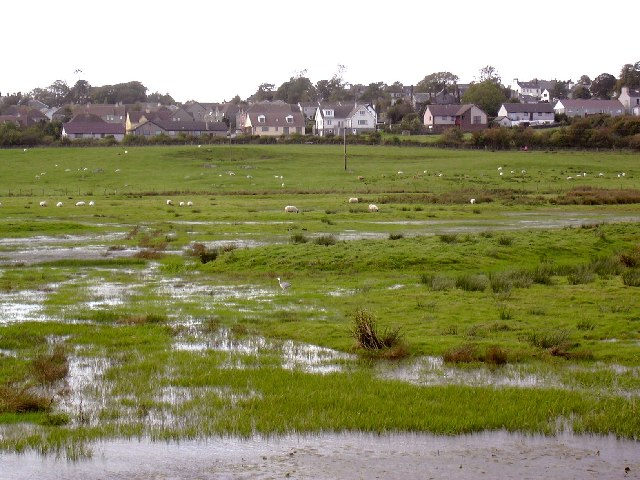
Wigtown Bay Nature Reserve

Wigtown Bay (Scottish Gaelic: Bàgh Bhaile na h-Ùige) is a large inlet of the Irish Sea on the coast of Galloway in southwest Scotland. Its coastline falls entirely within the modern administrative area of Dumfries and Galloway and shared between the historical counties of Wigtownshire and Kirkcudbrightshire.

The Bay is broadly triangular in shape, widening toward the southeast, with the estuary of the River Cree entering from the northwest at its head. The inner parts of the bay are characterized by extensive areas of salt marsh and mudflats. The River Bladnoch joins the estuarial section of the Cree near Wigtown, while the Water of Fleet forms a third significant river, entering Wigtown Bay via Fleet Bay on the eastern shore. At the mouth of Fleet Bay lie the Islands of Fleet, which include Ardwall Island, Barlocco Isle, and Murray’s Isles.

The western shore of the bay is defined by the Machars peninsula, which is indented by Rigg (or Cruggleton) Bay and Garlieston Bay, the latter hosting the village of Garlieston. The small town of Wigtown stands on the western side of the bay, while the village of Creetown lies at its northern head.

Wigtown Bay constitutes the largest local nature reserve in the United Kingdom. It has also been designated a Site of Special Scientific Interest due to its ecological importance.

In early 2011, a proposal to construct an offshore wind farm within Wigtown Bay was rejected by the Scottish Government, citing potential adverse effects on tourism as a principal reason for the decision.

== Naval connections ==
The design of the floating Mulberry Harbour used in the successful invasion of Normandy by allied forces during the Second World War was tested in the bay where conditions were felt to be suitably similar to those of the Normandy coast. There was also a World War II Bay class frigate named Wigtown Bay
