= HMS Porlock Bay =

Bay-class anti-aircraft frigate of the Royal Navy and Finnish Navy

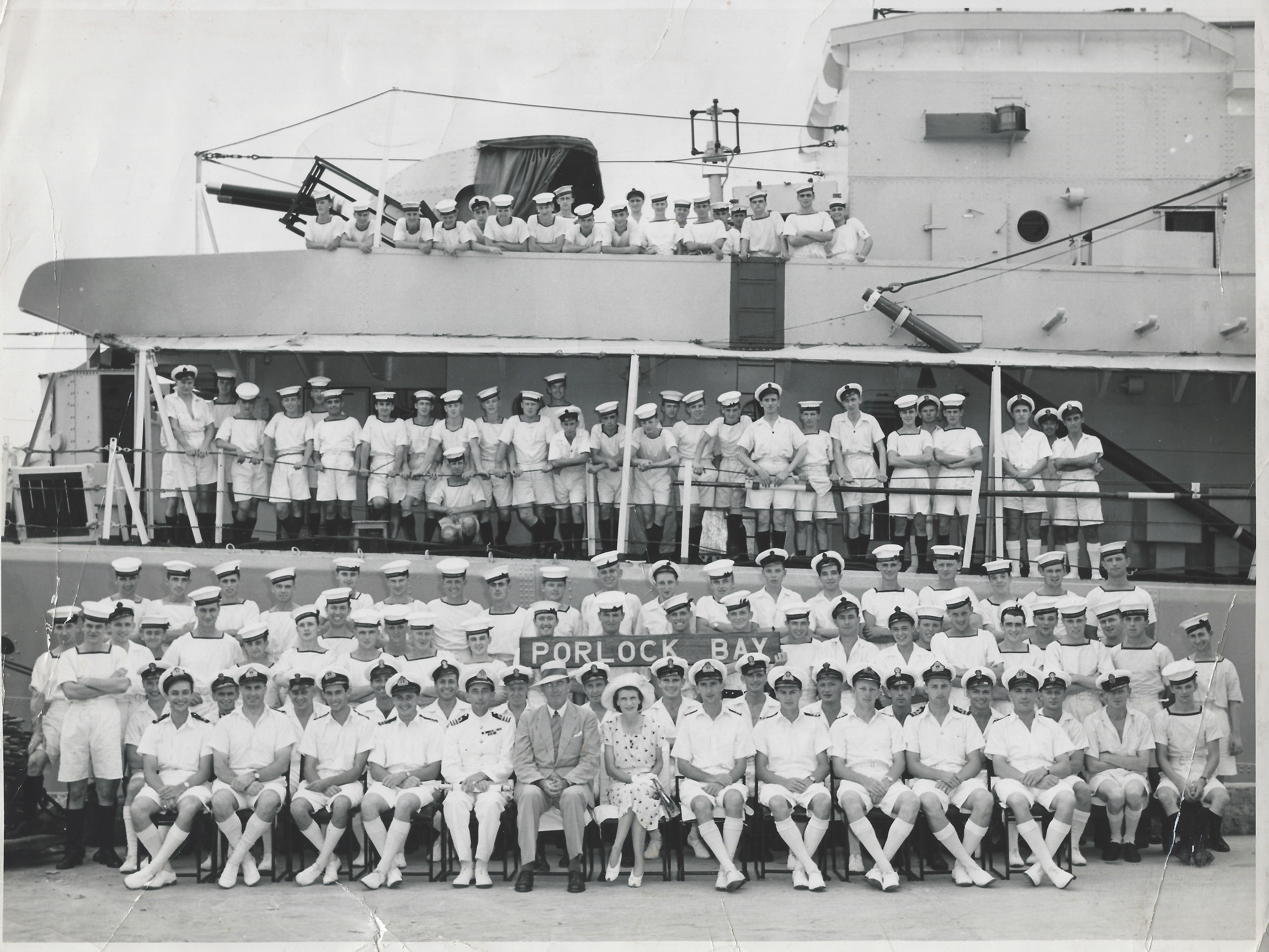
- HMS Porlock Bay in the Bahamas in 1946

History

United Kingdom
- Name: HMS Porlock Bay
- Builder: Charles Hill & Sons, Bristol
- Yard number: 302
- Laid down: 22 November 1944
- Launched: 14 June 1945
- Completed: 8 March 1946
- Commissioned: 14 February 1946
- Decommissioned: January 1949
- Identification: Pennant number K650; F650 from February 1949
- Motto: Virtute et Veritate ("With virtue and truth")
- Fate: Sold to Finland, 19 March 1962
- Badge: On a field quarterly gold and red, in base barruly wavy of four white and blue, an oak tree fructed proper

Finland
- Name: Matti Kurki
- Namesake: Matti Kurki
- Acquired: 19 March 1962
- Commissioned: 1962
- Decommissioned: 1975
- Fate: Sold for demolition in September 1975; final stripping carried out in 1976

General characteristics As built
- Class & type: Bay-class frigate
- Displacement: 1,600 long tons (1,626 t) standard; 2,530 long tons (2,571 t) full load
- Length: 286 ft (87 m) between perpendiculars; 307 ft 3 in (93.65 m) overall
- Beam: 38 ft 6 in (11.73 m)
- Draught: 12 ft 9 in (3.89 m)
- Propulsion: 2 × Admiralty three-drum boilers; 2 shafts; 2 × four-cylinder vertical triple-expansion steam engines; 5,500 ihp (4,100 kW)
- Speed: 19.5 knots (36.1 km/h; 22.4 mph)
- Range: 9,500 nmi (17,600 km) at 12 knots (22 km/h)
- Complement: 157 in Royal Navy service; approximately 140 in Finnish service
- Sensors & processing systems: Type 285 fire-control radar; Type 291 air-warning radar; Type 276 target-indication radar; HF/DF; IFF transponder
- Armament: 4 × QF 4-inch Mk XVI guns in two twin HA/LA Mk XIX mountings; 4 × 40 mm Bofors guns in two twin Mk V mountings; 4 × 20 mm Oerlikon guns in two twin mountings; 1 × Hedgehog 24-barrel anti-submarine projector; 4 × depth-charge throwers; 2 × depth-charge rails; 50 × depth charges

HMS Porlock Bay was a Bay-class anti-aircraft frigate of the British Royal Navy. She was completed shortly after the end of the Second World War and served on the North America and West Indies Station and with the Fishery Protection Squadron before being placed in reserve in 1949. The ship was sold to Finland in 1962 and renamed Matti Kurki. She served as the principal seagoing training ship of the Finnish Navy from 1962 until 1974. After the end of her seagoing career, she was used as a stationary training and accommodation ship at the Finnish Naval Academy in Suomenlinna. She was sold for demolition in 1975, with final stripping taking place in 1976.

== Design and construction ==
The Bay-class frigates were developed during the later stages of the Second World War. They used essentially the same prefabricated hull as the preceding Loch-class, but carried an anti-aircraft armament intended for operations in the Far East, where aircraft were considered a greater threat than submarines. Porlock Bay was ordered from Charles Hill & Sons of Bristol in 1944 in place of the proposed Loch-class frigate Loch Seaforth, whose order had been cancelled. She was laid down as yard number 302 on 22 November 1944, launched on 14 June 1945 and completed on 8 March 1946. She was the first Royal Navy ship to bear the name, which referred to Porlock Bay on the northern coast of Somerset, and was the last warship completed by the Charles Hill shipyard. The ship displaced 1,600 long tons (1,626 t) at standard load and 2,530 long tons (2,571 t) at full load. Her two four-cylinder triple-expansion steam engines produced a total of 5,500 ihp (4,100 kW) and gave a maximum speed of approximately 19.5 knots (36.1 km/h; 22.4 mph). With 724 tons of oil fuel, she had a range of about 9,500 nmi (17,600 km) at 12 knots (22 km/h). Her main armament consisted of four 4-inch (100 mm) QF Mk XVI guns in two twin mountings. The anti-aircraft armament comprised two twin 40 mm (1.6 in) Bofors mountings and two twin 20 mm (0.79 in) Oerlikon mountings. Anti-submarine weapons included a Hedgehog projector, four depth-charge throwers and two depth-charge rails.

== Royal Navy service ==
Porlock Bay was commissioned on 14 February 1946 under Lieutenant D. L. Davenport for service on the North America and West Indies Station. Following weapons trials and working-up at Portland, she was temporarily attached to the Plymouth Local Flotilla. Her departure for the West Indies was delayed by post-war personnel shortages. On 22 July 1946, she sailed for Bermuda together with her sister ship Padstow Bay. After calling at the Azores, the ships continued towards Bermuda while towing the disabled landing craft headquarters ship LCH 50. Porlock Bay collided with the landing craft while the tow was being disconnected and suffered damage to her bow. Repairs in Bermuda prevented her from joining planned visits to ports in the United States. After repairs, the frigate sailed to St. John's, arriving on 7 September. Later that month, she carried the Governor of Newfoundland, Sir Gordon Macdonald, on an official tour of isolated communities on Newfoundland's southern coast. She subsequently visited ports in Newfoundland and eastern Canada and exercised with ships of the Royal Canadian Navy before returning to Bermuda in November for maintenance. Commander Frank Twiss assumed command during the refit. In early 1947, Porlock Bay participated in exercises and made visits to Veracruz, Galveston, Mobile, Key West and Nassau. During July, she supported an official tour by the Governor of the Bahamas to the Turks and Caicos Islands and other islands. She was subsequently sent to Belize during a period of tension caused by Guatemalan territorial claims. In September 1947, the ship was informed that her overseas commission was to be ended as part of post-war spending reductions. After calls at Santiago de Cuba and Miami, she returned through Bermuda and reached Devonport on 3 November. She served with the Fishery Protection Squadron in British waters throughout 1948 and was reduced to reserve at Devonport in January 1949. Her pennant number was changed from K650 to F650 the following month. She remained in reserve, receiving two refits, until her sale to Finland in 1962.

== Finnish Navy service ==
=== Acquisition ===
In the late 1950s, the Finnish Navy sought a replacement for its former sail training ship, Suomen Joutsen. The British offer of the reserve frigate Porlock Bay was selected as a comparatively inexpensive interim solution while plans for a purpose-built Finnish training ship remained unresolved. The evaluation identified several disadvantages. The ship was not strengthened for operations in ice, and her British-built 102 mm (4.0 in) guns used ammunition that was not interchangeable with the Finnish Navy's existing ammunition. Nevertheless, her range, accommodation and seaworthiness made her suitable for extended training voyages. Her normal Finnish complement was approximately 140. The ship was sold to Finland in March 1962 and renamed Matti Kurki, after the legendary Finnish chieftain Matti Kurki. A Finnish crew commanded by Commander Matts Wikberg took her over for the delivery voyage on 19 April 1962. The ship was received ceremonially at the naval base at Pansio, Turku, and was subsequently presented to government officials, military personnel and the public in Helsinki.

=== Training ship ===
Matti Kurki served as the Finnish Navy's seagoing training ship from 1962 to 1974. Her accommodation allowed naval cadets, reservists and conscripts to receive practical instruction in navigation, seamanship, shipboard organisation and operations during extended voyages outside the Baltic Sea. Finnish sources use different classifications when counting her voyages. The Finnish Navy's centenary history and Forum Marinum record fourteen foreign or long training cruises, while the Naval Academy's history lists fifteen training cruises. A broader account in Suomenmaa, which also includes other long overseas voyages, gives a total of sixteen. Her voyages included visits to Denmark, Sweden, Norway, Poland, the Soviet Union, Britain, France, the Netherlands, Iceland, Malta, Italy, Turkey, the United States and Canada. The Naval Academy's history identifies an eight-week voyage to Sevastopol in 1963 and a twelve-week voyage to Halifax in 1967 as her longest training cruises. Although old-fashioned by the standards of the 1960s, Matti Kurki was considered highly seaworthy. Her acquisition also gave the post-war Finnish Navy experience in operating a comparatively large ocean-going warship.

=== Stationary service and disposal ===
The ship's final seagoing training season was in 1974. Thereafter she was stationed at the Finnish Naval Academy in Suomenlinna and used as a fixed training facility and as accommodation for naval courses. Her ageing boilers and the cost of replacing or converting the steam propulsion system made continued seagoing operation uneconomical. Matti Kurki was removed from service in 1975 and sold for demolition in September. She spent her final months at Upinniemi in 1976, where equipment and furnishings were removed before the remaining hull was dismantled.

== Legacy ==
Furniture from the ship's officers' mess was transferred to the Finnish Naval Academy and remains in use in the academy's Matti Kurki mess and conference room. One of the ship's propellers was initially displayed outside the garrison officers' club at Upinniemi. In 2019 it was moved to the courtyard of the Naval Academy's D12 building in Suomenlinna. The ship's Hedgehog anti-submarine projector, known in Finnish service as Siili, is held in the collection of the Forum Marinum maritime museum in Turku. Other surviving items include anchors, radio-room equipment and shipboard furnishings. The Finnish Navy's next purpose-built seagoing training ship was the minelayer Pohjanmaa, completed in 1979.
