= Whitesand Bay =

Land mass in Cornwall, England

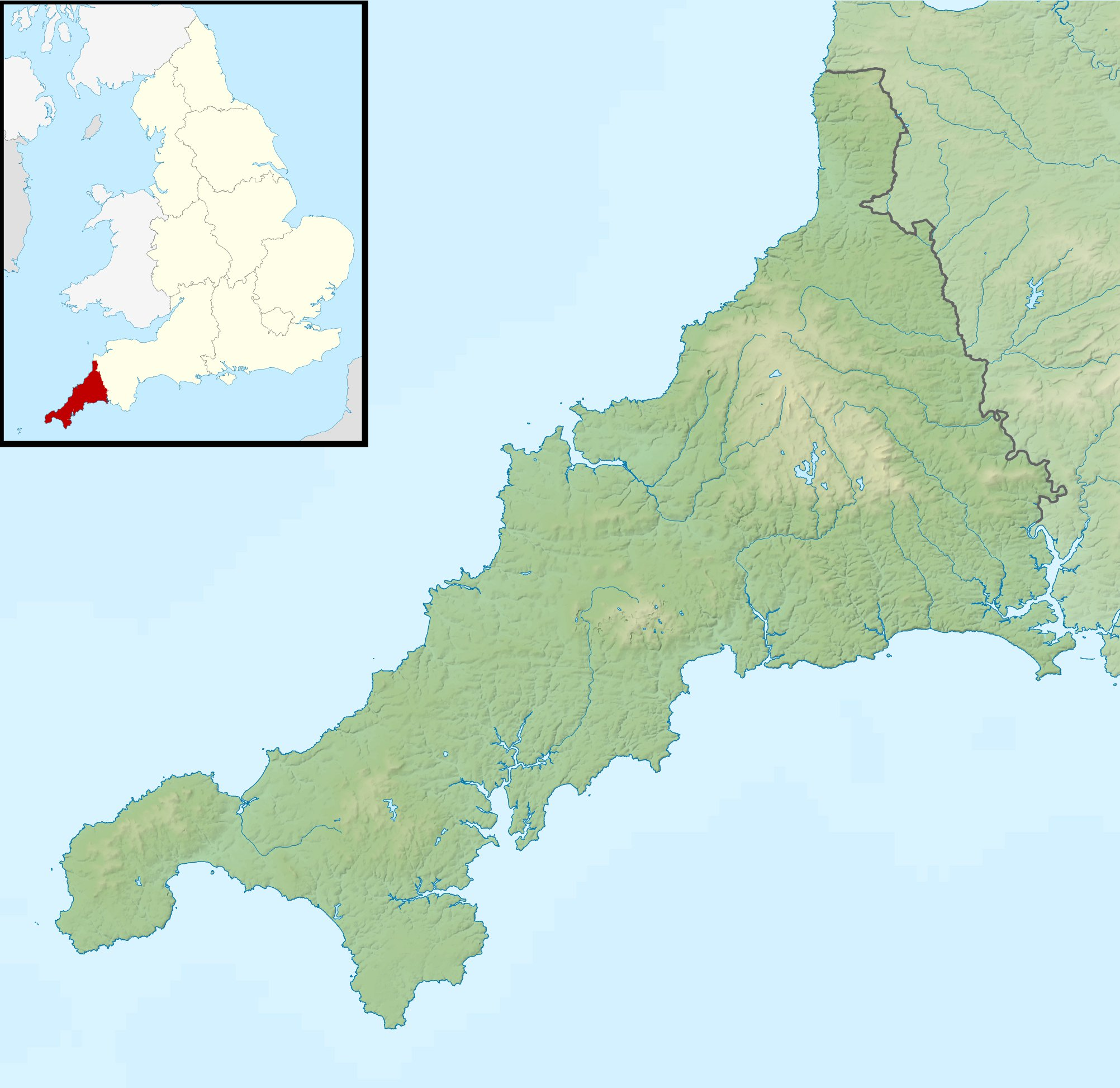
- Location within Cornwall
- Location: Cornwall
- Coordinates: 50.082°N 5.699°W
- Type: Bay
- Primary inflows: Atlantic Ocean
- Basin countries: United Kingdom
- Max. length: 2 km (1.2 mi)

Whitesand Bay (Cornish: Porth Senan, meaning cove at Sennen) is a wide sandy bay near Land's End in west Cornwall, England, United Kingdom. It stretches for one mile between the headlands of Pedn-mên-du and Aire Point. and contains the village of Sennen Cove. It is also a landing point for the Atlantic Crossing 1 international telecommunications cable.

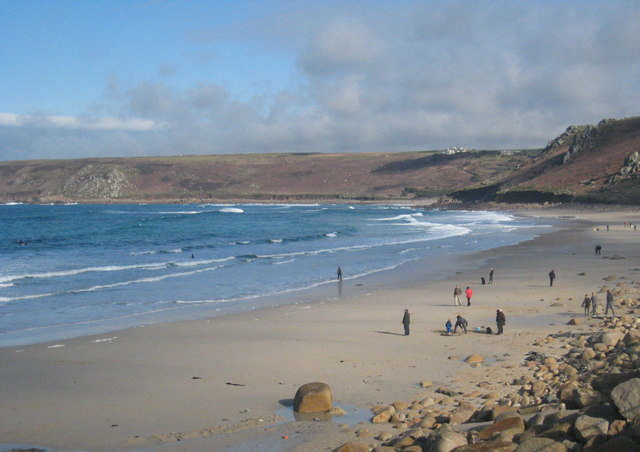
Sennen Cove Beach

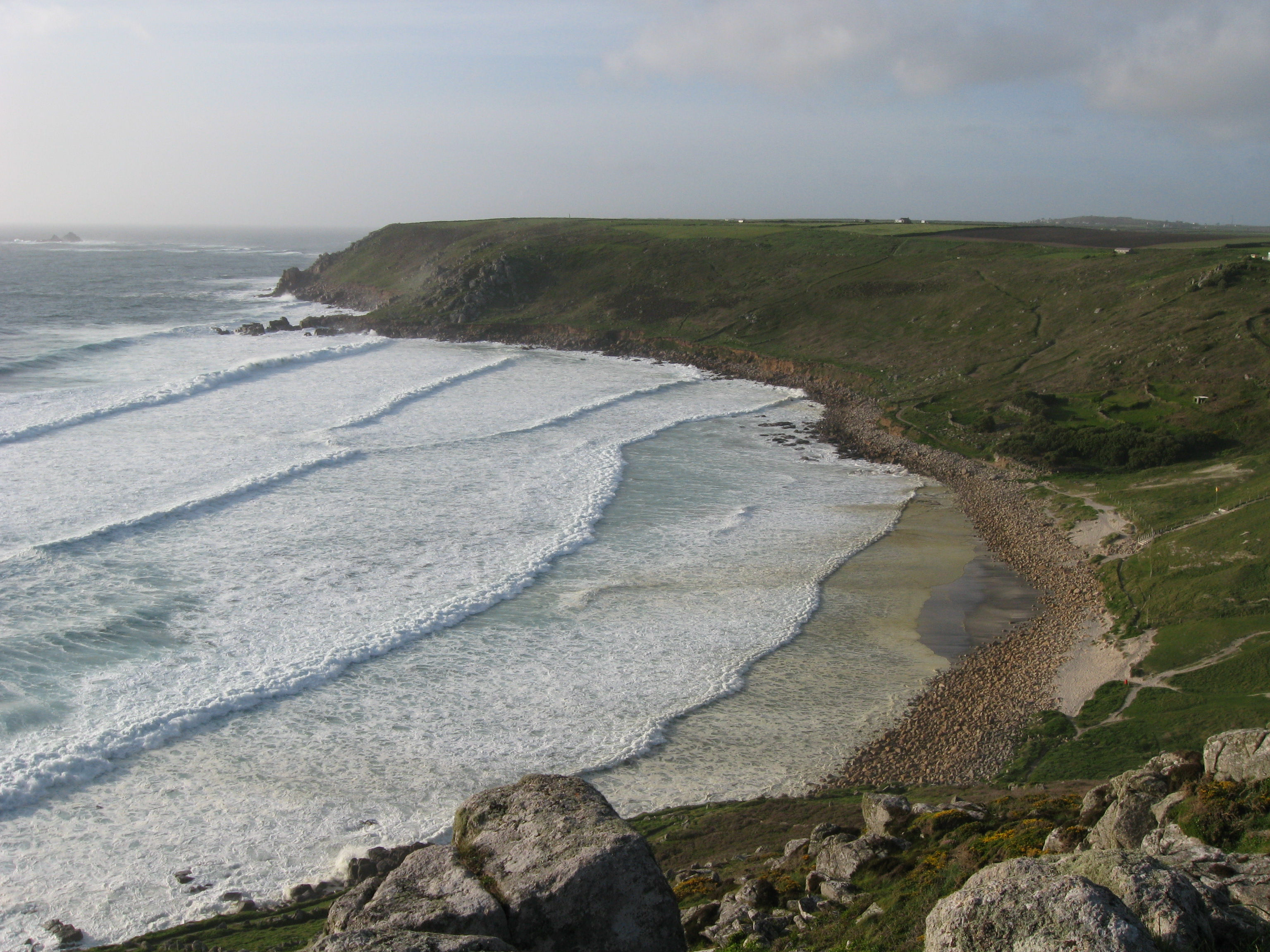
Gwynver Beach

Whitesand Bay beach is popular with surfers. At high tide, the beach is divided in two: Sennen Cove beach to the south (more popular for its size, facilities and surf schools), and Gwynver beach to the north (popular for its typically better surfing waves and walking distance of Trevedra Farm campsite). At the south end, at Sennen Cove, there are toilet facilities, a surf shop, a restaurant, and two car parks, one in a large field above the cliff, and another beside the beach. Dogs are banned on the beach from Easter Day to 1 October every year. The South West Coast Path runs along the dunes behind the beach.

== History ==
Perkin Warbeck landed here at the start of the Second Cornish Uprising of 1497. The bay lends its name to the Bay class frigate HMS Whitesand Bay..

== Natural history ==
The west facing bay is backed by a 38 hectares (94 acres) dune system which has developed from a limited supply of sand trapped within the shelter of the headlands, Pedn-mên-du (in the south) and Aire Point. The dunes contain the only British population of the shield bug Geotomus punctulatus which was first recorded here in 1864. G. punctulatus is a southern European species and associated with sparsely vegetated areas of loose sand and feeds on lady's bedstraw (Galium verum). Another rarity is Emblethis griseus a seed-eating bug associated with marram grass (Ammophila arenaria), common stork’s-bill (Erodium cicutarium), spurges (Euphorbia species) and sparse grassland. Never numerous here, it is also recorded in the Isles of Scilly and Kent.
