= HMS Widemouth Bay =

1945 Bay-class anti-aircraft frigate of the Royal Navy

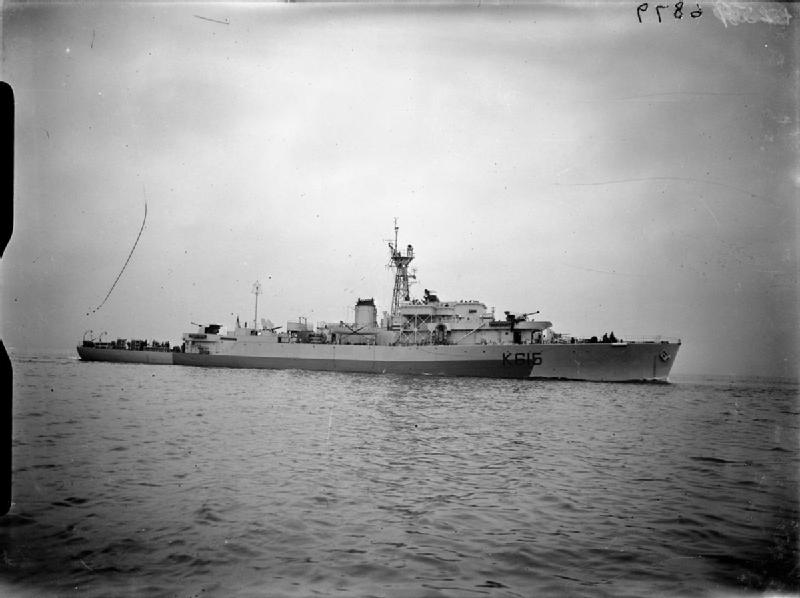

History

United Kingdom
- Name: HMS Widemouth Bay
- Namesake: Widemouth Bay
- Builder: Harland & Wolff
- Yard number: 1259
- Laid down: 24 April 1944
- Launched: 19 October 1944
- Commissioned: 13 April 1945
- Decommissioned: July 1949
- Recommissioned: June 1951
- Decommissioned: September 1953
- Identification: Pennant number K615
- Fate: Sold for scrapping, 1957.
- Badge: On a Field barry wavy of six White and Blue Talbot's head erased Black, collared Blue.

General characteristics
- Class & type: Bay-class anti-aircraft frigate
- Displacement: 1,600 long tons standard, 2,530 tons full
- Length: 286 ft (87 m) p/p; 307 ft 3 in (93.65 m) o/a
- Beam: 38 ft 6 in (11.73 m)
- Draught: 12 ft 9 in (3.89 m)
- Propulsion: 2 × Admiralty 3-drum boilers, 2 shafts, 4-cylinder vertical triple expansion reciprocating engines, 5,500 ihp (4,100 kW)
- Range: 724 tons oil fuel, 9,500 nmi (17,600 km) at 12 knots (22 km/h)
- Complement: 157
- Armament: 4 × QF 4-inch (100 mm) Mark XVI on 2 twin mounting HA/LA Mk.XIX; 4 × 40 mm Bofors A/A on 2 twin mounts Mk.V; 4 × 20 mm Oerlikon A/A on 2 twin mounts Mk.V; 1 × Hedgehog 24 barrel A/S projector; 2 rails and 4 throwers for 50 depth charges

HMS Widemouth Bay was a Bay-class anti-aircraft frigate of the Royal Navy, named for Widemouth Bay in Cornwall.

The ship was ordered from Harland and Wolff at Belfast on 2 February 1943 as a Loch-class frigate to be named Loch Frisa and laid down on 26 April 1944 as Admiralty Job Number J3917. During construction the contract was changed, and the ship was completed as a Bay-class frigate and named Widemouth Bay on 5 October 1944. Launched on 19 October, she was completed on 13 April 1945, the first of her class to be completed.

== Service history ==
After sea trials and training Widemouth Bay sailed in July 1945. She arrived at the Forward Base of the British Pacific Fleet at Manus, Admiralty Islands, in August, just after the Japanese surrender. She remained on the Far East Station, based at Hong Kong, for the next year and a half, supporting post-war repatriation operations, carrying out patrols and escort duties.

In March 1947, along with her sister ships Bigbury Bay, Veryan Bay and Whitesand Bay, she was transferred to Mediterranean Fleet, to reinforce the Palestine Patrol. In September 1948 Widemouth Bay returned to the UK, and was assigned to the Fishery Protection Patrol, operating in the waters around the UK. From January to July 1949, her commanding officer was Anthony Thorold. In July 1949, when she was decommissioned and laid up in Reserve at Sheerness.

Widemouth Bay was recommissioned in June 1951 for service in 4th Training Flotilla of the Home Fleet, based at Rosyth, also acting as an escort ship, and taking part in the Coronation Naval Review at Spithead in June 1953. The ship was decommissioned again in September 1953 and put into Reserve at Chatham.

Widemouth Bay was placed on the Disposal List in 1957, and sold to the British Iron & Steel Corporation (BISCO) for breaking up by Hughes Bolckow. She arrived in tow at the breaker's yard in Blyth on 23 November 1957.

== Publications ==
- Colledge, J. J.; Warlow, Ben (2006) [1969]. Ships of the Royal Navy: The Complete Record of All Fighting Ships of the Royal Navy from the 15th Century to the Present (3rd Rev ed.). London: Chatham Publishing. ISBN 978-1-86176-281-8. OCLC 67375475.
