= HMS Start Bay =

1945 Bay-class anti-aircraft frigate of the Royal Navy

History

United Kingdom
- Name: HMS Start Bay (K604/F604)
- Namesake: Start Bay
- Ordered: 6 March 1943
- Builder: Harland and Wolff, Belfast
- Yard number: 1252
- Laid down: 31 August 1944
- Launched: 15 February 1945
- Completed: 6 September 1945
- Decommissioned: November 1946
- Fate: Sold for scrapping, 1958
- Badge: On a Field Gold, in base barry wavy of four Blue and white, three piles conjoined in base Red.

General characteristics
- Class & type: Bay-class frigate
- Displacement: 1,600 long tons (1,626 t) standard; 2,530 long tons (2,571 t) full
- Length: 286 ft (87 m) p/p; 307 ft 3 in (93.65 m) o/a
- Beam: 38 ft 6 in (11.73 m)
- Draught: 12 ft 9 in (3.89 m)
- Propulsion: 2 × Admiralty 3-drum boilers, 2 shafts, 4-cylinder vertical triple expansion reciprocating engines, 5,500 ihp (4,100 kW)
- Speed: 19.5 knots (36.1 km/h; 22.4 mph)
- Range: 724 tons oil fuel, 9,500 nmi (17,600 km) at 12 knots (22 km/h)
- Complement: Frigates: 157 - Despatch vessels: 160 - Survey ships: 133
- Sensors & processing systems: Type 285 fire control radar; Type 291 air warning radar; Type 276 target indication radar; High Frequency Direction Finder (HF/DF); IFF transponder
- Armament: 4 × QF 4 inch Mark XVI guns on 2 twin mounting HA/LA Mk.XIX; 4 × 40 mm Bofors A/A on 2 twin mounts Mk.V; 4 × 20 mm Oerlikon A/A on 2 twin mounts Mk.V; 1 × Hedgehog 24 barrel A/S projector; 2 rails and 4 throwers for 50 depth charges

HMS Start Bay (K604/F604) was a Bay-class anti-aircraft frigate of the British Royal Navy, named for Start Bay in Devon. In commission from 1945 to 1946 in the Mediterranean Fleet, she spent most of her career in the Reserve Fleet.

== Construction ==
The ship was originally ordered from Harland and Wolff, Belfast, on 6 March 1943 as the Loch-class frigate Loch Arklet. However the contract was then changed, and the ship was laid down to a revised design as a Bay-class anti-aircraft frigate on 8 February 1944, launched on 15 February 1945, and not completed until 6 September 1945, after the end of hostilities.

== Service history ==
Start Bay was originally assigned to the British Pacific Fleet, but after the surrender of Japan in August this was changed and she was allocated for service in the 66th Escort Division in the Mediterranean Fleet. After trials, testing, and working-up at Tobermory she sailed for Malta in November 1945, to carry out patrol duties in western Mediterranean, with visits to Gibraltar and Catania. She also deployed as guardship at Trieste, and carried out patrols in eastern Mediterranean to intercept ships taking illegal Jewish immigrants to Palestine in mid-1946.

In September 1946 she joined the newly formed 5th Frigate Flotilla based in Malta, and continued her patrols in the Eastern Mediterranean. She returned to the UK in October, was decommissioned in November, and put into Reserve at Portsmouth. She was refitted at Southampton in 1948, and her pennant number was changed to F604 in May 1948.

The ship attended the Coronation Review at Spithead in 1953 as part of the Reserve Fleet. She then carried out visits to ports on the south coast of England and in Wales before returning to Portsmouth.

== Decommissioning and disposal ==
Placed on the Disposal List in 1958, she was sold to the British Iron & Steel Corporation (BISCO) for breaking-up by J. Cashmore, and arrived in tow at the breaker's yard in Newport, Wales, on 22 July 1958.

== Publications ==
- Colledge, J. J.; Warlow, Ben (2006) [1969]. Ships of the Royal Navy: The Complete Record of All Fighting Ships of the Royal Navy from the 15th Century to the Present (3rd Rev ed.). London: Chatham Publishing. ISBN 978-1-86176-281-8. OCLC 67375475.
