= HMS Largo Bay =

1946 Bay-class anti-aircraft frigate of the Royal Navy

History

United Kingdom
- Name: HMS Largo Bay
- Namesake: Largo Bay
- Builder: William Pickersgill & Sons Ltd., Southwick, Sunderland
- Laid down: 8 February 1944
- Launched: 3 October 1944
- Commissioned: 26 January 1946
- Decommissioned: August 1946
- Identification: Pennant number K423
- Fate: Scrapped, 1959
- Badge: On a Field barry wavy of eight White and Blue a branch of oak tree Green fructed Gold

General characteristics
- Class & type: Bay-class frigate
- Displacement: 1,600 long tons (1,626 t) standard; 2,530 long tons (2,571 t) full
- Length: 286 ft (87 m) p/p; 307 ft 3 in (93.65 m) o/a
- Beam: 38 ft 6 in (11.73 m)
- Draught: 12 ft 9 in (3.89 m)
- Propulsion: 2 × Admiralty 3-drum boilers, 2 shafts, 4-cylinder vertical triple expansion reciprocating engines, 5,500 ihp (4,100 kW)
- Speed: 19.5 knots (36.1 km/h; 22.4 mph)
- Range: 724 tons oil fuel, 9,500 nmi (17,600 km) at 12 knots (22 km/h)
- Complement: 157
- Sensors & processing systems: Type 285 fire control radar; Type 291 air warning radar; Type 276 target indication radar; High Frequency Direction Finder (HF/DF); IFF transponder
- Armament: 4 × QF 4 inch Mark XVI guns on 2 twin mounting HA/LA Mk.XIX; 4 × 40 mm Bofors A/A on 2 twin mounts Mk.V; 4 × 20 mm Oerlikon A/A on 2 twin mounts Mk.V; 1 × Hedgehog 24 barrel A/S projector; 2 rails and 4 throwers for 50 depth charges

HMS Largo Bay was a Bay-class anti-aircraft frigate of the British Royal Navy, named for Largo Bay in Fife.

The ship was originally ordered from William Pickersgill & Sons Ltd. of Southwick, Sunderland on 25 January 1943 as the Loch-class frigate Loch Foin, and laid down on 8 February 1944. However, the contract was then changed, and the ship was completed to a revised design as a Bay-class anti-aircraft frigate, launched on 3 October 1944, and commissioned on 26 January 1946.

== Service history ==
After sea trials, Largo Bay sailed for the Mediterranean, joining the Escort Flotilla at Malta on 23 February 1946. She was first deployed in the eastern Mediterranean for the interception of merchant ships carrying illegal Jewish immigrants to Palestine. In March she returned to Malta for Flotilla duties. In August 1946 she returned to the UK to decommission and was placed into Plymouth Reserve Fleet. In 1953 she took part in the Fleet Review to celebrate the Coronation of Queen Elizabeth II.

Largo Bay was placed on the Disposal List in 1958 and sold to the British Iron & Steel Corporation (BISCO) for demolition by Thos. W. Ward at Inverkeithing. She was towed to the breaker's yard, arriving on 11 July 1959.

== Publications ==
- Colledge, J. J.; Warlow, Ben (2006) [1969]. Ships of the Royal Navy: The Complete Record of All Fighting Ships of the Royal Navy from the 15th Century to the Present (3rd Rev ed.). London: Chatham Publishing. ISBN 978-1-86176-281-8. OCLC 67375475.
