= HMS Cawsand Bay =

1945 Bay-class anti-aircraft frigate of the Royal Navy

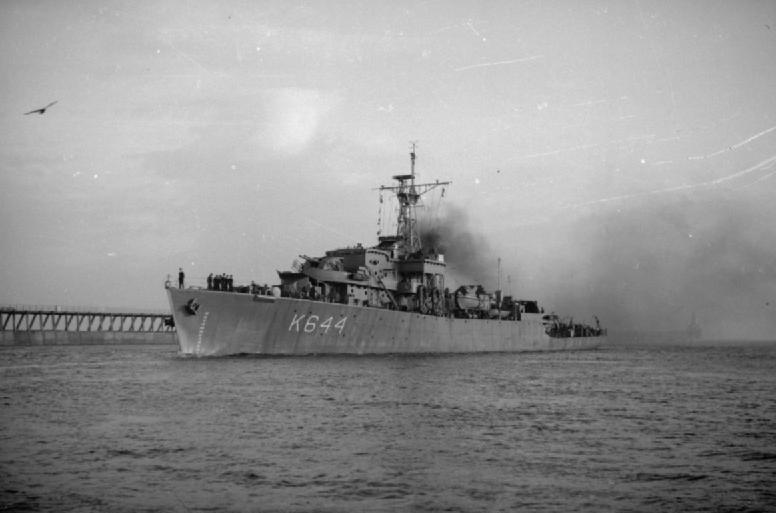
- Cawsand Bay in June 1946

History

United Kingdom
- Name: HMS Cawsand Bay
- Namesake: Cawsand Bay
- Ordered: 25 January 1943
- Builder: Blyth Shipbuilding Company, Blyth, Northumberland
- Laid down: 24 April 1944
- Launched: 26 February 1945
- Commissioned: 13 November 1945
- Decommissioned: 11 March 1946
- Identification: Pennant number K644
- Fate: Sold for scrapping, 1959
- Badge: On a Field per fess Gold and Blue an anchor counter charged within a circle composed of in chief four roses Red barbed and seeded proper and in base four bezants Gold.

General characteristics
- Class & type: Bay-class frigate
- Displacement: 1,600 long tons (1,626 t) standard; 2,530 long tons (2,571 t) full
- Length: 286 ft (87 m) p/p; 307 ft 3 in (93.65 m) o/a
- Beam: 38 ft 6 in (11.73 m)
- Draught: 12 ft 9 in (3.89 m)
- Propulsion: 2 × Admiralty 3-drum boilers, 2 shafts, 4-cylinder vertical triple expansion reciprocating engines, 5,500 ihp (4,100 kW)
- Speed: 19.5 knots (36.1 km/h; 22.4 mph)
- Range: 724 tons oil fuel, 9,500 nmi (17,600 km) at 12 knots (22 km/h)
- Complement: 157
- Sensors & processing systems: Type 285 fire control radar; Type 291 air warning radar; Type 276 target indication radar; High Frequency Direction Finder (HF/DF); IFF transponder
- Armament: 4 × QF 4 inch Mark XVI guns on 2 twin mounting HA/LA Mk.XIX; 4 × 40 mm Bofors A/A on 2 twin mounts Mk.V; 4 × 20 mm Oerlikon A/A on 2 twin mounts Mk.V; 1 × Hedgehog 24 barrel A/S projector; 2 rails and 4 throwers for 50 depth charges

HMS Cawsand Bay was a Bay-class anti-aircraft frigate of the British Royal Navy, named for Cawsand Bay in Cornwall.

The ship was originally ordered from the Blyth Shipbuilding Company of Blyth, Northumberland on 25 January 1943 as the Loch-class frigate Loch Rowan, and laid down on 24 April 1944. However the contract was then changed, and the ship was completed to a revised design as a Bay-class anti-aircraft frigate, launched on 26 February 1945, and completed on 13 November 1945.

== Service history ==
After sea trials in November and December 1945, Cawsand Bay was attached for service in the Rosyth Local Flotilla, joining in February 1946. However she was almost immediately nominated for reduction to Reserve status, sailing to Portsmouth to decommission on 11 March.

Cawsand Bay remained in Reserve at Portsmouth until 1958 when she placed on the Disposal List. The ship was sold for demolition to an Italian ship-breaker and towed to Genoa, arriving on 5 September 1959.

== Publications ==
Colledge, J. J.; Warlow, Ben (2006) [1969]. Ships of the Royal Navy: The Complete Record of All Fighting Ships of the Royal Navy from the 15th Century to the Present (3rd Rev ed.). London: Chatham Publishing. ISBN 978-1-86176-281-8. OCLC 67375475.
