= HMS Cook =

1950 Bay-class anti-aircraft frigate of the Royal Navy

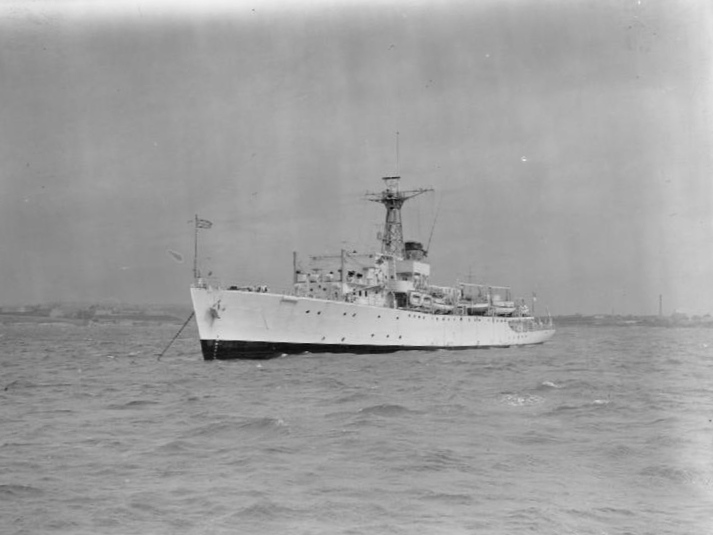
- HMS Cook in April 1951

History

United Kingdom
- Name: HMS Cook
- Namesake: James Cook
- Ordered: 25 January 1943
- Builder: William Pickersgill & Sons Ltd., South Bank, Middlesbrough
- Laid down: 30 November 1944
- Launched: 24 September 1945
- Completed: July 1950
- Commissioned: 6 June 1950
- Decommissioned: 1 May 1964
- Identification: Pennant number K638/A307
- Fate: Sold for scrapping, 1968
- Badge: On a Field Blue, impaled a hemisphere White between an estoile in chief and in base Gold.

General characteristics
- Class & type: Bay-class frigate
- Displacement: 1,600 long tons (1,626 t) standard; 2,530 long tons (2,571 t) full
- Length: 286 ft (87 m) p/p; 307 ft 3 in (93.65 m) o/a
- Beam: 38 ft 6 in (11.73 m)
- Draught: 12 ft 9 in (3.89 m)
- Propulsion: 2 × Admiralty 3-drum boilers, 2 shafts, 4-cylinder vertical triple expansion reciprocating engines, 5,500 ihp (4,100 kW)
- Speed: 19.5 knots (36.1 km/h; 22.4 mph)
- Range: 724 tons oil fuel, 9,500 nmi (17,600 km) at 12 knots (22 km/h)
- Complement: 133
- Armament: 4 × 3-pounder saluting guns; Minesweeping gear aft

HMS Cook was a Bay-class frigate of the Royal Navy, named for the explorer James Cook, which served as a survey ship, mostly in the Pacific Ocean from 1950 until 1964.

== Construction ==
The ship was originally ordered from William Pickersgill & Sons Ltd. of South Bank, Middlesbrough, on 25 January 1943 as the Loch-class frigate Loch Mochrum. However the contract was then changed, and the ship was laid down as Admiralty Job Number 4813 on 30 November 1944 to a revised design as a Bay-class frigate, and launched on 24 September 1945 as Pegwell Bay. After launching the contract was terminated and the ship was towed to HM Dockyard Devonport for conversion to a survey ship. Work began in February 1948 and was completed in July 1950. No main armaments were fitted and changes were made to provide additional accommodation and offices for hydrographic work. More boats were fitted, together with Type 972 survey radar. The ship was renamed Cook and her pennant number changed to A307.

== Service history ==
Cook was commissioned for sea trials at Devonport on 6 June 1950 and carried out local surveys before completing her complement from the survey ship Seagull in January 1951. From then until December 1954 she was mainly employed in survey work off the west coast of Scotland, though she also sailed to the Gold Coast to survey there in mid-1953. In that year she also took part in the Fleet Review to celebrate the Coronation of Queen Elizabeth II.

In 1955 Cook began to carry out trials of the Decca Two Range Survey System, which fixed the ship's position by radio signals from two shore stations. She recommenced survey operations in 1956, with further radio trials and survey work in the Hebrides.

In March 1957 she sailed to the Pacific, via the Azores, the West Indies, and Panama Canal, to observe the first British thermonuclear bomb test, code-named "Operation Grapple", on 15 May. She then sailed to Fiji for survey work, which included gravimetric and magnetic measurements. In March 1958, after refitting at Devonport Naval Base, Auckland, Cook sailed to the Solomon Islands, finding that the positions of some islands were incorrect. In August she sailed to Hong Kong to refit. In October 1958, she sailed for New Britain, also surveying shoals and reefs east of the Philippines, and carrying out depth measurements of the Philippine Trench. The survey of the Solomon Islands continued from November 1958 to February 1959, and further surveys were carried out around New Ireland. She arrived at Sydney in March to exchange Captain and surveying teams who had flown in from the UK. Cook returned to Fiji in May and in August to the Gilbert and Ellice Islands. She sailed to Singapore in November 1959. After an inspection, the ship was received an extensive refit, receiving new and upgraded equipment, as well as improvements to her working and accommodation areas.

In March 1961 she sailed to the New Hebrides, then returned to Fiji in July to continue survey work around the islands. She sailed to Auckland for repairs and annual inspection in September, then returned to Fiji in January 1962. In May she sailed for the Gilbert Islands for surveys and soundings, then sailed for Singapore to refit in July. In October Cook returned to the Gilbert & Ellice Islands. After her annual inspection and repairs at Auckland in April–May 1963, she returned to Fiji, surveying Bligh Water.

On 1 October 1963 Cook was grounded off Suva and badly holed forward. After ten hours she was refloated, and made temporary repairs at Suva. In November she sailed to Singapore, where her captain was court-martialed and found guilty of hazarding and stranding his ship. She then returned to the UK via the Indian Ocean, the Suez Canal, Malta and Gibraltar. Cook was withdrawn from service and decommissioned on 1 May 1964, and then put into Reserve.

== Publications ==
- Colledge, J. J.; Warlow, Ben (2006) [1969]. Ships of the Royal Navy: The Complete Record of All Fighting Ships of the Royal Navy from the 15th Century to the Present (3rd Rev ed.). London: Chatham Publishing. ISBN 978-1-86176-281-8. OCLC 67375475.
