= HMS Mounts Bay =

Bay-class anti-aircraft frigate of the Royal Navy and Portuguese Navy

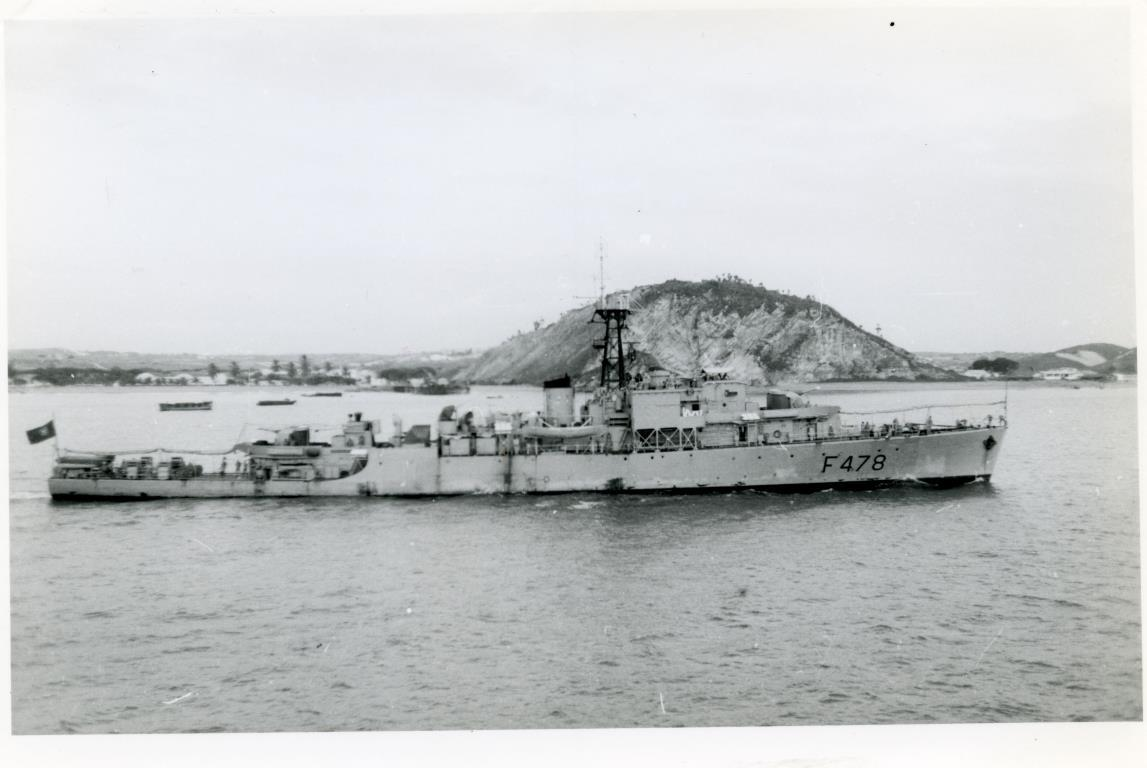
- As NRP Vasco da Gama

History

United Kingdom
- Name: Mounts Bay
- Namesake: Mount's Bay
- Builder: William Pickersgill & Sons Ltd., South Bank, Middlesbrough
- Laid down: 23 October 1944
- Launched: 8 June 1945
- Commissioned: 11 April 1949
- Decommissioned: May 1960
- Identification: pennant number K627
- Honours and awards: Korea 1950–53
- Fate: Sold to Portugal, 1961

Portugal
- Name: Vasco da Gama
- Namesake: Vasco da Gama
- Acquired: 1961
- Identification: F478
- Fate: Scrapped 1971

General characteristics
- Class & type: Bay-class frigate
- Displacement: 1,600 long tons (1,626 t) standard; 2,530 long tons (2,571 t) full
- Length: 286 ft (87 m) p/p; 307 ft 3 in (93.65 m) o/a
- Beam: 38 ft 6 in (11.73 m)
- Draught: 12 ft 9 in (3.89 m)
- Propulsion: 2 × Admiralty 3-drum boilers, 2 shafts, 4-cylinder vertical triple expansion reciprocating engines, 5,500 ihp (4,100 kW)
- Speed: 19.5 knots (36.1 km/h; 22.4 mph)
- Range: 724 tons oil fuel, 9,500 nmi (17,600 km) at 12 knots (22 km/h)
- Complement: 157
- Sensors & processing systems: Type 285 fire control radar; Type 291 air warning radar; Type 276 target indication radar; High Frequency Direction Finder (HF/DF); IFF transponder
- Armament: 4 × QF 4-inch Mark XVI guns on 2 twin mounting HA/LA Mk.XIX; 4 × 40 mm Bofors A/A on 2 twin mounts Mk.V; 4 × 20 mm Oerlikon A/A on 2 twin mounts Mk.V; 1 × Hedgehog 24 barrel A/S projector; 2 rails and 4 throwers for 50 depth charges

HMS Mounts Bay was a Bay-class anti-aircraft frigate of the British Royal Navy, named after Mount's Bay in Cornwall. In commission from 1949 until 1960, she saw active service in the Korean War, and was sold to Portugal in 1961 to serve as NRP Vasco da Gama until 1971.

== Design and construction ==
The Bay-class was a version of the Loch-class anti-submarine (A/S) frigate adapted to meet a requirement for anti-aircraft escorts for use against Japan, with conversions during construction of 26 ships planned.

Mounts Bay was ordered as Loch Kilburnie on 25 January 1943, and was laid down on 23 October 1944 at William Pickersgill & Sons's Southwick, Sunderland shipyard as yard number 267. The ship was launched on 8 June 1945. Construction was suspended in 1946, and the ship moved to Thornycroft's shipyard at Woolston, Southampton on 20 March 1946 for completion. Mounts Bay was completed on 11 August 1949.

The ship was 307 ft (93.57 m) long overall with a beam of 38 ft 7 in (11.76 m) and a draught of 12 ft 9 in (3.89 m). Displacement was 1,600 long tons (1,600 t) standard and 2,420 long tons (2,460 t) deep load. The ship was powered by two 4-cylinder triple expansion steam engines fed with steam from two Admiralty 3-drum boilers and rated at 5,500 indicated horsepower (4,100 kW). This gave a speed of 19.5 knots (36.1 km/h; 22.4 mph). The ship had a range of 4,800 nmi (5,500 mi; 8,900 km) in the tropics.

Mounts Bay had a main gun armament of four QF 4-inch naval gun Mk XVI guns in two twin mounts, with each mount fitted with remote power control. This was backed up by two twin and two single Bofors 40 mm L/60 guns. Anti-submarine armament consisted of a Hedgehog anti submarine mortar, together with four depth charge throwers and two rails, with 50 depth charges carried. The ship had a complement of 157 officers and other ranks.

== Royal Navy service ==
As the ship was incomplete at the end of the war, consideration was given to scrapping her, or selling her to Belgium, while other incomplete Bay-class ships were became survey ships or despatch vessels, but in the end, Mounts Bay was completed as a frigate. She was initially allocated the pennant number K627, but when all Royal Navy escort vessels (including corvettes and sloops) were redesignated as frigates in 1947, the prefix of the pennant number of all frigates was changed to F, giving a pennant number of F627 when Mounts Bay entered service. She was the first ship with the name Mounts Bay to serve with the Royal Navy.

On commissioning, Mounts Bay was allocated to the Far East, replacing Amethyst. On 2 May 1950, after the British merchant ship Incharran, on passage from Hong Kong to Macao with a cargo of rice, was seized by a Nationalist Chinese warship, Mounts Bay was sent to respond, and Incharran was released.

On 25 June 1950, North Korean forces invaded South Korea, launching the Korean War. In response, British naval forces in Japanese waters were placed at the disposal of the US-led response to the invasion. Mounts Bay arrived on station off Korea on 9 August 1950, relieving Black Swan as flagship of the Royal Navy escort element, TE.96.50, escorting convoys between Sasebo, Japan to Pusan in the south of Korea. Mounts Bay formed part of the naval force screening the beachhead during the amphibious landings at Incheon from 15 September to 14 October 1950. Mounts Bay shelled North Koreans building shore emplacements on 23 September, firing 118 four-inch shells, and briefly grounded during the engagement, although the frigate was undamaged. After operations at Incheon finished, Mounts Bay was deployed to Wonsan on the east coast of Korea, where more amphibious landings were planned, escorting the associated convoys while minefields in the approaches to Wonsan were swept, which delayed the landings from the planned 20 October till 25 October, when the British led escort group (Note: Mounts Bay, Morecambe Bay, HMNZS Pukaki, HMNZS Tutira and the French aviso La Grandière.) was released.

Mounts Bay continued to make deployments to the waters off Korea for the remainder of the Korean War, with the ship also operating off Malaya during the Malayan Emergency.

== Decommissioning and disposal ==
In May 1960 the ship was decommissioned and put into Reserve at Portsmouth. She was modernized by John I Thornycroft in Southampton, before being commissioned by the Portuguese Navy on 3 August 1961.

== Bibliography ==
- B.R. 1736 (54): British Commonwealth Naval Operations, Korea, 1950–53 (PDF). Naval Staff History. Ministry of Defence: Historical Branch (Naval). 1967.
- Colledge, J. J.; Warlow, Ben (2006) [1969]. Ships of the Royal Navy: The Complete Record of All Fighting Ships of the Royal Navy from the 15th Century to the Present (3rd Rev ed.). London: Chatham Publishing. ISBN 978-1-86176-281-8. OCLC 67375475.
- Critchley, Mike (1992). British Warships Since 1945. Vol. Part 5: Frigates. Liskeard, UK: Maritime Press. ISBN 0-907771-13-0.
- Elliott, Peter (1977). Allied Escort Ships of World War II: A complete survey. London: Macdonald and Jane's Publishers. ISBN 0-356-08401-9.
- Farrar-Hockley, Anthony (1990). The British Part in the Korean War: Volume I: A Distant Obligation. Official History. London: HMSO. ISBN 0-11-630953-9.
- Friedman, Norman (2008). British Destroyers and Frigates: The Second World War and After. Barnsley, UK: Seaforth Publishing. ISBN 978-1-84832-015-4.
- Gardiner, Robert; Chesneau, Roger, eds. (1980). Conway's All the World's Fighting Ships 1922–1946. Greenwich, UK: Conway Maritime Press. ISBN 0-85177-146-7.
- Hastings, Max (1987). The Korean War. London: Michael Joseph. ISBN 0-7181-2068-X.
- Marriott, Leo (1983). Royal Navy Frigates 1945–1983. Ian Allan Ltd. ISBN 07110-1322-5.
