= Live at Largo =

Live at Largo is the name of several live albums recorded at the Los Angeles nightclub Largo, including:

- Live at Largo, a 2003 album by Glen Phillips (singer)
- Live at Largo, a 2000 album by Steve Poltz
- Elliott Smith: Live at Largo, a CD accompanying the book Elliott Smith (book) by Autumn de Wilde
- The Interpreter: Live at Largo, a 2011 album by Rhett Miller

== See also ==
- Largo (Brad Mehldau album), 2002
- Largo (disambiguation)
