= Matti Kurki =

Legendary Finnish chieftain

- Died: 13th century
- Other names: Matias Kurki, Matts Kurck
- Known for: Legendary chieftain of the birkarls

Matti Kurki (also Matias; Swedish: Matts Kurck) was a legendary Finnish chieftain of the birkarls. If he was a real person, he is thought to have lived in the late 13th century, at that time when king Magnus Ladulås ruled the Kingdom of Sweden.

Folklore tales tell about Matti Kurki, particularly in the Satakunta province (Vesilahti, Pirkkala), but also in Lapland. The first written reference to Matti Kurki dates from the 17th century.

The best known tale concerns his duel with Pohto, a Russian-Karelian warrior. The battle would have taken place near Laukko Manor.

Matti Kurki was supposedly the ancestor of the Finnish noble family of Kurki. The lands of the Laukko Manor were, according to legends, either compensation for subjugating some of the Sami to the Swedish crown by extracting taxes from them, or for his valor and deeds in the wars against the Danish enemies of the King of Sweden, or defending the eastern frontier from Novgorodian raiding parties. There is also a possibility that the manor was already in the family for many generations and that this gift was merely a tax exemption for the manor in perpetuity.

== Legacy ==
The name has been used as a traditional name in the Finnish Navy, two ships have so far carried the name in the 20th century:

- The gunboat Matti Kurki (1918–1940);
- The Bay-class frigate Matti Kurki (1962–1975)
