= Acting Conservator of the River Mersey =

Government official in England

The Acting Conservator of the River Mersey is a unique position. The holder is responsible for ensuring navigation on, and protecting the environment of, the River Mersey in the North West of England. The Conservator originally acted on behalf of a Commission appointed by The Crown, but now acts for the Department for Transport.

== History ==
In order to maintain navigation on the Mersey the (then) town of Liverpool was granted a Charter by Charles I in 1626. This conferred the right to levy tolls for shipping and to carry out improvements to the navigation of the river. By the 1800s the Mersey was carrying shipping to a much larger area of North West England (for example, it was possible to navigate to Manchester by 1730) and the Corporation of Liverpool believed it needed additional powers to fulfil its role. However, other groups did not see it in their interest to allow any one town to dominate development and the creation of a post for an independent expert, the "Conservator" was proposed. This position was created by 1842, and the Acting Conservator was responsible to a newly created "Commission for Mersey Conservancy", whose members were appointed by the Crown.

The commission, originally comprising the First Commissioner of the Admiralty, the Chancellor of the Duchy of Lancaster and the Chief Commissioner of Her Majesty's Office of Woods and Forests, set out the responsibilities of the Acting Conservator:

"... to survey and inspect the Mersey within the limits of the Commissioners' jurisdiction and to report to the Commissioners upon the state of navigation thereof, specifying all the impediments, encroachments, nuisances and annoyances in, upon, or affecting the same, and when and by whom and from what cause such impediments, encroachments, nuisances and annoyances have been created, or have arisen."

The convention that the Hydrographer of the Navy would become Acting Conservator on retirement rapidly developed. This meant that the Conservator typically held senior Naval rank and are often known to history for their previous employment. The most famous former Conservator may be Robert Fitzroy, who captained HMS Beagle when she carried Charles Darwin to the Pacific and developed some of the first weather forecasts.

== Modern duty ==
In common with their predecessors, today's Conservator's must still make an annual visit. Responsibilities now extend to environmental issues as well as navigation and the (part-time) Conservator works one or two days a week from an office in Central London. There is also an assistant based at the Mersey Docks and Harbour Company offices in Liverpool. The role of the commission has been transferred to the Secretary of State for Transport.

== List of Acting Conservators ==
(this list is incomplete)

- Robert Fitzroy. 1842 -
- George Strong Nares. 1896 to 1910
- Rear-Admiral Sir David Haslam. 1985–87
- Mary Kendrick MBE 1988–1998

== See also ==
- Mersey Docks and Harbour Company
