= HMS Padstow Bay =

1946 Bay-class anti-aircraft frigate of the Royal Navy

History

United Kingdom
- Name: HMS Padstow Bay
- Namesake: Padstow Bay
- Builder: Henry Robb, Leith
- Yard number: 350
- Laid down: 25 September 1944
- Launched: 25 September 1945
- Completed: 11 March 1946
- Commissioned: June 1946
- Decommissioned: November 1947
- Identification: Pennant number K608
- Fate: Sold for scrapping, 1959
- Badge: On a Field per fess wavy Gold and barry wavy of four Blue and White upon a crook in fess, head to the dexter Gold. a wolf couchant Proper

General characteristics
- Class & type: Bay-class frigate
- Displacement: 1,600 long tons (1,626 t) standard; 2,530 long tons (2,571 t) full
- Length: 286 ft (87 m) p/p; 307 ft 3 in (93.65 m) o/a
- Beam: 38 ft 6 in (11.73 m)
- Draught: 12 ft 9 in (3.89 m)
- Propulsion: 2 × Admiralty 3-drum boilers, 2 shafts, 4-cylinder vertical triple expansion reciprocating engines, 5,500 ihp (4,100 kW)
- Speed: 19.5 knots (36.1 km/h; 22.4 mph)
- Range: 724 tons oil fuel, 9,500 nmi (17,600 km) at 12 knots (22 km/h)
- Complement: 157
- Sensors & processing systems: Type 285 fire control radar; Type 291 air warning radar; Type 276 target indication radar; High Frequency Direction Finder (HF/DF); IFF transponder
- Armament: 4 × QF 4 inch Mark XVI guns on 2 twin mounting HA/LA Mk.XIX; 4 × 40 mm Bofors A/A on 2 twin mounts Mk.V; 4 × 20 mm Oerlikon A/A on 2 twin mounts Mk.V; 1 × Hedgehog 24 barrel A/S projector; 2 rails and 4 throwers for 50 depth charges

HMS Padstow Bay was a Bay-class anti-aircraft frigate of the British Royal Navy, named for Padstow Bay on the northern coast of Cornwall. Commissioned in 1946, she served on the American and West Indies Station only until 1947 before being put into reserve, and then sold for scrapping in 1959.

== Construction ==
The ship was originally ordered on 19 January 1944 as the Loch-class frigate Loch Coulside. However, the contract was then changed, and the ship was laid down by Henry Robb of Leith on 25 September 1944 to a revised design as a Bay-class. Admiralty Job No. J11867 was launched as Padstow Bay on 28 August 1945, and completed on 11 March 1946.

== Service history ==
After sea trials, Padstow Bay sailed to Plymouth still lacking her full complement. The ship was finally commissioned in June to serve on the American and West Indies Station. In July she sailed for Bermuda, calling at Ponta Delgada, Azores for fuel, and arriving at Bermuda on 8 August.

In September and October she carried out an extensive series of visits, stopping at Havana, Cuba, Veracruz, Mexico, Honduras, Kingston, Jamaica, Bluefields, Nicaragua, Cartagena, Colombia, Curaçao, La Guaira, Venezuela, Trinidad, Georgetown, British Guiana, Paramaribo, Surinam, and Cayenne, French Guiana, returning to Bermuda by 15 November.

After local duties, she sailed on 31 December 1945 with ships of the Squadron for more exercises and another visits programme. In January 1946 she called at Antigua and Tobago, in February, Grenada, then Saint Thomas, U.S. Virgin Islands, Guadeloupe, Marie-Galante and Sint Eustatius in March.

After a routine docking at the Royal Naval Dockyard, Bermuda, in June she embarked on a visit to North America with the cruiser Sheffield. On 1 July she arrived at Halifax, Nova Scotia, to take part in joint exercises with ships of the Royal Canadian Navy. In August she sailed from Halifax to ports in the Eastern Canadian Provinces, calling at Bathurst, New Brunswick, Ellis Bay, Anticosti, Miquelon, and Argentia and St. John's, Newfoundland. In September she visited Montreal with Sheffield, before returning to Bermuda via Portsmouth, New Hampshire.

In October she sailed for the UK, arriving back at Plymouth on 18 November, was decommissioned, and laid-up with the Reserve Fleet in December. Padstow Bay remained in the Reserve Fleet until 1958 when the ship was placed on the Disposal List. In 1959 she was sold to BISCO for demolition by an Italian shipbreaker and towed to La Spezia, arriving on 11 August.

== Publications ==
- Colledge, J. J.; Warlow, Ben (2006) [1969]. Ships of the Royal Navy: The Complete Record of All Fighting Ships of the Royal Navy from the 15th Century to the Present (3rd Rev ed.). London: Chatham Publishing. ISBN 978-1-86176-281-8. OCLC 67375475.
