= Bay-class frigate =

Class of frigates built for the Royal Navy

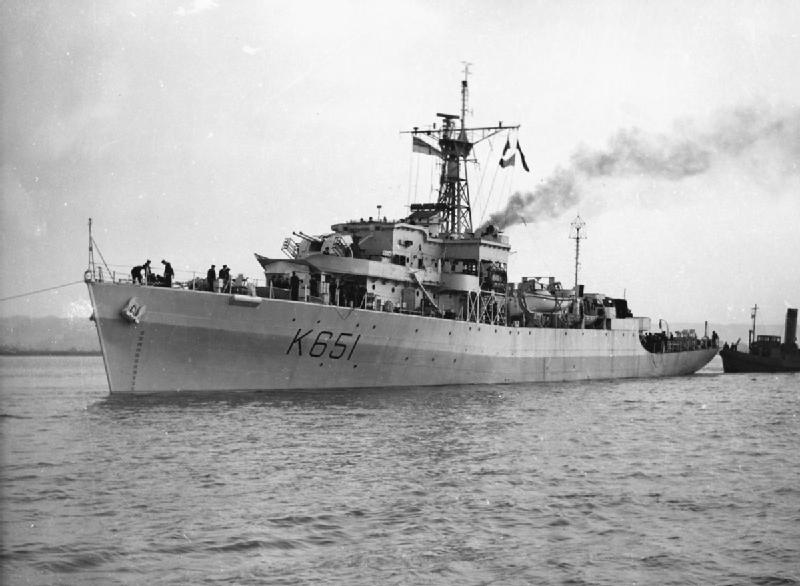
- HMS Veryan Bay in 1945

Class overview
- Name: Bay class
- Builders: Charles Hill & Sons; Henry Robb; Blyth Dry Dock; Smiths Dock; William Pickersgill; Harland & Wolff
- Operators: Royal Navy; Portuguese Navy; Finnish Navy
- Preceded by: Loch class
- In commission: 1945–1971
- Completed: 26

General characteristics
- Type: Frigate
- Displacement: 1,600 long tons (1,626 t) standard; 2,530 long tons (2,571 t) full
- Length: 286 ft (87 m) p/p; 307 ft 3 in (93.65 m) o/a
- Beam: 38 ft 6 in (11.73 m)
- Draught: 12 ft 9 in (3.89 m)
- Propulsion: 2 Admiralty 3-drum boilers, 2 shafts, 4-cylinder vertical triple expansion reciprocating engines, 5,500 ihp (4,100 kW)
- Speed: 19.5 knots (36.1 km/h; 22.4 mph)
- Range: 724 tons oil fuel, 9,500 nmi (17,600 km; 10,900 mi) at 12 knots (22 km/h; 14 mph)
- Complement: Frigates: 157; Despatch vessels: 160; Survey ships: 133
- Sensors & processing systems: Type 285 fire control radar; Type 291 air warning radar; Type 276 target indication radar; High Frequency Direction Finder (HF/DF); IFF transponder
- Armament: 4 × QF 4-inch Mark XVI guns on 2 twin mounting HA/LA Mk.XIX; 4 × 40 mm Bofors A/A on 2 twin mounts Mk.V; 4 × 20 mm Oerlikon A/A on 2 twin mounts Mk.V; 1 × Hedgehog 24 barrel A/S projector; 2 rails and 4 throwers for 50 depth charges

The Bay class was a class of 26 anti-aircraft (A/A) frigates built for the Royal Navy under the 1943 War Emergency Programme during World War II (one of which was cancelled and six completed as despatch vessels or survey ships). They were based on the hulls of incomplete Loch class anti-submarine (A/S) frigates.

In 1959 and 1961, four frigates of the class (Bigbury Bay, Burghead Bay, Morecambe Bay and Mounts Bay) were transferred to the Portuguese Navy. Between 1966 and 1968, based in Mozambique, these ships were part of the Portuguese naval deterrent force against the Royal Navy Beira Patrol which was trying to enforce sanctions against Rhodesia. In 1966 the Portuguese Navy also bought the survey vessel Dalrymple which served until 1983.

== Design ==
The Bay class made use of the hull, machinery, lattice mast and superstructure of incomplete Loch-class frigates. The armament was altered to suit them for A/A operations, with twin QF 4-inch Mark XVI guns fore and aft in mounts HA/LA Mark XIX fitted with remote power control (RPC), controlled by a rangefinder-director Mark V carried on the bridge and fitted with Type 285 radar for range taking. Due to a shortage of 4-inch (10 cm) guns and mountings, many ships had these removed from laid up V and W-class destroyer "WAIR" conversions and Hunt-class destroyers that were write-offs. A pair of Mark V "utility" mounts for twin 40 mm Bofors guns were sited amidships, each with its own predictive Simple Tachymetric Director (STD) for fire control. The A/A armament was completed by a pair of mounts Mark V for twin 20 mm Oerlikon guns, carried in the bridge wings. Later, the Oerlikons were replaced with single mounts Mark VII for Bofors guns, a further pair of which were added amidships on raised platforms. For A/S use, a Hedgehog projector was carried on the fo'c'sle and the quarterdeck carried two racks and four throwers for up to 50 depth charges.

Along with the Radar Type 285 fire control set, Radar Type 291 air warning was carried at the head of the topmast in addition to Radar Type 276 (later 293) target indication at the masthead. The associated IFF transponders were also carried on the foremast to distinguish between friendly and enemy targets and a high frequency direction finder (HF/DF) was carried on a short pole mainmast aft.

Six Bays were completed to different designs. Dundrum Bay and Gerrans Bay were renamed Alert and Surprise and completed as "despatch vessels", commander-in-chief's (C-in-C) yachts for the Mediterranean and Far East Fleets. These ships omitted the Mark V Bofors mounts and the aft 4-inch (10 cm) guns and had the superstructure extended to provide additional flag accommodation and stepped a tall mainmast. The four other ships were completed as survey vessels, specifically to deal with the vast numbers of uncharted wrecks and mines around the British Isles from wartime. They were unarmed, except for four 3-pounder saluting guns. They had shorter forward shelter decks and carried survey boats under davits abreast the funnel and minesweeping gear aft.

== Ships ==
=== Frigates ===
- Bigbury Bay (K606) (ex- Loch Carloway) - built by Hall Russell, laid down 30 May 1944, launched 16 November 1944 and completed 10 July 1945. Sold to Portugal in 1959, becoming the NRP Pacheco Pereira (F337), serving until 1970.
- Burghead Bay (K622) (ex- Loch Harport) - built by Charles Hill & Sons, laid down 21 September 1944, launched 3 March 1945 and completed 20 September 1945. Sold to Portugal in 1959, becoming the NRP Álvares Cabral (F336), serving until 1971.
- Cardigan Bay (K630) (ex- Loch Laxford) - built by Henry Robb, laid down 14 April 1944, launched 28 December 1944 and completed 25 June 1945.
- Carnarvon Bay (K636) (ex- Loch Maddy) - built by Henry Robb, laid down 8 June 1944, launched 15 March 1945 and completed 20 September 1945.
- Cawsand Bay (K644) (ex- Loch Roan) - built by Blyth Dry Dock, laid down 24 April 1944, launched 26 February 1945 and completed 13 November 1945.
- Enard Bay (K435) (ex- Loch Brachdale) - built by Smiths Dock, laid down 27 May 1944, launched 31 October 1944 and completed 4 January 1946.
- Hollesley Bay (K614) (ex- Loch Fannich) - ordered from Smiths Dock, but cancelled, 1945.
- Largo Bay (K423) (ex- Loch Foin) - built by William Pickersgill, laid down 8 February 1944, launched 3 October 1944 and completed 26 January 1946.
- Morecambe Bay (K624) (ex- Loch Heilen) - built by William Pickersgill, laid down 30 April 1944, launched 11 November 1944 and completed 11 March 1946. Sold to Portugal in 1961, becoming the NRP Dom Francisco de Almeida (F479), serving until 1970.
- Mounts Bay (K627) (ex- Loch Kilbernie) - built by William Pickersgill, laid down 23 October 1944, launched 8 June 1945 and completed 11 April 1949. Sold to Portugal in 1961, becoming the NRP Vasco da Gama (F478), serving until 1971.
- Padstow Bay (K608) (ex- Loch Coulside) - built by Henry Robb, laid down 25 September 1944, launched 25 September 1945 and completed 11 March 1946.
- Porlock Bay (K650) (ex- Loch Seaforth, ex- Loch Muick) - built by Charles Hill & Sons, laid down 22 November 1944, launched 14 June 1945 and completed 8 March 1946. Sold to Finland in 1962, becoming the FNS Matti Kurki, serving until 1975.
- Veryan Bay (K651) (ex- Loch Swannay) - built by Charles Hill & Sons, laid down 8 June 1944, launched 11 November 1944 and completed 13 May 1945.
- St Austell Bay (K634) (ex- Loch Lyddoch) - built by Harland & Wolff, laid down 30 May 1944, launched 18 November 1944 and completed 29 May 1945.
- St Brides Bay (K600) (ex- Loch Achility) - built by Harland & Wolff, laid down 30 May 1944, launched 16 January 1945 and completed 6 September 1945.
- Start Bay (K604) (ex- Loch Arklet) - built by Harland & Wolff, laid down 31 August 1944, launched 15 February 1945 and completed 10 July 1945.
- Tremadoc Bay (K605) (ex- Loch Arnish) - built by Harland & Wolff, laid down 31 August 1944, launched 29 March 1945 and completed 11 October 1945.
- Whitesand Bay (K633) (ex- Loch Lubnaig) - built by Harland & Wolff, laid down 8 August 1944, launched 16 December 1944 and completed 30 July 1945.
- Widemouth Bay (K615) (ex- Loch Frisa) - built by Harland & Wolff, laid down 24 April 1944, launched 19 October 1944 and completed 13 April 1945.
- Wigtown Bay (K616) (ex- Loch Garasdale) - built by Harland & Wolff, laid down 24 October 1944, launched 26 April 1945 and completed 19 January 1946.

=== Despatch vessels ===
- Alert (K647) (ex- Dundrum Bay, ex- Loch Scamdale) - built by Blyth Dry Dock, laid down 28 July 1944, launched 10 July 1945 and completed 24 October 1946.
- Surprise (K346) (ex- Gerrans Bay, ex- Loch Carron) - built by Smiths Dock, laid down 21 April 1944, launched 14 March 1945 and completed 9 September 1946.

=== Survey vessels ===
- Cook (K638) (ex- Pegwell Bay, ex- Loch Mochrum) - built by William Pickersgill, laid down 30 November 1944, launched 24 September 1945 and completed 20 July 1950.
- Dalrymple (K427) (ex- Luce Bay, ex- Loch Glass) - built by William Pickersgill, laid down 29 April 1944, launched 12 April 1945 and completed 10 February 1949. Sold to Portugal in 1966, becoming the NRP Afonso de Albuquerque (A526), serving until 1983.
- Dampier (K611) (ex- Herne Bay, ex- Loch Eil) - built by Smiths Dock, laid down 7 August 1944, launched 15 May 1945 and completed 14 June 1948.
- Owen (K640) (ex- Thurso Bay, ex- Loch Muick) - built by Hall Russell, laid down 30 September 1944, launched 19 October 1945 and completed 23 September 1949.
