= Northwestern Shiprepairers & Shipbuilders =

- Company type: Private
- Industry: Shipbuilding
- Founded: 2001
- Defunct: 2008
- Fate: Name change
- Successor: Cammell Laird
- Headquarters: Birkenhead, UK
- Key people: John Syvret, (Chairman)

Northwestern Shiprepairers & Shipbuilders was a British shiprepair company based in Birkenhead on the River Mersey.

== History ==
The company was founded by John Syvret, a former Cammell Laird manager, in 2001. In 2002 50% of the business was sold to Mersey Docks & Harbour Co. in exchange for the use of their dry docks. Then in 2005 the company acquired the former Cammell Laird yard at Birkenhead from A&P Group. In June 2008 the Company won an order to maintain 11 Royal Fleet Auxiliary ships.

Having acquired the rights to the use of the Cammell Laird name, in November 2008 the Company changed its name to Cammell Laird Shiprepairers and Shipbuilders Ltd.
