= Archibald Day =

Royal Navy Vice Admiral and Hydrographer of the Navy (1899–1970)

Vice-Admiral Sir Archibald Day KBE CB DSO
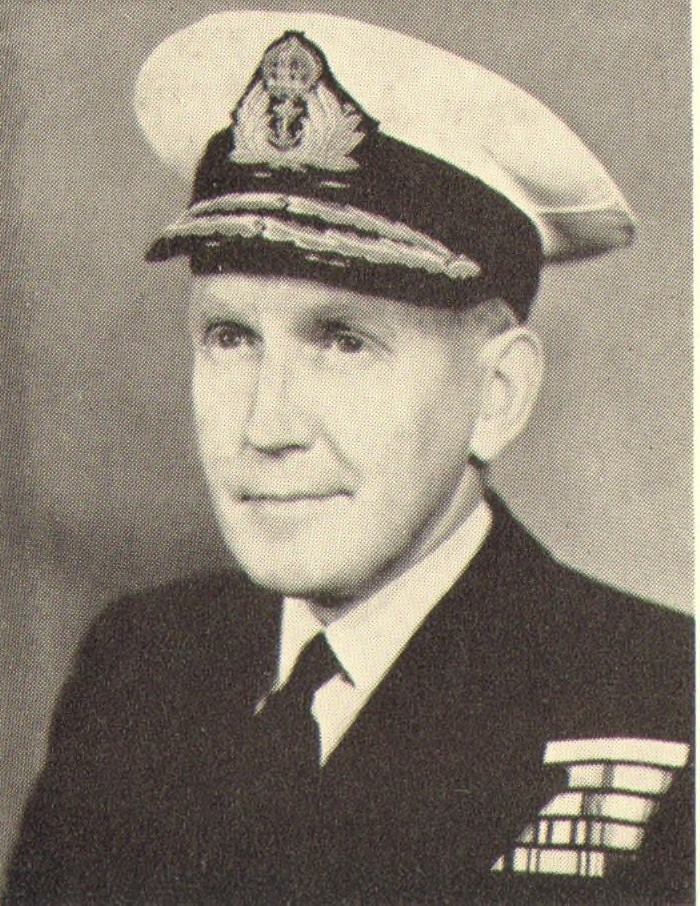
- Born: 18 July 1899
- Died: 17 July 1970 (aged 70); Dover
- Military career
- Allegiance: United Kingdom
- Branch: Royal Navy
- Service years: 1914–1955
- Rank: Vice-admiral
- Office: Hydrographer of the Navy
- Term: 1950-1955

Vice-Admiral Sir Archibald Day, KBE, CB, DSO (18 July 1899 – 17 July 1970) was an officer in the Royal Navy and Hydrographer of the Navy from 1950-1955. He played an important part in planning the evacuation from Dunkirk in 1940, and wrote a history of the Hydrographic Service.

== Life ==
Day spent two years with HMS Conway, the naval school ship, and then was at Dartmouth Naval College, but was mobilised for World War I after only one term at the age of 15. He served as cadet and midshipman in the North Sea and with HMS Welland in the Mediterranean. He was promoted to Lieutenant on 15 August 1919, and in 1920 began survey work, serving on HMS Endeavour on the north coast of Egypt. He spent the next 12 years surveying in various ships on the east coast of England, China, Malaya, and the Middle East, with two spells ashore as naval assistant.

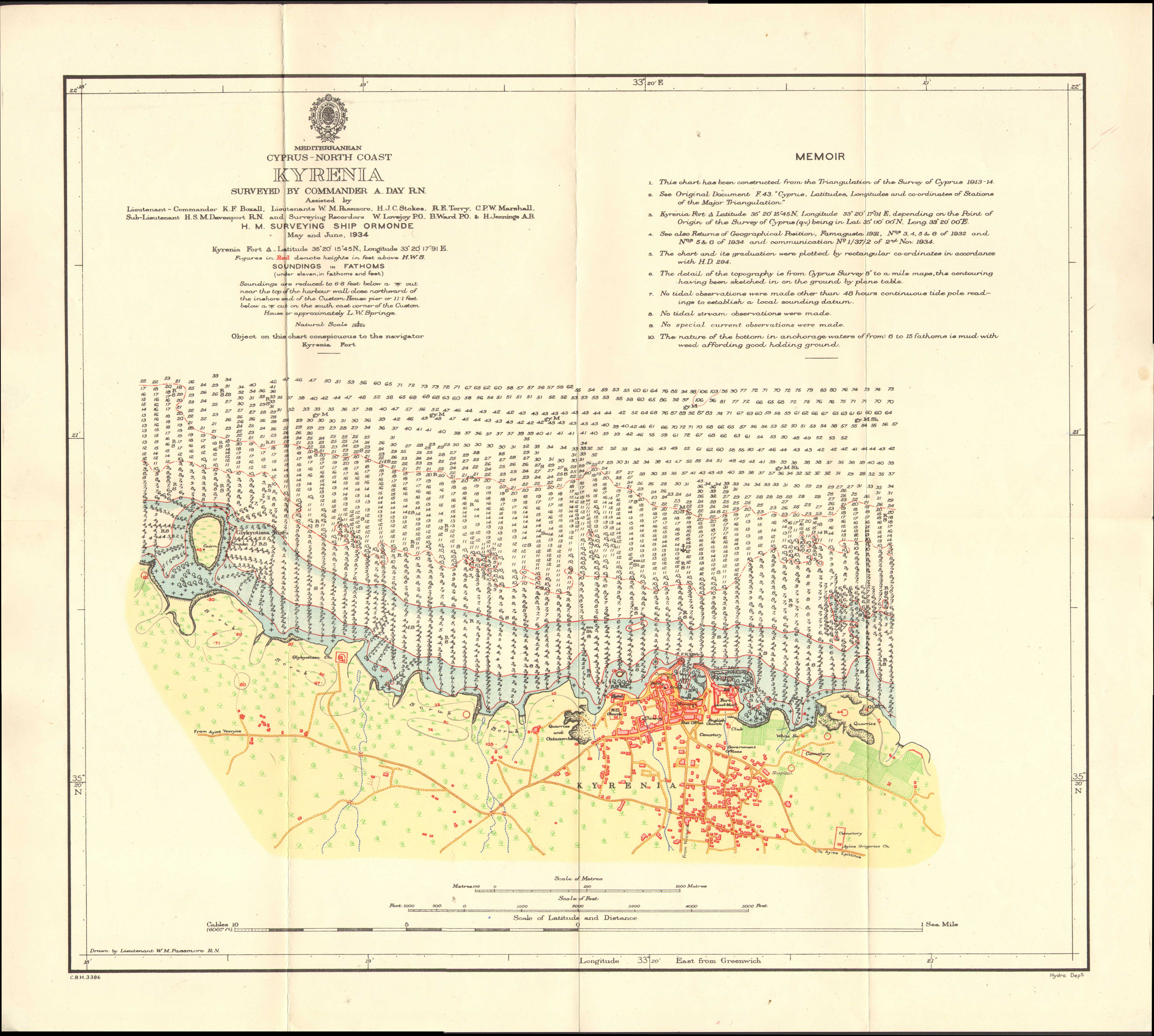
Fair chart of Kyrenia, surveyed by Day in HMS Ormonde in 1934

His first command, from June 1932, was HMS Fitzroy, surveying on the east coast of England and Scotland. He was then with HMS Ormonde in the Persian Gulf and Cyprus. He was promoted to Commander in 1934. From 1937 to 1940, he was Superintendent of Charts in the Hydrographic Department. He was promoted to Captain in 1940 and appointed Chief Staff Officer to the Flag Officer, Dover. He played a major part in planning the evacuation from Dunkirk in 1940. His surveying experience on the east coast of England, with its many treacherous sandbanks and strong tides, was invaluable in this task. He was Assistant Hydrographer in 1943 and 1944. This was at time when chart production was essential to the war effort, and seven million charts and maps were being printed each year.

Chart of Akyab (now Sittwe) Harbour surveyed by Day in White Bear in 1945

In November 1944, Day took over command of HMS White Bear, a yacht converted for surveying, and carrying printing equipment and staff. White Bear was then in Colombo, and took part in the Burma campaign (1944–1945) coordinating survey teams that were charting the many channels on the coast of Burma, and printing maps and charts for the assault forces. He was awarded the DSO for this operation. After the Japanese surrender, White Bear conducted surveys around the Malay Peninsula and in Indonesia, to assist re-establishment of normal navigation.

After the war, Day resumed his position as Assistant Hydrographer, and then in February 1948 took command of HMS Dalrymple, newly commissioned as a survey ship, working in the Mediterranean. In 1950 he was appointed Hydrographer of the Navy, a post he held until 1955. As Hydrographer, Day collaborated with the Decca Navigator Company to develop electronic systems for surveying using transportable shore stations. He was a supporter of international cooperation in Hydrography and Oceanography, leading the United Kingdom Delegation to the International Hydrographic Conference held in Monaco in April 1952. He was promoted to vice-admiral on 27 January 1953, and made a Knight Commander of the Order of the British Empire (KBE) in 1954. He retired in 1955.

After retirement, Day led a small team to carry out a hydrographic survey of Lake Nyasa In 1956 he was appointed coordinator of the International Geophysical Year, based in Brussels, but travelling extensively to facilitate the work of scientists from many countries that were taking part.

His final work was his history The Admiralty Hydrographic Service 1795-1919, which was published in 1967. The book gives a summary of the earlier part of the period, which was covered by Dawson's earlier Memoirs of Hydrography and a much more detailed account of the period from 1884-1919 with biographies of surveyors and tabulations of surveys and ships by year. He died on 17 July 1970 in Dover.

== Bibliography ==
- Day, Archibald (1955). "Hydrographic Surveys: The Purpose and the Choice of Scale". The International Hydrographic Review. 32 (1): 9–24.
- —— (1956). "Lake Nyasa hydrographic survey talk to the Nyasaland Society on 9 March 1956". The Nyasaland Journal. 9 (2): 57–64. JSTOR 29545777.
- —— (1957). "Some Organizational Aspects of the International Geophysical Year". The Journal of Navigation. 10 (3): 249–253. doi:10.1017/S0373463300016866. S2CID 130088780.
- —— (1967). The Admiralty Hydrographic Service, 1795-1919. H.M. Stationery Office. OCLC 1082894797.

== See also ==
- International Hydrographic Organization
