= HMS Scott =

Three ships of the Royal Navy have borne the name HMS Scott. The first ship was named after Sir Walter Scott, 1st Baronet. The later ships were named after the Antarctic explorer Robert Falcon Scott:

- HMS Scott (1917) was an Admiralty type destroyer leader. She was launched in 1917 and sunk in 1918 by a German submarine.
- HMS Scott (J79) was a survey ship launched in 1938. She was used as an escort vessel between 1939 and 1940 and was broken up in 1965.
- HMS Scott (H131) is an ocean survey ship launched in 1996 and currently in service.
