= HMS Dampier =

1948 Bay-class anti-aircraft frigate of the Royal Navy

History

United Kingdom
- Name: HMS Dampier
- Namesake: William Dampier
- Ordered: 23 January 1943
- Builder: Smiths Dock Company, South Bank, Middlesbrough
- Laid down: 7 August 1944
- Launched: 15 May 1945, as Herne Bay
- Commissioned: 4 May 1948, as Dampier
- Decommissioned: 31 January 1968
- Identification: Pennant number K611/A303
- Fate: Sold for scrapping, 1968
- Badge: On a Field White in front of 3 bars couped wavy Blue, a Roebuck's head erased Proper, gorged with a ducal crown Gold

General characteristics
- Class & type: Bay-class frigate
- Displacement: 1,600 long tons (1,626 t) standard; 2,530 long tons (2,571 t) full
- Length: 286 ft (87 m) p/p; 307 ft 3 in (93.65 m) o/a
- Beam: 38 ft 6 in (11.73 m)
- Draught: 12 ft 9 in (3.89 m)
- Propulsion: 2 × Admiralty 3-drum boilers, 2 shafts, 4-cylinder vertical triple expansion reciprocating engines, 5,500 ihp (4,100 kW)
- Speed: 19.5 knots (36.1 km/h; 22.4 mph)
- Range: 724 tons oil fuel, 9,500 nmi (17,600 km) at 12 knots (22 km/h)
- Complement: 133
- Armament: 4 × 3-pounder saluting guns; Minesweeping gear aft

HMS Dampier was a survey ship of the Royal Navy, named after the explorer, author and privateer, William Dampier (1652–1715). Originally intended as a Bay-class anti-aircraft frigate, the ship was in commission from 1948 to 1968, spending her entire career based at Singapore, carrying out survey work.

== Construction ==
The ship was ordered on 23 January 1943 from Smiths Dock Company, South Bank, Middlesbrough, as the Loch-class frigate Loch Eil. The ship was laid down on 7 August 1944, but the contract was then changed, and the ship was completed to a revised design as a Bay-class anti-aircraft frigate, and launched on 15 May 1945 as Herne Bay (K611). Work on the ship was suspended on 26 September 1945, and she was towed to Chatham Dockyard. In July 1946 work recommenced to convert her into a survey ship. She was renamed Dampier and assigned the pennant number A303.

== Service history ==
Dampier was commissioned on 4 May 1948, and in June arrived at Singapore, which would be her home port for almost the next twenty years. There she was employed in carrying out oceanographic and hydrographic surveys around the coasts of Malaya, Borneo, and Hong Kong, in the South China and Java Seas, with annual refits in Hong Kong, and inspections at Singapore.

On 5 October 1967 Dampier finally left Singapore to return to the UK, arriving at Simon's Town, South Africa, on 17 November. A week later, after local exercises, it was discovered that the ship's starboard propeller shaft was broken. The ship was obliged to continue her voyage on only one shaft. At Freetown, Sierra Leone, she found that there was no suitable equipment available to make repairs. With only three weeks remaining to make the 3,000 miles back to England in time for Christmas, the ship took the unusual step of manufacturing and hoisting a set of sails. Three lug sails made from awning canvas were hoisted on 11 December, and four days later a set of square sails. With the assistance of this rig, Dampier arrived at Chatham on 23 December to be greeted by Flag Officer Medway and the Hydrographer of the Navy.

Dampier was decommissioned at Chatham on 31 January 1968 and reduced to the Reserve. The ship was later placed on the Disposal List, and then sold to a Belgian shipbreaker. She was towed away for breaking-up on 17 January 1969.

== Publications ==
- Colledge, J. J.; Warlow, Ben (2006) [1969]. Ships of the Royal Navy: The Complete Record of All Fighting Ships of the Royal Navy from the 15th Century to the Present (3rd Rev ed.). London: Chatham Publishing. ISBN 978-1-86176-281-8. OCLC 67375475.
