= Largo High School =

Largo High School may refer to:

- Largo High School (Florida), USA
- Largo High School (Maryland), USA

== See also ==
- Lagro High School, Quezon City, Philippines
