= HMS Owen =

1949 Bay-class anti-aircraft frigate of the Royal Navy

History

United Kingdom
- Name: HMS Owen
- Namesake: William Fitzwilliam Owen
- Ordered: 2 May 1943
- Builder: Hall, Russell & Company
- Laid down: 30 September 1944
- Launched: 19 October 1945
- Commissioned: 2 August 1949
- Decommissioned: 14 October 1965
- Renamed: Loch Muick; Thurso Bay
- Identification: Pennant number K640
- Fate: Scrapped 15 July 1970

General characteristics
- Class & type: Bay-class frigate
- Displacement: 1,600 long tons (1,626 t) standard; 2,530 long tons (2,571 t) full
- Length: 307 ft (94 m) o/a
- Beam: 38 ft 7 in (11.76 m)
- Draught: 12 ft 9 in (3.89 m)
- Installed power: 5,500 ihp (4,100 kW); 2 × Admiralty 3-drum boilers
- Propulsion: 2 shafts; 2 vertical triple-expansion steam engines
- Speed: 20 knots (37 km/h; 23 mph)
- Range: 9,500 nmi (17,600 km; 10,900 mi) at 12 knots (22 km/h; 14 mph)
- Complement: 133
- Armament: 4 × 3-pounder saluting guns; Minesweeping gear aft

HMS Owen was a Bay-class frigate built for the Royal Navy during World War 2.

== Design and description ==
Owen was converted into a survey vessel while still under construction. She displaced 1,600 long tons (1,600 t) at standard load and 2,420 long tons (2,460 t) at deep load. The ship had an overall length of 307 feet (93.6 m), a beam of 38 feet 7 inches (11.8 m) and a draught of 12 feet 9 inches (3.9 m). She was powered by two vertical triple-expansion steam engines, each driving one shaft, using steam provided by two Admiralty three-drum boilers. The engines produced a total of 5,500 shaft horsepower (4,100 kW) and gave a maximum speed of 20 knots (37 km/h; 23 mph). Owen carried a maximum of 580 long tons (590 t) of fuel oil that gave her a range of 10,000 nautical miles (19,000 km; 12,000 mi) at 10 knots (19 km/h; 12 mph). The ship's complement was 133 officers and ratings.

The survey ships were armed only with four 3-pounder saluting guns.

== Construction and career ==
She was named for the explorer and naval officer William Fitzwilliam Owen. She was originally laid down as the Loch-class vessel Loch Muick, and re-ordered as Thurso Bay while building. She was completed as Owen, modified for use as a survey vessel for dealing with the large numbers of uncharted wrecks and mines around the British Isles as a result of World War II. For this purpose she was fitted for minesweeping.

== Bibliography ==
- Campbell, N. J. M. (1980). "Great Britain (including Empire Forces)". In Chesneau, Roger (ed.). Conway's All the World's Fighting Ships 1922–1946. Conway Maritime Press. pp. 2–85. ISBN 0-85177-146-7.
- Colledge, J. J.; Warlow, Ben & Bush, Steve (2020). Ships of the Royal Navy: The Complete Record of all Fighting Ships of the Royal Navy from the 15th Century to the Present (5th revised and updated ed.). Seaforth Publishing. ISBN 978-1-5267-9327-0.
- Friedman, Norman (2006). British Destroyers and Frigates, the Second World War and After. Naval Institute Press. ISBN 1-86176-137-6.
- Lenton, H. T. (1998). British & Empire Warships of the Second World War. Naval Institute Press. ISBN 1-55750-048-7.
