= HMS Bigbury Bay =

1945 Bay-class anti-aircraft frigate of the Royal Navy

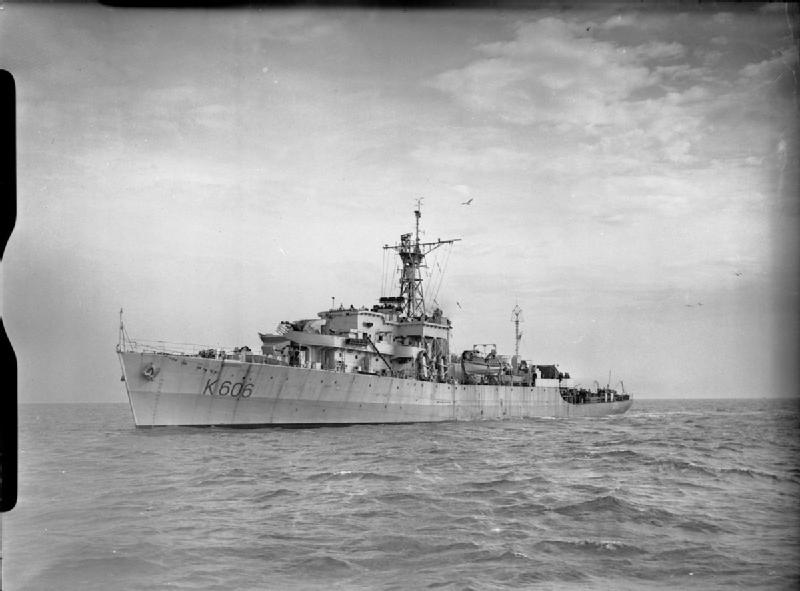
- HMS Bigbury Bay in 1945

History

United Kingdom
- Name: HMS Bigbury Bay
- Namesake: Bigbury Bay, Devon
- Builder: Hall, Russell & Company, Aberdeen
- Laid down: 30 March 1944
- Launched: 16 November 1944
- Commissioned: 10 July 1945
- Home port: HMNB Portsmouth, Hampshire
- Identification: Pennant number K606
- Fate: Sold on 12 May 1959 to Portugal.
- Badge: On a Field Per fess Red and Black, a gridiron Gold

Portugal
- Name: NRP Pacheco Pereira
- Namesake: Duarte Pacheco Pereira
- Acquired: 12 May 1959
- Fate: Sold for breaking up, 6 July 1970.

General characteristics
- Class & type: Bay-class anti-aircraft frigate
- Displacement: 1,600 long tons standard, 2,530 tons full
- Length: 286 ft (87 m) p/p; 307 ft 3 in (93.65 m) o/a
- Beam: 38 ft 6 in (11.73 m)
- Draught: 12 ft 9 in (3.89 m)
- Propulsion: 2 × Admiralty 3-drum boilers, 2 shafts, 4-cylinder vertical triple expansion reciprocating engines, 5,500 ihp (4,100 kW)
- Range: 724 tons oil fuel, 9,500 nmi (17,600 km) at 12 knots (22 km/h)
- Complement: 157
- Armament: 4 × QF 4-inch (100 mm) Mark XVI on 2 twin mounting HA/LA Mk.XIX; 4 × 40 mm Bofors A/A on 2 twin mounts Mk.V; 4 × 20 mm Oerlikon A/A on 2 twin mounts Mk.V; 1 × Hedgehog 24 barrel A/S projector; 2 rails and 4 throwers for 50 depth charges

HMS Bigbury Bay was a Bay-class anti-aircraft frigate of the British Royal Navy, named for Bigbury Bay in Devon.

The ship was originally ordered on 19 January 1943 as a Loch-class frigate to be named Loch Carloway, but the order was changed before construction began. She was laid down on 30 May 1944 as Job Number J11825 by Hall Russell at Aberdeen, launched on 16 November 1944, and completed on 12 July 1945 with the pennant number K606.

== Service history ==
Following sea trials Bigbury Bay was prepared for service with the British Pacific Fleet. Based at Hong Kong from December 1945, she carried out patrols of the Chinese coast, refitting at Sydney, Australia, in mid-1946, then taking part in exercises with ships of the United States Navy around Japan.

In February 1947 she was transferred to the Mediterranean Fleet, stationed at Haifa with the 5th Frigate Flotilla to carry out patrols to intercept ships bringing illegal Jewish immigrants to Palestine.

In March 1948 Bigbury Bay left the Mediterranean for the West Indies, where she would remain for the next nine years, making regular return trips to Portsmouth to refit, as well as three tours of duty as guard ship at the Falkland Islands. As part of the West Indies Squadron she made visits to ports along the coast of the southern United States, Central and South America, including an unusual trip up the Amazon River to Manaos in 1951, and rounding Cape Horn in late 1954 to visit Chile and Peru before transiting the Panama Canal to return to Bermuda. In 1956 her crew formed the Colour guard for the ceremony at the Cathedral of the Most Holy Trinity, Bermuda of the laying-up of the Queen's Colour for the closure of the North America and West Indies Station, and also provided the Guard at Hamilton during the meeting between Prime Minister Harold Macmillan and U.S. President Dwight D. Eisenhower the following year.

In early 1957, Bigbury Bay visited Havana, Cuba, the last British warship to do so until the visit of the destroyer Manchester on 15 November 2010. In May Bigbury Bay visited Jamestown, Virginia to join the celebrations marking the 350th anniversary of the founding of the colony.

Bigbury Bay returned to the UK in June to refit, and in November 1957 came under of the Commander-in-Chief, South Atlantic at Simon's Town, South Africa, taking part in fleet exercises and making visits to ports along the coasts of East and West Africa.

Following the revolution in Iraq in July 1958 the ship was transferred to the Mediterranean and sailed to Aden for patrol duty in the Red Sea, and carried out Guard ship duty at Aqaba. In November she returned to the UK and was put into Reserve.

Bigbury Bay was sold to Portugal on 12 May 1959 and renamed NRP Pacheco Pereira. The ship remained active in the Portuguese Navy until sold for breaking-up on 6 July 1970.

== Publications ==
Colledge, J. J.; Warlow, Ben (2006) [1969]. Ships of the Royal Navy: The Complete Record of All Fighting Ships of the Royal Navy from the 15th Century to the Present (3rd Rev ed.). London: Chatham Publishing. ISBN 978-1-86176-281-8. OCLC 67375475.
