= A&P Group =

Company

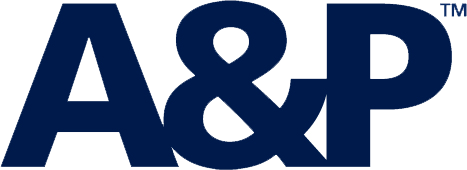
- Type: Private company
- Industry: Marine engineering
- Headquarters: Hebburn, England
- Number of locations: 2 (previously 3)
- Services: Ship repair and ship conversion
- Revenue: ▲£124.3 million GBP (2013)
- Owner: Atlantic & Peninsula Marine Services (50% Peel Group, 50% investors in Cammell Laird)
- Number of employees: over 600
- Website: www.ap-group.co.uk

A&P Group Limited is the largest ship repair and conversion company in the United Kingdom, with three shipyards located in Hebburn, Middlesbrough and Falmouth. The company undertakes a wide variety of maintenance and repair work on commercial and military ships with projects ranging from a two-day alongside repair period through to multimillion UK pound conversion projects lasting for a year or more.

== History ==
The company was established in 1971 as A&P-Appledore International(APA), a joint venture technology transfer consultancy between British shipbuilding companies Austin & Pickersgill and Appledore Shipbuilders, and focused on ship design and construction. Initially the business was directed towards the growing Far East market, as well as the Americas and Europe. Based on the production engineering solutions developed for the innovative 'ship factory' at Appledore in the late 1960s, and subsequently at Pallion, Sunderland, APA developed the formal Build Strategy approach. This was taken up by Hyundai when it developed the first modern shipyard in South Korea at Ulsan in the 1970s. The Build Strategy template was subsequently adopted in British Shipbuilders' other shipyards, and in the USA.

Following sale of Appledore Shipbuilders to the government at the time of the collapse of its parent Court Line in 1974, and the subsequent nationalisation of Austin & Pickersgill in 1977, the shareholding of APA was purchased in a management buyout. APA acquired the shiprepair facilities of Falmouth Docks & Engineering Company in 1984 and it remains one of the company's two major centres. The company subsequently focused on shiprepairs rather than shipbuilding, becoming A&P Group in 1995 and being acquired by Royal Bank Development Capital in 1997.

Over the years the company has operated shiprepair facilities in many parts of the world. From the mid-1970s until privatisation in 1994, the Neorion shiprepair yard on Syros was managed for the Government of Greece. Dubai Drydocks opened in 1983 under APA management. The takeover of the former naval dockyard at Gibraltar as "Gibrepair" in 1985 was short-lived, a victim of local social politics.

In 2001 the A&P acquired Cammell Laird's shipyards in Birkenhead, Teesside and Tyneside. In 2005 A&P sold the Birkenhead yard to Northwestern Shiprepairers & Shipbuilders and closed its facilities in Southampton (King George V Dock) and the four-dock complex in Wallsend, in order to focus all ship repair activity in its newer facilities in Hebburn (A&P Tyne). A&P Tees at Middlesbrough was retained to support the important Southern North Sea offshore oil and gas operations and dredging contractors; the strategically situated Falmouth operation (A&P Falmouth) was also retained.

In 2009 A&P was fully acquired by Cardiff property developer Bailey Group; that company had previously acquired a 50% stake in 2006. In 2011 A&P Group was acquired by Atlantic & Peninsula Marine Services, which also has an interest in Cammell Laird.

In 2023 ACPL was formed as the parent company of the A&P Group and Cammell Laird. In June 2026 ACPL was purchased by Balaena with shipyards in Falmouth, Merseyside and Tyneside to be rebranded as Balaena Falmouth, Balaena Mersey and Balaena Tyne.

== Operational centres ==
As one of only two remaining commercial ship repair companies in the United Kingdom, along with Cammell Laird, A&P Group is an important service provider for ship owners and managers operating in North West Europe. A&P Group employs over 1,000 skilled staff (678 employees in 2013 plus agency workers) in the North East and South West of England.

=== A&P Tyne ===
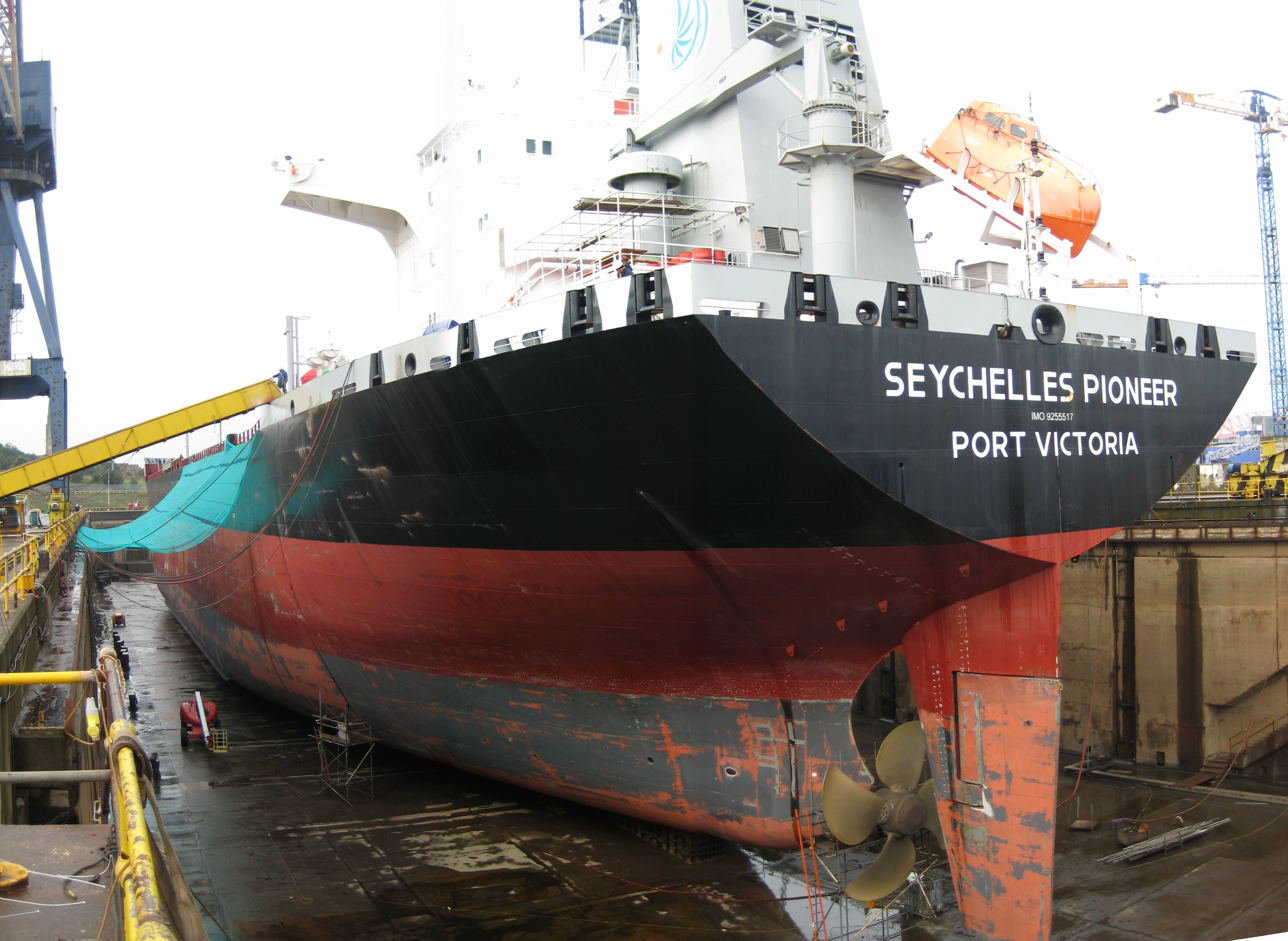
A chemical tanker being repaired in the A&P Tyne dry dock

A&P Tyne is located at Hebburn on the River Tyne. The facility consists of two dry docks (only one is currently in use), two quays and a large steel fabrication shed. The facility also has eight cranes lifting up to 100 tonnes, a steel workshop, joinery workshop and engineering workshop.

The dry dock at A&P Tyne is the largest on the east coast of the UK. It is 259 metres (850 ft) long, 45.7 metres (150 ft) wide and has a depth of 5.6 metres (18 ft) below the datum of navigational charts allowing it to accommodate a wide variety of ships. The two quays are Bede Quay and West Quay.

=== A&P Tees ===
A&P Tees was located in Middlesbrough on the River Tees. The yard had two dry docks and six cranes ranging up to forty tonnes lifting capacity. Dry dock number one was 175.4 metres (575 ft) long, 23.4 metres (77 ft) wide and had a depth of 1.7 metres (5 ft 7 in) below chart datum. Dry dock number two was 120 metres (390 ft) long, 18.6 metres (61 ft) wide and had a depth below chart datum of 0.37 metres (1 ft 3 in). Like A&P Tyne, A&P Tees had a wide variety of workshops and fabrication sheds around the site. In mid-2024 A&P Group ceased operations at its Tees facility in a strategic move to consolidate its North East operations into its more extensive facility in Hebburn.

=== A&P Falmouth ===
A&P Falmouth is located in Falmouth, Cornwall. The yard is located in the third largest natural deep water harbour in the world, and is the largest ship repair complex in the UK. A&P Falmouth has three large graving docks and can accommodate ships up to 100,000 DWT.

Number two dock (Queen Elizabeth Dock) is the largest graving dock and is 252.8 metres (829 ft) long, 39.6 metres (130 ft) wide and a has depth below chart datum of 5.6 metres (18 ft). Dock number three is 220.98 metres (725 ft) long, 28.04 metres (92 ft) wide and a depth below chart datum of 3.2 metres (10 ft). Dock number four is 172.5 metres (566 ft) long, 26.21 metres (86 ft) wide and has a depth below chart datum of 2.9 metres (9 ft 6 in). There are four wharfs in the yard: County Wharf, Duchy Wharf, Queens Wharf and "South of Queens Wharf".

The yard has six cranes, with a total load capacity of 60 tonnes. It has also a steel fabrication shed, engineering workshop, electrical workshop and joinery workshop.
