= Type 291 radar =

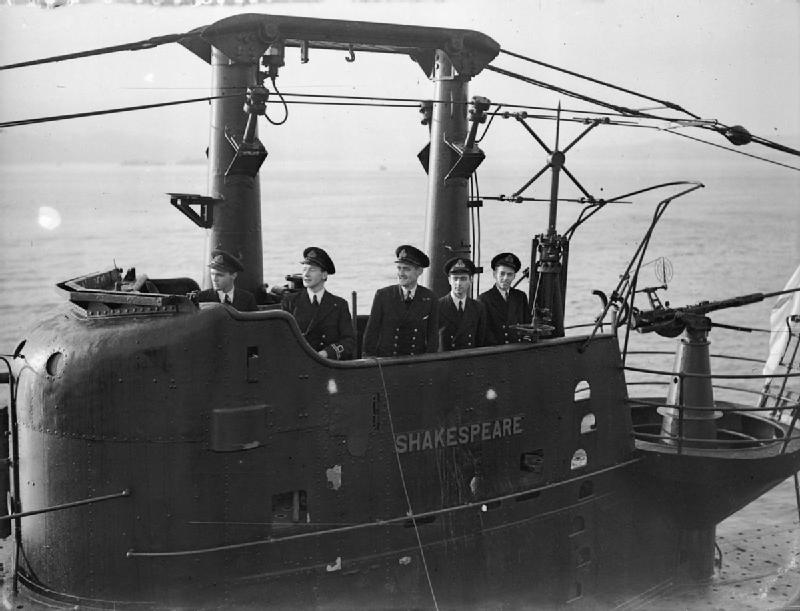
- The conning tower of the submarine HMS Shakespeare showing a Type 291W radar set
- Country of origin: United Kingdom
- Introduced: 1942
- Type: Search radar
- Frequency: 214 MHz
- PRF: 500 per second
- Beamwidth: 40°
- Pulsewidth: 1.1 μs
- Range: 9 nmi (17 km; 10 mi)
- Power: 100 kW

The Type 291 radar was designed as a search radar for ships destroyer-sized and smaller in 1942. By the end of the Second World War it had been installed in almost every British and Commonwealth destroyer and escort ship as well as many submarines, naval trawlers, and motor torpedo boats. Some sets were furnished to the Soviet Union for their destroyers as a part of Lend-Lease.

The initial model of the radar had separate transmitting and receiving antennas, but they were soon combined. The original Type 291 had a hand-steered antenna and it was replaced by Types 291M, P, and Q with power training and a plan position indicator. U and W variants with different antennas were produced for coastal craft and submarines respectively.

== Bibliography ==
- Friedman, Norman (1981). Naval Radar. Conway Maritime Press. ISBN 0-85177-238-2.
- Watson, Raymond C., Jr. (2009). Radar Origins Worldwide: History of Its Evolution in 13 Nations Through World War II. Trafford. ISBN 978-1-4269-2111-7.
