= Burntisland Burgh Chambers =

Municipal building in Burntisland, Scotland

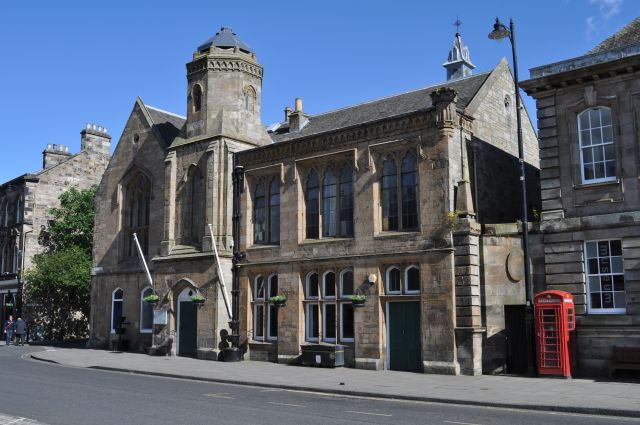
- Burntisland Burgh Chambers

- Shown in Fife
- 56.0590°N 3.2341°W
- Location: High Street, Burntisland

History
- Built: 1846

Site notes
- Architect: John Henderson
- Architectural style: Gothic Revival style

Listed Building – Category B
- Official name: Town Hall, 104 High Street, Burntisland
- Designated: 3 August 1977
- Reference no.: LB22820

Burntisland Burgh Chambers is a municipal structure in the High Street, Burntisland, Fife, Scotland. The building, which is the meeting place of the Burntisland Community Council, is a Category B listed building.

== History ==
The first municipal building in Burntisland was a tolbooth which dated back to 1598. Several local Covenanters were incarcerated in the tolbooth during the Killing Time in the early 1680s and, later, some members of the Catholic Church were imprisoned there after the Glorious Revolution in 1688. By the early 1840s, despite being repaired several times, the tolbooth had become dilapidated and the burgh leaders decided to erect a new building on the same site.

The new building was designed by John Henderson in the Gothic Revival style, built in ashlar stone and was completed in 1846. The design involved an asymmetrical main frontage of two bays facing the High Street. The left-hand bay, which was gabled, featured two arched windows on the ground floor, a tripartite window with tracery on the first floor and a quatrefoil above. The right-hand bay, which was slightly projected forward, took the form of a four-stage tower: there was an arched doorway with a hood mould in the first stage, a lancet window flanked by buttresses in the second stage, an octagonal tower head in the third stage and a belfry with louvres in the fourth stage, with a spire and weather vane above. Internally, the principal room was the burgh council chamber on the first floor.

A clock, designed and manufactured by James Ritchie & Son of Broxburn was installed in the fourth stage of the tower to celebrate the Golden Jubilee of Queen Victoria in 1887. The building was extended by three extra bays to the west in 1906: the extension was fenestrated by mullioned and transomed windows, with arched window heads on the ground floor and cusped window heads on the first floor.

The town hall continued to serve as the meeting place of the burgh council for much of the 20th century but ceased to be the local seat of government when the enlarged Kirkcaldy District Council was formed in 1975. Instead the building became the meeting place of the Burntisland Community Council. In 2013, the upper part of the tower was deemed unsafe and the fourth stage and the spire were dismantled and the stone was placed in storage. In November 2021, the community council confirmed that it was seeking funding for plans to redevelop the burgh chambers and to restore the upper part of the tower.

Works of art in the town hall include a portrait by William Oliphant Hutchison of the founder of Burntisland Shipbuilding Company, Sir Wilfrid Ayre.

== See also ==
- List of listed buildings in Burntisland, Fife
