= Ariège =

Ariège may refer to:

- Ariège (department), a department in the Occitanie region of southwestern France, named after the river of the same name
- Ariège (river), a river in southern France
- SS Ariège, a cargo ship
- Ariege, a filly that is a descendant of Kentucky Derby winner Northern Dancer, via Kostroma
