= TCE =

TCE may refer to:

== Education ==
- Tasmanian Certificate of Education, the main credential awarded to students who successfully complete senior high school studies in Tasmania, Australia
- Thiagarajar College of Engineering, an autonomous institution in Madurai, Tamil Nadu, India
- Tilburg Center of Entrepreneurship, academic institution in the Netherlands

== Measurement ==
- Temperature Coefficient of Expansion, also referred to as Coefficient of thermal expansion, a measure of the change in size of an object as its temperature changes
- Tail conditional expectation, a risk measure associated with the more general value at risk
- Time charter equivalent, a measurement to compare shipping companies' performance
- Tonne of coal equivalent (tce), is a unit of energy defined as the amount of energy released by burning one tonne of coal.

== Companies and organizations ==
- Tata Consulting Engineers (TCE) Limited, an engineering consulting firm based in India
- Texas Campaign for the Environment a non-profit organization on health and environmental issues in Texas, United States

== Performing arts ==
- Théâtre des Champs-Élysées, a renowned entertainment venue in Paris

== Business, finance, and economics ==
- Tax Counseling for the Elderly, one of the United States Internal Revenue Service#Programs that offers free tax help to citizens of age 60 or older
- Tangible common equity, the subset of shareholders' equity of a company that is not preferred equity and not intangible assets
- Transaction cost economics, the social science that analyzes the costs incurred in making an economic exchange

== Science and technology ==
- The Chemical Engineer, a journal which was titled TCE from 2002 to 2015
- Trichloroethylene, an industrial solvent, commonly found as a groundwater contaminant
- Translation Control Entry, the IOMMU hardware in some IBM server computers
- Technology-critical element in chemistry

== Other uses ==
- Traditional cultural expressions, along with traditional knowledge, a form of indigenous knowledge
- Treaty establishing a Constitution for Europe, a proposed constitutional treaty of the European Union
- Tung Chung East station, Hong Kong (MTR station code)
- Tasha's Cauldron of Everything, an accessory for the 5th edition Dungeons & Dragons roleplaying game
