= MV Sheaf Mount (1944) =

History
- Name: Empire Fancy (1944–47); Sheaf Mount (1947–57); Valldemosa (1957-61); Ardfinnan (1961-68); Court Harwell (1968-69)
- Owner: Ministry of War Transport (1944–45); Ministry of Transport (1945–47); W A Souter & Co Ltd (1947–57); Harrisons (Clyde) Ltd (1957–61); Mullion & Co Ltd, Hong Kong (1961–68); Mullion & Co Ltd, Gibraltar (1968–69)
- Operator: Haldin & Phillips Ltd (1945) W A Souter & Co Ltd (1945–57); Harrisons (Clyde) Ltd (1957–61); Mullion & Co Ltd, Hong Kong (1961–68); Mullion & Co Ltd, Gibraltar (1968–69)
- Port of registry: Burntisland, United Kingdom (1944–61); Hong Kong (1961–68); Gibraltar (1968–69)
- Builder: Burntisland Shipbuilding Company
- Yard number: 286
- Launched: 16 November 1944
- Completed: January 1945
- Maiden voyage: 1 February 1945
- Out of service: 9 June 1969
- Identification: United Kingdom Official Number 180349 (1944–61); Code Letters GJWX (1944–61); IMO number: 5022716
- Fate: Scrapped

General characteristics
- Type: Cargo ship
- Tonnage: 7,123 GRT; 4,701 NRT
- Length: 427 ft 1 in (130.18 m)
- Beam: 57 ft 0 in (17.37 m)
- Draught: 27 ft 4.75 in (8.35 m)
- Depth: 35 ft 4 in (10.77 m)
- Propulsion: Diesel engine, single screw propeller

Sheaf Mount was a 7,123 GRT cargo ship that was built in 1944 by Burntisland Shipbuilding Company, Burntisland, Fife, United Kingdom as Empire Fancy for the Ministry of War Transport (MoWT). In 1947, she was sold and renamed Sheaf Mount. A further sale in 1957 saw her renamed Valldemosa. In 1961, she was sold to Hong Kong and renamed Ardfinnan. A sale in 1968 to Gibraltar saw her renamed Court Harwell. She was scrapped in Hong Kong in 1969.

== Description ==
The ship was built in 1944 by Burntisland Shipbuilding Company, Burntisland, Fife. She was yard number 286.

The ship was 427 feet 1 inch (130.18 m) long, with a beam of 57 feet 0 inches (17.37 m). She had a depth of 35 feet 4 inches (10.77 m) and a draught of 27 feet 4.75 inches (8.35 m). She was assessed at 7,123 GRT, 4,701 NRT.

The ship was propelled by a two-stroke Single Cycle, Single Action diesel engine, which had three cylinders of 23 3/4 inches (60 cm) diameter by 91 5/16 inches (232 cm) stroke driving a screw propeller. The engine was built by William Doxford & Sons, Sunderland, County Durham. It was rated at 516 nhp.

== History ==
Empire Fancy was launched on 16 November 1944 and completed in January 1945. The Code Letters GJWX and United Kingdom Official Number 180349 were allocated. Her port of registry was Burntisland. She was initially operated under the management of Haldin Phillips & Co Ltd, later being placed under the management of W A Souter & Co Ltd.

Empire Fancy made her maiden voyage as part of Convoy FS1715, which departed from Methil, Fife on 1 February 1945 arrived at Southend, Essex on 3 February. She left the convoy at Sunderland, County Durham on 2 February. She departed on 18 March to join Convoy FS1760, which had departed from Methil that day and arrived at Southend on 20 March. She then joined Convoy ON292, which departed from Southend on 23 March and arrived at New York, United States on 8 April.

Empire Fancy departed from New York on 2 May 1945 and joined Convoy UGS90, which departed from the Hampton Roads, Virginia on 3 May and dispersed at sea on 18 May. She arrived at Port Said, Egypt on 15 May. Empire Fancy then sailed to Suez, from where she departed on 26 May for Aden, arriving on 31 May. She sailed the next day for Colombo, Ceylon, where she arrived on 9 June, sailing later that day for Calcutta, India arriving on 15 July. Empire Fancy sailed on 29 July for Cochin, India, arriving on 6 August. She departed on 18 August for Lourenço Marques, Mozambique, where she arrived on 1 August. She departed from Lourenço Marques on 11 September for Aden, arriving on 23 September and sailing the next day for Suez, where she arrived on 29 September.

Empire Fancy then sailed to Kosseir, Egypt, from where she departed on 20 October for Aden, arriving on 24 October. She sailed two days later for Albany, Western Australia, arriving on 19 November. She sailed two days later for Hobart, Tasmania arriving on 27 November and sailing the next day for Melbourne, New South Wales, where she arrived on 1 December. In June 1946, Captain John Harmann Korn was awarded an OBE in the 1946 King's Birthday Honours List.

The Ministry of Transport sold Empire Fancy to her managers in 1947. She was renamed Sheaf Mount. In 1957, Sheaf Mount was sold for £550,000 to Harrisons (Clyde) Ltd and was renamed Valldemosa. In 1961, Valldemosa was sold to Mullion & Co Ltd, Hong Kong and was renamed Ardfinnan. With the introduction of IMO Numbers in the late 1960s, Ardfinnan was allocated the IMO Number 5022716. In 1968, Ardfinnan was sold to Mullion & Co Ltd, Gibraltar and was renamed Court Harwell. She arrived at Hong Kong on 9 June 1969 for scrapping.
