= Sheaf Mount =

Four ships operated by the Sheaf Steam Shipping Co were named Sheaf Mount.

- SS Sheaf Mount (1914), in service 1919–30
- SS Sheaf Mount (1924), in service 1939–42
- MV Sheaf Mount (1944), in service 1945–57, IMO number: 5022716
- MV Sheaf Mount (1965), in service 1965–72, IMO number: 6500959
