= Christensen Canadian African Lines =

Defunct Norwegian cargo shipping company

Christensen Canadian African Lines was a Norwegian cargo shipping company that traded between Canada and Africa from 1948 until 2000.

== History ==
Consul Lars Christensen founded the company in 1948 after a suggestion by his friend Alfred Clegg of Kerr Steamship as a liner service provider between east coast of Canada and South Africa. The first sailing was undertaken by the Norden in May 1948 with 1890 tons of cargo on board. CCAL aimed to compete with the British Elder Dempster Lines of Liverpool, which operated a liner service between South Africa and North America via West Africa. The first year of operation showed a loss, which was however soon recovered in the following years.

The company, which was initially named Christensen Canadian South African Lines (CCSAL), was owned and operated by Lars Christensen's Thor Dahl shipping company and appointed Kerr Steamship to providing the agency network in North America and Africa. CCSAL started up with three vessels setting up a monthly service: the chartered Norden and Valhall and the owned Thorscape (formerly the Philae). Soon Burntisland Shipbuilding Company supplied three new ships: Thorshall, Thorstrand and Thorsisle which were delivered between November 1948 and June 1949.

In 1951 Holland Africa line was appointed to operate the agencies in Africa. Kerr remained as agent for Canada only.

As traffic grew, it was decided to supplement the Burntisland vessels with larger and faster ships. Thor Dahl contracted three vessels of about 8000 tons deadweight in Bergen: Thorsgaard delivered in 1952, Thorscape delivered in 1954 and Thor I delivered in 1955. Thorsisle was transferred to Pacific Islands Transport Line after delivery of Thorsgaard. Other Thor Dahl vessels operated in the CCSAL were Thorsdrott that carried fruit, Thorsdrake, built in Germany to a typical German design, and Thorscarrier.

The main export cargo from Canada was newsprint, printing paper and other forest products. The bulk of this cargo from Canada was produced in areas far from Montreal and it was necessary for the vessels to call at other ports in the Gulf of Saint Lawrence and Saint Lawrence River to load paper. Calls were also made at such ports as Corner Brook, Newfoundland, Baie-Comeau, Port-Alfred and Trois-Rivières in Quebec. The Saint Lawrence Seaway in those days could only accommodate vessels of up to about 3,000 DWT what meant that not all CCSAL vessels could make a call to this port as they had a greater deadweight tonnage. In Africa ports in South Africa, Mozambique and later Tanzania and Kenya were called. With further growth of the traffic, calls to Mombasa, Tanga and Dar es Salaam in East Africa were added and the company name changed into Christensen Canadian African Lines (CCAL). CCAL also started to call at some West African ports.

Thor Dahl then contracted a new trio at their own Framnaes shipyard in Sandefjord which were faster and close to 9,000 DWT: Thorshope delivered in 1958, Thorsriver delivered in 1959 and Thorstream delivered in 1960.

Early in 1960 negotiations were opened between the South African Citrus Exchange in Pretoria and CCAL to carry oranges from Cape Town to Montreal. Due to this contract, the company began to equip vessels with simple means of cooling that was not installed before. Later, when the vessels had sophisticated cooling chambers installed with the required ventilation, boxes as packaging were replaced with cartons.

CCAL had then even larger vessels built at Framnaes. Thorswave was operated from 1968 until she was sold in 1983, having by then made 62 round trips for the line.

Due to the decrease of cargo in the early to middle 1980's, it was decided that CCAL would no longer serve East Africa on a regular basis and that the vessels would turn around at Durban, or often Richard's Bay. When the Canadian government decided to join international sanctions against South Africa the import of agricultural products from South Africa to Canada was lost. In order to compensate for this, a call to ports in Portugal was added, causing an increased transit time between Cape Town and Montreal of about nine days. The cargo shipped consisted mainly of container traffic, with a small amount of general cargo. A further growth of the traffic between South Africa and Canada was caused by the departure of CCAL's competitor Fednav Group from the market due to the sanctions against South Africa. Later CCAL dropped the Portugal call as the cargo loaded was heavy weighting causing a too deep draft for the port of Montreal which resulted in discharging some cargo Quebec City already what made this traffic unprofitable.

CCAL also operated oil tankers, but due to the 1973 oil crisis it converted an order for two new tankers into one for ice-strengthened 20,000 DWT multipurpose cargo ships: Thorscape and Thor I which could also carry 2,000 tonnes of fruit per sailing in refrigerated holds. Additionally they could carry 400 TEU of containers. These two vessels were the last new ships for A/S Thor Dahl and left the trade in the late 1990s due to increased maintenance costs and because the engines were not as fuel-efficient as in more modern vessels.

In August 2000 CP Ships purchased CCAL. CCAL operated at this time a 21-day multi-purpose service between Eastern Canada, Great Lakes and South Africa, using three "Astrakhan" type vessels. CCAL had provided uninterrupted service for more than 50 years. CP Ships integrated CCAL into its Americana Ships division and merged it into the Lykes Lines brand. TUI Group bought CP and merged in 2006 in Hapag-Lloyd.

== International identifiers ==
BIC Codes (Container prefixes): CACU

== Ships ==
Built	Name	Tonnage	Shipyard	Operated	Notes
	Norden				chartered Danish vessel
	Valhall				time chartered for a southbound voyage in June 1948
1948	Thorscape				(ex Philae) - American-built vessel, abt. 6000 t.d.w
1948	Thorshall	3,623 GRT	Burntisland Shipbuilding Company, Scotland		delivered November 1948
1949	Thorstrand	3,712 GRT	Burntisland Shipbuilding Company, Scotland	1949–1961	delivered April 1949, 1961 sold to Poseidon Schiffahrt, Hamburg
1949	Thorsisle	3,713 GRT	Burntisland Shipbuilding Company, Scotland	1949–1966	delivered June 1949, later transferred to Pacific Islands Transport Line, 1966 sold to Emil Offen & Co, Hamburg
1952	Thorsgaard	5,077 GRT	A/S Bergens mek.Verksteder, Bergen	1952–1958	1958 transferred to Norse Oriental Line, replaced by Thorshope; scrapped 1983
1954	Thorscape	4,981 GRT	A/S Bergens mek.Verksteder, Bergen	1954–1961	1961 transferred to Norse Oriental Line
1955	Thor I	4,993 GRT	A/S Bergens mek.Verksteder, Bergen	1955–1960	1960 transferred to Pacific Island Transport Lines
	Thorsdrott				name means "fruit"
1956	Thorsdrake	8,924 GRT	Flender-Werke, Lübeck, Germany		
1958	Thorshope	5,755 GRT	Framnæs Mek.Værksted, Sandefjord		
1959	Thorscarrier	8,590 GRT	Uddevallavarvet		
1959	Thorsriver	5,760 GRT	Framnæs Mek.Værksted, Sandefjord		
1960	Thorestream	5,758 GRT	Framnæs Mek.Værksted, Sandefjord		
1967	Thorestream	10,132 GRT	Framnæs Mek.Værksted, Sandefjord		
1977	Thorscape	14,794 GRT	Mitsui Engineering & Shipbuilding Company, Tamano		2000 MT cooled cargo, 400 TEU containers, multipurpose cargo ship
1978	Thor I	14,794 GRT	Mitsui Engineering & Shipbuilding Company, Tamano		2000 MT cooled cargo, 400 TEU containers, multipurpose cargo ship
