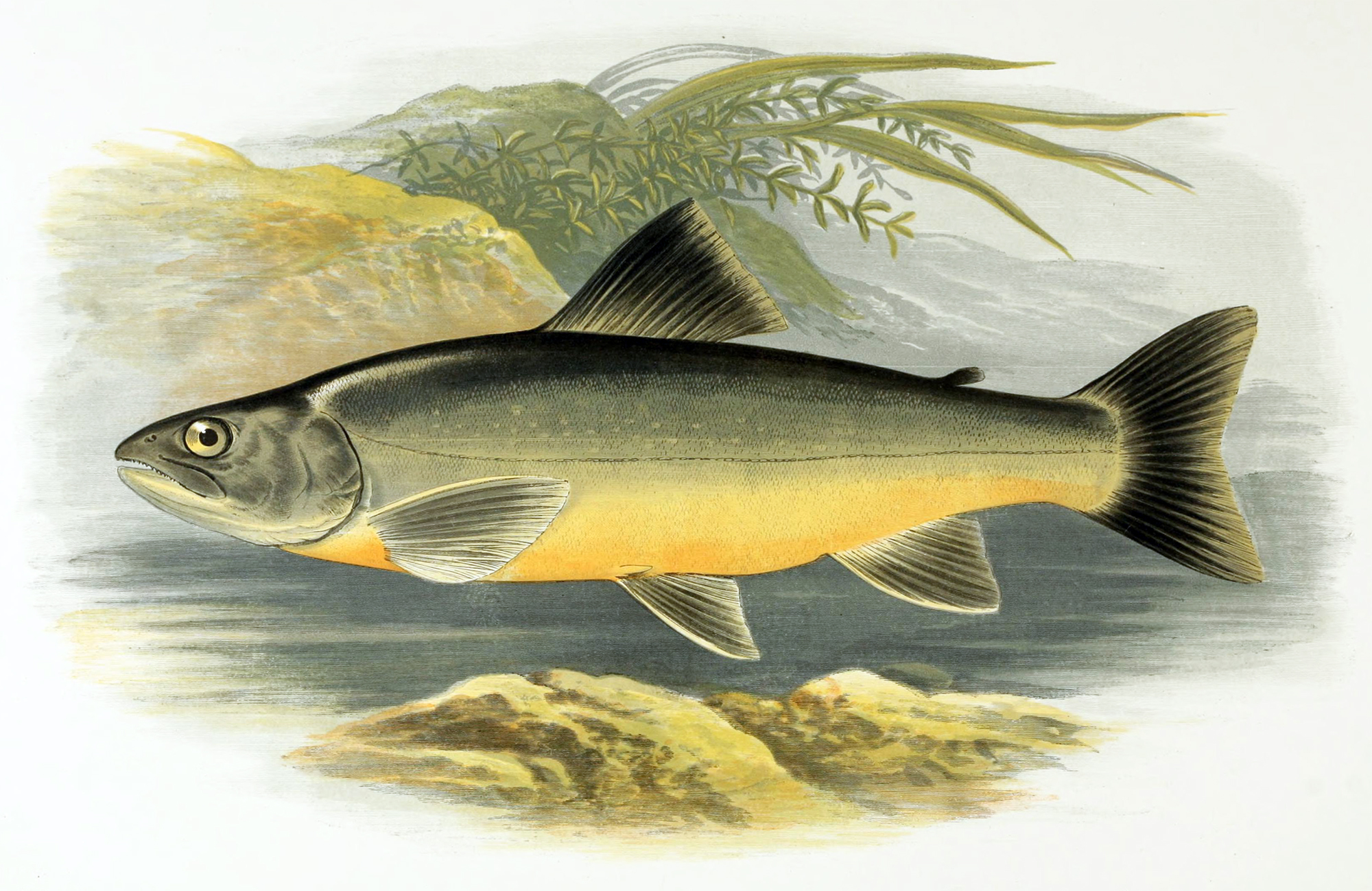

Conservation status
- Vulnerable (IUCN 3.1)

Scientific classification
- Kingdom: Animalia
- Phylum: Chordata
- Class: Actinopterygii
- Division: Teleostei
- Order: Salmoniformes
- Family: Salmonidae
- Genus: Salvelinus
- Species: S. killinensis

Binomial name
- Salvelinus killinensis (Günther, 1865)

Synonyms
- Salmo killinensis (Günther, 1866)

= Salvelinus killinensis =

Species of fish

Salvelinus killinensis, also known as Haddy charr, is a variety of charr found in certain lakes in Scotland.

Salvelinus killinensis lives in Loch Killin (Inverness-shire), after which it is named. It is also found in Loch Doine (Trossachs) and perhaps in Loch Builg (Cairngorms) as well. It lives in the deeper regions of the lakes, moving to shallower waters only during the spawning season.

Recently the presence of this charr has been reported in several other lakes of Scotland, although it may be not be Salvelinus killinensis, but another similar species.

== Taxonomy ==
The taxonomy of charrs is controversial. The Scottish authorities follow the practice which considers all the 200 Scottish charr populations, including that of Loch Killin, belonging to the single widespread circumpolar species Salvelinus alpinus (the Arctic charr). The IUCN Red List however follows division of Scottish (and other) charrs to several local species. In this view other putative Scottish charr species include Salvelinus gracillimus, Salvelinus mallochi, Salvelinus struanensis and Salvelinus youngeri, and further species would exist elsewhere in the UK and Ireland.

== Description ==
Salvelinus killinensis grows to a length of 16 in (41 cm). The snout is blunt, and the upper jaw is slightly longer than the lower jaw. The dorsal surface is dull, olive-grey or bluish-grey with pale spots, shading to yellowish-white on the belly. The fins are yellowish to reddish-brown, with a white margin on the front of the anal and pelvic fins.

== Ecology ==
This fish lives in the deepest parts of Loch Killin, which has a maximum depth of 67 ft (20 m). The only time it is seen is around September, when it moves to shallow waters to spawn. It feeds on such invertebrate prey as insect larvae, molluscs and crustaceans.
