= List of listed buildings in Burntisland, Fife =

This is a list of listed buildings in the parish of Burntisland in Fife, Scotland.

== List ==
Name	Location	Date listed	Grid ref. (Note: Sometimes known as OSGB36, the grid reference (where provided) is based on the British national grid reference system used by the Ordnance Survey. • "Guide to National Grid". Ordnance Survey. • "Get-a-map". Ordnance Survey.)	Geo-coordinates	Notes	LB number (Note: Historic Environment Scotland assign a unique alphanumeric identifier to each designated site in Scotland, for listed buildings this always begins with "LB", for example "LB12345".)	Image
21-41 (Odd Nos) Kirkgate				56°03′30″N 3°14′00″W	Category C(S)	22857	Upload Photo
6-10 (Even Nos) Kirkgate				56°03′32″N 3°14′02″W	Category C(S)	22858	Upload Photo
Lammerlaws Road, Albert Cottage With Boundary And Terrace Walls And Piers				56°03′30″N 3°13′26″W	Category C(S)	22863	Upload Photo
Manse Lane, Grayforth House With Stables, Gig House And Boundary Wall				56°03′41″N 3°13′50″W	Category C(S)	22869	Upload Photo
33-37 (Inclusive Nos) Harbour Place And 1-6 (Inclusive Nos) Forth Place				56°03′25″N 3°14′08″W	Category C(S)	22786	Upload Photo
Harbour Place, Smugglers Inn				56°03′30″N 3°14′09″W	Category B	22789	Upload another image
77-79 (Odd Nos) High Street				56°03′32″N 3°14′09″W	Category C(S)	22792	Upload Photo
95-99 (Odd Nos) High Street				56°03′34″N 3°14′04″W	Category C(S)	22794	Upload Photo
109-129 (Odd Nos) High Street				56°03′34″N 3°14′03″W	Category C(S)	22796	Upload Photo
225-229 (Odd Nos) High Street				56°03′35″N 3°13′55″W	Category B	22805	Upload Photo
239-251 (Odd Nos) High Street				56°03′35″N 3°13′54″W	Category C(S)	22807	Upload Photo
265-279 (Odd Nos) High Street, East Port Buildings With Gates And Balconies				56°03′36″N 3°13′51″W	Category B	22808	Upload Photo
40-48 (Even Nos) High Street, Including Former Green Tree Tavern				56°03′31″N 3°14′11″W	Category C(S)	22809	Upload Photo
190 High Street				56°03′34″N 3°13′54″W	Category C(S)	22818	Upload Photo
51 Kinghorn Road With Boundary Walls				56°03′43″N 3°13′40″W	Category B	22831	Upload Photo
89 And 91 Kinghorn Road With Boundary Walls				56°03′45″N 3°13′34″W	Category B	22839	Upload Photo
128 Kinghorn Road With Boundary Walls				56°03′50″N 3°13′16″W	Category C(S)	22844	Upload Photo
24-34 (Even Nos) Kirkbank Road With Boundary Walls				56°03′49″N 3°13′25″W	Category C(S)	22855	Upload Photo
6-9 (Inclusive Nos) Broomhill With Boundary Walls And Railings				56°03′36″N 3°14′06″W	Category A	22752	Upload Photo
Burntisland Harbour				56°03′19″N 3°14′16″W	Category B	22753	Upload another image
33-37 (Odd Nos) Craigkennochie Terrace With Boundary Walls				56°03′47″N 3°13′37″W	Category C(S)	22760	Upload Photo
55 Craigkennochie Terrace With Boundary Walls				56°03′47″N 3°13′31″W	Category C(S)	22764	Upload Photo
37 And 39 Cromwell Road With Boundary Walls				56°03′45″N 3°13′45″W	Category C(S)	22768	Upload Photo
16 Cromwell Road, With Outbuildings, Boundary Wall And Railings				56°03′41″N 3°13′46″W	Category C(S)	22769	Upload Photo
Aberdour Road, Starley Hall Lodge				56°03′38″N 3°15′48″W	Category C(S)	3683	Upload Photo
Balmuto, West Lodge With Boundary Walls, Gatepiers And Railings				56°04′51″N 3°16′46″W	Category C(S)	3685	Upload Photo
68 Kirkbank Road, Nether Grange With Dovecot, Formal Garden, Gatepiers, Gates And Boundary Walls				56°04′00″N 3°13′09″W	Category B	22856	Upload Photo
12-22 (Even Nos) Kirkgate				56°03′32″N 3°14′02″W	Category C(S)	22859	Upload Photo
24 Kirkgate				56°03′31″N 3°14′01″W	Category C(S)	22860	Upload Photo
Links Place, Drinking Fountain				56°03′36″N 3°13′48″W	Category C(S)	22866	Upload Photo
1-6 (Inclusive Nos) Melville Gardens				56°03′33″N 3°14′28″W	Category B	22870	Upload Photo
Rossend Castle With Boundary Walls And Railings				56°03′31″N 3°14′25″W	Category B	22872	Upload another image
32-42 (Even Nos) East Leven Street, The Parsonage With Railings And Boundary Wall				56°03′29″N 3°13′50″W	Category B	22776	Upload Photo
East Leven Street, Free Church Tower And Walls				56°03′30″N 3°13′59″W	Category C(S)	22779	Upload Photo
Harbour Place, Caspers				56°03′28″N 3°14′09″W	Category C(S)	22787	Upload Photo
71 And 73 High Street, Star Tavern				56°03′32″N 3°14′10″W	Category B	22791	Upload Photo
199-205 (Odd Nos) High Street				56°03′34″N 3°13′58″W	Category C(S)	22801	Upload Photo
231-237 (Odd Nos) High Street				56°03′35″N 3°13′55″W	Category C(S)	22806	Upload Photo
166-180 (Even Nos) High Street				56°03′34″N 3°13′55″W	Category C(S)	22815	Upload Photo
192-208 (Even Nos) High Street And Links Place				56°03′35″N 3°13′51″W	Category C(S)	22819	Upload Photo
39-43 (Odd Nos) Kinghorn Road With Boundary Wall And Mosaic Path				56°03′43″N 3°13′42″W	Category C(S)	22828	Upload Photo
49 Kirkbank Road				56°03′53″N 3°13′25″W	Category C(S)	22854	Upload Photo
5 And 7 Craigkennochie Terrace With Boundary Walls				56°03′45″N 3°13′41″W	Category C(S)	22757	Upload Photo
Cromwell Road, St Serf's Episcopal Church With Boundary Walls, Gatepiers And Gates				56°03′48″N 3°13′42″W	Category B	22772	Upload Photo
24 East Leven Street, Nellfield With Boundary Walls And Gatepiers				56°03′29″N 3°13′53″W	Category B	22775	Upload Photo
The Grange, Ivy Cottage Dovecot				56°03′55″N 3°14′46″W	Category C(S)	6680	Upload Photo
Grange House With Outbuildings, Boundary Walls, Gatepiers, Gates And Railings				56°03′56″N 3°14′44″W	Category B	3688	Upload Photo
Aberdour Road, Starley Hall With Outbuildings, Terrace Wall, Boundary Walls, Gatepiers And Railings				56°03′37″N 3°16′00″W	Category B	3694	Upload Photo
Seaforth Place, Royal Hotel With Steps And Railings				56°03′32″N 3°14′17″W	Category B	22875	Upload another image
97-119 (Odd Nos) Somerville Street				56°03′33″N 3°13′51″W	Category C(S)	22876	Upload Photo
West Broomhill Road, Railway Bridge				56°03′33″N 3°14′17″W	Category C(S)	22884	Upload Photo
Forth Place, Railway Station				56°03′26″N 3°14′02″W	Category C(S)	22782	Upload another image
1-3 (Inclusive Nos) Harbour Place				56°03′31″N 3°14′11″W	Category B	22784	Upload Photo
135-175 (Odd Nos) High Street				56°03′34″N 3°14′01″W	Category C(S)	22797	Upload Photo
213-217 (Odd Nos) High Street				56°03′35″N 3°13′56″W	Category C(S)	22803	Upload Photo
144 And 146 High Street Stephen And Son Mano's				56°03′33″N 3°13′58″W	Category C(S)	22814	Upload Photo
35 And 37 Kinghorn Road With Boundary Wall And Railings				56°03′43″N 3°13′42″W	Category C(S)	22827	Upload Photo
47-49 (Odd Nos) Kinghorn Road With Boundary Walls				56°03′43″N 3°13′41″W	Category C(S)	22830	Upload Photo
95 Kinghorn Road With Outbuildings And Boundary Walls				56°03′46″N 3°13′33″W	Category C(S)	22841	Upload Photo
129-131 (Odd Nos) Kinghorn Road With Boundary Walls				56°03′51″N 3°13′16″W	Category C(S)	22842	Upload Photo
130 Kinghorn Road With Boundary Wall				56°03′50″N 3°13′15″W	Category C(S)	22845	Upload Photo
Kinghorn Road, War Memorial With Boundary Wall				56°03′38″N 3°13′48″W	Category C(S)	22851	Upload Photo
39-45 (Odd Nos) Kirkbank Road With Boundary Walls				56°03′52″N 3°13′25″W	Category C(S)	22852	Upload Photo
9, 11, 12 And 15-23 (Odd Nos) Craigkennochie Terrace With Boundary Walls, Railings, Gate And Lamp Stanchion				56°03′46″N 3°13′40″W	Category B	22758	Upload Photo
43 Craigkennochie Terrace With Boundary Walls				56°03′47″N 3°13′35″W	Category C(S)	22762	Upload Photo
Aberdour Road, Bendameer Lodge With Outbuildings				56°03′39″N 3°15′43″W	Category B	3693	Upload Photo
26 And 28 Kirkgate, Leven Villa With Out-House, Boundary Wall, Gatepiers, Gates And Railings				56°03′30″N 3°14′02″W	Category C(S)	22861	Upload Photo
Lochies Road, Beach Tearoom, With Outbuilding, Gatepiers, Railings And Boundary Walls				56°03′47″N 3°13′17″W	Category B	22867	Upload Photo
Lochies Road, Seaside Cottage With Boundary Walls				56°03′48″N 3°13′13″W	Category B	22868	Upload Photo
East Leven Street, Burntisland Parish Church (Church Of Scotland)				56°03′29″N 3°13′57″W	Category A	22777	Upload another image
59-65 (Odd Nos) High Street				56°03′32″N 3°14′10″W	Category C(S)	22790	Upload Photo
83 High Street, Bank House Hotel With Boundary Walls				56°03′33″N 3°14′07″W	Category B	22793	Upload Photo
217- 223 (Odd Nos) High Street				56°03′35″N 3°13′56″W	Category C(S)	22804	Upload Photo
96-100 (Even Nos) High Street				56°03′32″N 3°14′05″W	Category C(S)	22811	Upload Photo
102 High Street, Public Library				56°03′32″N 3°14′04″W	Category B	22812	Upload Photo
15-19 (Odd Nos) Kinghorn Road With Boundary Walls				56°03′40″N 3°13′46″W	Category C(S)	22825	Upload Photo
29-33 Kinghorn Road, Links View With Outbuldings, Boundary Walls				56°03′41″N 3°13′44″W	Category C(S)	22826	Upload Photo
45 Kinghorn Road, Links House With Gazebo, Boundary Walls And Railings				56°03′43″N 3°13′41″W	Category C(S)	22829	Upload Photo
53-55 (Odd Nos) Kinghorn Road With Boundary Walls				56°03′43″N 3°13′39″W	Category C(S)	22832	Upload Photo
87 Kinghorn Road With Outbuilding And Boundary Walls				56°03′45″N 3°13′35″W	Category B	22838	Upload Photo
149 And 151 Kinghorn Road With Boundary Walls				56°03′52″N 3°13′09″W	Category C(S)	22843	Upload Photo
Kinghorn Road, Erskine United Free Church With Hall, Boundary Walls, Gatepiers And Gates				56°03′48″N 3°13′31″W	Category B	22850	Upload another image
47 Kirkbank Road With Gatepier And Boundary Wall				56°03′53″N 3°13′24″W	Category C(S)	22853	Upload Photo
1-3 (Inclusive Nos) Craigkennochie Terrace With Boundary Walls				56°03′45″N 3°13′43″W	Category C(S)	22756	Upload Photo
Craigkennochie Terrace Well-Head Stone				56°03′44″N 3°13′43″W	Category C(S)	22765	Upload Photo
3 And 5 Cromwell Road With Boundary Wall And Railings				56°03′38″N 3°13′51″W	Category B	22766	Upload Photo
33 And 35 Cromwell Road With Boundary Walls And Gatepiers				56°03′44″N 3°13′46″W	Category C(S)	22767	Upload Photo
67 East Leven Street, Pipe Band Hall				56°03′31″N 3°13′49″W	Category C(S)	22774	Upload Photo
Grange Road, Grange Distillery, Long Byre				56°03′57″N 3°14′31″W	Category B	6669	Upload Photo
Newbigging House With Gatepiers, Gates, Railings Boundary Walls And Lodge House				56°03′49″N 3°15′43″W	Category B	6674	Upload Photo
Newbigging Policies, Cottage, Ancillary Buildings And Gatepiers				56°03′48″N 3°15′48″W	Category B	6675	Upload Photo
Orrock, Cartshed				56°04′47″N 3°15′13″W	Category B	6676	Upload Photo
Orrock Farmhouse With Outbuilding And Boundary Walls				56°04′47″N 3°15′12″W	Category B	6677	Upload Photo
Starleyburn With Terrace Walls, Gates, Gatepiers And Boundary Walls				56°03′37″N 3°15′36″W	Category C(S)	6679	Upload Photo
Links Place, Crown Bar				56°03′33″N 3°13′49″W	Category C(S)	22865	Upload Photo
Somerville Square, Masonic Lodge, Dunearn 400				56°03′30″N 3°14′03″W	Category B	22881	Upload Photo
West Broomhill Road, Brae House, With Outbuilding And Boundary Walls				56°03′35″N 3°14′10″W	Category C(S)	22883	Upload Photo
Forth Place And Harbour Place, Forth Ports Plc Boundary Walls And Railings				56°03′25″N 3°14′07″W	Category C(S)	22781	Upload Photo
4-9 (Inclusive Nos) Harbour Place				56°03′31″N 3°14′11″W	Category C(S)	22785	Upload Photo
88-94 (Even Nos) High Street				56°03′32″N 3°14′05″W	Category C(S)	22810	Upload Photo
112 And 114 High Street				56°03′33″N 3°14′01″W	Category C(S)	22813	Upload Photo
182 And 184 High Street				56°03′34″N 3°13′55″W	Category C(S)	22816	Upload Photo
57-59 (Odd Nos) Kinghorn Road With Boundary Walls				56°03′44″N 3°13′39″W	Category B	22833	Upload Photo
61-63 (Odd Nos) Kinghorn Road With Outbuildings And Boundary Walls				56°03′44″N 3°13′38″W	Category B	22834	Upload Photo
136 Kinghorn Road With Boundary Wall				56°03′50″N 3°13′12″W	Category C(S)	22848	Upload Photo
Colinswell Dovecot				56°03′45″N 3°14′19″W	Category C(S)	22754	Upload Photo
Cowdenbeath Road, Binn Lodge With Boundary Walls, Gates And Gatepiers				56°03′54″N 3°13′56″W	Category C(S)	22755	Upload Photo
39 And 41 Craigkennochie Terrace With Boundary Walls				56°03′47″N 3°13′36″W	Category C(S)	22761	Upload Photo
32 Cromwell Road, Cromwell Bank With Outbuildings And Boundary Walls				56°03′42″N 3°13′45″W	Category C(S)	22770	Upload Photo
34 Cromwell Road, Cromwell House With Conservatory, Outbuildings Boundary Walls Gatepiers And Gates				56°03′43″N 3°13′44″W	Category B	22771	Upload Photo
Grange Road, Grange Distillery, Old Office House With Boundary Walls				56°03′58″N 3°14′34″W	Category B	6671	Upload Photo
Newbigging Dovecot				56°03′42″N 3°15′52″W	Category B	6673	Upload another image
Balbie Farmhouse And Boundary Walls				56°05′06″N 3°14′16″W	Category C(S)	3684	Upload Photo
Grange Road, Grange Distillery, 1 And 2 Grange Flats With Boundary Walls				56°03′57″N 3°14′30″W	Category C(S)	3690	Upload Photo
Rossend Gardens, Archway				56°03′33″N 3°14′20″W	Category B	22874	Upload Photo
2-8 (Even Nos) Somerville Street And Kirkgate				56°03′31″N 3°14′00″W	Category C(S)	22877	Upload Photo
South Greenmount Road, Bowling Club				56°03′50″N 3°13′21″W	Category C(S)	22882	Upload Photo
101-107 (Odd Nos) High Street				56°03′34″N 3°14′04″W	Category C(S)	22795	Upload Photo
195 And 197 High Street				56°03′34″N 3°13′58″W	Category C(S)	22800	Upload Photo
1 And 2 Kinghorn Road And 10 Cromwell Road With Boundary Wall And Railings				56°03′38″N 3°13′48″W	Category C(S)	22821	Upload Photo
3 And 5 Kinghorn Road And 12 Cromwell Road With Boundary Walls And Railings				56°03′39″N 3°13′47″W	Category C(S)	22822	Upload Photo
65-67 (Odd Nos) Kinghorn Road With Outbuildings And Boundary Walls				56°03′44″N 3°13′37″W	Category B	22835	Upload Photo
93 And 93A Kinghorn Road With Boundary Walls				56°03′45″N 3°13′33″W	Category B	22840	Upload Photo
134 Kinghorn Road With Boundary Walls				56°03′50″N 3°13′13″W	Category C(S)	22847	Upload Photo
Kinghorn Road, Cemetery Lodge, Hearse House, Boundary Walls, Gatepiers, Railings And Gravestones				56°03′54″N 3°12′47″W	Category C(S)	22849	Upload Photo
25-31 (Odd Nos) Craigkennochie Terrace With Boundary Walls				56°03′46″N 3°13′38″W	Category C(S)	22759	Upload Photo
45-49 (Odd Nos) Craigkennochie Terrace With Boundary Walls And Railings				56°03′47″N 3°13′34″W	Category C(S)	22763	Upload Photo
Carron Harbour				56°03′34″N 3°15′27″W	Category B	3686	Upload Photo
Grange Road, Grange Distillery Cottage With Boundary Walls				56°03′59″N 3°14′38″W	Category B	3689	Upload Photo
Aberdour Road, Bendameer Cottage				56°03′38″N 3°15′37″W	Category B	3691	Upload Photo
Kirkton Road, St Serf's Kirk, With Graveyard, Boundary Walls, Gatepiers And Gates				56°03′50″N 3°14′16″W	Category B	22862	Upload Photo
Lammerlaws Road, Victoria Cottage With Boundary And Terrace Walls And Pier				56°03′29″N 3°13′26″W	Category C(S)	22864	Upload Photo
25, 26 And 27 Somerville Square				56°03′30″N 3°14′05″W	Category B	22878	Upload Photo
Ferguson Place, Burntisland Primary School With Janitor's House, Gateway, Gatepiers, Boundary Walls And Railings				56°03′50″N 3°13′42″W	Category B	22780	Upload Photo
Harbour Place, Railway Bridge				56°03′29″N 3°14′11″W	Category C(S)	22788	Upload another image
177-181 (Odd Nos) High Street				56°03′34″N 3°14′00″W	Category C(S)	22798	Upload Photo
186 And 188 High Street				56°03′34″N 3°13′54″W	Category C(S)	22817	Upload Photo
High Street, Town Hall				56°03′33″N 3°14′03″W	Category B	22820	Upload another image
7, 7A And 9 Kinghorn Road With Boundary Wall				56°03′39″N 3°13′47″W	Category C(S)	22823	Upload Photo
13 Kinghorn Road With Boundary Walls				56°03′39″N 3°13′47″W	Category C(S)	22824	Upload Photo
69 Kinghorn Road, Inchview Hotel With Boundary Walls				56°03′44″N 3°13′37″W	Category B	22836	Upload Photo
85 Kinghorn Road, Craigholm With Boundary Walls				56°03′45″N 3°13′35″W	Category B	22837	Upload Photo
139 Aberdour Road, Colinswell House With Gatepiers, Gates, Boundary Walls And Railings				56°03′44″N 3°15′05″W	Category B	22751	Upload Photo
Grange Road, Grange Distillery, Main Gateway, Gates, Railings And Boundary Walls				56°03′58″N 3°14′33″W	Category B	6670	Upload Photo
Grange Road, Grange Distillery, Warehouse				56°03′57″N 3°14′31″W	Category B	6672	Upload Photo
Starleybank With Terrace, Boundary Walls And Gatepiers				56°03′37″N 3°15′42″W	Category C(S)	6678	Upload Photo
Dunearn Cottage With Boundary Walls And Gatepiers				56°04′15″N 3°15′52″W	Category C(S)	3687	Upload Photo
Rossend Castle, Gazebo				56°03′31″N 3°14′22″W	Category C(S)	22873	Upload Photo
28 And 29 Somerville Square				56°03′30″N 3°14′04″W	Category B	22879	Upload Photo
30-33 (Inclusive Nos) Somerville Square				56°03′31″N 3°14′02″W	Category B	22880	Upload Photo
East Leven Street, Burntisland Parish Church Graveyard, Walls And Gravestones				56°03′28″N 3°13′56″W	Category B	22778	Upload Photo
Forth Place Station House				56°03′25″N 3°14′05″W	Category B	22783	Upload Photo
183 High Street				56°03′34″N 3°14′00″W	Category C(S)	22799	Upload Photo
207 High Street Royal Bank Of Scotland				56°03′35″N 3°13′57″W	Category B	22802	Upload Photo
132 Kinghorn Road With Boundary Wall				56°03′50″N 3°13′14″W	Category C(S)	22846	Upload Photo
5 And 7 East Leven Street With Boundary Wall				56°03′30″N 3°13′56″W	Category C(S)	22773	Upload Photo
Aberdour Road, Bendameer House With Conservatory, Terrace Walls, Boundary Walls And Gatepiers				56°03′40″N 3°15′39″W	Category B	3692	Upload Photo

== Key ==
The scheme for classifying buildings in Scotland is:

- Category A: "buildings of national or international importance, either architectural or historic; or fine, little-altered examples of some particular period, style or building type."
- Category B: "buildings of regional or more than local importance; or major examples of some particular period, style or building type, which may have been altered."
- Category C: "buildings of local importance; lesser examples of any period, style, or building type, as originally constructed or moderately altered; and simple traditional buildings which group well with other listed buildings."

In March 2016 there were 47,288 listed buildings in Scotland. Of these, 8% were Category A, and 50% were Category B, with the remaining 42% being Category C.

== See also ==
- List of listed buildings in Fife
