= HMS Loch Glendhu =

Frigate of the Royal Navy

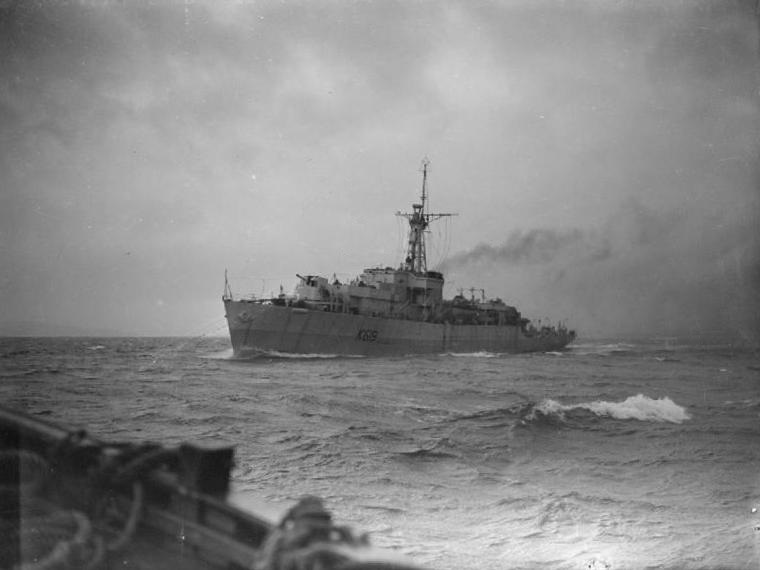
- Loch Glendhu in February 1945

History

United Kingdom
- Name: HMS Loch Glendhu
- Namesake: Loch Glendhu
- Ordered: 2 February 1943
- Builder: Burntisland Shipbuilding Company
- Laid down: 29 May 1944
- Launched: 18 October 1944
- Commissioned: 23 February 1945
- Identification: Pennant number K619
- Fate: Scrapped November 1957

General characteristics
- Class & type: Loch-class frigate
- Displacement: 1,435 long tons (1,458 t)
- Length: 307 ft 9 in (93.8 m)
- Beam: 38 ft 9 in (11.8 m)
- Draught: 8 ft 9 in (2.7 m)
- Installed power: 2 Admiralty 3-drum boilers; 5,500 ihp (4,100 kW) (steam engines) or; 6,500 shp (4,800 kW) (steam turbines)
- Propulsion: 2 shafts; 2 × vertical triple-expansion steam engines or; 2 × Parsons steam turbines
- Speed: 20 knots (37 km/h; 23 mph)
- Range: 9,500 nmi (17,600 km; 10,900 mi) at 12 knots (22 km/h; 14 mph)
- Complement: 114
- Sensors & processing systems: Types 144 and 147B ASDIC; Type 277 surface-search radar
- Armament: 1 × single QF 4-inch Mark V; 1 × quadruple QF 2-pounder; 2 × single Bofors AA guns; 2–8 × single 20 mm Oerlikon AA guns; 2 × Squid triple-barrelled anti-submarine mortars; 1 rail and 2 throwers for 15 depth charges

HMS Loch Glendhu was a Royal Navy Loch-class frigate named after Loch Glendhu in Scotland. She was built at the Burntisland Shipbuilding Company's shipyard in Burntisland, Fife, Scotland in 1944.

== Publications ==
- Boniface, Patrick (2013). Loch Class Frigates. Maritime Books. ISBN 978-1-904459-54-5.
- Colledge, J. J.; Warlow, Ben (2006) [1969]. Ships of the Royal Navy: The Complete Record of All Fighting Ships of the Royal Navy from the 15th Century to the Present (3rd Rev ed.). London: Chatham Publishing. ISBN 978-1-86176-281-8. OCLC 67375475.
