= Amos Ayre =

British Shipbuilder

Ayre in January 1943.

Sir Amos Lowrey Ayre KBE (23 July 1885 – 13 January 1952) was a British shipbuilder and co-founder of the Burntisland Shipbuilding Company in 1918. He held senior posts related to shipping during both world wars.

Born at South Shields, Ayre grew up surrounded by shipbuilding and seafaring activity. He served an apprenticeship as a draughtsman with Wood, Skinner and Co in Newcastle-on-Tyne and graduated from Armstrong College, Newcastle in 1904. He went on to hold posts in shipyards at Belfast and Dublin, where he came to hold status and responsibility. In 1909 he accepted the position of Manager at the Employment Exchange lately opened at Govan, outside Glasgow. He was in charge of fleet coaling operations on the River Forth during the First World War, and promoted to the post of Admiralty District Director for shipyard labour in Scotland. He and his brother, Sir Wilfrid Ayre, founded the Burntisland Shipbuilding Company at Fife. In 1936, in recognition of his eminence in public service, Ayre was offered the position of Chairman of the Shipbuilding Conference, effectively placing him in charge of the entire industry. He was made Knight Bachelor in 1937 and Knight Commander of the Order of the British Empire (KBE) in 1943. From 1939 to 1944, he was Director of Merchant Shipbuilding.

== Bibliography ==
- Ayre, Amos Lowrey (1921). The theory and design of British shipbuilding. T. Reed.
