= Burntisland Parish Church =

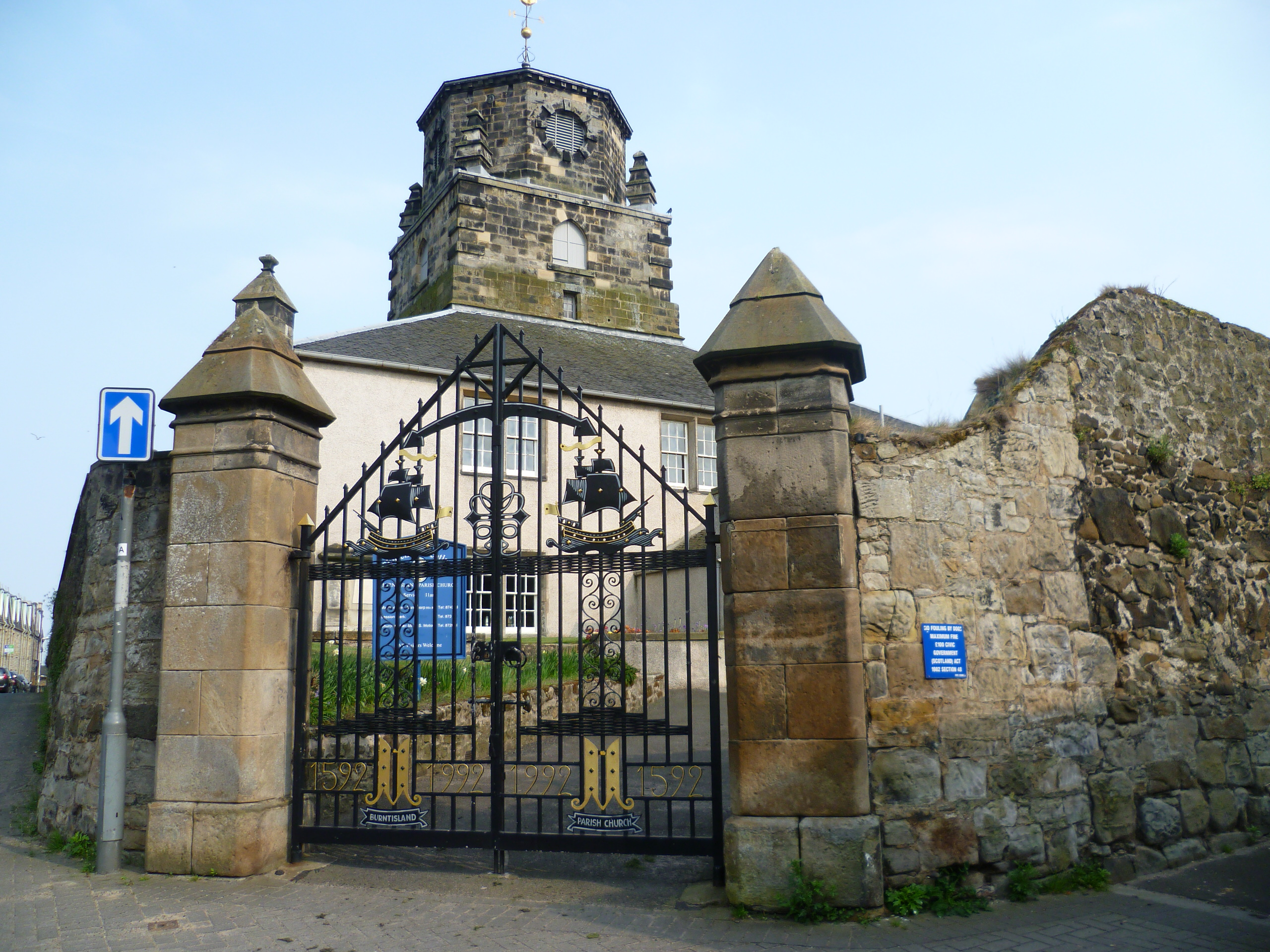
- Burntisland Parish Church
- 56.05804°N 3.23243°W
- Location: Burntisland
- Country: Scotland
- Denomination: Church of Scotland
- Website: burntislandparishchurch.org

History
- Founded: 1592; 434 years ago

Architecture
- Heritage designation: Category A listed building
- Completed: 1595; 431 years ago

Burntisland Parish Church (also known as St Columba's, Burntisland) is a church building in the Fife burgh of Burntisland, constructed for the Church of Scotland in 1592. It is historically important as one of the first churches built in Scotland after the Reformation, with a highly distinctive and apparently original square plan. It is Category A listed for its architectural and historical importance.

In 1601 the church was the location of a meeting of the General Assembly of the Church of Scotland which proposed to King James VI of Scotland that they work on a new Bible translation. When James became King James I of England he was able to devote resources to the production of what would ultimately become the King James Version.

== History ==
The port of Burntisland had grown during the 16th century and was made a royal burgh in 1568; due to this growth and increased sense of civic pride, the townspeople decided to build a new church. This replaced an earlier building at Kirkton, a mile to the north of Burntisland.

The Church of Scotland intend to dispose of the building in 2027 and alternative ownership and uses are being explored by the local community.

== Architecture ==
The building is notable for its square design: the interior is 18m square with four arched piers reaching in diagonally from the corners to form a 6m square in the centre. Various models for it have been suggested, mainly in the Low Countries, but no candidate has been found to predate it, and it is therefore probably an original Scottish design.

It incorporates a gallery with a separate exit, for sailors to leave the service when the timing of the tide dictated that it was time to sail.

The tower was rebuilt by Samuel Neilson in 1748. Significant renovations were carried out by David Vertue in 1822; he enlarged the windows and removed many of the old pews.

The architect Malcolm Fraser described its distinctive design as "a radical representation of democracy and the freedom of man to communicate directly with God." Henry Kerr suggests symbolism in its structure: the church is built high up on a rock, and its four walls lean in on the tower, which represents the "strength and safety" of the Church.

== Interior decoration ==
It is decorated inside with carved wooden panels, many of which relate to the town's maritime history, depicting ships, shipowners, and nautical trades. As well as sailors, there were also areas for the guilds of schoolmasters, tailors, hammermen, maltsters, and bakers. A painted panel in the west gallery from 1930 commemorates the 800th anniversary of the old church at Kirkton.

The 1606 Magistrate's Pew (formerly known as the Burntisland Castle Pew) in the northeast corner was built for Robert Melville of Rossend. In 1907 Robert Rowand Anderson supervised renovation of this and other parts of the interior. The bell was cast by Isobel Meikle in 1708. The organ was paid for by Fife-born industrialist Andrew Carnegie. The church was extensively renovated in the 1990s.
