= Loch Killin =

- Location within Highland
- Location: Monadhliath Mountains, Highland, Scotland
- Coordinates: 57.163°N 4.436°W
- Type: freshwater loch
- Basin countries: United Kingdom

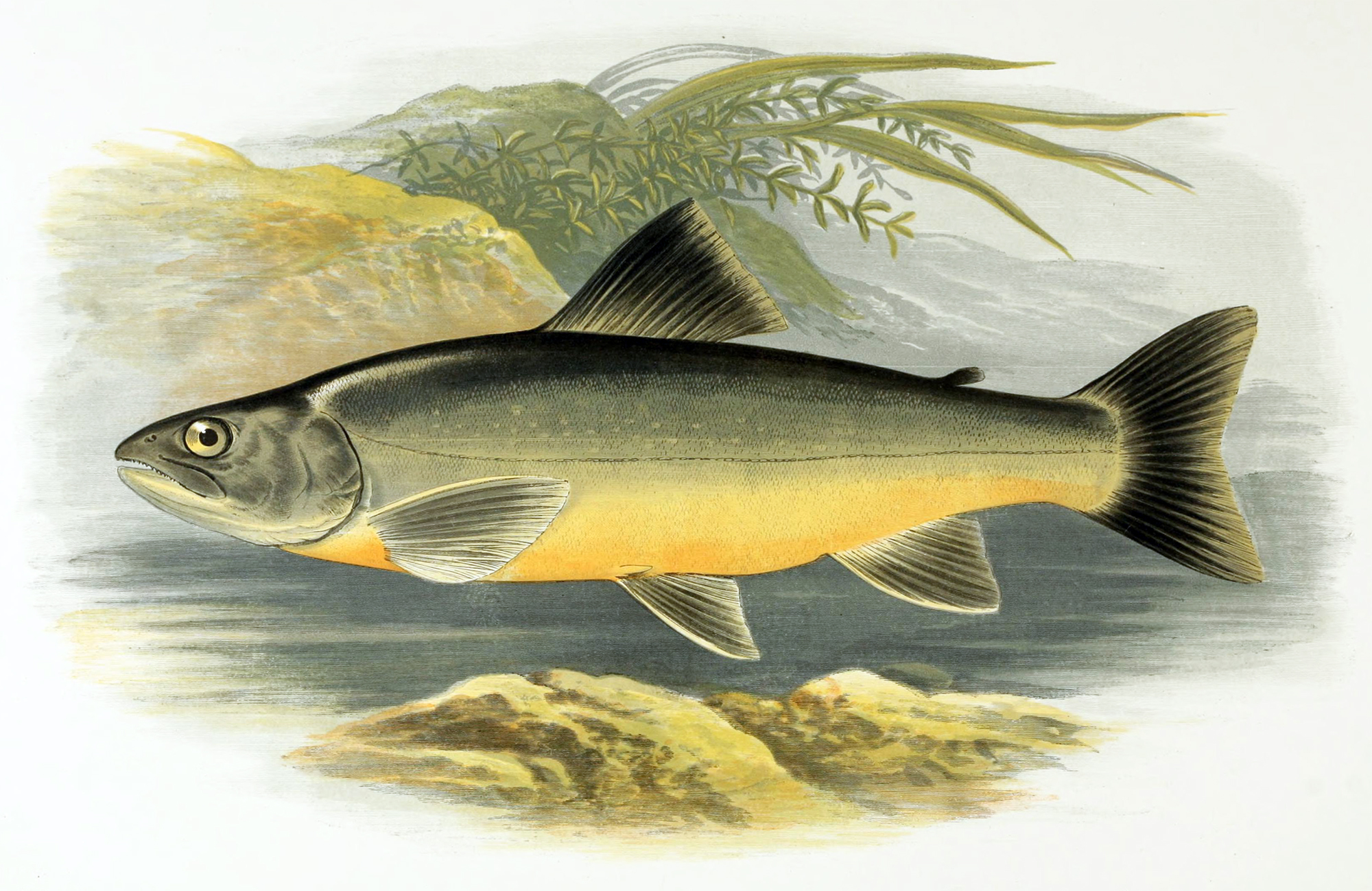
Haddy charr

Loch Killin is a small freshwater loch in the Monadhliath Mountains, in Highland, Scotland, United Kingdom.

== Geography ==
The loch is about 1.2 miles (1.9 km) long, and is one of numerous small lochs close to the southern end of Loch Ness, the southernmost point of which lies nine miles to the west. The nearest settlement is Whitebridge, which is approximately 5 miles (8.0 km) to the north-west of the loch and which features a Jacobite era bridge built by George Wade in 1732. This includes the neighbouring hamlet and abandoned former township of Easter Drummond. The Loch is part of a wider hydroelectricity scheme at Garrogie. There are a couple of hunting lodges in proximity to the lodge, specifically Garrogie lodge and Killin lodge, as well as several tracks through the valleys towards a wind farm in the Grampian Mountains.

== Ecology ==
The waters of Loch Killin are home to the Haddy charr (Salvelinus killinensis), a species of char named after this loch. It is endemic to this lake as well as Loch Doine, and possibly Loch Builg.

== Association ==
The Royal Navy frigate HMS Loch Killin was named after the loch.
