= Wilfrid Ayre =

Sir Wilfrid Ayre (12 April 1890 – 11 August 1971) was a British shipbuilder and banker. With his brother Sir Amos Ayre, he co-founded the Burntisland Shipbuilding Company in 1918.

He was knighted in 1945.
