= Burntisland =

Coordinates: 56°03′34″N 03°13′57″W

Burntisland: Scottish Gaelic: An t-Eilean Loisgte; Scots: Burntisland, Bruntisland
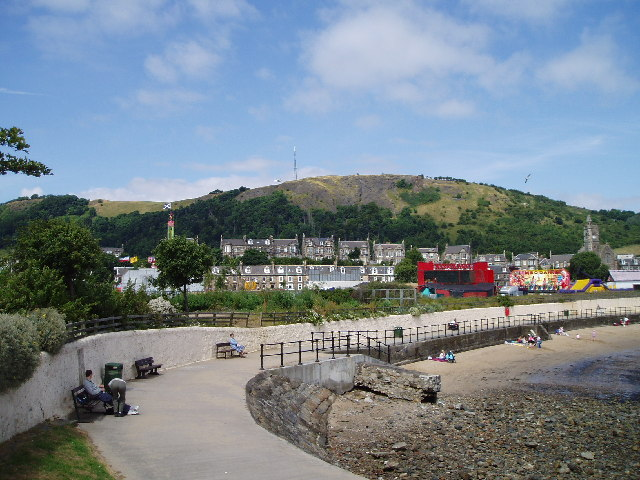
- A view across Burntisland

- Location within Fife
- Population: 6,630 (2020)
- OS grid reference: NT233859
  - Edinburgh: 7.5 mi (12.1 km)
  - London: 339 mi (546 km)
- Council area: Fife
- Lieutenancy area: Fife
- Country: Scotland
- Sovereign state: United Kingdom
- Post town: BURNTISLAND
- Postcode district: KY3
- Dialling code: 01592
- Police: Scotland
- Fire: Scottish
- Ambulance: Scottish
- UK Parliament: Cowdenbeath and Kirkcaldy
- Scottish Parliament: Kirkcaldy

Burntisland (/bɜːrntˈaɪlənd/, Scots: Bruntisland) is a former Royal burgh and parish in Fife, Scotland, on the northern shore of the Firth of Forth. It was previously known as Wester Kinghorn or Little Kinghorn. The town has a population of 6,269 (2011) 6,254 (2022).

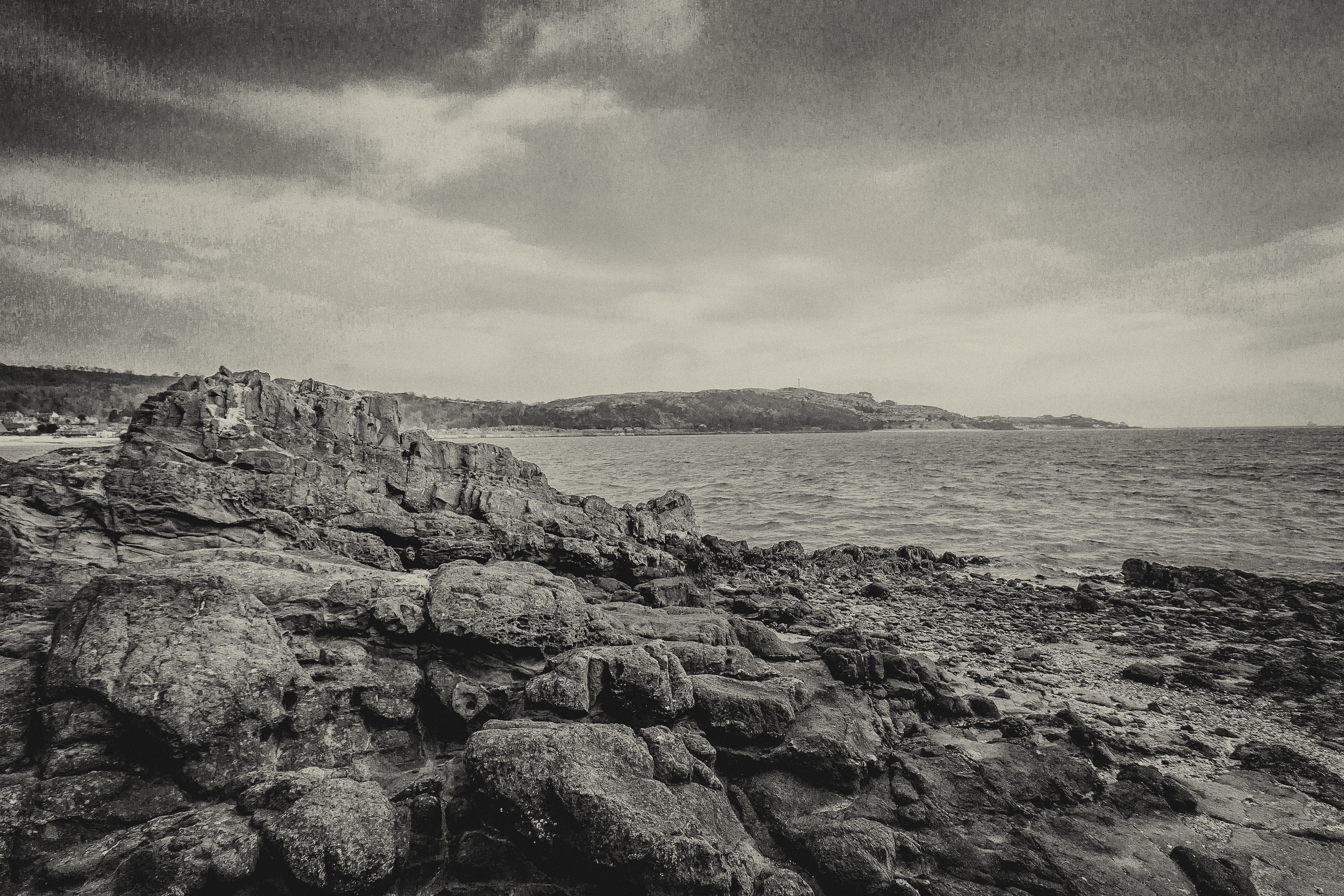
Burntisland coastal image

Burntisland is known locally for its award-winning sandy beach, the 15th-century Rossend Castle, as well as the traditional summer fair and Highland games day. To the north of the town there is a hill called the Binn, which is a landmark of the Fife coastline; it is a volcanic plug, and rises 193 metres (632 ft) above sea level.

== History ==
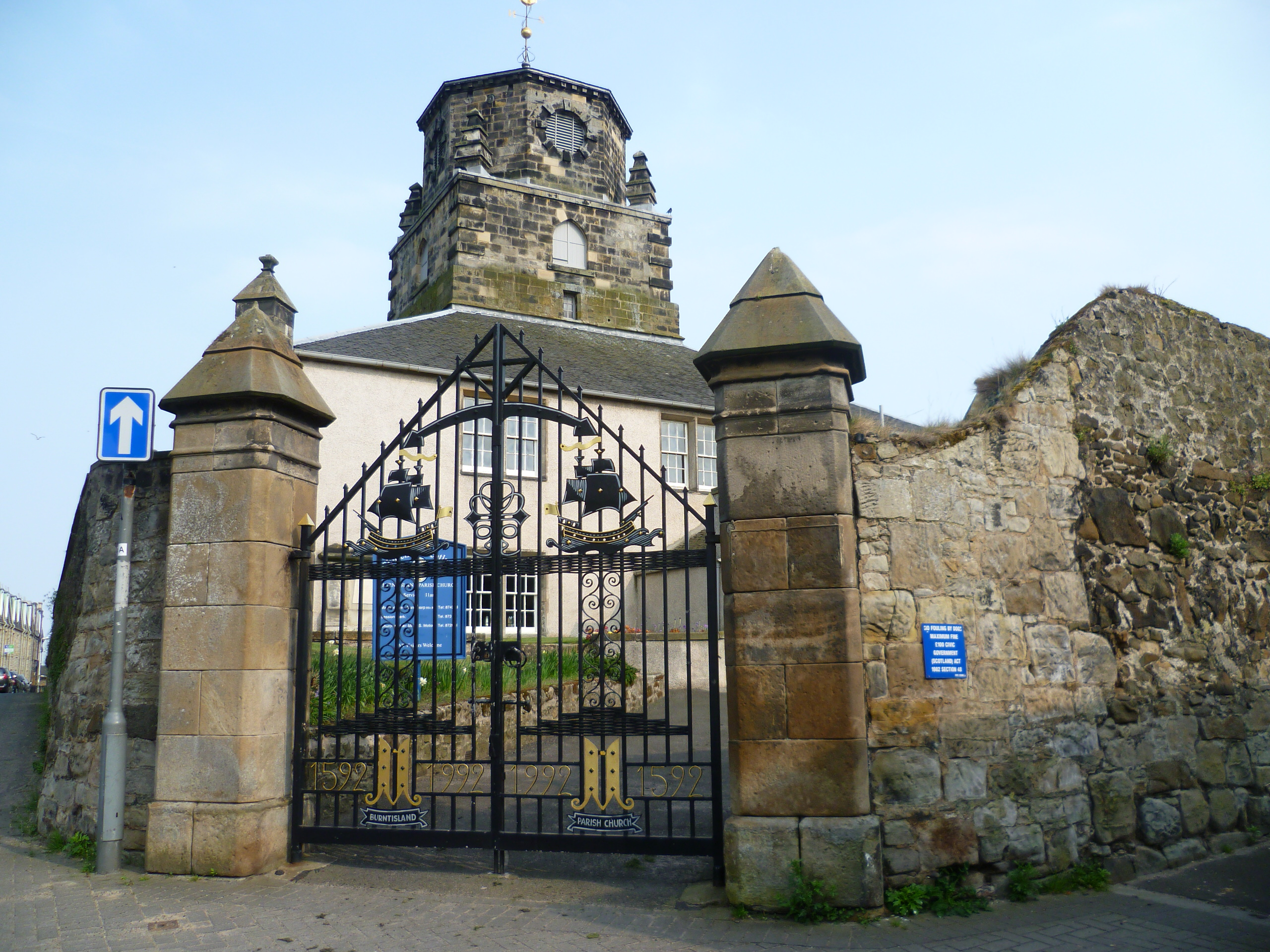
Burntisland Parish Kirk

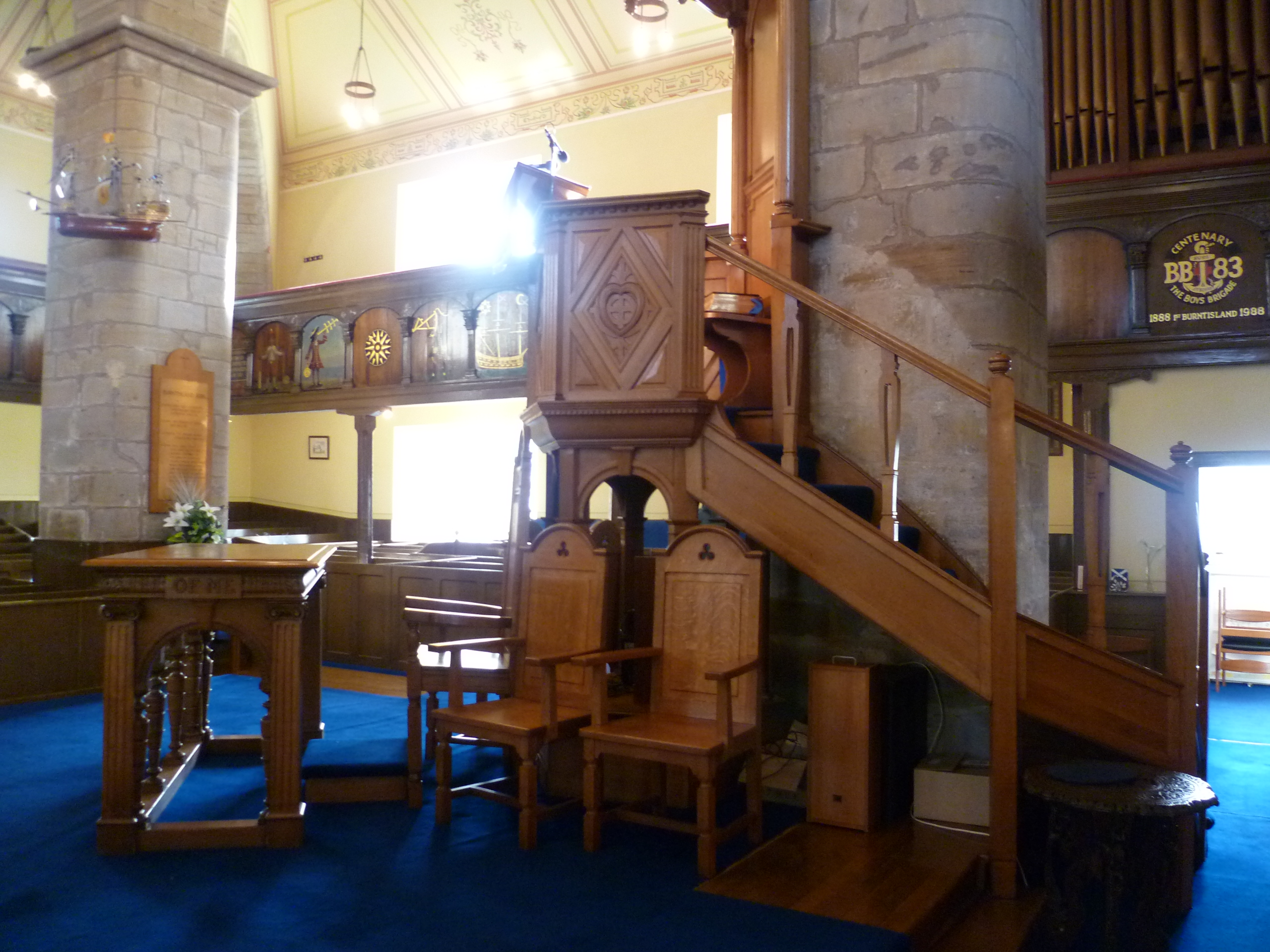
The Kirk's plan and design are unique in Scotland

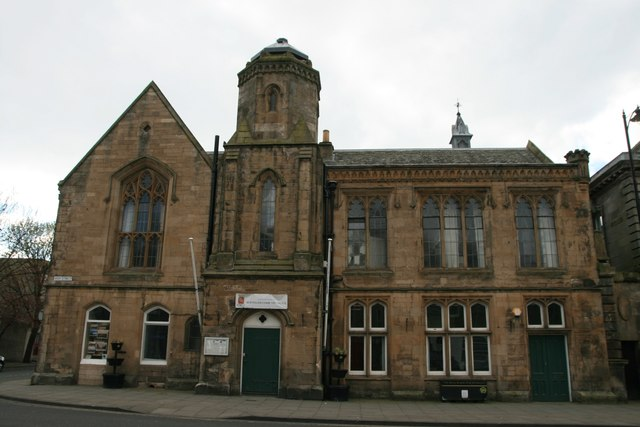
Burntisland Burgh Chambers

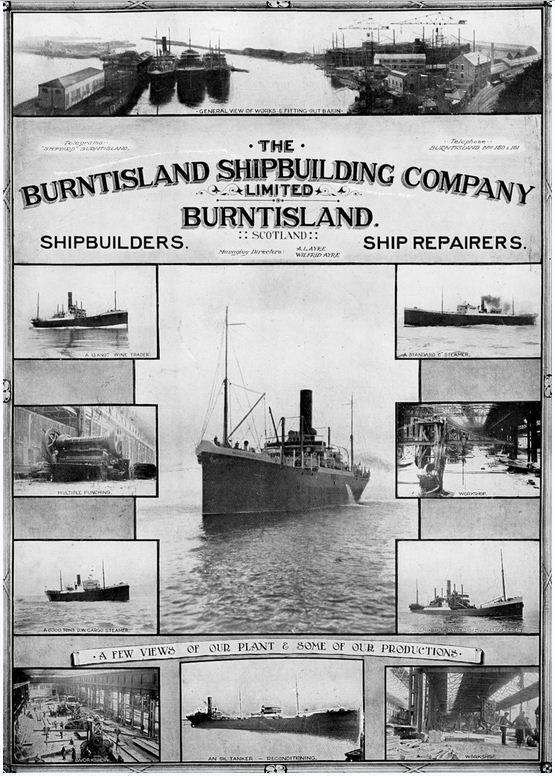

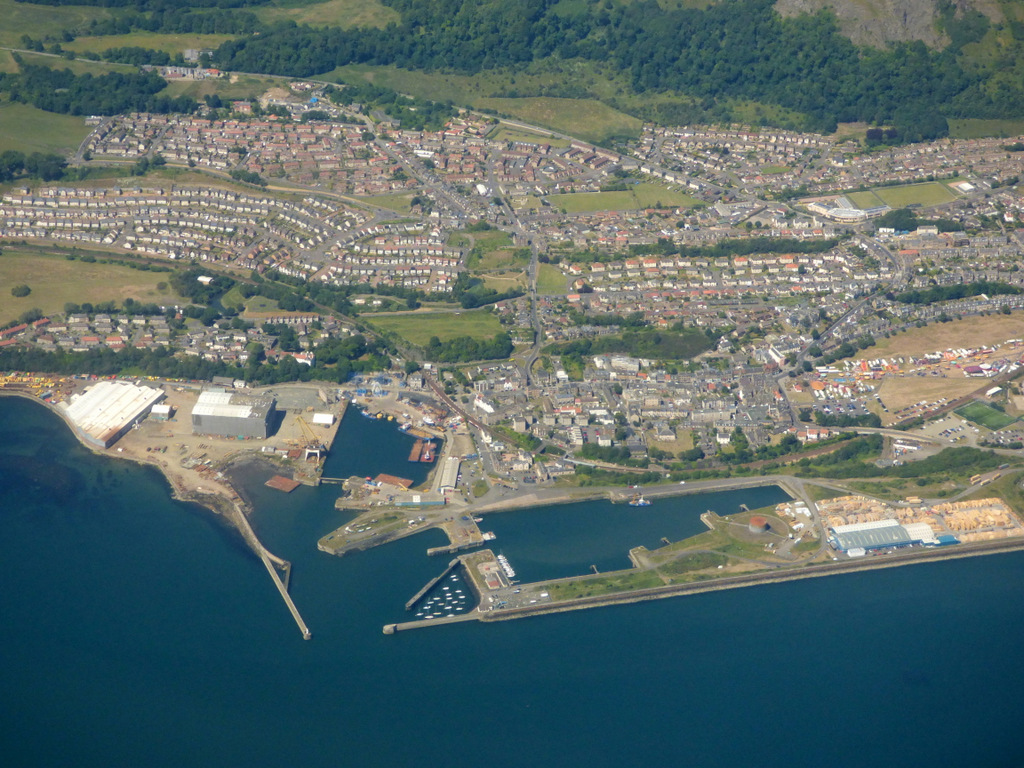
Burntisland docks from the air

Early evidence of human activity in this area has been found in rock carvings on the Binn, thought to be about 4,000 years old. The Roman commander Agricola may have used the natural harbour and set up camp at the nearby Dunearn Hill in AD 83.

The earliest historical record of the town was in the 12th century, when the monks of Dunfermline Abbey owned the harbour and neighbouring lands. The settlement was known as Wester Kinghorn or Little Kinghorn and developed as a fishing hamlet to provide food for the inhabitants of Rossend Castle. The harbour was then sold to James V by the abbots of Dunfermline Abbey in exchange for a parcel of land. The land was granted royal burgh status by James V in 1541. When the status was confirmed in 1586, the settlement gained independence from the barony of Kinghorn and was renamed Burntisland, possibly a nickname from the burning of fishermens' huts on an islet now incorporated into the docks. However, Ross (2007) considers this explanation of the town's name "implausible" and proposes the origin Burnet's Land after a local personal name.

Substantial remains of the original parish church, built in the late 12th century, survive in a churchyard to the north of the old town on Church Street. The building of a town wall to both north and east in the post-Flodden world of late 16th century Scotland, which placed the old church outwith the protective wall, was one of the several reasons that a new church was built in 1592: Burntisland Parish Church, also known as St Columba's. This was the first new parish church built in Scotland after the Reformation. It is a unique shape, square with a central tower upheld on pillars, and lined all round with galleries, to allow the greatest number of people to be reached by the minister's words during the service. The church contains some carved wooden panels.

In 1601, King James VI chose the town as an alternative site for the General Assembly of the Church of Scotland. This was when a new translation of the Bible was first discussed, a project which James brought to fruition a decade later in the King James Bible.

The town was part of the lands of Dunfermline belonging to Anne of Denmark. In April 1615 there was a riot in broad daylight against one of her legal officers by a crowd of over a hundred women who took his letters and threw stones at him. The rioters were "of the bangster Amasone kind" led by the wife of the Baillie of Burntisland according to the Chancellor Alexander Seton, 1st Earl of Dunfermline, who supposed the women were acting at the instigation of the townsmen including the minister Mr William Watson.

Burntisland developed as a seaport, being second only to Leith in the Firth of Forth, and shipbuilding became an important industry in the town. James V improved the harbour in 1540 and named it "Our Lady Port". In 1544 it was defended by three artillery blockhouses. An English report mentions a dock at Burntisland called the Newhaven and says a pier and the three blockhouses were to the west, at "Mill Dame". During the war of the Rough Wooing in 1548 the English commander Edward Clinton planned to reconstruct the harbour and pier and their defences, employing a military engineer. In 1559, the town came under French occupation when Scottish Protestant leaders opposed the Catholic Mary of Guise. The occupation ended with the arrival of an English fleet in 1560, prompting the occupiers to retreat by land, back to Leith. The harbour at this time was dry at low-tide and ships lay in the "ooze" or mud.

In 1622 a leaking Spanish ship entered the harbour and promptly sank. The crew said they were whalers, and they had whaling equipment, but the town baillies were suspicious and imprisoned the officers in the tolbooth and put the rest under house arrest under suspicion of piracy. The lawyer Thomas Hamilton arranged their release, arguing they had committed no crime and there was peace with Spain at the time. The town also became a major embarkation point for Scottish soldiers on their way to fight in the Thirty Years War, in October 1627 the Burgh Council complained to the Scottish Privy Council about the conduct of these troops. In 1633 a barge, the Blessing of Burntisland, carrying Charles I and his entourage's baggage from Burntisland to Leith sank with the loss of Charles' treasure.

In 1638, the town like much of the country rallied behind the cause of the National Covenant in the Wars of the Three Kingdoms. The town with its good harbour became a magazine and supply depot for the Army of the Covenant.

Burntisland was held by the Jacobite army for over two months during the rising known as the Fifteen. The Jacobites first of all raided the port on 2 October 1715, capturing several hundred weapons, then occupied it on 9 October.

In September 1844 a new pier was completed to form a ferry link to the new harbour at Granton, Edinburgh. It was built by local builder Peter Penny (1803-1866). Burntisland Burgh Chambers was designed by John Henderson and completed in 1846.

Burntisland became an important port for the local herring and coal industries, and in 1847 the Edinburgh and Northern Railway opened from Burntisland north to Lindores and Cupar. By 1850 the world's first roll-on/roll-off rail ferry service was crossing the Firth of Forth between Burntisland and Granton, enabling goods wagons to travel between Edinburgh and Dundee without the need for unloading and re-loading at the ferries. (Passengers however had to disembark and use separate passenger ferries). This operated until 1890 when the Forth Bridge opened.

The Burntisland Shipbuilding Company at Burntisland West Dock was founded in 1918 as an emergency shipyard for the First World War, specialising in cargo ships.

In 1929 the yard introduced the "Burntisland Economy" steamship, which was designed to maximise fuel economy. The popularity of this design helped the yard to survive the Great Depression. In the Second World War the yard continued to concentrate on merchant ships but also built three Loch class frigates: HMS Loch Killin (K391), HMS Loch Fyne (K429) and HMS Loch Glendhu (K619). By 1961 the shipyard had 1,000 workers but in 1968 the company got into financial difficulties. The shipyard closed in 1969 and was sold to Robb Caledon of Leith.

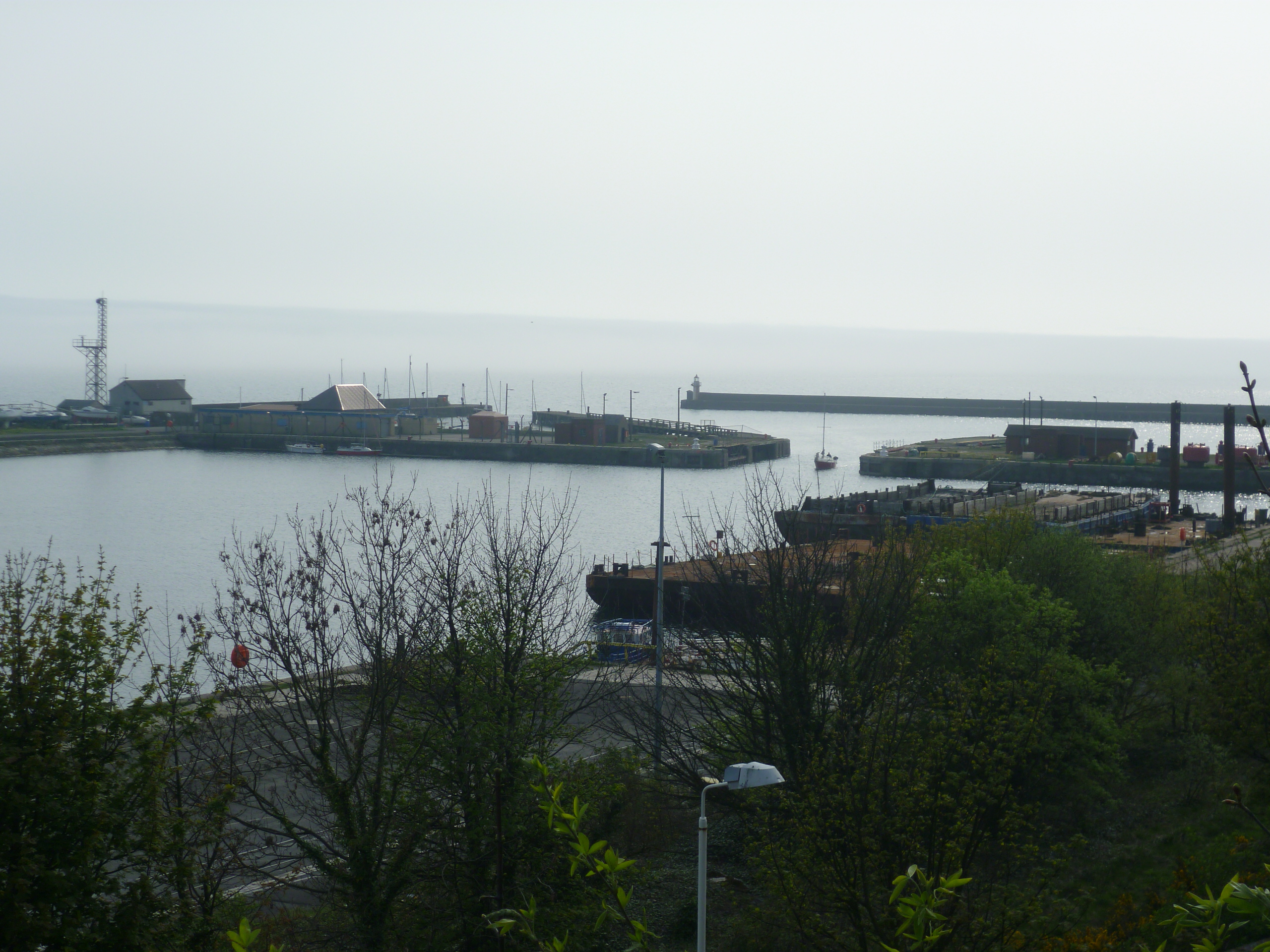
Burntisland Docks, 2011

Robb Caledon eventually secured orders to for the yard to build modules for the North Sea oil and natural gas industry, and formed its Burntisland Engineering Fabricators (BEF) subsidiary to manage this work. Towards the end of the 1970s orders declined, in 1978 Robb Caledon was nationalised as part of British Shipbuilders and in 1979 Burntisland yard was closed. In 1990 under new owners Burntisland West Dock resumed the production of major offshore oil and gas fabrications. Industry related to North Sea oil remains important for the town. In 2001 a management buyout took over the yard as Burntisland Fabrications or BiFab. BiFab describes itself as the only major fabricator continuing in production in Scotland since 2005.

A plant for the refining of alumina was opened by Alcan early in the 20th century and closed in 2002, the land now used for housing.

== Church ==
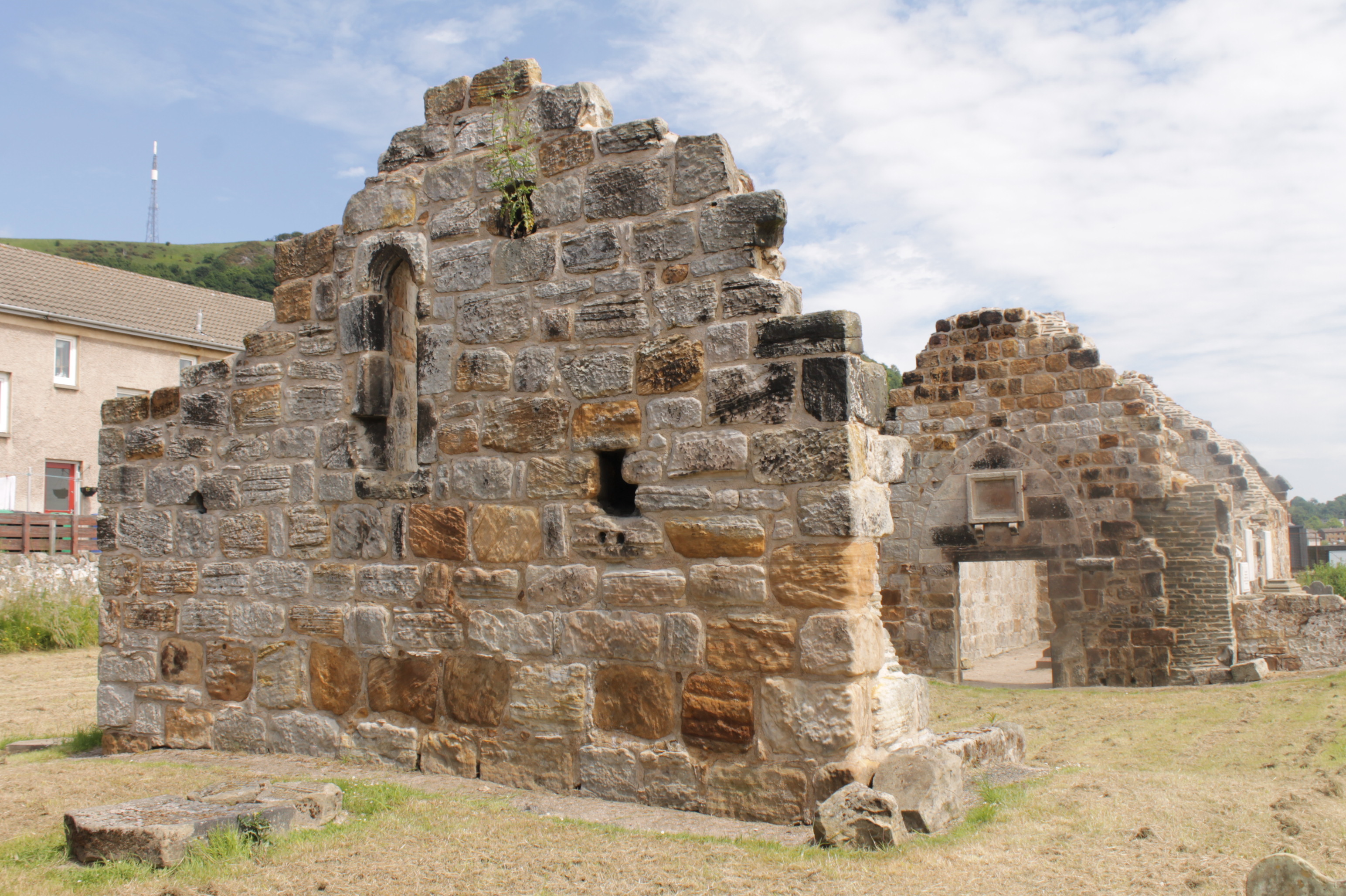
Old Kirkton church ruins, Burntisland

The pre-Reformation church (known as Kirkton church) lies on Church Street and served until 1592, at which point it was abandoned. It was ruinous by 1700 but was used for burials until the mid-20th century. The main body of the church serves as a burial vault to the local family Aytoun (Ayton) of Grange.

A new church, Burntisland Parish Church, was built in 1592 by a Dutch architect dedicated to St Columba on a small hill overlooking the sea. In 1601 it was the meeting place of the General Assembly of the Church of Scotland due to an outbreak of plague in the usual venue in Edinburgh. Many attendees would have come by sea. The Assembly was attended by King James VI. It is said that it was at this Assembly that the King requested that a new version of the Bible be created: leading to the creation of the 1611 authorised King James Bible, which (after the Union of Crowns in 1606 represented both England and Scotland but was requested whilst the King was solely King of Scotland.

Ministers of the church in sequence were: John Brown (1567–1589); Andrew Lamb (1593–1596); William Symson (1597–1601); William Watson (1601–1616); John Michaelson (1616–1640, refused to sign the National Covenant); Andrew Lesly (1640–1643); John Smith (1643–1648); George Nairne (1649–1662, imprisoned); Harry Malcolm (1663); William Livingston (1663–1672, imprisoned); George Clerk of Crowley (1672–1688, suicide); George Johnston (1688–1691); James Pitcairn (c. 1691); James Inglis (1692–1699); John Cleghorn (1701–1711); Henry Robin (1714–1718, left due to adultery); James Thomson (1719–1740, moved to Antiburgher Church); Robert Spears (1743–1773); James Wemyss (1779–1820); Charles Watson (1820–1837), father of Robert Boog Watson and Patrick Heron Watson; John Aikman Wallace (1827–1833); David Couper (1834–1843, moved to Free Church); Robert William Fraser (1843–1844); James MacKintosh (1844–1848); John Robin (1849–1873); James Edgar Hill (1873–1877); Robert James Cameron (1877–1879); John MacAlister Thomson (1879–1880, died in pulpit); Joseph Sage Finlayson (1880–1909); John Rogan (1910–?).

== Highland games ==
Burntisland is home to the second oldest highland games in the world starting in 1652. The Games take place on the third Monday of July, the start of the Fife/Glasgow fair fortnight, and a local market and summer fairground takes place on the same day.

== Sport and recreation ==
Burntisland Shipyard is the town's senior football club, currently competing in the East of Scotland League Second Division – the seventh tier of Scottish football.

The town is home to the eleventh-oldest golf club in the world – Burntisland Golf Club (the 'Old Club', as it is known among its members). Although it is not a course-owning club, its competitions are held over on the local course now run by Burntisland Golf House Club at Dodhead.

The Beacon Leisure Centre features a 25-metre swimming pool with a wave machine and flumes, as well as gym facilities. Opened in 1997, this replaced an open-air bathing pool which closed in 1979.

One of Scotland's Great Trails, the 187 km Fife Coastal Path, passes through the town. From Aberdour the route follows the railway line, goes along the High Street, and then heads towards Kinghorn via the beach promenade and A921 road. At low tide it is possible to walk from the beach across the sands to Pettycur before rejoining the route in Kinghorn.

== Education ==
The town currently has one school, Burntisland Primary School, housed in a modern building which opened in August 2014 on the Toll Park. The school roll is around 690, which includes 160 nursery pupils. The adjacent nursery building across the road continues to be used. At its previous site on Ferguson Place the school first opened in 1876, and by 2000 was spread across five separate buildings.

The majority of secondary school pupils attend Balwearie High School in nearby Kirkcaldy. Catholic pupils travel to St Marie's Primary School or St Andrews High School, also in Kirkcaldy.

== Burntisland Viaduct ==
Immediately to the west of Burntisland railway station lies the 9-span viaduct forming a significant feature in the harbour area of the town. Built in 1888 to carry the main railway line from Edinburgh to Dundee, it is now a Category C Listed structure, being a rare example of a surviving Town truss.

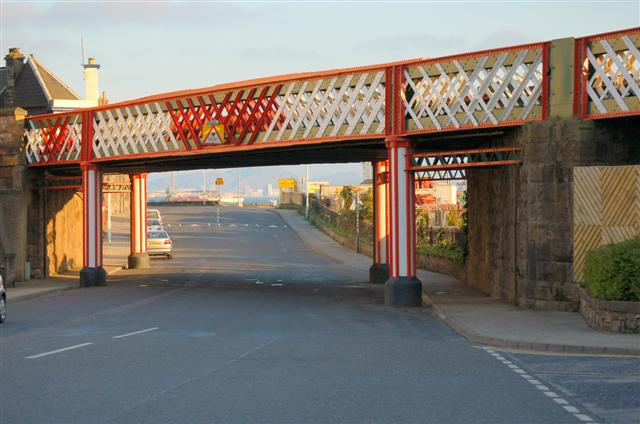
The easternmost spans of Burntisland Viaduct

== Attractions ==
From May to August the annual summer funfair, known as the Shows, comes to town and there is also the second oldest highland games in the world, held on the third Monday every July.

The Burntisland and District Pipe Band compete in Grade 3B after being promoted from Grade 4B after a successful 2014 season. The band are 2014 British, U.K and European and World Champions. The band is known throughout for its development with children in the local area, creating players that now compete in Grade 1.

A free live music festival, Live on the Links, also takes place annually during the summer. First held in 1983 at the bandstand on the Links, it now runs for the whole weekend at different venues in the town on the second weekend in August.

== Transport ==
The A921 coast road runs through the town and connects to the M90 motorway at Inverkeithing in the west and the A92 at Kirkcaldy in the east. The A909 travels inland towards the A92 at Cowdenbeath and the M90 at Kelty.

Burntisland railway station is on the Fife Circle Line and provides direct links with Kirkcaldy to the north and Edinburgh to the south. However, only the southbound platform provides step-free access.

The town is also served by Stagecoach bus service 7, which runs between Dunfermline in the west and Leven (via Kirkcaldy) in the east. The circular B1 service covers most areas of the town. The X58 service now runs through Burntisland at night as it debuted August 2026.

== Town twinning ==
Burntisland has been twinned with Flekkefjord Municipality, Norway since 1946.

== Notable residents ==
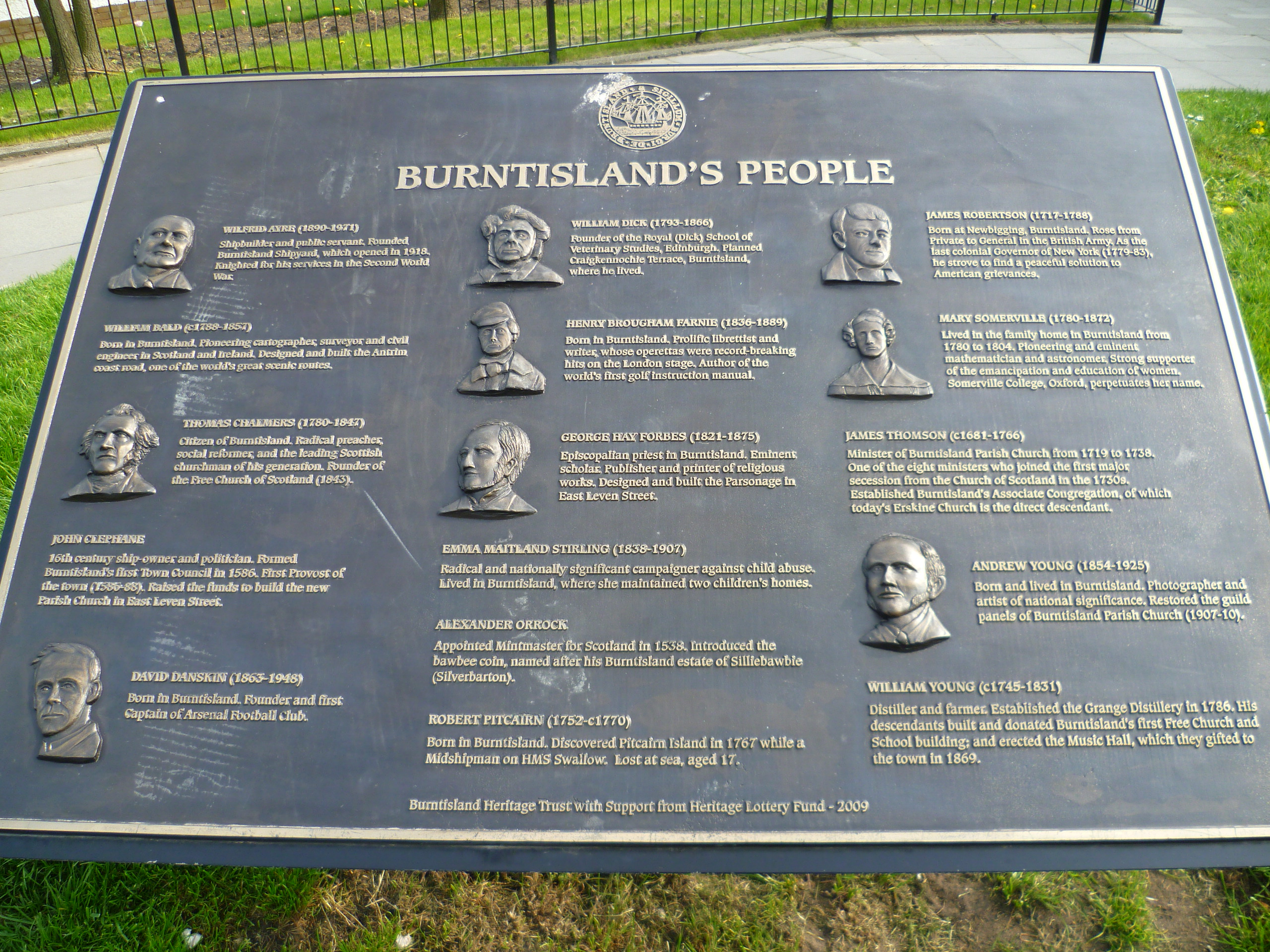
Burntisland's people information board at The Links

- David Danskin, mechanical engineer, and first captain of Arsenal football club.
- Aileen Paterson, writer and illustrator
- Robert Pitcairn, midshipman in the Royal Navy, who first spotted Pitcairn Island in the Pacific Ocean when aged 15
- Anneila Sargent, astronomer
- Mary Somerville, science writer and polymath after whom Somerville College, Oxford is named
- Darrell Sweet, drummer with the band Nazareth
- Robert Boog Watson, zoologist and minister
- Patrick Heron Watson, surgeon, brother of above
- Edward Wilson, cricketer and badminton player

== See also ==
- Burntisland (Parliament of Scotland constituency)
- Craigkelly transmitting station
- List of places in Fife
- Pitsligo Press, founded in Burntisland by George Hay Forbes
