= HMS Loch Killin =

Frigate of the Royal Navy

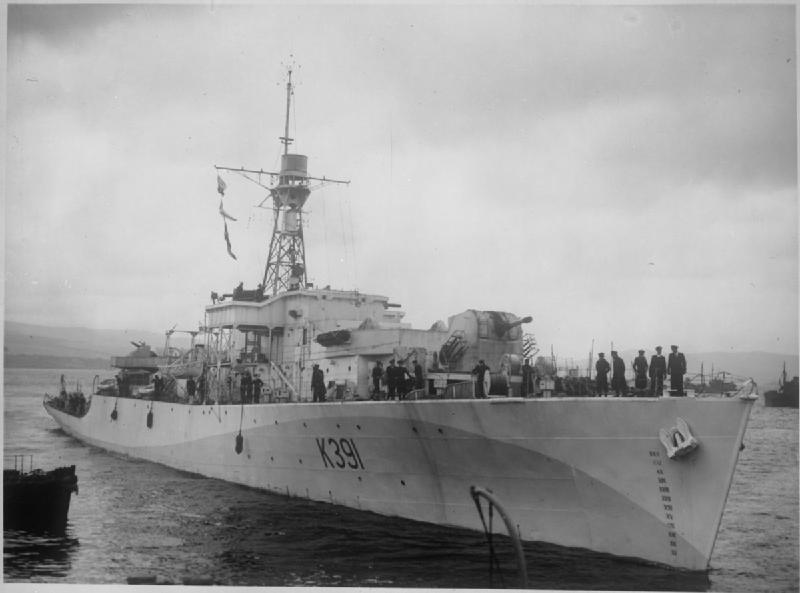
- Loch Killin in May 1944

History

United Kingdom
- Name: HMS Loch Killin
- Namesake: Loch Killin
- Ordered: 6 March 1943
- Builder: Burntisland Shipbuilding Company
- Yard number: 283
- Laid down: 2 June 1943
- Launched: 29 November 1943
- Completed: 12 April 1944
- Commissioned: April 1944
- Decommissioned: September 1945
- Identification: Pennant number K391
- Honours and awards: Atlantic 1944; Biscay 1944; English Channel 1945
- Fate: Sold for scrapping, 1960

General characteristics
- Class & type: Loch-class frigate
- Displacement: 1,435 long tons (1,458 t)
- Length: 286 ft (87 m) p/p; 307 ft 3 in (93.65 m) o/a
- Beam: 38 ft 6 in (11.73 m)
- Draught: 8 ft 9 in (2.67 m) standard; 13 ft 3 in (4.04 m) full
- Propulsion: 2 Admiralty 3-drum boilers; 2 shafts; 4-cylinder vertical triple expansion reciprocating engines, 5,500 ihp (4,100 kW)
- Speed: 20 knots (37 km/h; 23 mph)
- Range: 9,500 nmi (17,600 km) at 12 kn (22 km/h; 14 mph), 730 tons oil fuel
- Complement: 114
- Armament: 1 × QF 4-inch (102 mm) Mark V gun on 1 single mounting HA Mk.III**; 4 × QF 2-pounder (40 mm) guns Mk.VII on 1 quad mount Mk.VII; 4 × 20 mm Oerlikon A/A on 2 twin mounts Mk.V (or 2 × 40 mm Bofors A/A on 2 single mounts Mk.III); Up to 8 × 20 mm Oerlikon A/A on single mounts Mk.III; 2 × Squid triple barrelled A/S mortars; 1 rail and 2 throwers for depth charges

HMS Loch Killin was a Loch-class frigate of the Royal Navy, named after Loch Killin in Scotland. The ship was laid down at Burntisland Shipbuilding Company's yard in Fife on 2 June 1943, and launched on 29 November 1943. She was one of the first vessels armed with the brand new Squid anti-submarine mortar. Decommissioned in September 1945, the ship was put into Reserve, and finally scrapped on 24 August 1960.

== Service history ==
=== 1944 ===
Lock Killin along with the sloop Starling sank the German submarine U-333 on 31 July 1944 to the west of Land's End. This was the first submarine kill using the Squid anti-submarine mortar. On 6 August 1944 Loch Killin sank U-736.

=== 1945 ===
In January and February 1945 Loch Killin was detached for service in the English Channel providing convoy escort and support for short periods, before the rest of 17 EG was transferred to Plymouth for support duty in the Channel in April. On 15 April 1945 Loch Killin sank U-1063 in the English Channel west of Land's End, in position 50°8′54″N 3°53′24″W, with gunfire and depth charges.

After the German surrender in May 1945 Loch Killin and 17 EG returned to the Clyde. In June the ship was transferred to the Rosyth Escort Force to escort convoys to Norway, paying visits to Stavanger, Bergen and Trondheim. In September Loch Killin sailed to Dartmouth to decommission.

=== Decommissioning and disposal ===
After her stores and supplies were removed Loch Killin was put into the Reserve on 7 November 1945 as a Category "B" vessel.

== Bibliography ==
- Boniface, Patrick (2013). Loch Class Frigates. Maritime Books. ISBN 978-1-904459-54-5.
- Colledge, J. J.; Warlow, Ben (2006) [1969]. Ships of the Royal Navy: The Complete Record of All Fighting Ships of the Royal Navy from the 15th Century to the Present (3rd Rev ed.). London: Chatham Publishing. ISBN 978-1-86176-281-8. OCLC 67375475.
- Service Histories of Royal Navy Warships in World War II : HMS Loch Killin
- Uboat.net : HMS Loch Killin
