= SS Cap Tafelneh =

Cargo ship

History
- Name: Sydney Lasry (1920–33); Ariège (1933–38); Cap Tafelneh (1938–40); Carl Arp (1940–45); Empire Chelmer (1945–46); Cap Tafelneh (1946–50); Kandilli (1950–57); Kahraman Doğan (1957–75)
- Owner: Compagnie Lasry (1920–31); Compagnie Générale Transatlantique (1931–38); Société Anonyme de Gérance et d'Armement, (1938–40); German State (1940–45); Ministry of War Transport (1945); Ministry of Transport (1945–46); Société Anonyme de Gerance et d'Armement, (1946–50); Mustafa Nuri Andak (1950–57); Nejat Doğan & Co (1957–72)
- Operator: Joseph Lasry (1920–31); Compagnie Générale Transatlantique (1931–38); Société Anonyme de Gérance et d'Armement, (1938–40); Heinrich F C Arp (1940–45); Ministry of War Transport (1945); Ministry of Transport (1945–46); Société Anonyme de Gerance et d'Armement, (1946–50); Mustafa Nuri Andak (1950–57); Nejat Doğan & Co (1957–75)
- Port of registry: (France) Oran (1920–38); (France) Dunkirk (1938–40); (Nazi Germany) Hamburg (1940–45); (United Kingdom) London (1945–46); (France) Dunkirk (1946–50); (Turkey) Istanbul (1950–75)
- Builder: Burntisland Shipbuilding Company Ltd
- Yard number: 105
- Launched: 3 March 1920
- Completed: September 1920
- Out of service: 1940–41
- Identification: code letters OUAG (1920–34); Call sign FNUA (1934–40)
- Fate: Scrapped 1972

General characteristics
- Tonnage: 2,266 GRT (1920–38), 2,299 GRT (1938–72); 1,410 NRT (1920–38), 1,399 GRT (1938–72); 3,870 DWT (as built)
- Length: 300 ft 6 in (91.59 m)
- Beam: 43 ft 7 in (13.28 m)
- Depth: 22 ft 7 in (6.88 m)
- Installed power: 286 NHP
- Propulsion: 3-cylinder triple expansion steam engine; single screw
- Speed: 12.5 knots (23.2 km/h)
- Notes: sister ship: Cap El Hank

Cap Tafelneh was a 2,266 GRT cargo ship which was built in 1920 by Burntisland Shipbuilding Company Ltd, Fife, Scotland. She was built for Joseph Lasry as Sydney Lasry. In 1931, she was sold to Compagnie Générale Transatlantique and renamed Ariège. In 1938 she was sold to Société Anonyme de Gerance D'Armement and renamed Cap Tafelneh. She was bombed and sunk at Dunkirk in 1940.

Salvaged by Germany, she was renamed after Carl Arp, a German landscape painter and representative of the Weimar Saxon-Grand Ducal Art School (Grossherzoglich-Sächsische Kunstschule Weimar). She was seized as a war prize at Hamburg in May 1945, passed to the Ministry of War Transport (MoWT) and renamed Empire Chelmer. She was returned to Société Anonyme de Gerance D'Armement in 1946 and regained her former name Cap Tafelneh. In 1950, she was sold to Mustafa Nuri Andak, Turkey and renamed Kandilli. In 1957, she was sold to Nejat Doğan & Co and renamed Kahraman Doğan. She served until 1975, when she was sold for scrapping.

== Description ==
The ship was built by Burntisland Shipbuilding Co Ltd, Burntisland, as yard number 105. She was launched on 3 March 1920, and completed in September 1920.

As built, the ship was 300 feet 6 inches (91.59 m) long, with a beam of 43 feet 7 inches (13.28 m) and a depth of 22 feet 7 inches (6.88 m). She had a GRT of 2,266 and a NRT of 1,410. Her DWT was 3,870.

The ship was propelled by a triple expansion steam engine which had cylinders of 22 9/16, 36 and 59 inches (57.3, 91.4 and 149.9 cm) diameter by 39 inches (99 cm) stroke. The engine was built by Cooper & Greig Ltd, Dundee. It could propel the ship at 12.5 knots (23.2 km/h).

== History ==
Sydney Lasry built for the Compagnie Lasry, Oran, French Algeria. She was registered on 23 May 1920. She was completed in September 1920. Her port of registry was Oran, under the French flag and the Code Letters OUAG were allocated. Sydney Lasry was renamed Ariège in 1933. She was sold to the Compagnie Générale Transatlantique in December 1934. Her code letters were changed to FNUA in 1934. On 5 December 1934, Ariège was the first ship to enter port at Safi, Morocco. In March 1938, Ariège was sold to Société Anonyme de Gérance et d'Armement and renamed Cap Tafelneh. Her port of registry was changed to Dunkirk. In 1938, Cap Tafelneh's GRT was recorded as 2,299 and her NRT as 1,399.

Cap Tafelneh was to have been a member of Convoy FS 5, but the convoy was cancelled on 15 May 1940. On 27 May 1940, Cap Tafelneh was sunk in a Luftwaffe air raid on Dunkirk. She was refloated on 13 May 1941. Salvaged by Germany, after repairs she was placed under the management of Heinrich F C Arp, Hamburg. She was renamed after Carl Arp, a German landscape painter and representative of the Weimar Saxon-Grand Ducal Art School (Grossherzoglich-Sächsische Kunstschule Weimar). In May 1945, Carl Arp was seized as a war prize at Hamburg. Ownership was passed to the MoWT and she was renamed Empire Chelmer.

In 1946, she was returned to Société Anonyme de Gerance et d'Armement and regained her former name Cap Tafelneh. In 1950, she was sold to Mustafa Andi Nurak, Istanbul, Turkey and renamed Kandilli. In 1957, she was sold to Nejat Doğan & Co, Istanbul and renamed Kahraman Doğan. She served until 1972. Kahraman Doğan was sold for scrap, arriving at Haliç on 24 April for demolition.
