= Burntisland Shipbuilding Company =

Scottish shipbuilder founded 1918

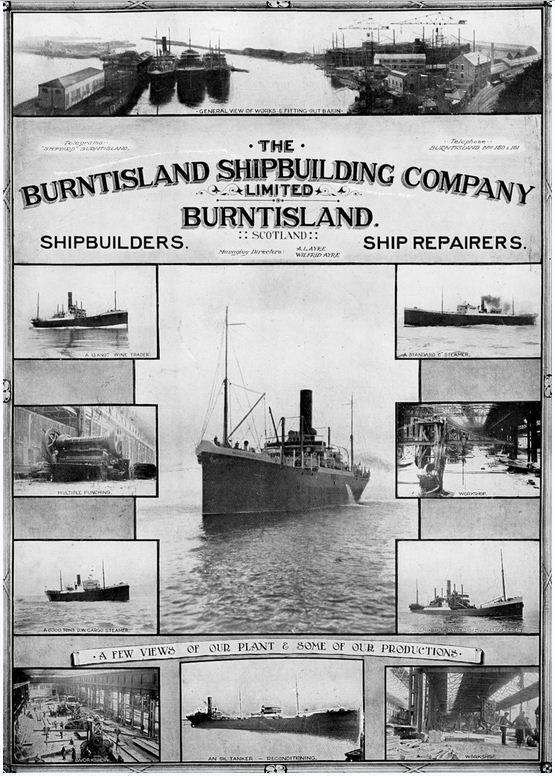
- 1923 advertisement
- Industry: shipbuilding, ship repair
- Founded: 1918
- Fate: receivership & takeover, 1969
- Successor: Robb, Caledon
- Headquarters: Burntisland, Fife, Scotland
- Key people: Amos Ayre, Wilfrid Ayre

The Burntisland Shipbuilding Company was a shipbuilder and repairer in Burntisland, Fife, Scotland that was founded in 1918. In 1969 it was taken over by Robb-Caledon Shipbuilders, which in turn was nationalised in 1977 as part of British Shipbuilders.

In the 1970s the Burntisland yard switched from shipbuilding to prefabricating modules of superstructure for offshore oil platforms, but orders were intermittent and by the 1980s the yard was largely idle. In 1990 new owners returned the yard to production as Burntisland Fabrications or BiFab, resuming the manufacture of superstructure modules for oil platforms. Under a management buyout in 2001 the Burntisland yard returned to being an independent company.

== Founding and early years ==
Brothers Amos Ayre and Wilfrid Ayre founded Burntisland Shipbuilding Co. in 1918 as a First World War emergency shipyard. Its yard at Burntisland West Dock had four berths and capacity to build ships up to 450 feet (140 m) long and up to 59 feet (18 m) beam. However, until the 1950s Burntisland built relatively few vessels more than about 425 feet (130 m) long and 57 feet (17.4 m) beam.

The yard was connected to the North British Railway by an extensive internal rail network that carried steel to various parts of the yard.

Burntisland's first three vessels were standard "C" type cargo ships of just over 3,100 GRT each for the UK Government's wartime Shipping Controller, laid down in 1918 as hull numbers 101, 102 and 103. They were launched in 1919 after the Armistice: hull 101 in June as War Brosna, 102 in September as War Dodder and 103 in November as War Tolka.

Burntisland's first peacetime order was for a pair of 2,300 GRT cargo steamers for Compagnie Lasry of Oran, Algeria. Hulls 104 and 105 were launched in 1920 as Nelly Lasry and Sidney Lasry. In the 1920s the yard built merchant ships ranging from coasters of about 600 tons to ocean-going cargo ships of up to 4,700 tons GRT. Most common were ocean-going four- or five-hold tramp steamers of 1,500 to 2,500 tons.

The yard also built a number of arch-deck colliers from 900 to 2,300 tons GRT. Burntisland built numerous flatiron colliers with low superstructures, hinged funnel and hinged or telescopic mast(s) to fit under bridges upriver from the Pool of London on the River Thames. Burntisland's first flatiron was hull 119, launched in 1922 as the 932 GRT coastal collier Wandle for the Wandsworth, Wimbledon and Epsom District Gas Company. From 1923 to 1946 Burntisland built a further 11 colliers for the same customer, which from 1932 was called the Wandsworth and District Gas Company.

== Surviving the Great Depression ==
Being built in 1918 the yard was modern, well-equipped and thus well-placed to compete during the Great Depression. In 1929 the company introduced its "Burntisland Economy" ship design, intended for maximum fuel efficiency. The concept was popular with ship-owners during the depression and Burntisland continued the design with a succession of developments during the 1930s.

Some ships that Burntisland built for shipping companies went on to become Empire ships under the Ministry of War Transport in the Second World War. Hull 164, launched in 1935 as Roxburgh, became Empire Tower in 1942. Hull 207, launched in 1937 as Ginnheim, became Empire Ouse in 1945.

Burntisland continued to build numerous colliers. Hulls 171 and 172, launched in 1932 as Alexander Kennedy and Ferranti, were a pair of 1,315 GRT flatirons for the London Power Company, which operated Battersea Power Station and Deptford Power Station. Burntisland went on to build six further colliers for the LPC between 1933 and 1945.

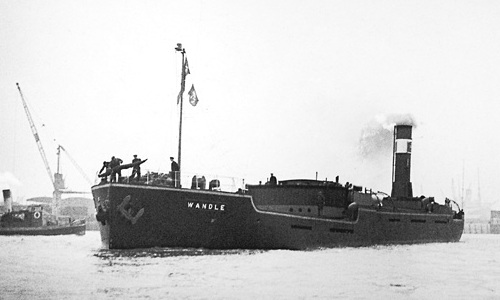
Wandle on her maiden voyage, October 1932

Hull 173 was launched in 1932 as Wandle, a 1,482 GRT flatirons for the Wandsworth, Wimbledon and Epsom District Gas Company. She replaced the previous Wandle that Burntisland had built for the same owner in 1922 (see above).

Hull 174 was launched in 1933 as London Queen, a 781 GRT coaster for the London and Channel Islands Shipping Company. Her owners became British Channel Islands Shipping Co, for whom Burntisland launched a further seven ships between 1937 and 1948.

Hulls 178 and 179, launched in 1933 and 1934 as Pulborough and Petworth, were for Stephenson, Clarke and Associates. Burntisland went on to build eight ships for Stephenson, Clarke spread over nearly 30 years, the last being hull 398 launched in 1961 as MV Gilsland.

Hull 184, launched in 1934 as MV Charles M, was Burntisland's first diesel ship. She was a 403 GRT coaster with a Humboldt-Deutz engine and was built for T.J. Metcalf of London. Burntisland built a second Humboldt-Deutz-engined motor coaster for Metcalf, hull 196, that was launched in 1936 as MV Daniel M.

Hulls 191 and 192, launched in 1935 as Corbrae and Corburn, were for William Cory & Son. Over the next 21 years Burntisland went on to build a total of 17 colliers for Cory, the last two being hulls 376 and 378 launched in 1956 as MV Corstar and MV Corsea.

Hulls 193–195 were a trio of flatirons launched in successive years as Fulham in 1935, Fulham II in 1936 and Fulham III in 1937. They were built for the Metropolitan Borough of Fulham to supply Fulham Power Station. Burntisland went on to build six further flatirons for Fulham between 1938 and 1948.

Hull 213, launched in 1938 as MV Derrymore, was a 4,799 GRT cargo ship for McCowen and Gross of London. Burntisland went on to build a further five ships for McCowen and Gross between 1938 and 1951.

== Second World War ==
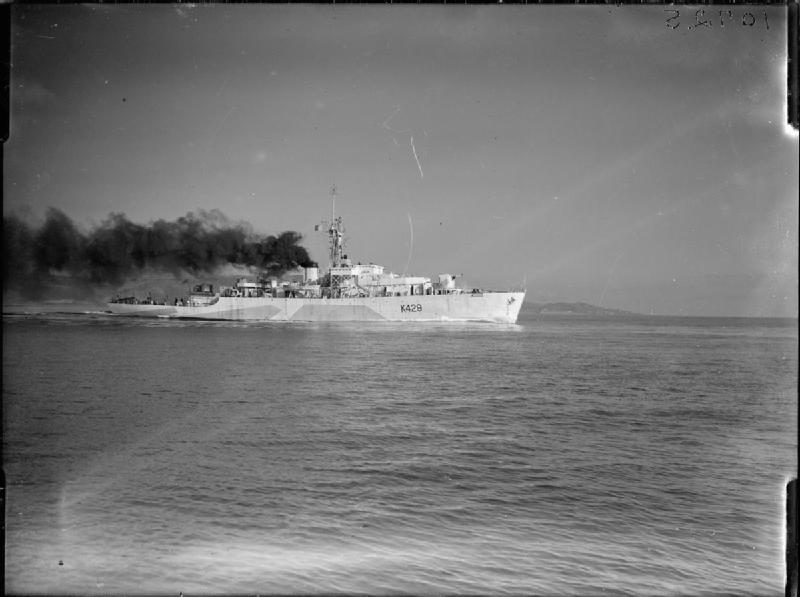
HMS Loch Fyne in October 1944

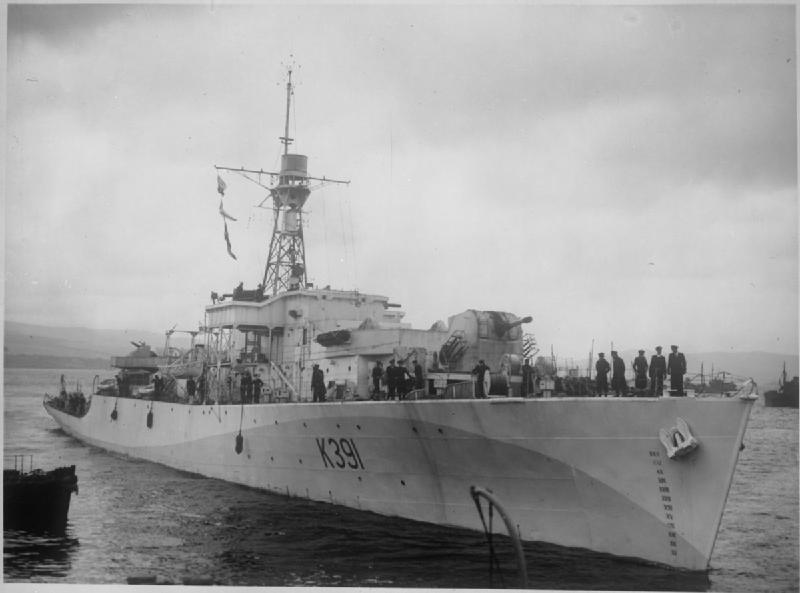
HMS Loch Killin in May 1944

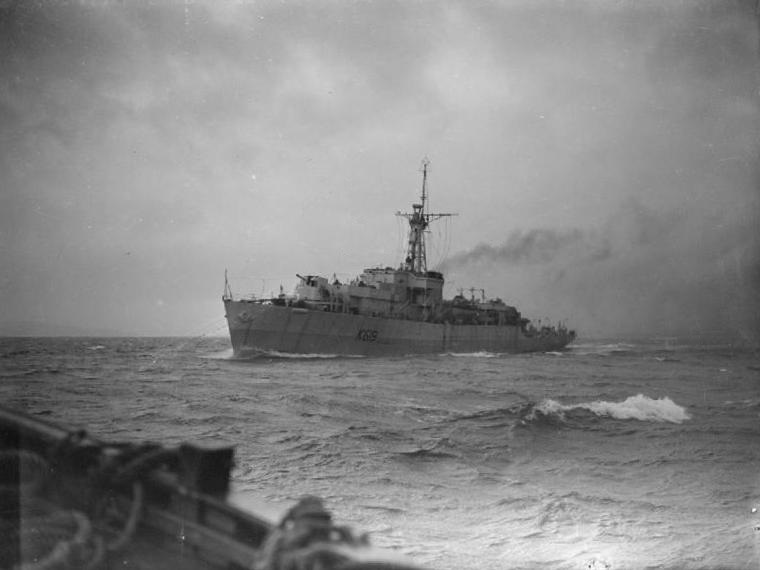
HMS Loch Glendhu in February 1945

During the Second World War Burntisland continued to concentrate on building merchant ships. However, in 1943 it also built three Loch-class frigates: HMS Loch Fyne, HMS Loch Killin and HMS Loch Glendhu.

In May 1941 Burntisland launched hull 233 as Merton, the first of several large standard-design 7,195 GRT cargo ships for the Carlton Steam Ship Co of Newcastle upon Tyne. War shipping needs and losses called for an unprecedented rate of shipbuilding. In July, August and October 1941 Burntisland launched three further large ships of the same standard design for Carlton. They included Earlston, which was torpedoed and sunk off the North Cape in July 1942 less than a year after her launch. Burntisland launched a further two large ships per year for Carlton in 1942–44.

Also in 1941, Burntisland started to build colliers for the Gas Light and Coke Company to supply Beckton Gas Works in east London. Hull 235 was launched in April as the 2,816 GRT Adams Beck. Burntisland went on to build five further colliers for the GL&CC in the 1940s.

In 1942 Burntisland launched hull 264 as the 7,043 GRT cargo ship MV Highland Prince for Prince Line. In 1944 hull 280 was launched as the 7,150 GRT MV Scottish Prince. Burntisland went on to build eight further merchant ships for Prince line between 1946 and 1960.

Burntisland built a number of war standard ships for the Ministry of War Transport, including the 7,290 GRT hulls 261 and 266 launched as Empire Rosalind and Empire Glory in 1942 and 1943. Other MoWT orders included two merchant aircraft carriers: hull 268 launched in 1942 as MV Empire MacAlpine and hull 277 launched in 1943 as MV Empire MacKendrick. Hulls 291 to 294 were launched in February and March 1944 as CHANT 66 to CHANT 69: part of the large CHANT fleet of 400 GRT prefabricated coastal tankers.

Wartime demand rose so high that in 1944–45 Burntisland subcontracted orders for five coasters to Hall, Russell & Company of Aberdeen: hulls 270, 273, 274, 276 and 281.

In April 1945 Burntisland launched hull 290, the 7,541 GRT Padana for the British-India Steam Navigation Company. BI ordered two more cargo ships from Burntisland after the war (see below).

Completion of MoWT orders continued after the surrender of Germany with the launches of hull 298 in May 1945 as the 1,337 GRT coaster Empire Pacific and finally hull 289 in July as the 7,134 GRT cargo ship MV Empire Calshot.

== Post-war production ==
Burntisland continued to build colliers after the war. Hulls 295 and 301, launched in 1946 as Chessington and Mitcham, were the last two flatirons for the Wandsworth and District Gas Co. Hull 328 was launched in 1948 as MV Adams Beck for the GL&CC. Under the Gas Act 1948 the Wandsworth and District Gas Co became part of South Eastern Gas Board, whom Burntisland supplied with five further flatirons between 1949 and 1956.

Hulls 307 and 308, launched in 1947 and 1948 as the 1,776 GRT MV Fulham VIII and 1,759 GRT MV Fulham IX, were the last two flatirons for Fulham Borough Council before the Electricity Act 1947 nationalised Britain's electricity supply industry. Burntisland supplied one collier for the new state-owned British Electricity Authority: hull 341, launched in 1951 as the 1,837 GRT Brimsdown, named after Brimsdown Power Station in north London.

Burntisland maintained its reputation for high quality tramps and cargo-liners. By 1945 a majority of orders were for motor vessels. Hulls 316 and 317 were a pair of 3,668 GRT sister ships for British-India S.N. Co launched in 1948 as MV Warora and MV Warla. Each had a Barclay Curle-Doxford three-cylinder diesel engine.

Hulls 319–321 were launched for the newly founded Christensen Canadian African Lines as the 3,623 GRT MV Thorshall in May 1948, 3,632 GRT MV Thorstrand in December 1948 and 3,713 GRT MV Thorsisle in March 1949. Each ship had a Hawthorn Leslie-Doxford four-cylinder diesel engine.

Hull 330 was launched in 1949 as MV Sycamore, a 3,343 GRT cargo ship for Johnston Warren Lines of Liverpool. Further orders from Johnston Warren Lines were hulls 353 and 355 launched in 1954 as the 3,596 GRT MV Beechmore and 3,597 GRT MV Pinemore, and hull 385 launched in 1958 as the 6,659 GRT cargo ship MV Mystic.

Hulls 334 and 335 were a pair of 3,364 GRT cargo liners for Prince line, launched in 1950 as MV Afric Prince and MV Egyptian Prince. Each ship had a 300 BHP Hawthorn Leslie four-cylinder diesel engine, a top speed of 14 knots (26 km/h) and accommodation for 12 passengers.

Hull 337 was launched in February 1951 as MV Derrymore, a 5,678 GRT cargo ship that replaced one of the same name that Burntisland built for the same customer in 1938. Before the end of 1951 the new Derrymore passed to O. Gross's Power Steam Ship Co as MV Huntsmore. Burntisland built three further ships for Power S.S. Co between 1954 and 1958.

Hull 349 was launched in September 1952 as MV Master Nicos, an 8,453 GRT cargo ship for Motores Maritimos Compañía Limitada, a Greek-owned company registered in Costa Rica. From February 1952 until her launch the resident engineer supervising Master Nicos' construction was Victoria Drummond MBE, the first British woman to have qualified as a marine engineer.

During and after the Second World War the demand for larger cargo ships increased. Burntisland's slipways and berths were limited in size, but in the 1950s the yard managed to build a number of ships of more than 450 feet (140 m) length and 60 feet (18.3 m) beam. Hull 347, launched in 1954 as the 6,515 GRT MV Huntsland for Power S.S. Co, had a length and beam of 477 feet (145 m) and 64 feet (19.5 m). Hull 362, launched in 1956 as the 8,390 GRT (11,850 DWT) MV Capetan Cardemalitis for the Tramp Chartering Corporation of Piraeus, had a length, beam and draught of 479 feet (146 m), 63 feet (19.2 m) and 28 feet (8.5 m).

Hull 367, launched in October 1956 as the 1,873 GRT MV Kingston, was the final flatiron collier for the South Eastern Gas Board. She also turned out to be the last of 28 flatirons that Burntisland had built for various customers over a period of 34 years.

In the 1950s The Scottish and Mercantile Investment Co bought a majority shareholding in the company. However, the Ayre brothers continued to manage the business.

By the mid-1950s orders were sufficient for Burntisland to subcontract two coasters to Hall Russell in Aberdeen. In 1956 Hall Russell launched hull 378 as the 3,373 GRT MV Corsea for Wm. Cory. Hull 379 was launched in Aberdeen as Winga for Glen and Company of Glasgow and completed in 1957. Winga proved to be Burntisland's last steam-powered ship.

=== Turbine steamers ===
In the 1950s there were far fewer orders for ships with reciprocating steam engines. However, geared steam turbines are more compact, more powerful and less vibratory than reciprocating engines. Early in the 1950s Burntisland took two orders for steam turbine cargo ships.

The first order was for a pair of ore carriers for the Panamanian Pan Ore Steam Ship Co, Inc. Hull 352 was launched in 1953 as the 5,000 GRT TSS Dispatcher. Her sister ship hull 351 was launched in 1954 as the 4,952 GRT TSS Discoverer. David Rowan and Company of Glasgow, part of Lithgows Limited, built the turbines and reduction gearing for both ships.

The second turbine order was hull 377, launched in 1956 as TSS Sunvictor for Skibs A/S Geirulv (Gjeruldsen & Tambs) of Arendal, Norway. Her turbine was built by Scotts of Greenock on the River Clyde.

== Cancellations and redundancies ==
In the 1950s Burntisland suffered a number of cancelled orders. Hull 365 was cancelled in 1954 and hull 368 in 1955, but worse came with the cancellation of six hulls in 1959–60. The first three cancelled hulls were all for Power S.S. Co. in about 1959. The last cancellation was hull 396 for Prince Line in about 1960. This left hull 395, launched as the 4,800 GRT MV Lancastrian Prince, as Burntisland's last completed order for Prince Line.

By 2 July 1959 Burntisland Shipbuilding had laid off 100 workers and it was rumoured in the House of Commons that the company was to close down. On 30 October 1959 a new Labour MP, Harry Gourlay, whose Kirkcaldy Burghs constituency included Burntisland, made his maiden speech to the House of Commons. In it he reported that in 1957 about 1,700 people had been employed in shipyards in Kirkcaldy and Burntisland but this workforce had now been reduced to about 800.

On 26 July 1962 Harry Gourlay again expressed concern in the Commons that Burntisland Shipbuilding had made a number of its employees redundant. However, the Conservative MP Frederick Erroll, President of the Board of Trade, replied that the redundancies had not increased unemployment in Burntisland.

On 5 November 1962 Gourlay told the Commons that he blamed the Conservative Government's economic policy for the decline of shipbuilding in the United Kingdom. William Whitelaw MP, Parliamentary Secretary to the Minister of Labour, denied this and replied that the Ministry of Labour planned to create a centre in Fife to retrain redundant workers for alternative employment.

On 14 March and 27 May 1963 and Gourlay told the Commons that Burntisland Shipbuilding had cut its workforce from about 1,500 in 1961 to just over 500 in 1963. (An alternative source states that in 1961 Burntisland had 1,000 employees.) On 14 March Gourlay pleaded for small shipyards on the east coast of Scotland such as Burntisland to be awarded War Department contracts and on 27 May he claimed in the Commons that the Local Employment Act had not led to the creation of any new jobs in Burntisland. Whitelaw conceded that the number of shipyard workers unemployed in Burntisland had risen from six in May 1961 to 116 in May 1963.

In 1963 Sir Wilfrid Ayre retired after 45 years at the head of the company.

== 1960s production ==
Metcalf Motor Coasters renewed its relationship with Burntisland by ordering five new coastal tankers: hull 399 launched in 1961 as MV Ann M, hull 404 launched in 1962 as MV John M, hull 410 launched in 1964 as MV Frank M, hull 411 launched in 1965 as MV Nicholas M and finally hull 417 launched in 1966 as MV Eileen M.

Burntisland succeeded in securing orders from notable customers. Hull 402, launched in 1962 as MV Montreal City and hull 406, launched in 1964 as MV Halifax City were sister ships of just over 6,500 GRT for Bristol City Line. Hull 403, launched in 1962 as MV Beaverpine, was a 4,514 GRT cargo ship for Canadian Pacific Steamships. Hulls 407 and 408, launched in 1964 as MV Newfoundland and MV Nova Scotia, were a pair of 6,660 GRT sister ships for Furness Withy.

Hulls 414 and 415 were also coastal tankers, built as specialist liquid gas carriers. The sister ships were launched for the Nile Steam Ship Co as MV Teviot in 1965 and MV Traquair in 1966 respectively. Burntisland also built a larger tanker, hull 416, launched in 1965 as the 3,971 GRT MV Olau Mark for Olau Line of Denmark.

=== MV Ohrmazd and receivership ===
Hull 418 was launched in April 1967 as the 11,046 GRT MV Ohrmazd, a fast passenger and cargo liner for the East & West Steamship Company of Karachi, Pakistan. However, protracted negotiations with Ohrmazd's owners over the ship's specification delayed her completion until November 1968. This activated a penalty clause in the building contract from which Burntisland Shipbuilding proved unable to recover, and the company went into receivership in 1968.

On 20 December 1968 the Burntisland yard was facing closure and a Conservative MP, James Prior, told the Commons that he hoped it could be averted, but on 22 January 1969 the announcement was made that the yard would close. The next day, 23 January, the Commons debated the Labour Government's Shipbuilding Industry Bill. The Labour MP Gerald Fowler, Joint Parliamentary Secretary to the Ministry of Technology, told the House:

"We in the Ministry of Technology have spared no effort to find, if we can, a commercial solution to this problem to keep this yards in shipbuilding, and the hon. Member for Kirkcaldy Burghs (Mr. Gourlay) has made as strenuous an effort to save this yard, as could be expected of any constituency Member, and all credit is due to him for that, and I hope that his efforts and ours will be rewarded with success."

Under the Shipbuilding Act 1967 the Labour Government offered credit to help the shipbuilding industry. Therefore, during 23 January debate Edward Garrett, Labour MP for Wallsend asked the Minister of Technology, Tony Benn MP, about Burntisland Shipbuilding, "Is it true that since the credit facilities became available little attempt has been made by management, and, I fear, by the Minister, to ascertain whether the medium and small yards are being helped to become more economic?"

A day later, 24 January, the Scottish National Party MP Winnie Ewing asked in the Commons if the Ministry of Technology would form a government holding company to buy the Burntisland yard and keep it and all its employees at work. Gerald Fowler said that it would not, and "the best hope of a long-term solution would be if a shipbuilding undertaking which can find orders capable of being carried out profitably at this yard were to take it over".

On 29 January in the Commons Willie Hamilton, Labour MP for West Fife, called for a public enquiry into the causes of the Burntisland yard's closure. In his reply, Gerald Fowler said:

"I hope that we can reach a commercial and viable solution which will enable the yard to stay in production. However, I must point out that the assistance voted by this House in the Shipbuilding Industry Act was meant to be used not to save uneconomic yards but to assist reorganisation with a view to promoting competitiveness in the industry. If the Burntisland yard fits that pattern, I shall be pleased, but I do not think that an inquiry would help us as of now."

=== Final ships ===
Burntisland launched four more ships after launching Ohrmazd. Hull 419, launched in 1967 as MV Peter Schröder and hull 420, launched in 1968 as MV Paul Schröder, were a pair of cargo ships each of just over 5,000 GRT for Reederei Richard Schröder of Hamburg, Germany. Hull 421, launched in 1968 as MV Christiane Bolten, was a similar cargo ship for another Hamburg customer, the long-established August Bolten William Miller's Nachfolger. Hull 422 was the yard's final vessel, another cargo ship similar to the Peter Schröder and Paul Schröder. She was launched in April 1969 as MV Helen Miller for the St. Vincent Shipping Co. of Liverpool and completed ahead of schedule that July. The yard then made about 800 of its remaining workers redundant.

On 30 April 1970, during another Shipbuilding Bill debate in the Commons, the Liberal MP Jo Grimond asked "Is there any news about the site at Burntisland? ... I understand that it is out of shipbuilding. Is it out of the industry altogether? Is it being used on prefabrication or for any other purpose?" Harold Lever MP, Paymaster General, replied that the Burntisland yard "is now satisfactorily in the East Scotland Group and quite active." Grimond immediately asked "Will it build again?", to which Lever replied "I think it is building now. It is functioning well in another reasonably successful group."

Burntisland's new owner was Robb-Caledon Shipbuilders of Leith and Dundee. On 31 January 1972 Gourlay told the Commons "Now there are only 80 persons employed there [i.e. at Burntisland yard], and even their jobs are in jeopardy unless something is done very soon." His Labour colleague Dick Douglas MP added:

"My hon. Friend indicates a specific problem. It may be that the good offices of the Department can be used to ensure that some of the work that Robb Caledon takes on board is dispersed not only to the Burntisland yard but to the Dundee yard, in view of the present high level of unemployment. The male rate is running at 12.3 per cent., and the local figure is 9.8 per cent. of the insured population of Dundee and Broughty Ferry."

Burntisland still built no more ships, and on 11 February 1972 Robb-Caledon made another 10 workers at Burntisland redundant In the Commons on 6 March 1972 Gourlay again pleaded for Government money to help keep the yard open. The Conservative MP Nicholas Ridley replied that the Department for Trade and Industry had no proposals to help Robb-Caledon. Robb-Caledon eventually removed Burntisland's equipment to its other yards.

== Offshore oil and gas fabrications ==
Robb-Caledon eventually succeeded in attracting orders to build structures for Scotland's North Sea oil and natural gas industry. By December 1972 Burntisland was building a structure for Shell's Auk oilfield. This was followed in 1973 by an order for modules for North Sea oil platforms. By November 1974 Robb-Caledon had formed a Burntisland Engineering Fabricators (BEF) subsidiary and the yard was building modules for the Norwegian sector of the North Sea, but Gourlay complained in the Commons that the yard had lost a potential order for an oil rig to an overseas competitor for reasons of cost and "the geographical conditions on the site".

In April 1975 John Smith MP, Under-Secretary of State for the Department of Energy told the Commons that BEF was one of the UK's two largest constructors for the offshore oil and gas industry. It had not secured orders for offshore platforms but had become the UK's leading builder of modules to fit on them. In December 1975 Gregor Mackenzie MP, a minister at the Department of Industry told the Commons that his department had lent BEF £450,000 under the Industry Act 1972, had given its parent company Robb-Caledon a £400,000 loan and almost £1.1 million in grants and the company was also eligible for grants under the Local Employment Act.

=== Nationalisation and closure ===
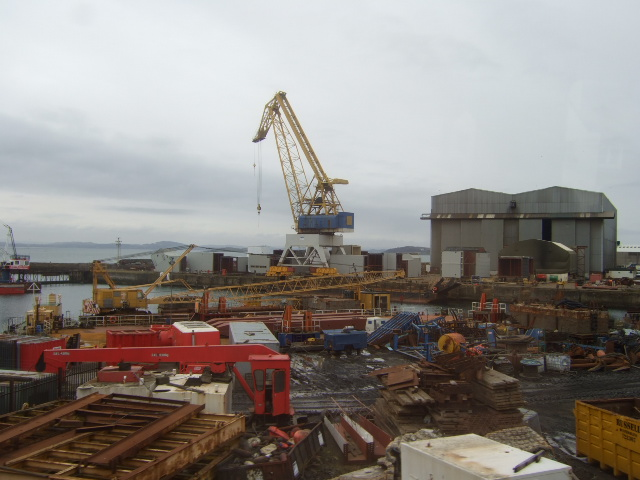
Burntisland Fabrications yard in 2008

Under the Aircraft and Shipbuilding Industries Act 1977 the Labour Government nationalised the UK's shipbuilding industry. Robb-Caledon became a wholly owned subsidiary of British Shipbuilders, which thereby held a 52% share in BEF.

On 7 January 1979 Burntisland was nearing completion of its current order and Gourlay asked in the Commons whether the Secretary of State for Industry "will hold discussions to ensure the continuing operation of the yard at Burntisland when the present contract is completed". Les Huckfield MP replied on behalf of the Secretary of State "Although there are no further orders in prospect for the yard, British Shipbuiders is using its best endeavours to sell the yard as a going concern, thereby preserving employment".

On 24 October 1979 Gourlay told the Commons of the closure of the Burntisland yard and asked what George Younger MP, Secretary of State for Scotland would do to help the unemployed to find to re-employment.

=== Revival ===
In 1990 under new owners Burntisland West Dock resumed the production of major offshore oil and gas fabrications. In 2001 a management buyout took over the yard as Burntisland Fabrications or BiFab. After going into administration in 2020 the company sold its yard at Methil in Fife and its facility at Arnish on Lewis in the Outer Hebrides to Harland and Wolff, which in turn went into administration and has been bought by Navantia. The status of the Burntisland yard is unknown.

== Football club ==
In 1919 a recreation fund was established, funded by a weekly subscription from the workers' wages. The fund created a cricket team, a bowls team and two football teams. In 1925 the football teams were constituted as Burntisland Shipyard Amateur F.C. Since 1929 the club has competed in the Scottish Cup, and the club is now a member of the East of Scotland Football League.
