= Time charter equivalent =

The time charter equivalent (TCE) rate is a standard shipping industry performance measure used primarily to compare period-to-period changes in a shipping company's performance despite changes in the mix of charter types (i.e., spot charters, time charters and bareboat charters) under which the vessels may be employed between the periods. TCE revenue is a non-GAAP measure.

A standard method to compute TCE is to divide voyage revenues (net of expenses) by available days for the relevant time period. Expenses primarily consist of port, canal and fuel costs.
