= HMS Loch Fada =

Frigate of the Royal Navy

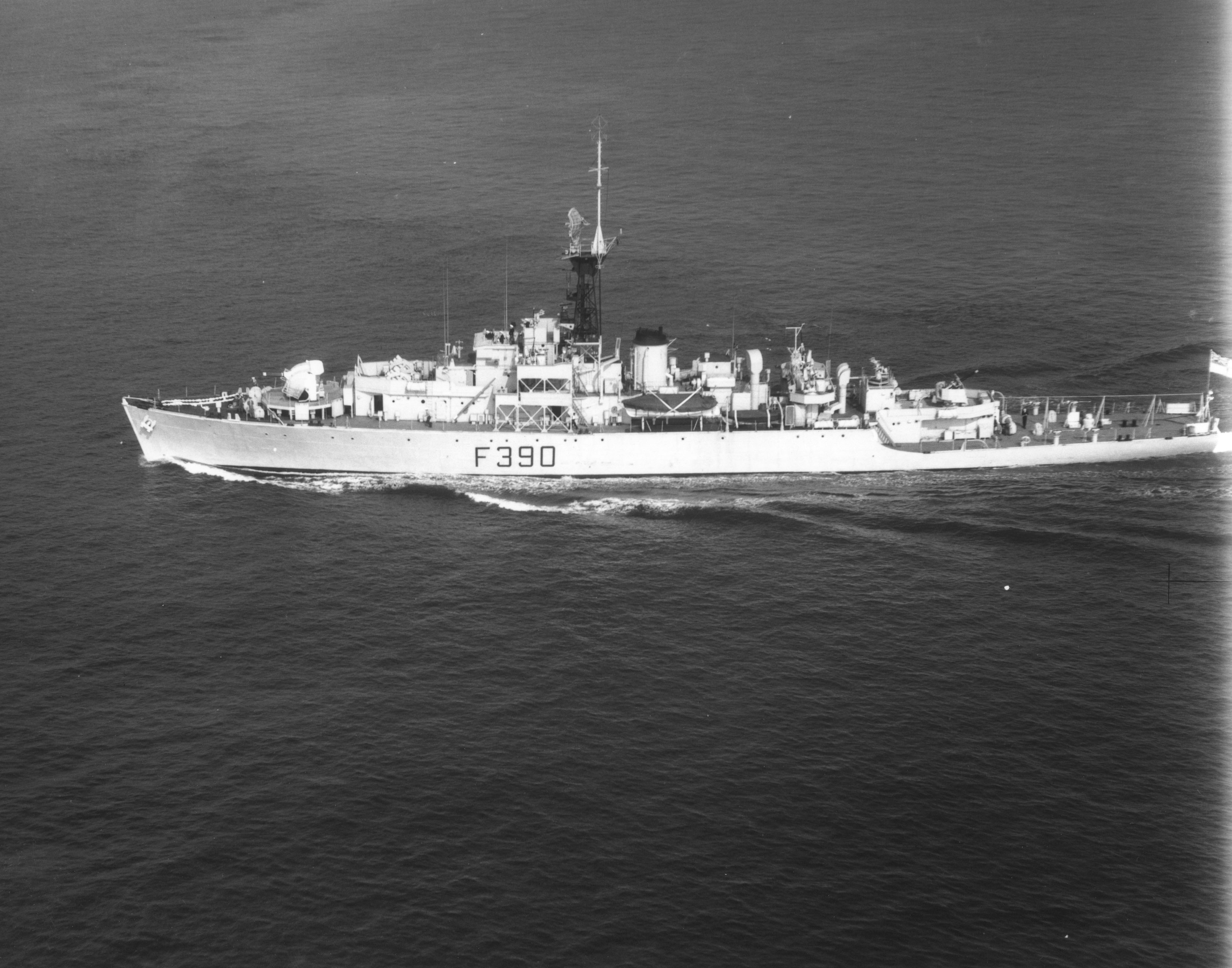
- Loch Fada after modernisation - note twin main gun and F390 pennant

History

United Kingdom
- Name: HMS Loch Fada
- Namesake: Loch Fada, Colonsay
- Ordered: 19 January 1943
- Builder: John Brown & Company, Clydebank, Scotland
- Yard number: 6147
- Laid down: 8 June 1943
- Launched: 14 December 1943
- Completed: 10 April 1944
- Commissioned: April 1944
- Decommissioned: April 1952
- Recommissioned: June 1955
- Decommissioned: October 1967
- Identification: Pennant number K390/F390
- Honours and awards: Normandy 1944; English Channel 1945; Atlantic 1945
- Fate: Sold for scrapping, 1970

General characteristics
- Class & type: Loch-class frigate
- Displacement: 1,435 long tons (1,458 t)
- Length: 307 ft 9 in (93.80 m)
- Beam: 38 ft 9 in (11.81 m)
- Draught: 8 ft 9 in (2.67 m)
- Propulsion: 2 Admiralty 3-drum boilers; 2 shafts; 4-cylinder vertical triple expansion reciprocating engines, 5,500 hp (4,100 kW)
- Speed: 20 knots (37 km/h; 23 mph)
- Range: 9,500 nmi (17,600 km) at 12 kn (22 km/h; 14 mph)
- Complement: 114
- Armament: 1 × QF 4 inch Mark V on 1 single mounting HA Mk.III**; 4 × QF 2-pounder Mk.VII on 1 quad mount Mk.VII; 4 × 20 mm Oerlikon A/A on 2 twin mounts Mk.V (or 2 × 40 mm Bofors A/A on 2 single mounts Mk.III); Up to 8 × 20 mm Oerlikon A/A on single mounts Mk.III; 2 × Squid triple barreled A/S mortars; 1 rail and 2 throwers for depth charges

HMS Loch Fada was the lead ship of the Loch-class frigates of the British Royal Navy, built by John Brown & Company of Clydebank, Scotland, and named after Loch Fada in the Inner Hebrides.

The ship was laid down on 8 June 1943, launched on 14 December, and commissioned in April 1944. She was attached to Captain Johnny Walker's 2nd Escort Group which was detailed to guard the Western Approaches of the British Isles. After the war she was attached to the Londonderry Flotilla until 1952.

Recommissioned in 1955, she operated in the Persian Gulf. After a period of fishery protection after the first "Cod War" between Great Britain and Iceland she served in the Far East from 1962, and supported operations during the Indonesian Confrontation. After decommissioning in 1969 she was used as a testbed in the development of Sea Wolf surface-to-air missiles, and was finally scrapped in 1970.

== Service history ==
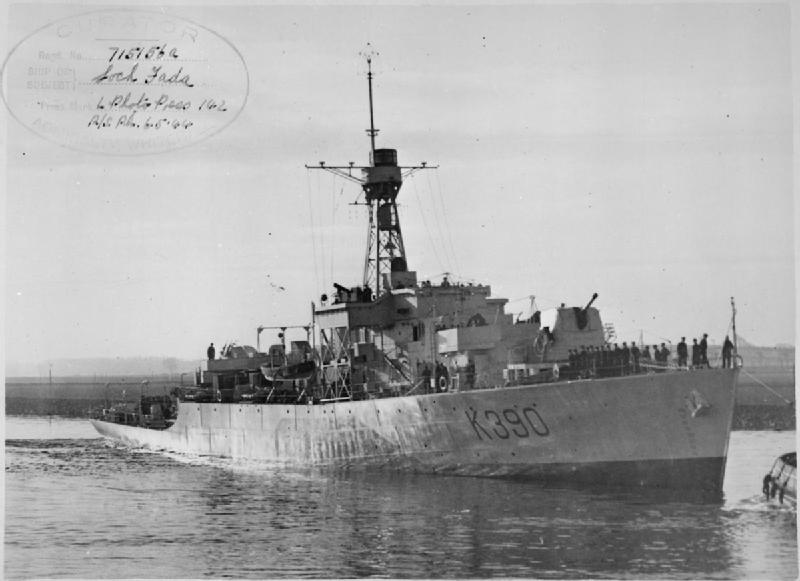
Loch Fada in April 1944, around the time she was commissioned

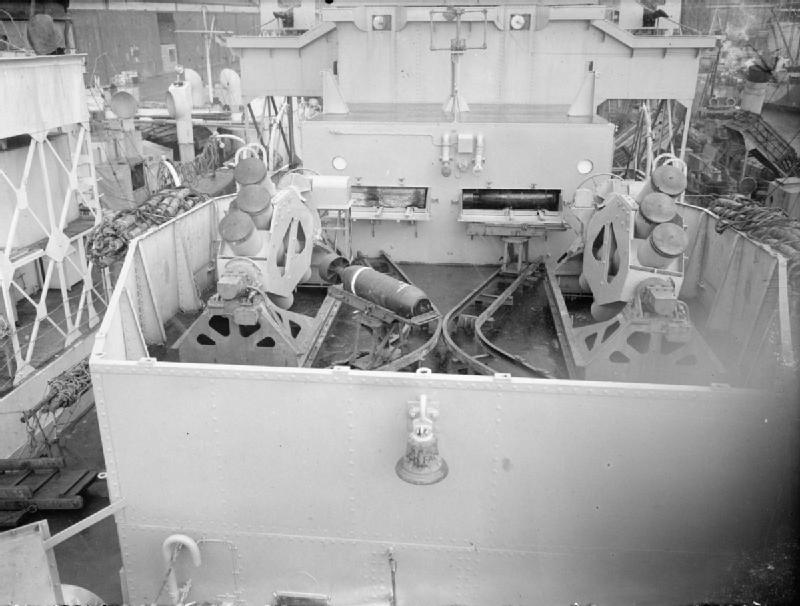
Loch Fada's squid anti-submarine launchers, 1944 (IWM)

=== World War II ===
Commissioned in April 1944 Loch Fada joined the 2nd Escort Group at Plymouth in June after sea trials, and was deployed with the Group in anti-submarine operations during the Normandy landings ("Operation Neptune"). She took part in the sinking of the German submarine U-333 on 31 July, and also of U-736 and U-385 in early August. The Group was then released from anti-submarine operations and transferred to Derry to support of convoy defence in the North-West Approaches for the rest of the year.

In January 1945 the Group was deployed in the South-Western Approaches for anti-submarine support. On 27 February Loch Fada was involved in the sinking of the U-boat U-1018 using depth charges near Penzance, Cornwall. Two hours earlier, U-1018 had attacked convoy BTC 81 about seven miles from Lizard Point, Cornwall (at 49°55′N 05°22′W). A torpedo hit the Norwegian freighter SS Corvus which sank within a few minutes, resulting in the death of five of the freighter's Norwegian crew, a 16-year-old British cabin boy, Thomas Boniface, and two British Royal Navy gunners, (part of the DEMS gun crew) including former professional footballer Charlie Sillett.

After the German surrender in May 1945 the Group was transferred to the Home Fleet to support of the re-occupation of Norway.

=== Londonderry, 1945–1952 ===
In July 1945 Loch Fada was transferred to the Anti-Submarine Flotilla for training duties, based at Derry. In December 1945 and January 1946, as part of "Operation Deadlight", she escorted German U-boats from Loch Ryan out into the North-Western Approaches where they were sunk. The ship then returned to Derry. The Anti-Submarine Flotilla was renamed the 4th Escort Flotilla in September 1946, and to the 3rd Training Flotilla in early 1949. In early 1951 she took part in the search for missing submarine Affray. In April 1952 Loch Fada was laid up at Portsmouth in Reserve.

=== Upgrade and Persian Gulf, 1955–1961 ===
Loch Fada was one of seven members of her class selected for extensive modernisation in 1953. The single 4-inch (100 mm) gun was replaced by the ubiquitous twin 4-inch (100 mm) mounting HA/LA Mark XIX and the A/A weaponry was standardised as a single twin mounting Mark V and four single mounting Mark VII for the 40 mm Bofors gun, with a Simple Tachymetric Director shipped for the Mark V. Type 277 radar was fitted with the new ANU antenna array.

She was recommissioned on 21 July 1955 and joined the Home Fleet for exercises and port visits. In November she sailed from Portsmouth for service in the Persian Gulf based at Bahrain. There she carried out regular patrols and visits. In March 1956 Loch Fada was diverted from her usual patrol station and sent to Mombasa to embark Archbishop Makarios who was taken to Mahé, Seychelles, for detention because of his political activities. The ship then sailed to Colombo for a refit, before joining the East Indies Squadron in April for exercises. The ship then visited Cochin, Bombay and Karachi before returning to the Gulf in July. In September she was relieved by Loch Killisport and returned to Portsmouth, arriving on 8 November.

After a refit, Loch Fada sailed from Portsmouth on 17 May 1957, arriving back at Bahrain on 4 July. In November and December she took part in a CENTO exercise off Karachi with Loch Alvie, the cruiser Gambia, and ships of the Indian, Pakistani, Turkish and United States navies. In 1958 she resumed her Persian Gulf duties, and in March was sent to search for the Norwegian passenger ship Skaubryn which was on fire in Indian Ocean. The ship was carrying emigrants from Bremerhaven to Australia. The ship was found abandoned, and taken in tow, and after two days handed over to the Dutch tug Cyclops. Loch Fada then returned to the UK, arriving at Portsmouth on 14 May. After a refit the ship returned to Bahrain in December for the usual patrol duties. In July 1959 an inspection showed that extensive repairs were required and Loch Fada was withdrawn from service and returned to Portsmouth.

The ship returned to service in January 1960 attached to the 6th Frigate Squadron. In March and April she was deployed off Iceland on Fishery Protection duties. In June Loch Fada returned to the Persian Gulf patrol, with duties including patrolling to stop gun running to rebels in Oman, capturing a dhow smuggling explosives, including 60 anti-tank mines on 16 July 1960. She took part in the CENTO "Exercise MIDLINK II" with warships of other nations in October and November. January 1961 saw her take part in an Amphibious Warfare "Exercise ASPEX 7" with Loch Fyne and Loch Ruthven, and she was then deployed for Air-Sea Rescue duties in the Arabian Sea during the Royal Flight to India by Queen Elizabeth and Prince Philip. She then cruised along the coast of East Africa calling at Mombasa, Tanga, Lindi, Mtwara and Dar es Salaam, before transiting the Suez Canal in April, to take part in the commemoration of the 20th Anniversary of the Siege of Tobruk, providing men for the ceremonial parade, and firing a Gun Salute for King Idris of Libya. She arrived at Chatham in June for an extensive refit which saw the installation of a centralised air conditioning system and modernisation of her radar, weapons and communications.

=== Eastern Fleet, 1962–1967 ===
Loch Fada returned to service in June 1962 assigned to the 3rd Frigate Squadron of the Far East Fleet. She arrived at Colombo in October and was deployed in the Indian Ocean, calling at Diego Garcia and Malé, Maldives. From December until February 1963 she was deployed off Borneo to support of military operations during the Indonesia–Malaysia confrontation (the Konfrontasi). In March and April 1963 Loch Fada was deployed for a patrol in Pacific, calling at Manus in the Admiralty Islands, Suva in Fiji, Phoenix Island and Guam, before calling at Hong Kong and then several ports in Japan. She returned to Borneo in June to support military operations and on piracy patrol for the rest of the year.

In 1964 various patrols and exercises occupied the ship, including: "Exercise JET", a multi-national exercise in the Indian Ocean in March, and amphibious exercises with the commando carrier Centaur, destroyer Cavendish and oiler RFA Tidereach in May. From June to August she was assigned to Gulf patrol duties before returning to Singapore. There she remained for the remainder of her active career, patrolling off Borneo, and taking part in exercises. In September 1965 she was transferred to the 26th Escort Squadron when the 3rd Frigate Flotilla disbanded, but remained stationed at Singapore, periodically refitting at Hong Kong. In May 1967 she visited Japanese ports and took part in exercises. Finally in August she sailed for the UK, arriving back at Portsmouth on 11 October 1967, and was decommissioned and laid up in Reserve.

== Publications ==
- Boniface, Patrick (2013). Loch Class Frigates. Maritime Books. ISBN 978-1-904459-54-5.
- Colledge, J. J.; Warlow, Ben (2006) [1969]. Ships of the Royal Navy: The Complete Record of All Fighting Ships of the Royal Navy from the 15th Century to the Present (3rd Rev ed.). London: Chatham Publishing. ISBN 978-1-86176-281-8. OCLC 67375475.
- Marriott, Leo, 1983. Royal Navy Frigates 1945-1983, Ian Allan Ltd. ISBN 07110 1322 5
