= HMNZS Rotoiti (F625) =

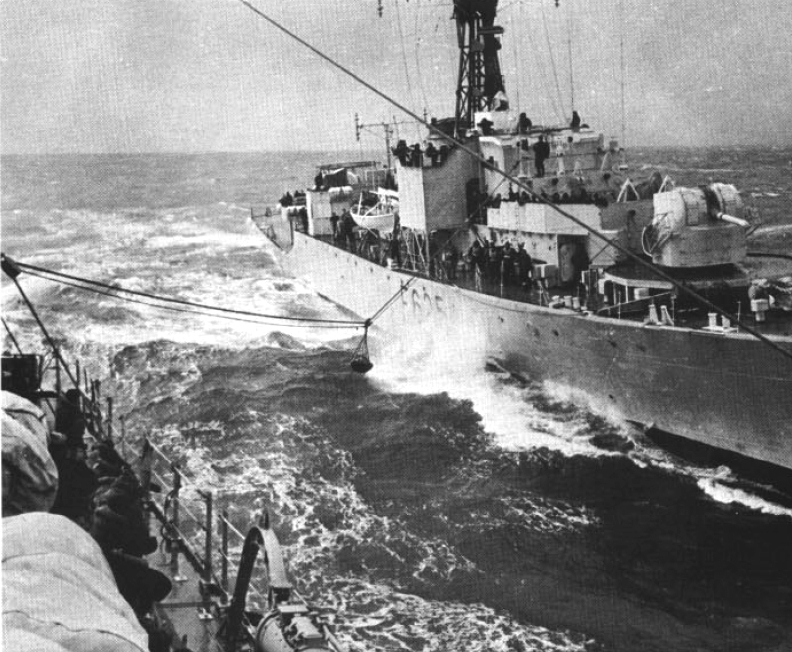
- HMNZS Rotoiti underway circa 1964

History

United Kingdom
- Name: HMS Loch Katrine
- Namesake: Loch Katrine
- Ordered: 25 January 1943
- Builder: Henry Robb, Leith
- Yard number: 347
- Laid down: 31 December 1943
- Launched: 21 August 1944
- Completed: 29 December 1944
- Commissioned: December 1944
- Decommissioned: May 1946
- Fate: Sold to New Zealand, 1948

New Zealand
- Name: HMNZS Rotoiti
- Acquired: 1948
- Commissioned: 7 May 1949
- Decommissioned: April 1953
- Recommissioned: February 1957
- Decommissioned: August 1965
- Motto: Takaia; ("Bind together")
- Fate: Sold for scrapping, 1966

General characteristics
- Class & type: Loch-class frigate
- Displacement: 1,435 long tons (1,458 t)
- Length: 307 ft 9 in (93.80 m)
- Beam: 38 ft 9 in (11.81 m)
- Draught: 8 ft 9 in (2.67 m)
- Propulsion: 2 Admiralty 3-drum boilers; 2 shafts; 4-cylinder vertical triple expansion reciprocating engines, 5,500 hp (4,100 kW)
- Speed: 20 knots (37 km/h; 23 mph)
- Range: 9,500 nmi (17,600 km) at 12 kn (22 km/h; 14 mph)
- Complement: 114
- Armament: 1 × QF 4 inch Mark V on 1 single mounting HA Mk.III**; 4 × QF 2 pounder Mk.VII on 1 quad mount Mk.VII; 4 × 20 mm Oerlikon A/A on 2 twin mounts Mk.V (or 2 × 40 mm Bofors A/A on 2 single mounts Mk.III); Up to 8 × 20 mm Oerlikon A/A on single mounts Mk.III; 2 × Squid triple barrelled A/S mortars; 1 rail and 2 throwers for depth charges

HMNZS Rotoiti (F625) was a Loch-class frigate of the Royal New Zealand Navy (RNZN), which had formerly served in the British Royal Navy as HMS Loch Katrine at the end of World War II.

== Service history ==
=== World War II ===
Built by Henry Robb of Leith, the ship was launched on 21 August 1944 and commissioned as Loch Katrine in December 1944. She served as an escort for the Gibraltar convoys until the end of World War II, and then in the Indian Ocean with the Eastern Fleet. The ship was decommissioned in May 1946 and laid-up in reserve.

=== Sale to New Zealand ===
In 1948 Loch Katrine was sold to New Zealand for £234,150. After refitting at HMNB Portsmouth she was commissioned into the Royal New Zealand Navy on 7 May 1949, and renamed Rotoiti on 16 May by Mrs Bill Jordan, wife of the New Zealand High Commissioner. In June Rotoiti exercised with the Mediterranean Fleet and in July took passage with Tutira to Auckland, via Aden and Singapore, arriving in August to join the 11th Frigate Squadron for patrols and visits in the South-Western Pacific.

=== 1st Korean tour, 1950–1951 ===
On 29 June 1950, in response to an appeal from the United Nations, New Zealand made two frigates available for UN service in Korea. On 7 October Rotoiti sailed from Auckland to Sasebo, calling at Darwin and Hong Kong, and arriving in Japan on 5 November to relieve Pukaki. She then sailed to Inchon for convoy escort, harbour control, and patrol duties. In December she embarked senior UN officers and a US news correspondent during a visit to the Han River. Rotoiti's deployment off the west coast of Korea continued into the next year with maintenance and leave periods spent at Kure, Japan.

On 17 July 1951 during a patrol in the approaches of Chinnampo harbour she carried out an attack on an enemy gun position at Sogon-Ni Point. An assault party of 14 men, supported by gunfire from the ship, landed and took two enemy soldiers prisoner. On 25 August she carried out second raid on gun positions at Sogon-Ni. The shore party, which included Royal Marines from HMS Ceylon landed, but came under fire and 19-year-old Able Seaman Robert Edward Marchioni was killed. He was the only RNZN casualty of the Korean War.

On 25 October while en route from Kure to Hong Kong she received a distress message from the British merchant ship SS Hupeh which had been boarded by pirates in the Yangtze River estuary. The pirates threatened reprisals if Hupeh were boarded, but agreed to leave the ship if they were granted safe passage to a nearby island. To avoid bloodshed this was accepted. After calling at Hong Kong, the frigate returned to Auckland, via Borneo and Brisbane, arriving in November for service in the 11th Frigate Flotilla.

=== 2nd Korean tour, 1952–1953 ===
On 7 January 1952 Rotoiti sailed for her second Korean tour of duty, relieving Hawea at Sasebo on 2 February. In October while at Kure she was visited by the First Sea Lord, Admiral Sir Rhoderick McGrigor. Her final patrol off the west coast of Korea was in February 1953, before returning to Auckland on 19 March. After a refit and modernisation the ship was reduced to Reserve status in 1954 and was laid-up at Auckland.

=== Operation Grapple, 1957 ===
In February 1957 Rotoiti was recommissioned to support the "Operation Grapple" nuclear weapon trials at Christmas Island, arriving there on 31 March. Nuclear trials monitoring occupied the rest of the year in rotation with Pukaki.

=== Eastern Fleet, 1958–1961 ===
In 1958 the frigate was deployed for squadron duties at Auckland. In May, after refitting, she sailed to Singapore to join the 3rd Frigate Squadron, Far East Fleet as part of the Commonwealth Strategic Reserve. Deployed with the Squadron for exercises and visits, she carried out joint exercises with the United States Navy off Japan, and anti-piracy patrols off North Borneo. In March 1959 she escorted the Royal Yacht HMY Britannia during a Royal visit to Tarawa in the Gilbert and Ellice Islands, and was visited by Prince Philip, Duke of Edinburgh before returning to Auckland in April.

An extended refit took place from August, to the same standard as the modernised Royal Navy Loch-class frigates, including updated UHF radio and electronic warfare equipment. Accommodation was improved and two Bofors 40 mm mountings were fitted in place of the obsolescent 2-pounder pom-pom.

In March 1960, after sea trials and joint exercises off Sydney with the Royal Australian Navy, Rotoiti returned to the 3rd Frigate Squadron at Singapore for an extensive programme of Fleet and joint exercises and visits, calling at Bangkok, Port Swettenham and Pangkor, and then Tokyo and Manila. She returned to Auckland in March 1961 to rejoin the 11th Frigate Squadron.

=== 11th Frigate Squadron, 1961–1965 ===
Rotoiti was deployed with the Squadron for exercises and visits until June 1962, then was refitted for deployment as part of "Operation Deep Freeze" in the Antarctic. She arrived at Expedition Headquarters at Lyttelton on 8 October, then sailed into the Southern Ocean with 31 trainee seamen ratings aboard, to carry out meteorological and oceanographic studies, finally returning to Auckland on 12 December.

From January to September 1963 she carried out Flotilla duties in New Zealand waters and Pacific Islands patrols. In October and November Rotoiti was again detached for meteorological reporting and Air-Sea Rescue duty in "Operation Deep Freeze". On 3 February 1964 Rotoiti sailed to Fiji to escort the Royal Yacht Britannia during a Royal Visit to Fiji and New Zealand by The Queen Mother. Joining the Royal Yacht at Lautoka on the 10th, she escorted the yacht during visits to Wellington, Timaru, Bluff, and Dunedin. From March 1964 Rotoiti served as a training ship for New Entry Seamen ratings, until August 1965 when she was decommissioned and put into Reserve at Auckland.

=== Disposal ===
Rotoiti was placed on the Disposal List in 1966, and sold for scrapping to the Hong Kong Rolling Mills. On 18 January 1967 Rotoiti was paired with sister ship Kaniere and towed by the tug Daisy to Hong Kong for breaking up.

== See also ==
- Frigates of the Royal New Zealand Navy
