= HMS Loch Achanalt =

Frigate of the Royal Navy

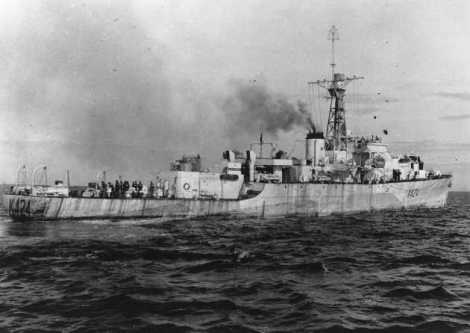
- HMCS Loch Achanalt

History

United Kingdom
- Name: Loch Achanalt
- Ordered: 24 July 1942
- Builder: Henry Robb, Leith
- Yard number: 342
- Laid down: 14 September 1943
- Launched: 23 March 1944
- Completed: 11 August 1944
- Fate: Loaned to Canada 1944, returned 1945. Sold to New Zealand, March 1948

Canada
- Name: Loch Achanalt
- Commissioned: 31 July 1944
- Decommissioned: July 1945
- Honours and awards: English Channel 1945
- Fate: Returned to UK 1945

New Zealand
- Name: Pukaki
- Acquired: March 1948
- Commissioned: 13 September 1948
- Decommissioned: May 1965
- Fate: Sold for scrapping, October 1965

General characteristics
- Class & type: Loch-class frigate
- Displacement: 1,435 long tons
- Length: 286 ft (87 m) p/p; 307.25 ft (93.65 m) o/a
- Beam: 38.5 ft (11.7 m)
- Draught: 8.75 ft (2.67 m) standard; 13.25 ft (4.04 m) full
- Propulsion: 2 Admiralty 3-drum boilers, 2 shafts; 4-cylinder vertical triple expansion reciprocating engines, 5,500 ihp or Parsons single reduction geared turbines, 6,500 shp
- Range: 730 tons oil fuel, 9,500 nautical miles (17,600 km) at 12 knots (22 km/h)
- Complement: 114
- Armament: 1 × QF 4-inch (102 mm) Mark V gun on one single mounting HA MkIII**; 4 × QF 2-pounder (40 mm) MkVII guns on 1 quad mount MkVII; 4 × 20 mm Oerlikon A/A on 2 twin mounts MkV (or 2 × 40 mm Bofors A/A on 2 single mounts Mk.III); up to 8 × 20 mm Oerlikon A/A on single mounts MkIII; 2 × Squid triple barreled A/S mortars; 1 rail and 2 throwers for depth charges

HMS Loch Achanalt was a Loch-class frigate of the Royal Navy that was loaned to and served with the Royal Canadian Navy during World War II. Ordered from Henry Robb, Leith, on 24 July 1942 as a River-class frigate, the order was changed, and ship laid down on 14 September 1943, and launched by Mrs. A.V. Alexander, wife of the First Lord of the Admiralty on 23 March 1944 and completed on 11 August 1944. After the war she was transferred to the Royal New Zealand Navy and renamed HMNZS Pukaki (F424).

== Design and construction ==
The Loch class was designed to meet the requirement for large numbers of long-range escorts for the Royal Navy. They were a development of the earlier River class, but designed for mass production, with pre-fabricated sections to be built by general engineering companies and assembled at shipyards. Anti-submarine armament and sonar was also significantly improved.

The ships were 307 ft 0 in (93.57 m) long overall and 286 ft 0 in (87.17 m) between perpendiculars, with a beam of 38 ft 6 in (11.73 m), and a draught of 12 ft 4 in (3.76 m). Displacement was 1,435 long tons (1,458 t) standard and 2,260 long tons (2,300 t) deep load. The ships were powered by two 4-cylinder triple expansion steam engines fed with steam from two Admiralty 3-drum boilers and rated at 5,500 indicated horsepower (4,100 kW). This gave a speed of 19.5 knots (36.1 km/h; 22.4 mph). Sufficient fuel was carried to give a range of 4,800 nautical miles (8,900 km; 5,500 mi) at 15 knots (28 km/h; 17 mph) in tropical waters.

The ships' main gun armament was a single QF 4-inch (102 mm) Mk V gun forward, with an anti-aircraft armament of a quadruple 2-pounder (40 mm) pom-pom aft and at least six Oerlikon 20 mm cannon (two twin powered mountings and at least two single mounts). Two Squid anti-submarine mortars were fitted, with 120 rounds carried, backed up by 15 conventional depth charges. Type 147B and Type 144 sonars were fitted, while Type 277 radar detected surface and air targets. As built, the ship had a complement of 114 officers and men.

Loch Achanalt was originally ordered from the Henry Robb shipyard as a River-class frigate to be called Naver on 24 July 1942, but the order was changed to a Loch-class frigate and the name changed to Loch Achanalt. The ship was laid down at Robb's Leith yard on 14 September 1943, was launched on 23 March 1944 and completed on 11 August 1944 with the pennant number K424.

== Service history ==
=== As Loch Achanalt (K424) ===
In February 1944, it was decided to loan Loch Achanalt to the Royal Canadian Navy, and the ship was commissioned on 31 July 1944 after initial sea trials. The frigate joined the 6th Canadian Escort Group based at Londonderry Port for convoy defence and anti-submarine operations in the North-Western Approaches, starting operations on 7 September 1944. On 16 October, the 6th Canadian Escort Group was deployed South-West of the Faroe Islands to stop German submarines from getting into the North Atlantic from bases in Norway. The frigate Annan attacked a sonar contact with depth charges, before returning to the rest of the escort group. In fact the contact was the German submarine U-1006, which had been badly damaged. Loch Achanalt spotted the submarine using radar when U-1006 surfaced, and Annan ran in to attack the submarine. U-1006 fired a T-5 acoustic torpedo which missed Annan and then a gun duel developed, with Annan hitting the submarine several times with her 4-inch gun, and U-1006 wounded 8 of Annan's crew with fire from 20-mm cannon. Annan closed further and dropped more depth charges, which sank the submarine. Seven of the 52-man crew of U-1006 were killed.

In November–December 1944, Loch Achanault was fitted with additional bracing to rectify problems with hull stiffness that the class suffered with. In January 1945 the 6th Escort Group was transferred to convoy defence duties in the English Channel based at Portsmouth. From 14 March to 20 April, the group were deployed from Plymouth to the English Channel and South-Western Approaches on convoy defence duties. Later in April they sailed to Halifax for convoy defence duties. Following the German surrender, the Group was disbanded on 23 May 1945. Loch Achanalt then sailed back to Britain, and was reduced to reserve at Sheerness in June before formally being returned to the Royal Navy in July.

In March 1948 Loch Achanalt was sold to Royal New Zealand Navy with five other Loch-class frigates. On 13 September 1948 she was formally transferred and renamed HMNZS Pukaki (F424).

=== As Pukaki (F424) ===
On 15 October 1948 Pukaki sailed from Portland with three other Loch-class frigates (Hawea, Kaniere and Taupo, transiting via the Mediterranean, with the four frigates working up at Malta, arriving at Auckland on 5 January 1949 to join the 11th Frigate Flotilla for patrols and exercises.

On 25 June 1950 Pukaki was placed at the disposal of the UN Forces in Korea. In August Pukaki and sister-ship Tutira arrived at Sasebo to join the UN naval command. Initially attached to Task Group 96.5 for escort duties between Japan and Korea, in September she was transferred to Task Group 90.7 to support of landings by the US 1st Marine Division at Inchon, rejoining Task Group 96.5 in October. In November she was relieved by the frigate Rotoiti and returned to Auckland to refit, after which she was placed in reserve.

Recommissioned in December 1952 for service in the 11th Frigate Flotilla, Pukaki was assigned to detached service with the Royal Navy's Far East Fleet 4th Frigate Squadron based at Singapore in September 1953. In January 1954 the frigate was deployed in the Yellow Sea for trade protection and as back-up to UN forces in Korea if required. In May she was transferred to Singapore for anti-terrorist operations in the Malayan Emergency, returning to Auckland in September.

She rejoined the 4th Frigate Squadron in the Far East Fleet in June 1955, for trade protection and Korean coast guard ship duties, while also carrying out joint exercises with United States Navy ships, returning to Auckland in May 1956. In December she escorted the supply vessel Endeavour during the initial stage of the journey to McMurdo Sound in Antarctica.

In 1957 and 1958 the ship was deployed as a weather reporting ship during the "Operation Grapple" nuclear tests at Christmas Island. Between 1959 and 1962 she once more joined the Far East Fleet for SEATO exercises and patrols. From 1963 to 1965 she supported the United States "Operation Deep Freeze" Antarctic operations. Pukaki alternated with an American Edsall-class DER picket frigate operating from Dunedin in summer months to track United States Navy Lockheed C-130 Hercules deployments and other flights from Harewood airport in Christchurch to McMurdo Base in the Ross Dependency, offering the potential for search and rescue in the Southern Ocean and service to the weather station on Campbell Island. Sea conditions probably shortened by two years the service life of Pukaki and the other surviving Loch-class frigate, Rotoiti. This forced the United States Navy to deploy two Edsall-class DERs to Dunedin for the final three deployments in 1966–68.

Put into reserve in May 1965 Pukaki was sold in October. The ship was towed to Hong Kong and scrapped in January 1966.

== See also ==
- Frigates of the Royal New Zealand Navy
