= HMS Loch Killisport =

Frigate of the Royal Navy

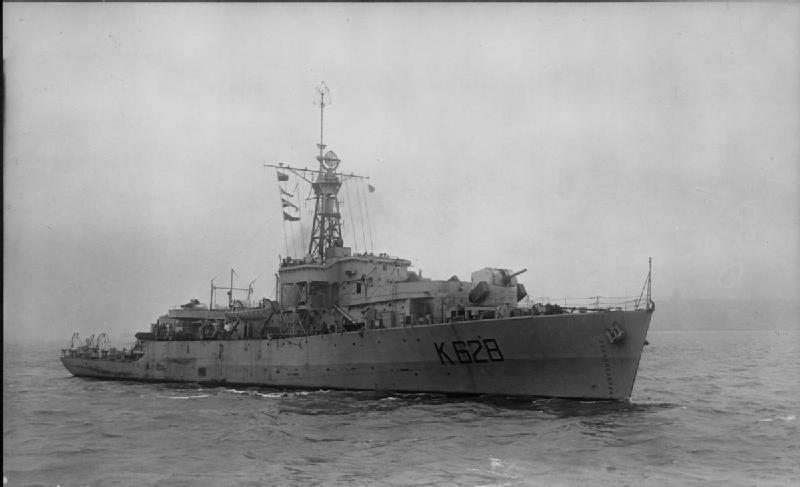
- Loch Killisport in July 1945

History

United Kingdom
- Name: HMS Loch Killisport
- Namesake: Loch Killisport
- Ordered: 2 February 1943
- Builder: Harland and Wolff, Belfast
- Yard number: 1248
- Laid down: 28 December 1943
- Launched: 6 July 1944
- Completed: 9 July 1945
- Commissioned: July 1945
- Decommissioned: April 1946
- Recommissioned: November 1950
- Decommissioned: April 1952
- Recommissioned: February 1955
- Decommissioned: August 1965
- Fate: Sold for scrapping, 20 February 1970

General characteristics
- Class & type: Loch-class frigate
- Displacement: 1,435 long tons (1,458 t)
- Length: 307 ft 9 in (93.80 m)
- Beam: 38 ft 9 in (11.81 m)
- Draught: 8 ft 9 in (2.67 m)
- Propulsion: 2 Admiralty 3-drum boilers; 2 shafts; 4-cylinder vertical triple expansion reciprocating engines, 5,500 hp (4,100 kW)
- Speed: 20 knots (37 km/h; 23 mph)
- Range: 9,500 nmi (17,600 km) at 12 kn (22 km/h; 14 mph)
- Complement: 114
- Armament: 1 × QF 4 inch Mark V on 1 single mounting HA Mk.III**; 4 × QF 2-pounder Mk.VII on 1 quad mount Mk.VII; 4 × 20 mm Oerlikon A/A on 2 twin mounts Mk.V (or 2 × 40 mm Bofors A/A on 2 single mounts Mk.III); Up to 8 × 20 mm Oerlikon A/A on single mounts Mk.III; 2 × Squid triple barrelled A/S mortars; 1 rail and 2 throwers for depth charges

HMS Loch Killisport (K628/F628) was a Loch-class frigate of the British Royal Navy, named after Loch Killisport (Scottish Gaelic: Caolisport) in Scotland. Launched in 1944, the ship was not commissioned until July 1945, and served in post-war repatriation operations in the Far East until decommissioned in April 1946. During this time Prince Philip was an officer on board this ship. Recommissioned in 1950 she served in the Home Fleet for two years, before being extensively modernised for service in the Persian Gulf and Far East. Decommissioned in August 1965, she was sold for scrapping in 1970.

== Service history ==
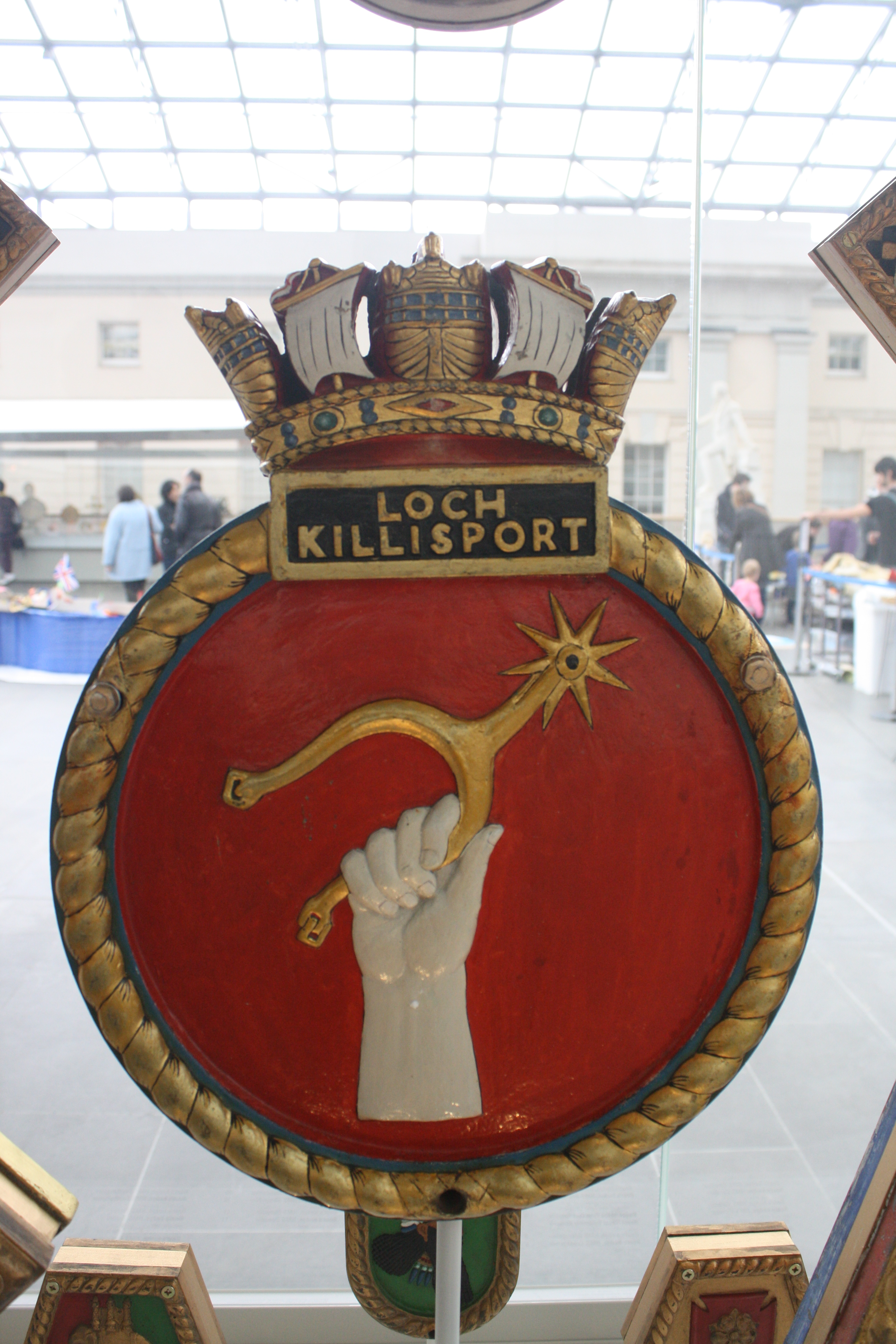
Ship's badge in the National Maritime Museum

=== Far East, 1945–1946 ===
After sea trials Loch Killisport was commissioned in July 1945, sailing for the Far East to serve with the Eastern Fleet in August. In September she sailed from Aden in convoy to Cochin, then to Colombo in October. Based at Singapore for escort duty and support of military operations in Java and Sumatra, she escorted vessels carrying former prisoners of war and civilian internees for repatriation. Prince Philip was an officer on board at that time. She returned to Britain in April 1946 to decommission and was laid-up in Reserve at Plymouth. In 1948 her pennant number was changed to F628.

=== Home Fleet, 1950–1952 ===
In July 1950 Loch Killisport was towed to HM Dockyard, Sheerness to refit, and was assigned to the 6th Frigate Flotilla, Home Fleet, in November. After anti-submarine training at Derry she joined the flotilla in February 1951 for exercises and visits. In April and May she took part in the search for the submarine HMS Affray lost in the English Channel. Further exercises and visits followed, around the UK and in the Mediterranean Sea, before she was decommissioned in April 1952. Loch Killisport remained in Reserve at Chatham until April 1953 when she was towed to Blackwall Yard, London for modernisation of her armament and electronics by Green and Silley Weir, which was not completed until June 1954. In September the ship sailed to HM Dockyard, Chatham, for further modifications for tropical service.

=== Gulf and Far East, 1955–1965 ===
==== Persian Gulf deployments ====
Commissioned in February 1955 she sailed for the Persian Gulf, arriving in May for patrol duties. Loch Killisport was sent to assist the Italian tanker MV Argea Prima which was on fire and abandoned in the Strait of Hormuz after a collision with the Dutch MV Tabian. Loch Killisport spent several days – along with USS Valcour – fighting the fires aboard. Eventually the ship was able to make Bahrain under her own power. The Queen's Commendation was awarded to Engineer Officer H. Ward, and to Chief Engineering Mechanic A. James. In August she sailed to Trincomalee to take part in CENTO "Exercise Jet 55" in the Indian Ocean, then visited Mauritius, the Seychelles, and Mombasa, before returning to the Persian Gulf. She was relieved by Loch Fada in January 1956, before returning to Portsmouth to refit.

She returned to the Persian Gulf in October 1956, via the Cape of Good Hope because of the closure of the Suez Canal. In mid-December she assisted the American tanker Olympic Games and the British tanker Athel Monarch, which were aground off Bahrain. Patrols in the Persian Gulf occupied most of 1957, though she also sailed to Cochin in April for joint exercises with the Indian Navy, and to Kharg Island for exercises with the Iranian Navy in June. In August she transited the Suez Canal, the first Royal Navy ship to do so after it re-opened, and returned to Chatham.

Loch Killisport returned to the Persian Gulf in February 1958, relieving Loch Fada at Muscat, Oman in April. In September she took part in the salvaging of the French tanker Fernand Gilabert which had collided with Liberian tanker Melika during heavy weather in the Gulf of Oman. After fires aboard Fernand Gilabert had been extinguished by Bulwark, the ship was towed to Karachi by Loch Killisport. The ship returned to Portsmouth in February 1959 to refit.

Loch Killisport returned to the Gulf in September for patrols and exercises, including the multi-national CENTO "Exercise Jet 59" at Cochin in December, "Exercise Winged Khanga" with HMS Centaur and Royal Fleet Auxiliaries in March 1960, and squadron exercises (CASPEX 5) with Loch Lomond in May. She returned to Rosyth in September to refit.

==== Far East deployments ====
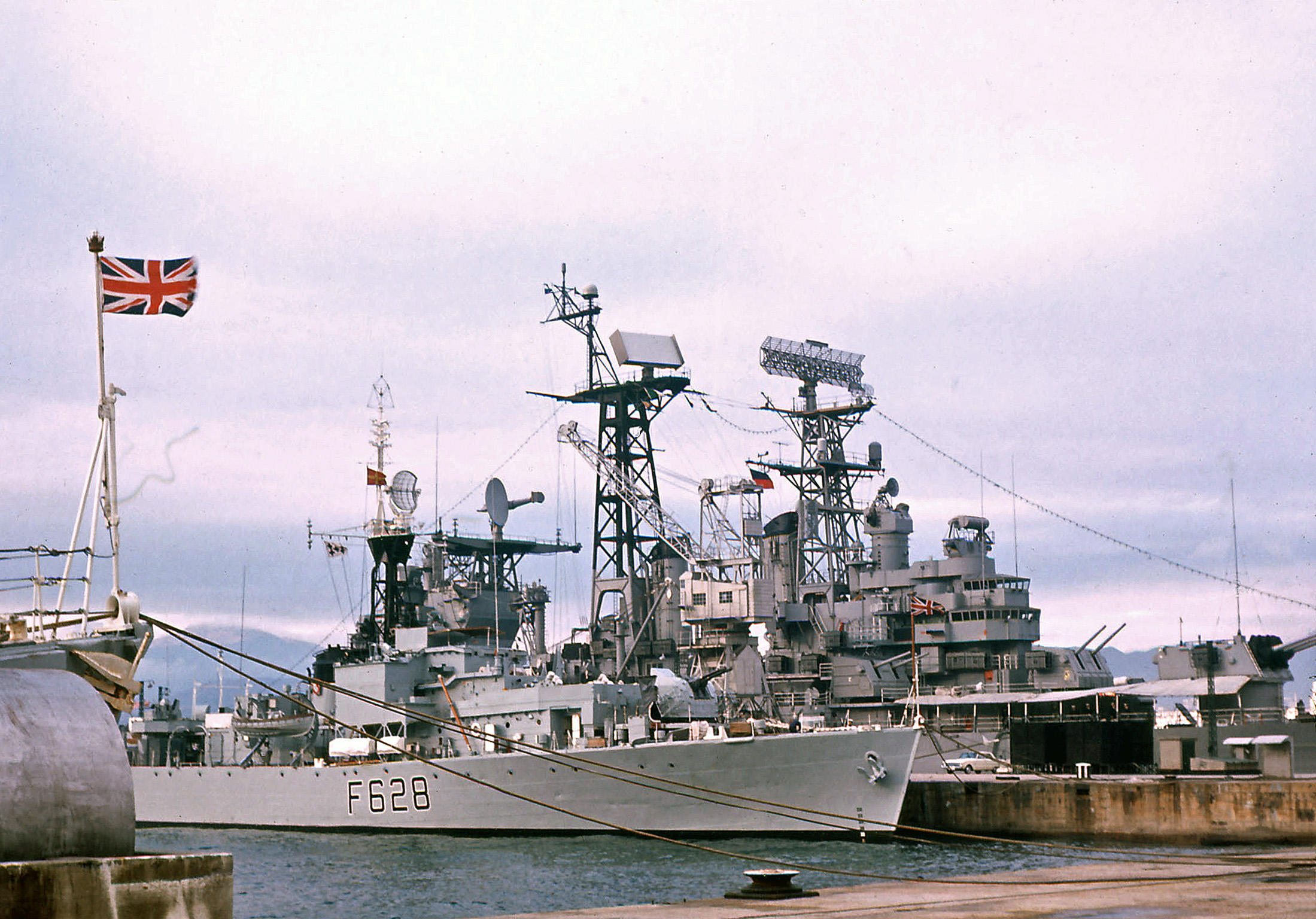
Loch Killisport at Hong Kong with USS Galveston, 25 January 1964

In September 1961 Loch Killisport was assigned to the 3rd Frigate Squadron, Far East Fleet, joining the squadron at Singapore in December. In February 1962 she carried out patrols and supported military operations in Borneo during the Indonesia–Malaysia confrontation (the Konfrontasi) while based at Tawau. In April she took part in the multi-national "Exercise Jet 62", and in June sailed to Japan for exercises with the United States Navy. In August she returned to Borneo for support and patrols based at Labuan. In September she sailed to Sydney to take part in "Exercise Tucker Box" with ships of the Royal Australian Navy, before visiting ports in New Zealand, and then calling at Suva in Fiji and the Gilbert and Ellice Islands. January 1963 saw her back at Sandakan, Borneo, for patrol and support duties, before returning to Singapore for a lengthy refit and to be joined by a new ship's company. Further support and patrol duties off Borneo followed from July 1963 through into most of the next year, with regular visits to Hong Kong and Singapore to refit and take part in Fleet exercises. She also held a two-day exercise with the Royal Thai Navy in April 1965, and visited Manila with HMS Whitby in June. In July she sailed for Britain, arriving back at Portsmouth to decommission on 4 August 1965.

=== Disposal ===
Loch Killisport was laid up in Reserve at Portsmouth. She was put on the Disposal List, and sold to the British Iron & Steel Corporation (BISCO) on 20 February 1970, for demolition by Hughes Bolckow. She arrived in tow at the breaker's yard in Blyth, Northumberland on 18 March.

== Bibliography ==
- Boniface, Patrick (2013). Loch Class Frigates. Maritime Books. ISBN 978-1-904459-54-5.
- Colledge, J. J.; Warlow, Ben (2006) [1969]. Ships of the Royal Navy: The Complete Record of All Fighting Ships of the Royal Navy from the 15th Century to the Present (3rd Rev ed.). London: Chatham Publishing. ISBN 978-1-86176-281-8. OCLC 67375475.
- Marriott, Leo, 1983. Royal Navy Frigates 1945–1983, Ian Allan Ltd. ISBN 07110 1322 5
- Service Histories of Royal Navy Warships in World War II : HMS Loch Killisport
