= HMS Loch Achray =

Frigate of the Royal Navy

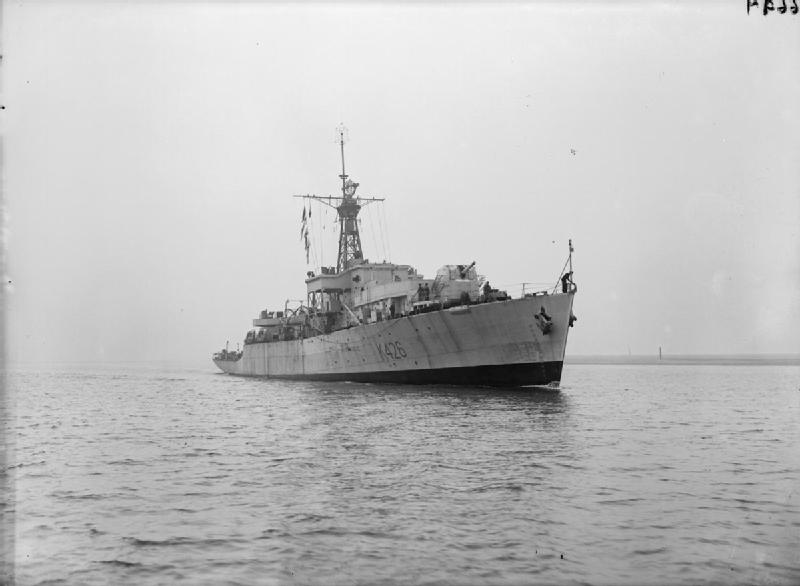
- HMS Loch Achray

History

United Kingdom
- Name: HMS Loch Achray
- Namesake: Loch Achray
- Ordered: 25 January 1943
- Builder: Smiths Dock Co., Ltd.
- Yard number: 1130
- Laid down: 13 December 1943
- Launched: 7 July 1944
- Commissioned: 1 February 1945
- Decommissioned: July 1946
- Identification: Pennant number K426
- Honours and awards: Atlantic, 1945
- Fate: Sold to Royal New Zealand Navy, 7 September 1948

New Zealand
- Name: HMNZS Kaniere
- Namesake: Lake Kaniere
- Acquired: 7 September 1948
- Commissioned: 27 September 1948
- Decommissioned: 1961
- Reclassified: Training ship, 1957
- Home port: Auckland
- Identification: pennant number F426
- Motto: Kia Maia; ("Be firm")
- Honours and awards: Korea, 1953
- Fate: Sold for scrapping, September 1966

General characteristics
- Class & type: Loch-class frigate
- Displacement: 1,435 long tons
- Length: 286 ft (87 m) p/p; 307 ft 3 in (93.65 m) o/a
- Beam: 38 ft 6 in (11.73 m)
- Draught: 8 ft 9 in (2.67 m) standard; 13 ft 3 in (4.04 m) full
- Propulsion: 2 × Admiralty 3-drum boilers; 2 shafts; 4-cylinder vertical triple expansion reciprocating engines, 5,500 hp (4,100 kW)
- Speed: 20 knots (37 km/h)
- Range: 9,500 nautical miles (17,590 km) at 12 kt, 730 tons oil fuel
- Complement: 114
- Armament: 1 × QF 4 inch Mark V on 1 single mounting HA Mk.III**; 4 × QF 2-pounder Mk.VII on 1 quad mount Mk.VII; 4 × 20 mm Oerlikon A/A on 2 twin mounts Mk.V; 8 × 20 mm Oerlikon A/A on single mounts Mk.III; 2 × Squid triple barrelled A/S mortars; One rail and two throwers for depth charges

HMS Loch Achray was a Loch-class frigate of the Royal Navy. She was built by Smith's Dock Co. Ltd. in South Bank-on-Tees and launched on 7 July 1944. After service in World War II, she was sold to the Royal New Zealand Navy and renamed HMNZS Kaniere (F426) in September 1948. After service in the Korean War, she was used as a training ship from 1957. She was sold in 1966 for breaking up in Hong Kong.

== HMS Loch Achray ==
After sea trials Loch Achray joined the 8th Escort Group in March 1945 for service in the Western Approaches. On 12 April, in the Irish Sea, the Group forced the German submarine U-1024 to the surface and engaged her with gunfire. The crew abandoned ship and the U-boat was taken in tow after being boarded, but sank the next day.

After the German surrender in May 1945 Loch Achray took part in "Operation Deadlight", escorting surrendered German U-boats from Scapa Flow to Loch Ryan.

In September 1945 Loch Achray joined the East Indies Escort Force in the Indian Ocean in supporting military operations and assisting with returning liberated prisoners of the Japanese to Singapore. The ship returned to Portsmouth in July 1946, and was placed in reserve. In 1948, she was part of a lot of six Loch-class frigates refitted and sold at a combined cost of £232,750 to New Zealand.

== HMNZS Kaniere ==
Kaniere was commissioned in Portsmouth, England on 27 September 1948, and arrived in Auckland, New Zealand in January 1949, joining the 11th Frigate Flotilla. Patrols and exercises occupied her until November 1951 when she was put in reserve.

Recommissioned in November 1952, she joined the United Nations Naval Task Group based at Sasebo, carrying out her first patrol along the west coast of Korea in April 1953. She remained there after the declaration of the cease-fire in August, finally returning to Auckland in April 1954. In September the warship joined the 3rd Frigate Squadron, Far East Fleet, based at Singapore, as part of the Commonwealth Strategic Reserve. She was detached to UN support duties off Korea, based at Sasebo, from October 1954 until May 1955, and returned to Auckland in July. After a refit she rejoined the 3rd Frigate Squadron in March 1956, once again being engaged in UN support duties from June to July.

From October 1956 until April 1957 Kaniere helped address the Malayan Emergency off Borneo, returning to Auckland in June to refit. Kaniere was then assigned as a training ship, taking part in exercises, training cruises and port visits.

On 17 November 1958, Kaniere towed the coaster Port Waikato, which had engine failure near the Chatham Islands, to Port Lyttelton.

On 3 August 1959 Kaniere collided with the ferry Makora in dense fog off Devonport.

The ship was decommissioned in 1961, and served as a harbour training ship until 1965. Kaniere was sold for scrapping in 1966.

== Decommissioning and fate ==
On 18 January 1967 Kaniere was paired with her sister ship Rotoiti and towed by the tug Daisy to Hong Kong for breaking up.

== Bibliography ==
- Colledge, J. J.; Warlow, Ben (2006) [1969]. Ships of the Royal Navy: The Complete Record of All Fighting Ships of the Royal Navy from the 15th Century to the Present (3rd Rev ed.). London: Chatham Publishing. ISBN 978-1-86176-281-8. OCLC 67375475.
- Boniface, Patrick (2013). Loch Class Frigates. Maritime Books. ISBN 978-1-904459-54-5.
