= HMS Loch Fyne =

Frigate of the Royal Navy

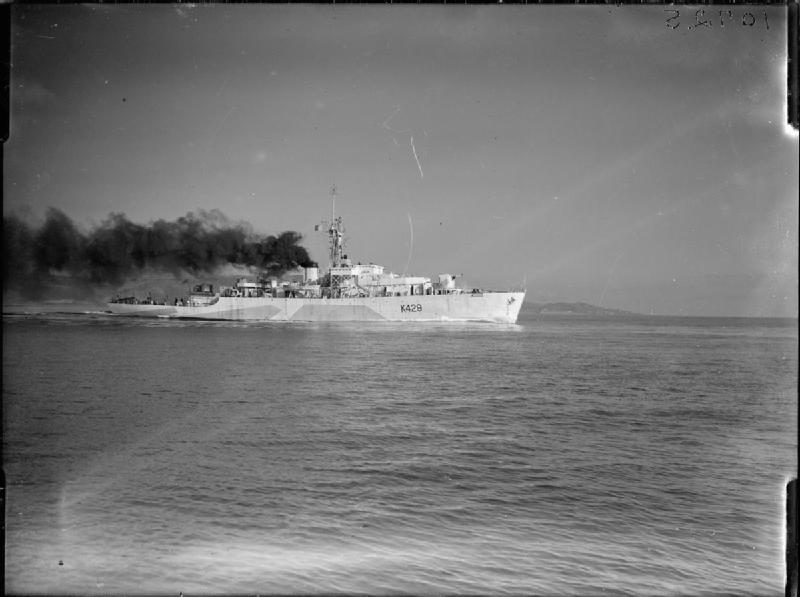
- Loch Fyne in October 1944

History

United Kingdom
- Name: HMS Loch Fyne
- Namesake: Loch Fyne
- Ordered: 2 February 1943
- Builder: Burntisland Shipbuilding Company
- Yard number: 284
- Laid down: 8 December 1943
- Launched: 24 May 1944
- Completed: 9 November 1944
- Commissioned: November 1944
- Decommissioned: April 1946
- Recommissioned: January 1951
- Decommissioned: March 1952
- Recommissioned: 14 February 1956
- Decommissioned: 6 May 1963
- Identification: Pennant number K429/F429
- Motto: Dion Na Mo Marbhshruth; ("I will leave safety in my wake")
- Honours and awards: Atlantic 1945
- Fate: Sold for scrapping, 1970

General characteristics
- Class & type: Loch-class frigate
- Displacement: 1,435 long tons
- Length: 286 ft (87 m) p/p; 307 ft 3 in (93.65 m) o/a
- Beam: 38 ft 6 in (11.73 m)
- Draught: 8 ft 9 in (2.67 m) standard; 13 ft 3 in (4.04 m) full
- Propulsion: 2 × Admiralty 3-drum boilers; 2 shafts; 4-cylinder vertical triple expansion reciprocating engines, 5,500 ihp (4,100 kW)
- Speed: 20 knots (37 km/h; 23 mph)
- Range: 9,500 nautical miles (17,590 km) at 12 kn (22 km/h; 14 mph), 730 tons oil fuel
- Complement: 114
- Armament: 1 × QF 4 inch Mark V on 1 single mounting HA Mk.III**; 4 × QF 2-pounder Mk.VII on 1 quad mount Mk.VII; 4 × 20 mm Oerlikon A/A on 2 twin mounts Mk.V (or 2 × 40 mm Bofors A/A on 2 single mounts Mk.III); Up to 8 × 20 mm Oerlikon A/A on single mounts Mk.III; 2 × Squid triple barreled A/S mortars; 1 rail and 2 throwers for depth charges

HMS Loch Fyne was a Loch-class frigate of the British Royal Navy, built by the Burntisland Shipbuilding Company Ltd, Burntisland, Fife, Scotland, and named after Loch Fyne in Scotland. The ship was launched in 1944, and served at the end of World War II. Recommissioned in 1951, she served in the Persian Gulf and was scrapped in 1970.

== Service history ==
=== World War II ===
Commissioned in November 1944, after sea trials and modifications Loch Fyne joined the 18th Escort Group on 22 December to support convoys on the UK–Gibraltar route. On 27 February 1945 the ship transferred to "Force 38" in the South-Western Approaches for anti-submarine patrols. On 9 April she transferred to Task Group 122.2, based at Portsmouth, to provide convoy support in the English Channel.

After the German surrender in May 1945, Loch Fyne was transferred to Scapa Flow to serve with the Home Fleet supporting the re-occupation of Norway, escorting captured U-boats from Trondheim to Loch Ryan as part of "Operation Deadlight". After a refit, in September 1945 she sailed for service with the East Indies Escort Force in the Indian Ocean, repatriating former prisoners of war and internees, and was deployed for Air-Sea Rescue duties while based at Trincomalee. The ship returned to Portsmouth in April 1946 and was decommissioned.

=== Home Fleet, 1951–1952 ===
Loch Fyne remained in reserve, and her pennant number was changed to F429 in 1948. Refitted in 1950, the ship was commissioned for service with the 6th Frigate Flotilla, Home Fleet, in January 1951. She sustained damage due to a premature depth charge explosion during sea trials, and so did not join the flotilla until April, to take part in the search for missing submarine HMS Affray. The Loch Fyne made the first contact with the Affray on her ASDIC equipment and sent the signal to the Admiralty in Whitehall. Exercises and visits occupied her until March 1952, when she was decommissioned for modernisation at Henderson's shipyard in Glasgow, and was then placed in reserve.

=== Persian Gulf, 1956–1963 ===
Loch Fyne was recommissioned on 14 February 1956 for service in Persian Gulf. In May she sailed from Plymouth, arriving at Bahrain in June. Patrolling in the southern Gulf and off the coast of Oman, in July she assisted the disabled Swedish tanker MV Julius. In October she patrolled the northern Persian Gulf and joined exercises with the Iranian Navy.

In January 1957 she assisted the Norwegian tanker Gilda which had run aground on the Iranian coast. In April she sailed from Aden to the Seychelles, then returned to the UK in June, via Mombasa, Freetown and Gibraltar. After a refit she returned to the Persian Gulf in December, and was deployed as a Guard ship at Shatt al-Arab during the Iranian revolution in July 1958. In December Loch Fyne and the cruiser Ceylon were at Aqaba when British troops withdrew from Jordan, and she then returned to Devonport to refit.

Loch Fyne returned to Bahrain in July 1959 for continuing duty in the Persian Gulf as part of the 9th Frigate Squadron, carrying out patrols and exercises. In January 1960 she sailed to Bombay for multi-national exercises in the Indian Ocean ("Exercise Jet"). She then returned to Devonport, arriving on 8 April.

After a refit she returned to the 9th Frigate Squadron at Bahrain on 23 December 1960. In January 1961 she sailed to Karachi for repairs to her sonar dome after anti-submarine exercises revealed it to be defective. She then patrolled the coasts of the Trucial States, Oman, and Aden, and took part in Fleet exercises. In April 1961 she went to assist the passenger ship Dara which was on fire after an explosion, but despite the best efforts of Loch Fyne and Loch Alvie, Dara foundered while under tow.

A routine docking at Karachi in June 1961 was cancelled, and ship quickly returned to the Persian Gulf to join Task Force 317 as part of "Operation Vantage" following threats to Kuwait's independence from Iraq. She eventually sailed to Karachi at the end of July before returning to the Gulf for further patrols off Kuwait until the end of August, when an international agreement made Kuwait's security the responsibility of the Arab League. In September she sailed for the East African coast to visit Zanzibar and Mombasa, before returning to the UK on 10 November.

On 19 May 1962 she sailed from Portsmouth, arriving at Bahrain on 18 June for exercises and port visits to Muscat, Abu Dhabi, Abu Musa and Tunb. In November after a routine docking at Karachi she took part in the multi-national CENTO exercise "Midlink V". The 1963 programme included the usual patrols and exercises in the southern Gulf, and visits to Dalma, Bombay, Al-Hallaniyah, Mombasa, and Tanga, before returning home in April, arriving at Devonport to decommission on 6 May 1963.

Loch Fyne was laid up in reserve at Devonport, and in 1964 was placed on the Disposal List. In 1970 she was sold for scrapping.

== Publications ==
- Boniface, Patrick (2013). Loch Class Frigates. Maritime Books. ISBN 978-1-904459-54-5.
- Colledge, J. J.; Warlow, Ben (2006) [1969]. Ships of the Royal Navy: The Complete Record of All Fighting Ships of the Royal Navy from the 15th Century to the Present (3rd Rev ed.). London: Chatham Publishing. ISBN 978-1-86176-281-8. OCLC 67375475.
- Marriott, Leo (1983). Royal Navy Frigates 1945–1983. Ian Allan Ltd. ISBN 0-71101-322-5.
