= HMS Loch Katrine =

Frigate of the Royal Navy

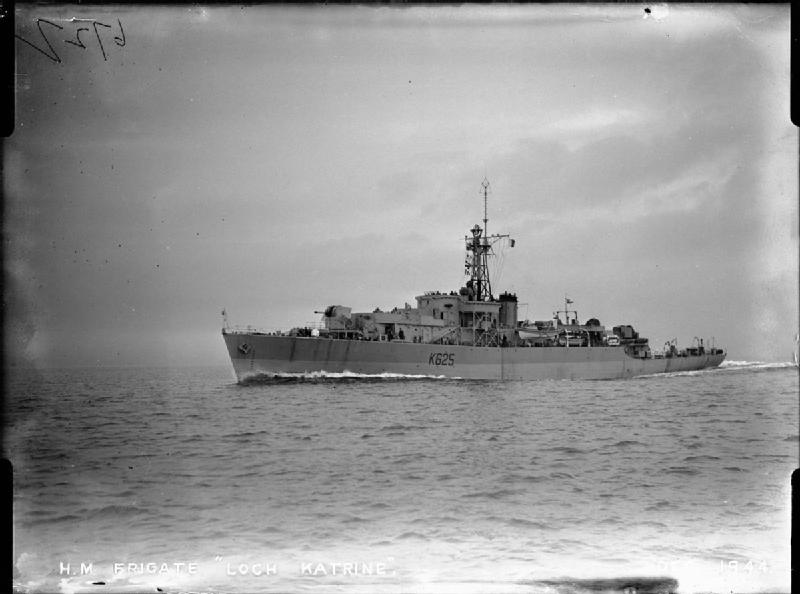
- Loch Katrine in December 1944

History

United Kingdom
- Name: HMS Loch Katrine
- Namesake: Loch Katrine
- Ordered: 25 January 1943
- Builder: Henry Robb, Leith
- Yard number: 347
- Laid down: 31 December 1943
- Launched: 21 August 1944
- Completed: 29 December 1944
- Commissioned: December 1944
- Decommissioned: May 1946
- Identification: Pennant number K625/F625
- Fate: Sold to New Zealand, 1948

New Zealand
- Name: HMNZS Rotoiti
- Acquired: 1948
- Commissioned: 7 May 1949
- Decommissioned: April 1953
- Recommissioned: February 1957
- Decommissioned: August 1965
- Identification: F625
- Fate: Sold for scrapping, 1966

General characteristics
- Class & type: Loch-class frigate
- Displacement: 1,435 long tons (1,458 t)
- Length: 307 ft 9 in (93.80 m)
- Beam: 38 ft 9 in (11.81 m)
- Draught: 8 ft 9 in (2.67 m)
- Propulsion: 2 Admiralty 3-drum boilers; 2 shafts; 4-cylinder vertical triple expansion reciprocating engines, 5,500 hp (4,100 kW)
- Speed: 20 knots (37 km/h; 23 mph)
- Range: 9,500 nmi (17,600 km) at 12 kn (22 km/h; 14 mph)
- Complement: 114
- Armament: 1 × QF 4 inch Mark V on 1 single mounting HA Mk.III**; 4 × QF 2-pounder Mk.VII on 1 quad mount Mk.VII; 4 × 20 mm Oerlikon A/A on 2 twin mounts Mk.V (or 2 × 40 mm Bofors A/A on 2 single mounts Mk.III); Up to 8 × 20 mm Oerlikon A/A on single mounts Mk.III; 2 × Squid triple barrelled A/S mortars; 1 rail and 2 throwers for depth charges

HMS Loch Katrine was a Loch-class frigate of the British Royal Navy, built by Henry Robb at Leith, Scotland, and named after Loch Katrine in Scotland. The ship was laid down on 31 December 1943, launched on 21 August 1944, and completed and commissioned in December 1944. The ship served in World War II as a convoy escort in the Atlantic, and afterwards in the Indian Ocean. Decommissioned in May 1946, the ship was sold to New Zealand in 1948, and renamed HMNZS Rotoiti (F625). The ship saw active service during the Korean War, and was finally sold for scrap in 1965.

== Service history ==
After sea trials Loch Katrine joined the 20th Escort Group based at Derry on 25 January 1945 and was deployed as escort for a Gibraltar convoy. On her return in February the ship was transferred to 24th Escort Group as the Senior Officer's ship for further Gibraltar convoys until the German surrender in May. The Group was then deployed in the North-Western Approaches to escort surrendering U-boats to Lisahally as part of "Operation Deadlight".

Loch Katrine returned to Derry to refit before departing in July with Loch Quoich to join the East Indies Escort Force. The ships arrived at Colombo on 4 August, and took part in preparations for planned landings in Malaya ("Operation Zipper"). On 7 September Loch Katrine was at Singapore for the formal surrender ceremonies. Local convoy escort duties and patrols occupied her until December, when she sailed to Batavia to support military operations in Dutch East Indies.

In 1946 she was deployed for convoy escort in the Malacca Strait and Bay of Bengal during repatriation operations, and carried out Air-Sea Rescue duty. In March she departed for the UK, arriving back at Portsmouth on 29 April to decommission, and was placed in Reserve. In 1947 her Pennant number was changed to F625.

Loch Katrine was sold to the Royal New Zealand Navy for £234,150 in 1948, and after refitting was commissioned into RNZN service at Portsmouth on 7 May 1949, and was renamed Rotoiti on 16 May.

== Bibliography ==
- Boniface, Patrick (2013). Loch Class Frigates. Maritime Books. ISBN 978-1-904459-54-5.
- Colledge, J. J.; Warlow, Ben (2006) [1969]. Ships of the Royal Navy: The Complete Record of All Fighting Ships of the Royal Navy from the 15th Century to the Present (3rd Rev ed.). London: Chatham Publishing. ISBN 978-1-86176-281-8. OCLC 67375475.
- Service Histories of Royal Navy Warships in World War II : HMS Loch Katrine
