= Loch-class frigate =

WWII-era Royal Navy warship

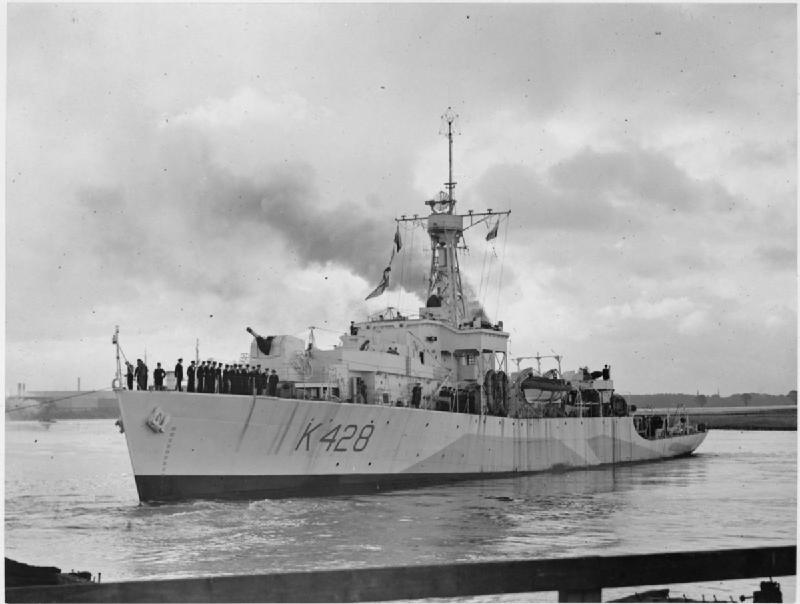
- HMS Loch Alvie

Class overview
- Name: Loch class
- Operators: Royal Navy; South African Navy; Royal Canadian Navy; Royal New Zealand Navy; Royal Malaysian Navy
- Preceded by: River class
- Succeeded by: Bay class
- Completed: 28
- Canceled: 54

General characteristics
- Type: Frigate
- Displacement: 1,435 long tons (1,458 t)
- Length: 307 ft 9 in (93.8 m)
- Beam: 38 ft 9 in (11.8 m)
- Draught: 8 ft 9 in (2.7 m)
- Installed power: 2 Admiralty 3-drum boilers; 5,500 ihp (4,100 kW) (steam engines) or; 6,500 shp (4,800 kW) (steam turbines)
- Propulsion: 2 shafts; 2 × vertical triple-expansion steam engines or; 2 × Parsons steam turbines
- Speed: 20 knots (37 km/h; 23 mph)
- Range: 9,500 nmi (17,600 km; 10,900 mi) at 12 knots (22 km/h; 14 mph)
- Complement: 114
- Sensors & processing systems: Types 144 and 147B ASDIC; Type 277 surface-search radar
- Armament: 1 × single QF 4-inch Mark V; 1 × quadruple QF 2-pounder; 2 × twin Oerlikon 20 millimetres (0.79 in) AA guns or 2 × single Bofors AA guns; 2–8 × single 20 mm Oerlikon AA guns; 2 × Squid triple-barrelled anti-submarine mortars; 1 rail and 2 throwers for 15 depth charges

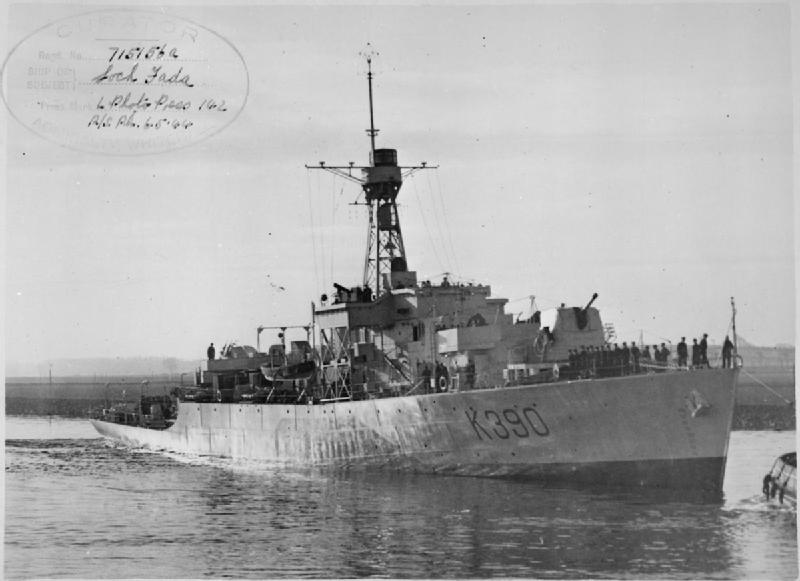
Anything but graceful: showing crude finish & boxy shape designed for war production, here is HMS Loch Fada in 1944.

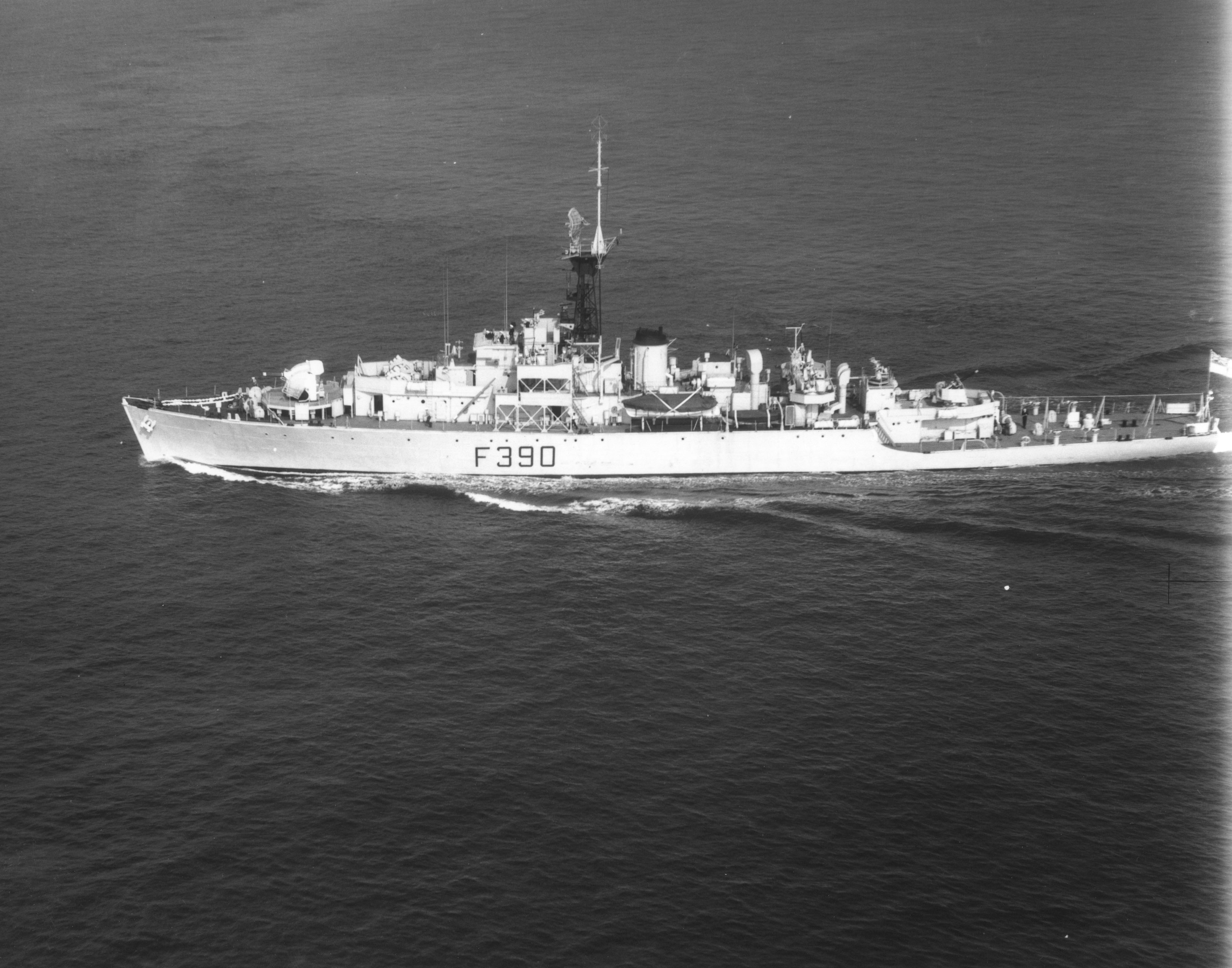
Loch Fada after 1953 modernisation

The Loch class was a class of anti-submarine (A/S) frigate built for the Royal Navy and her Allies during World War II. They were an innovative design based on the experience of three years of fighting in the Battle of the Atlantic and attendant technological advances. Some shipyards had trouble building these larger ships, which led to widespread use of the Castle-class corvette, introduced around the same time.

== Design ==
The Lochs were based upon the hull of the preceding River class with increased sheer and flare to improve seakeeping and modified to suit it to mass pre-fabrication, with sections riveted or welded together at the shipyard. Accordingly, as many curves as possible were eliminated, producing a noticeable kink in the main deck where the increased sheer forwards met the level abreast the bridge.

The fighting capability of the Loch class was a great jump forward, being based around the new Squid ahead-throwing A/S mortar. Previously, escorts had attacked with depth charges, requiring the attacking vessel to pass over the submerged submarine and drop warheads over the stern. The ahead-looking ASDIC (sonar) set lost contact at the vital moment before the weapons were launched, allowing a skilled submarine commander to take evasive action. Squid lobbed three 12 in (300 mm), 390 lb (180 kg) warheads up to 600 yd (550 m) ahead of the launching vessel falling in a triangular pattern with sides of 40 yd (37 m). As the clockwork fuses detonated the warheads at a depth determined by the ships' ASDIC set, the Squid attacked in full ASDIC contact giving greater accuracy and lethality. Two mortars were carried, with the bombs set to explode at different depths to create a convergent pressure wave to crush the hull of a submarine. The first successful "kill" was by Loch Killin on 31 July 1944, sinking the U-333. Such was the utility of Squid that depth charge carriage was reduced to only 15, with one rack and a pair of throwers being carried at the stern, resulting in a clear quarterdeck compared to the eight throwers, two racks and stowage for 100 plus charges in the Rivers.

The weapons outfit was completed with a QF 4 in (100 mm) Mark V gun forwards. An oversight in the River design had been to place the gun in the favourable position forward on the shelter deck, with the ahead throwing Hedgehog on the main deck, exposed to the worst of the seas breaking over the fo'c'sle, consequently this was reversed in the Lochs; the Squids being on the shelter deck behind protective bulwarks. For anti-aircraft (A/A) defence, a quadruple mounting Mark VII QF 2-pounder was shipped aft along with up to twelve 20 mm Oerlikon guns, in two twin powered mounts Mark V in the bridge wings and eight single pedestal mounts Mark III. Loch Arkaig, Loch Craggie, Loch Eck, Loch Glendhu, Loch Tralaig and the South African Navy ships HMSAS Good Hope, Natal and Transvaal carried single Bofors 40 mm L/60 gun mounts in lieu of the twin Oerlikons.

The Lochs carried Radar Type 277. This set used the cavity magnetron to transmit on centimetric wavelengths for target indication, excelling at picking out small targets such as a submarine periscope or snorkel from the surface clutter. The increased weight of the stabilised antenna array and the carriage of HF/DF at the masthead meant that a lattice mast was stepped in lieu of the traditional tripod or pole. Some vessels completed with Radar Type 271 or 272 and the associated "lantern" radome until Type 277 became available. ASDIC Type 144 was carried for search and attack functions with Type 147B used for depth finding.

As with the previous wartime escort designs, mercantile machinery was adopted to speed construction, with a pair of 4-cylinder vertical triple-expansion reciprocating engines. Loch Arkaig and Loch Tralaig were fitted with Parsons single reduction steam turbines to establish the feasibility of such an installation, but it was not possible to provide enough sets of turbines for all vessels. One advantage of the use of mercantile machinery was that it was instantly familiar to the mainly reservists and volunteers (RNRs and RNVRs) who crewed the ships.

== Service ==
Of the one hundred and ten vessels ordered, twenty-eight were built as frigates, entering service from 1944. Another two – Loch Assynt and Loch Torridon – were converted while building and completed as Coastal Forces Depot Ships, being renamed HMS Derby Haven and HMS Woodbridge Haven. Due to a need in 1944 for a version fitted as anti-aircraft vessels with the British Pacific Fleet, twenty-six units were authorised for completion to a modified design labelled the Bay-class frigate and were renamed. A further fifty-four Loch-class vessels were cancelled in 1945.

Of the twenty-eight Loch-class frigates completed as such, Loch Achanalt, Loch Alvie and Loch Morlich were transferred to Canada in 1943 but retained their Royal Navy names and were returned after the war; a fourth ship – Loch Fionn – was also earmarked for transfer but was retained by the Royal Navy as a Bay-class frigate. Loch Ard, Loch Boisdale and Loch Cree were transferred to South Africa as Transvaal, Good Hope and Natal respectively on completion. In 1948, six vessels, including two of the ex-Royal Canadian Navy trio, were refitted from reserve and transferred to New Zealand. During the Korean War, the Royal Navy reactivated several vessels and transferred them to the Mediterranean where they released Ch-class destroyers for war duties. In 1964 Loch Insh was transferred to Malaysia.

== Modifications ==
Loch Assynt and Loch Torridon were modified whilst under construction to depot ships for coastal forces, armed with a twin QF 4-inch (100 mm) Mark XVI on a single mounting Mark XIX forward and six single 20 mm Oerlikons. With the war in the Atlantic won by 1944, and a need forecast for additional fleet A/A escorts for the Royal Navy's increased Far Eastern commitments, twenty-six Loch class were redesigned and renamed (of which nineteen were completed) as Bay-class anti-aircraft frigates.

In 1953, seven vessels were modernised; Loch Alvie, Loch Fada, Loch Fyne, Loch Insh, Loch Killisport, Loch Lomond and Loch Ruthven. The single 4-inch (100 mm) gun was replaced by the ubiquitous twin 4-inch (100 mm) mounting HA/LA Mark XIX and the A/A weaponry was standardised as a single twin mounting Mark V and four single mounting Mark VII for the 40 mm Bofors gun, with a Simple Tachymetric Director shipped for the Mark V. Radar Type 277 was fitted with the new ANU antenna array. Loch Killisport sported a gunshield manufactured from GRP to test this material for suitability of constructing the housing of the new 4.5-inch gun Mark 8. Loch Fada paid off in 1967 and was used to test an early vertical launch variant of the new Sea Wolf missile.

== Completed ships ==
=== Royal Navy ===
1942 War Programme (4 ships):

Name	Pennant number	Builder	Ordered	Laid down	Launched	Completed	Fate
HMS Loch Achanalt (K424)	K424	Henry Robb Limited, Leith	24 July 1942	14 September 1942 as River-class frigate Naver, later changed to Loch class	23 September 1943	11 August 1944	Transferred to Royal Canadian Navy on completion, returned to Royal Navy on 20 June 1945. Transferred to Royal New Zealand Navy on 13 September 1948 as HMNZS Pukaki.
HMS Loch Fada (K390)	K390	John Brown & Company, Clydebank	19 January 1943	8 June 1943	14 December 1943	14 April 1944	Sold 21 May 1970 for breaking up at Faslane.
HMS Loch Dunvegan (K425)	K425	Charles Hill & Sons, Bristol	January 1943	29 September 1943	25 March 1944	30 June 1944	Broken up August 1960 at T. W. Ward, Briton Ferry.
HMS Loch Eck (K422)	K422	Smith's Dock, South Bank, M'borough	25 January 1943	25 October 1943	25 April 1944	7 November 1944	Transferred to Royal New Zealand Navy on 1 October 1948 as HMNZS Hawea. Sold in September 1965 for breaking up in Hong Kong.

1943 War Programme (26 completed including 2 modified as Coastal Forces Depot Ships):

- HMS Loch Achray (K426) – built by Smith's Dock, laid down 13 December 1943, launched 7 July 1944 and completed 1 February 1945. Transferred to Royal New Zealand Navy on 28 September 1948 as Kaniere.
- HMS Loch Alvie (K428) – built by Barclay Curle, laid down 31 August 1943, launched 14 April 1944 and completed 21 August 1944; transferred to Royal Canadian Navy on completion, returned to Royal Navy in 1945. Sold 18 January 1965 in Singapore for breaking up.
- HMS Loch Ard (K602) – built by Harland & Wolff, laid down 20 January 1944, launched 2 August 1944 and completed 21 May 1945; transferred to South African Navy on completion as SAS Transvaal.
- HMS Loch Arkaig (K603) – built by Caledon Shipbuilding, laid down 1 November 1944, launched 7 June 19445 and completed 17 November 1945.
- HMS Loch Assynt (K438) – built by Swan Hunter, laid down 11 February 1944, launched 14 December 1944 and completed 2 August 1945 as Coastal Forces depot ship Derby Haven. Sold to Iranian Navy in July 1949 as Babr.
- HMS Loch Boisdale (K432) – built by Blyth Dry Dock, laid down 8 November 1943, launched 5 July 1944 and completed 1 December 1944; transferred to South African Navy on completion as SAS Good Hope.
- HMS Loch Craggie (K609) – built by Harland & Wolff, laid down 28 December 1943, launched 23 May 1944 and completed 23 October 1944. Sold 8 July 1963 to break up at Lisbon.
- HMS Loch Cree (K430) – built by Swan Hunter, laid down 18 October 1943, launched 19 June 1944 and completed 8 March 1945; transferred to South African Navy on completion as SAS Natal.
- HMS Loch Fyne (K429) – built by Burntisland Shipbuilding, laid down 8 December 1943, launched 24 May 1944 and completed 9 November 1944. Sold 7 July 1970 to break up at Newport.
- HMS Loch Glendhu (K619) – built by Burntisland Shipbuilding, laid down 29 May 1944, launched 18 October 1944 and completed 23 February 1945. Broken up in November 1957 at Dunston.
- HMS Loch Gorm (K620) – built by Harland & Wolff, laid down 28 December 1943, launched 8 June 1944 and completed 18 December 1944. Sold in September 1961, becoming mercantile Orion.
- HMS Loch Insh (K433) – built by Henry Robb, laid down 17 November 1943, launched 10 May 1944 and completed 20 October 1944. Transferred to Malaysian Navy 2 October 1964 as Hang Tuah.
- HMS Loch Katrine (K625) – built by Henry Robb, laid down 31 December 1943, launched 21 August 1944 and completed 29 December 1944. Transferred to Royal New Zealand Navy in 1949 as Rotoiti.
- HMS Loch Killin (K391) – built by Burntisland Shipbuilding, laid down 22 June 1943, launched 29 November 1943 and completed 12 April 1944. Broken up in August 1960 at Newport.
- HMS Loch Killisport (K628) – built by Harland & Wolff, laid down 28 December 1943, launched 6 July 1944 and completed 9 July 1945. Sold 20 February 1970 to break up at Blyth.
- HMS Loch Lomond (K437) – built by Caledon Shipbuilding, laid down 7 December 1943, launched 19 June 1944 and completed 16 November 1944. Sold 6 September 1968 to break up at Faslane.
- HMS Loch More (K639) – built by Caledon Shipbuilding, laid down 16 March 1944, launched 3 October 1944 and completed 24 February 1945. Broken up in August 1963 at Inverkeithing.
- HMS Loch Morlich (K517) – built by Swan Hunter, laid down 15 July 1943, launched 25 January 1944 and completed 2 August 1944; transferred to Royal Canadian Navy on completion, returned to Royal Navy in 1945. Transferred to Royal New Zealand Navy on 11 April 1949 as Tutira.
- HMS Loch Quoich (K434) – built by Blyth Dry Dock, laid down 3 December 1943, launched 2 September 1944 and completed 11 January 1945. Broken up in November 1957 at Dunston.
- HMS Loch Ruthven (K645) – built by Charles Hill & Sons, laid down 4 January 1944, launched 3 June 1944 and completed 6 October 1944. Broken up in 1966 at Plymouth.
- HMS Loch Scavaig (K648) – built by Charles Hill & Sons, laid down 31 March 1944, launched 9 September 1944 and completed 22 December 1944. Broken up in September 1959 at Genoa.
- HMS Loch Shin (K421) – built by Swan Hunter, laid down 6 September 1943, launched 23 February 1944 and completed 10 October 1944. Transferred to Royal New Zealand Navy on 13 September 1948 as Taupo.
- HMS Loch Tarbert (K431) – built by Ailsa Shipbuilding, laid down 30 November 1943, launched 19 October 1944 and completed 22 February 1945. Broken up in September 1959 at Genoa.
- HMS Loch Torridon (K654) – built by Swan Hunter, launched 13 January 1945 and completed 19 October 1945 as Coastal Forces depot ship HMS Woodbridge Haven. Broken up August 1965 at Blyth.
- HMS Loch Tralaig (K655) – built by Caledon Shipbuilding, laid down 26 June 1944, launched 12 February 1945 and completed 4 July 1945. Broken up in August 1963 at Bo'ness.
- HMS Loch Veyatie (K658) – built by Ailsa Shipbuilding, laid down 30 March 1944, launched 8 October 1945 and completed 13 July 1946. Broken up in August 1965 at Dalmuir.

== Transferred ships ==
=== Royal Canadian Navy ===
- HMCS Loch Achanalt (K424)
- HMCS Loch Alvie (K428)
- HMCS Loch Morlich (K517)

All three were returned to the Royal Navy in 1945.

=== South African Navy ===
- HMSAS Good Hope (K 432) (ex- HMS Loch Boisdale). Scuttled as an artificial reef in False Bay, 12 December 1978.
- HMSAS Natal (K 10) (ex- HMS Loch Cree). Survey ship 1957. Sunk as a target off the Cape, 19 September 1972.
- HMSAS Transvaal (K 602) (ex- HMS Loch Ard). Scuttled as an artificial reef in False Bay, 3 August 1978.

=== Royal New Zealand Navy ===
- HMNZS Pukaki (ex- HMS Loch Achanalt). Broken up in January 1966 at Hong Kong.
- HMNZS Kaniere (ex- HMS Loch Achray). Sold in 1966 for breaking up at Hong Kong.
- HMNZS Rotoiti (ex- HMS Loch Katrine). Sold in November 1966 for breaking up at Hong Kong.
- HMNZS Hawea (ex- HMS Loch Eck). Sold in September 1965 for breaking up in Hong Kong.
- HMNZS Taupo (ex- HMS Loch Shin). Sold 15 December 1961 for breaking up.
- HMNZS Tutira (ex- HMS Loch Morlich). Sold 15 December 1961 for breaking up.

Ex-Royal Navy vessels, transferred from 1948.

=== Royal Malaysian Navy ===
- Hang Tuah (ex- HMS Loch Insh). Retired and scrapped in 1977.

== Cancelled 54 ships (Royal Navy) ==
- HMS Loch Affric (K 601) from Ailsa Shipbuilding, Troon.
- HMS Loch Clunie (K 607) from Ailsa Shipbuilding, Troon.
- HMS Loch Ericht (K 612) from Ailsa Shipbuilding, Troon.
- HMS Loch Erisort (K 613) from Barclay Curle, Glasgow.
- HMS Loch Garve (K 617) from Hall Russell.
- HMS Loch Griam (K 621) from Swan Hunter.
- HMS Loch Harray (K 623) from Smith's Dock.
- HMS Loch Ken (K 626) from Smith's Dock.
- HMS Loch Kirbister (K 629) from Swan Hunter.
- HMS Loch Linfern (K 631) from Smith's Dock.
- HMS Loch Linnhe (K 632) from William Pickersgill.
- HMS Loch Lyon (K 635) from Swan Hunter.
- HMS Loch Minnick (K 637) from Smith's Dock.
- HMS Loch Nell (K 641) from Henry Robb.
- HMS Loch Odairn (K 642) from Henry Robb.
- HMS Loch Ossian (K 643) from Smith's Dock.
- HMS Loch Ryan (K 646) from William Pickersgill.
- HMS Loch Scrivain (K 649) from William Pickersgill.
- HMS Loch Tanna (K 652) from Blyth Dry Dock.
- HMS Loch Tilt (K 653) from William Pickersgill.
- HMS Loch Urgill (K 656) from Blyth Dry Dock.
- HMS Loch Vennacher (K 657) from Blyth Dry Dock.
- HMS Loch Watten (K 659) from Blyth Dry Dock.
- HMS Loch Awe from Harland & Wolff.
- HMS Loch Badcall from William Pickersgill.
- HMS Loch Caroy from William Pickersgill.
- HMS Loch Doine from Smith's Dock.
- HMS Loch Creran from Smith's Dock.
- HMS Loch Earn from Charles Hill & Sons.
- HMS Loch Enoch from Harland & Wolff.
- HMS Loch Eye from Harland & Wolff.
- HMS Loch Eyenort from Harland & Wolff.
- HMS Loch Glashan from Smith's Dock.
- HMS Loch Goil from Harland & Wolff.
- HMS Loch Hourn from Harland & Wolff.
- HMS Loch Inchard from Harland & Wolff.
- HMS Loch Kirkaig from Harland & Wolff.
- HMS Loch Kishorn from Henry Robb.
- HMS Loch Knochie from William Pickersgill.
- HMS Loch Laro from Harland & Wolff.
- HMS Loch Lurgan from Harland & Wolff.
- HMS Loch Maberry from Hall Russell.
- HMS Loch Ronald from Harland & Wolff.
- HMS Loch Sheallah from Harland & Wolff.
- HMS Loch Shiel from Harland & Wolff.
- HMS Loch Skaig from Smith's Dock.
- HMS Loch Skerrow from Charles Hill & Sons.
- HMS Loch Stemster from Harland & Wolff.
- HMS Loch Stenness from Smith's Dock.
- HMS Loch Striven from Harland & Wolff.
- HMS Loch Sunart from Harland & Wolff.
- HMS Loch Swin from Harland & Wolff.
- HMS Loch Tummell from Harland & Wolff.
- HMS Loch Vanavie from Harland & Wolff.

== See also ==
- Bay-class frigate – Loch-class ships converted to anti-aircraft frigates

Equivalent frigates of the same era

- Bergamini class
- Azopardo class
- Petya class
- Roofdier class

== Bibliography ==
- Colledge, J. J.; Warlow, Ben (2006) [1969]. Ships of the Royal Navy: The Complete Record of All Fighting Ships of the Royal Navy from the 15th Century to the Present (3rd Rev ed.). London: Chatham Publishing. ISBN 978-1-86176-281-8. OCLC 67375475.
- British and Empire Warships of the Second World War, H T Lenton, Greenhill Books, ISBN 1-85367-277-7
- Royal Navy Frigates 1945–1983, Leo Marriott, Ian Allan, 1983, ISBN 0-7110-1322-5
- Uboat.net article on Loch class frigates
