= HMS Woodbridge Haven =

Royal Navy depot ship

History

United Kingdom
- Name: HMS Woodbridge Haven (K.654); HMS Loch Torridon
- Ordered: 13 February 1943
- Builder: Swan Hunter & Wigham Richard
- Yard number: 1790
- Laid down: 2 May 1944
- Launched: 13 January 1945
- Commissioned: 10 October 1945
- Decommissioned: 11 July 1963
- Nickname(s): Woo Ha
- Fate: Scrapped 1965

General characteristics
- Class & type: Converted Loch-class frigate
- Type: Depot ship
- Displacement: 1,650 tons
- Length: 307.3 ft (93.7 m)
- Beam: 38.5 ft (11.7 m)
- Draught: 12.8 ft (3.9 m)
- Speed: 19.5 knots
- Complement: 103
- Armament: 1 × 4-inch gun; 6 × 20-mm AA gun

HMS Woodbridge Haven (K.654) was a Royal Navy Coastal Forces depot ship built in 1945. Originally designed as a Loch-class anti-submarine frigate, the ship was converted to be an auxiliary for the Coastal Forces after the end of World War II. Woodbridge Haven displaced 1,650 tons, measuring 307 ft (94 m) long, 38.5 ft (11.7 m) wide, and with a draft of 13 ft (4.0 m). It had two diesel engines which provided 5,500 HP to two screw propellers, allowing for a speed of 19.5 knots. The ship was armed with a single 4-inch gun and six 20mm anti-aircraft guns. It was manned by a complement of 103 crew.

== History ==
The ship was originally intended to be named HMS Loch Torridon in keeping with the naming scheme of the Loch-class frigates. It was launched as an anti-submarine frigate in January 1945, but by that point the Royal Navy had no need for further ships in the Loch-class. As such, the ship was converted into a depot ship for service in the Far East with the Coastal Forces. However, because of the further construction time needed for the conversion, the ship was not commissioned until after VJ Day, and was again no longer needed. Just a month after commissioning as HMS Woodbridge Haven in October 1945, the ship was placed into reserve at Harwich.

Woodbridge Haven, nicknamed Woo Ha by its crew, was accepted into service in early 1946 as a submarine target ship with the 5th Submarine Flotilla at Rothesay. The ship remained in this role until 1955, when it was refitted yet again as a headquarters ship for minesweeping operations in Malta. It took part in minesweeping missions in the Suez Canal as part of the Suez Crisis in 1956, and was then transferred to Singapore in 1959. In 1963, Woodbridge Haven was relieved of its duties by HMS Manxman and was decommissioned. The ship was sold for scrap and was towed to Blythe to be broken up in August 1965.
