= Alvie =

Coordinates: 57.160°N 3.880°W

Alvie: Scottish Gaelic: Albhaidh
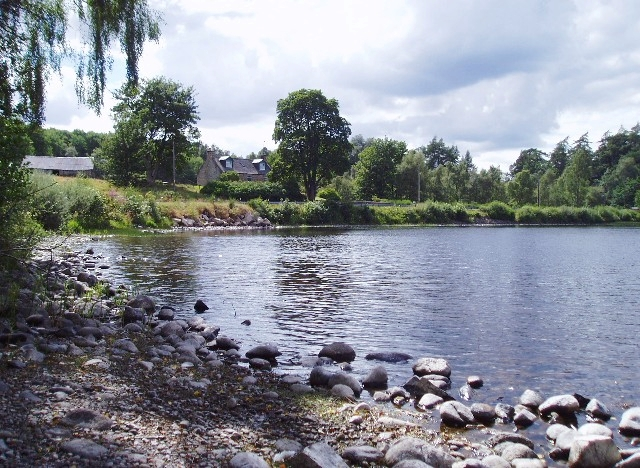
- Loch Alvie

- Location within the Badenoch and Strathspey area
- Population: 443 (2001)
- OS grid reference: NH8609
- Council area: Highland
- Lieutenancy area: Inverness
- Country: Scotland
- Sovereign state: United Kingdom
- Post town: AVIEMORE
- Postcode district: PH22
- Dialling code: 01479
- Police: Scotland
- Fire: Scottish
- Ambulance: Scottish
- UK Parliament: Moray West, Nairn and Strathspey
- Scottish Parliament: Skye, Lochaber and Badenoch

Alvie (Scottish Gaelic: Albhaidh) is a small crofting hamlet on the south shore of Loch Alvie in the Badenoch and Strathspey area of Inverness-shire, within the Scottish council area of Highland. It is also the name of a working Scottish Highland estate and a civil parish.

Alvie sits in Cairngorm National Park and is part of the Alvie and Dalraddy estates, which extend into the Monadhliath hills from the River Spey and are overlooked by the Cairngorms.

== History ==
For nearly 400 years, Alvie fell within the Lordship of Badenoch held by the Dukes of Gordon. In the early nineteenth century it was owned by the Macpherson-Grants of Ballindalloch. In 1862 the property was in the ownership of James Evan Baillie, the predecessor of Lord Burton of Dochfour. By 1867 the estate was purchased or tenanted by Sir John Ramsden, an industrialist from northern England who planted up around 2,000 acres (810 ha) of what was described as moorland to forestry for timber production. He later moved to Ardverikie Estate, which his descendants still own.

In 1905 Alvie was purchased by Sir Robert Boville (Bertie) Whitehead who owned Alvie until 1923. Sir Robert was the grandson of Robert Whitehead who invented the torpedo. The Whitehead family married into some of the most influential families in Europe. Bertie's cousin Marguerite married Herbert von Bismarck, son of the German chancellor Otto von Bismarck, whilst another cousin, Agathe Whitehead, married the Austrian Georg von Trapp.

Robert Whitehead deer fenced much of the Estate and invested large sums in extending Alvie House and improving the stock of red deer. The remains of the deer fence erected around 1908 can still be seen.

The Estate was sold in 1923 to Lady Carnarvon shortly after the death of her husband, Lord Carnarvon, who discovered the tomb of Tutankhamun in Egypt. Lady Carnarvon set up Balchurn (Home Farm) as a model dairy farm, which remained active into the 1950s.

Alexander Williamson bought the Alvie Estate from Lady Carnarvon in 1927, primarily for its field sports, and the Dalraddy Estate in 1929. The family also had land holdings in Angus. Around the time of Alexander Williamson's death in 1930 the Estates were put into a limited liability company Alvie Estate Ltd. His nephew Gerald Williamson managed the Estates for his widow until her death in 1956. He organised the replanting of most of the woodland areas felled during the two world wars. He purchased Invereshie Farm in 1957 and later Blackmill, Balnespick and part of Ballintean Farms at the bottom end of Glenfeshie. These farms are now owned and farmed by his youngest daughter Jane Williamson. Gerald Williamson died in 1966.

In 1966 Gerald's son Fergus Williamson transferred the Estates out of Alvie Estate Ltd. and into his ownership following advice that any sale of the assets would result in double taxation. In January 1972 Alvie and Dalraddy Estates were transferred into a Discretionary Trust but retaining Alvie House and policies in the ownership of Fergus Williamson. The beneficiaries were his children and grandchildren.

Fergus Williamson was part of a consortium which invested in downhill skiing in the Cairngorms. He helped build Glenfeshie gliding club on land now owned by Jane Williamson and in 1968 opened Dalraddy Caravan Park (now Dalraddy Holiday Park). He also turned parts of Alvie House into self catering holiday accommodation and rented out the grouse shooting and deer stalking on a commercial basis.

In 1983 Dalraddy Estate was transferred into the ownership of Jamie Williamson, the eldest son of Fergus Williamson. Alvie Farm was transferred into a limited partnership with Jamie Williamson being the general partner and Alvie Trust the limited partner. Following the death of Fergus Williamson in 1987 the widow of Fergus transferred ownership of Alvie House and policies to their eldest son Jamie Williamson in 1991.

The estate was used for the 2017-8 filming of the documentary/reality programme Churchill's Secret Agents: The New Recruits.
