= HMS Loch Morlich =

Frigate of the Royal Navy

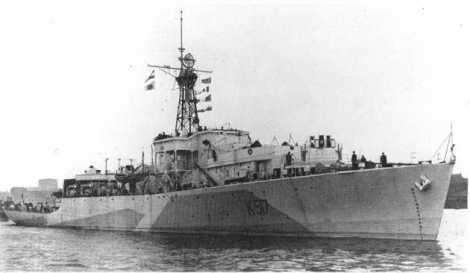
- HMCS Loch Morlich (K517)

History

United Kingdom
- Name: Loch Morlich
- Namesake: Loch Morlich
- Operator: Royal Navy
- Ordered: 13 February 1943
- Builder: Swan Hunter
- Laid down: 15 July 1943
- Launched: 25 January 1944
- Identification: Pennant number: K 517
- Fate: Transferred to Royal Canadian Navy on completion. Returned 1945 and reduced to reserve fleet 1945, Sold to New Zealand 1948

Canada
- Name: Loch Morlich
- Operator: Royal Canadian Navy
- Commissioned: 17 July 1944
- Decommissioned: 20 June 1945
- Identification: pennant number: K 517
- Fate: Returned to United Kingdom 1945

New Zealand
- Name: Tutira
- Namesake: Lake Tūtira
- Operator: Royal New Zealand Navy
- Acquired: April 1949
- Commissioned: 19 April 1949
- Decommissioned: September 1951
- Identification: Pennant number: F 517
- Honours and awards: Korea 1950–51
- Fate: Scrapped 1966

General characteristics
- Class & type: Loch-class frigate
- Displacement: 1,435 tons
- Length: 307 ft 9 in (93.80 m)
- Beam: 38 ft 9 in (11.81 m)
- Draught: 8 ft 9 in (2.67 m)
- Propulsion: 2 Admiralty 3-drum boilers, 2 shafts; 4-cylinder vertical triple-expansion reciprocating engines, 5,500 hp (4,100 kW), or; Parsons single reduction geared turbines, 6,500 shp (4,800 kW)
- Speed: 20 knots (37 km/h)
- Range: 9,500 nautical miles (17,600 km) at 12 knots (22 km/h)
- Complement: 114
- Armament: 1 × QF 4-inch Mark V on 1 single mounting HA Mk.III**; 4 × QF 2 pounder Mk.VII on 1 quad mount Mk.VII; 4 × 20 mm Oerlikon A/A on 2 twin mounts Mk.V (or 2 × 40 mm Bofors A/A on 2 single mounts Mk.III); Up to 8 × 20 mm Oerlikon A/A on single mounts Mk.III; 2 × Squid triple-barrelled A/S mortars; 1 rail and 2 throwers for depth charges

HMS Loch Morlich was a Loch-class frigate that never saw service with the Royal Navy. Ordered during World War II, she saw service instead with the Royal Canadian Navy in the Battle of the Atlantic. She was named for Loch Morlich in Scotland. After the war she was returned to the Royal Navy and she was sold to the Royal New Zealand Navy and renamed HMNZS Tutira.

Loch Morlich which was ordered from Swan Hunter on 13 February 1943. She was laid down 15 July 1943 and launched 25 January 1944. Upon completion she was transferred to the Royal Canadian Navy and commissioned on 17 July 1944, at Wallsend-on-Tyne.

== War service ==
After commissioning Loch Morlich joined convoy escort group EG 6 based in Derry after working up at Tobermory. She patrolled the waters around the United Kingdom until April 1945 when the group was transferred across the Atlantic to Halifax. She remained on the Canadian side of the Atlantic until the end of May when she returned to the United Kingdom. She was decommissioned and returned to the United Kingdom 20 June 1945 at Sheerness alongside HMCS Loch Achanalt, another Loch-class loaner to the Royal Canadian Navy. She was reduced to reserve status and laid up in Sheerness, eventually being sold with six other Loch-class frigates in 1948.

== Postwar service ==
Loch Morlich was transferred to the Royal New Zealand Navy on 1 April 1949. Renamed Tutira, she was commissioned into the Royal New Zealand Navy on 19 April 1949. In 1950, along with HMNZS Pukaki, she sailed for Korea, taking part in the United Nations naval blockade during the Korean War, serving mainly as an escort. She took part in the Battle of Inchon serving as part of the screening force. After returning from Korean waters she was placed in reserve in September 1951. She sat laid up in Auckland from 1952 until sold for scrap in 1961 and was broken up in 1966 at Hong Kong.

== See also ==
- Frigates of the Royal New Zealand Navy
- List of current ships of the Royal Canadian Navy
