= Loch Alvie =

Lake in Scotland

Coordinates: 57°9′47.42″N 3°52′30.38″W

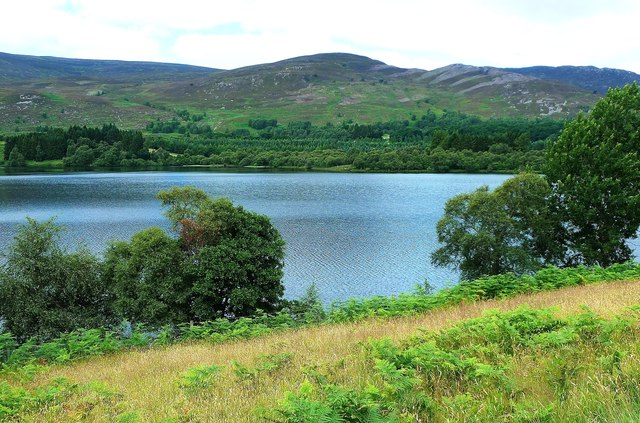
Loch Alvie view

Loch Alvie is a loch located north of the River Spey, in the civil parish of Alvie, in the council area of Highland, Scotland. The loch is about two miles southwest of Aviemore. HMS Loch Alvie, launched in 1944, is named after the loch.
