= HMS Loch Lomond =

Frigate of the Royal Navy

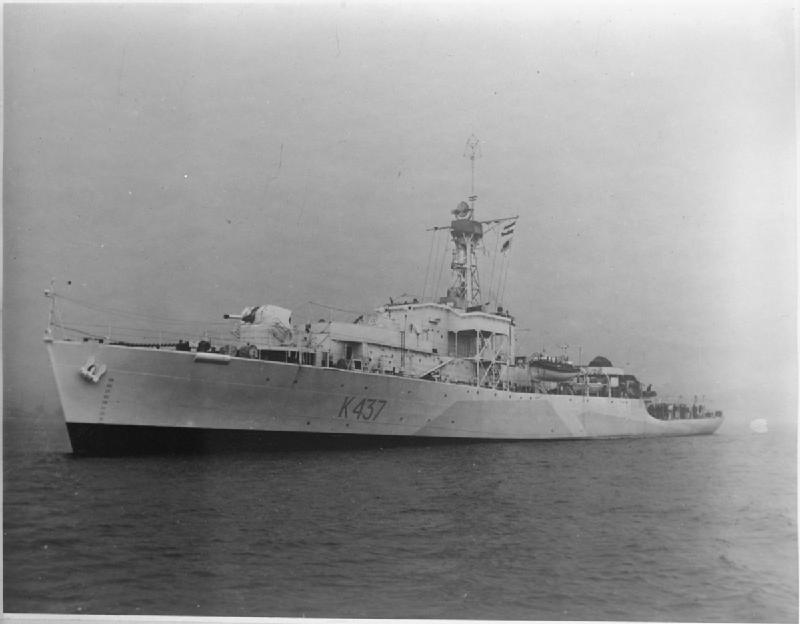
- Loch Lomond in October 1944

History

United Kingdom
- Name: HMS Loch Lomond
- Namesake: Loch Lomond
- Ordered: 2 February 1943
- Builder: Caledon Shipbuilding & Engineering Company, Dundee, Scotland
- Laid down: 7 December 1943
- Launched: 19 June 1944
- Completed: 16 November 1944
- Commissioned: November 1944
- Decommissioned: April 1946
- Recommissioned: 22 September 1950
- Decommissioned: 19 December 1964
- Stricken: February 1965
- Identification: Pennant number K437/F437
- Motto: Si je puis; ("If I can")
- Fate: Sold for scrap, 1968

General characteristics
- Class & type: Loch-class frigate
- Displacement: 1,435 long tons (1,458 t)
- Length: 307 ft 9 in (93.80 m)
- Beam: 38 ft 9 in (11.81 m)
- Draught: 8 ft 9 in (2.67 m)
- Propulsion: 2 × Admiralty 3-drum boilers; 2 shafts; 4-cylinder vertical triple expansion reciprocating engines, 5,500 ihp (4,100 kW)
- Speed: 20 knots (37 km/h)
- Range: 9,500 nautical miles (17,600 km) at 12 knots (22 km/h)
- Complement: 114
- Armament: 1 × QF 4 inch Mark V on 1 single mounting HA Mk.III**; 4 × QF 2-pounder Mk.VII on 1 quad mount Mk.VII; 4 × 20 mm Oerlikon A/A on 2 twin mounts Mk.V (or 2 × 40 mm Bofors A/A on 2 single mounts Mk.III); Up to 8 × 20 mm Oerlikon A/A on single mounts Mk.III; 2 × Squid triple barreled A/S mortars; 1 rail and 2 throwers for depth charges

HMS Loch Lomond was a Loch-class frigate of the British Royal Navy. The ship was named after Loch Lomond in Scotland.

The ship was ordered from Caledon Shipbuilding & Engineering Company, Dundee, Scotland on 2 February 1943, and laid down on 7 December 1943. Launched on 19 June 1944, and completed on 16 November 1944, the ship was commissioned soon after.

== Service history ==
=== World War II ===
Attached to the 17th Escort Group from 11 December 1944, until May 1945 the ship patrolled the waters off Scotland and Northern Ireland, and in the English Channel escorting convoys. After V-E Day the ship was nominated for service in East Indies. After modifications she sailed on 28 June for Ceylon. In August she was set to take part in "Operation Zipper", the recapture of British Malaya, though this was cancelled after the surrender of Japan. She remained at Singapore, supporting local operations until returning to the UK in April 1946 to be decommissioned.

While in reserve in 1948 her pennant number was changed to F437.

=== 1950-1959 ===
Loch Lomond was recommissioned on 22 September 1950 and served in the Mediterranean Fleet based at Malta, also seeing service in the Red Sea. She returned to the UK and was decommissioned on 21 October 1952.

She underwent modernisation between 1953 and 1955 before being recommissioned on 19 April 1955, returning to the Mediterranean Fleet, also seeing service in the Persian Gulf and as part of the East Coast of India Patrol. She returned to the UK in April 1956 to refit, sailing on 14 November for the Persian Gulf via the Cape of Good Hope, because of the closure of the Suez Canal. Duties in the Gulf and Indian Ocean occupied her until her return to the UK on 12 November 1957. Another major refit took up 1958 and most of 1959, before Loch Lomond was recommissioned in September.

=== 1960-1968 ===
Loch Lomond returned to the Persian Gulf in February 1960 for further patrols and exercises. The ship returned to the UK on 26 January 1961. In July she joined the 9th Frigate Squadron, returning to the Gulf in November. She then sailed to Singapore and joined the 3rd Frigate Squadron of the Far East Fleet on 18 October 1962.

In March 1963 she supported military operations in the Indonesia–Malaysia confrontation, the Konfrontasi, then served as Guard ship at Gan in the Maldives. Mr Abdulla Afeef Didi, the rebel leader of the Maldives and his family were transported to the British colony of Seychelles on Sunday, 29 September 1963 on board HMS Loch Lomond, reaching the destination on Friday, 4 October 1963. Exercises and patrol duties in the Indian Ocean and South China Sea occupied her until her return to the UK on 19 December 1964 for decommissioning.

Placed on the Disposal List in February 1965 she remained at Portsmouth until 1967 when she was taken to Chatham to be stripped of equipment before being sold for scrap in 1968.

== Bibliography ==
- Boniface, Patrick (2013). Loch Class Frigates. Maritime Books. ISBN 978-1-904459-54-5.
- Colledge, J. J.; Warlow, Ben (2006) [1969]. Ships of the Royal Navy: The Complete Record of All Fighting Ships of the Royal Navy from the 15th Century to the Present (3rd Rev ed.). London: Chatham Publishing. ISBN 978-1-86176-281-8. OCLC 67375475.
- Marriott, Leo (1983). Royal Navy Frigates 1945–1983. Ian Allan Ltd. ISBN 0-71101-322-5.
