= Loch Fada (Colonsay) =

Lake in The Hebrides, Scotland

- Long Lake
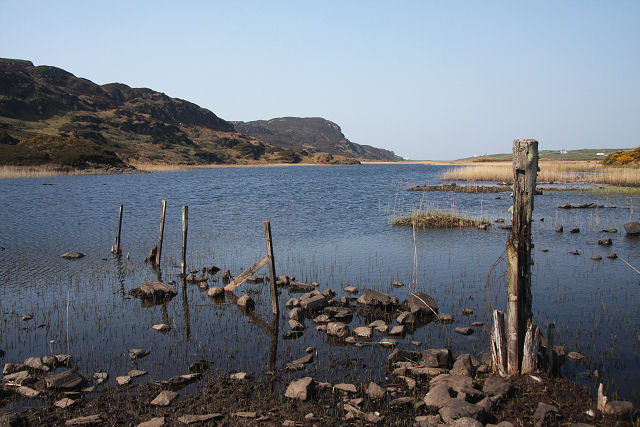
- Middle Loch Fada showing the mountainous south-eastern shore

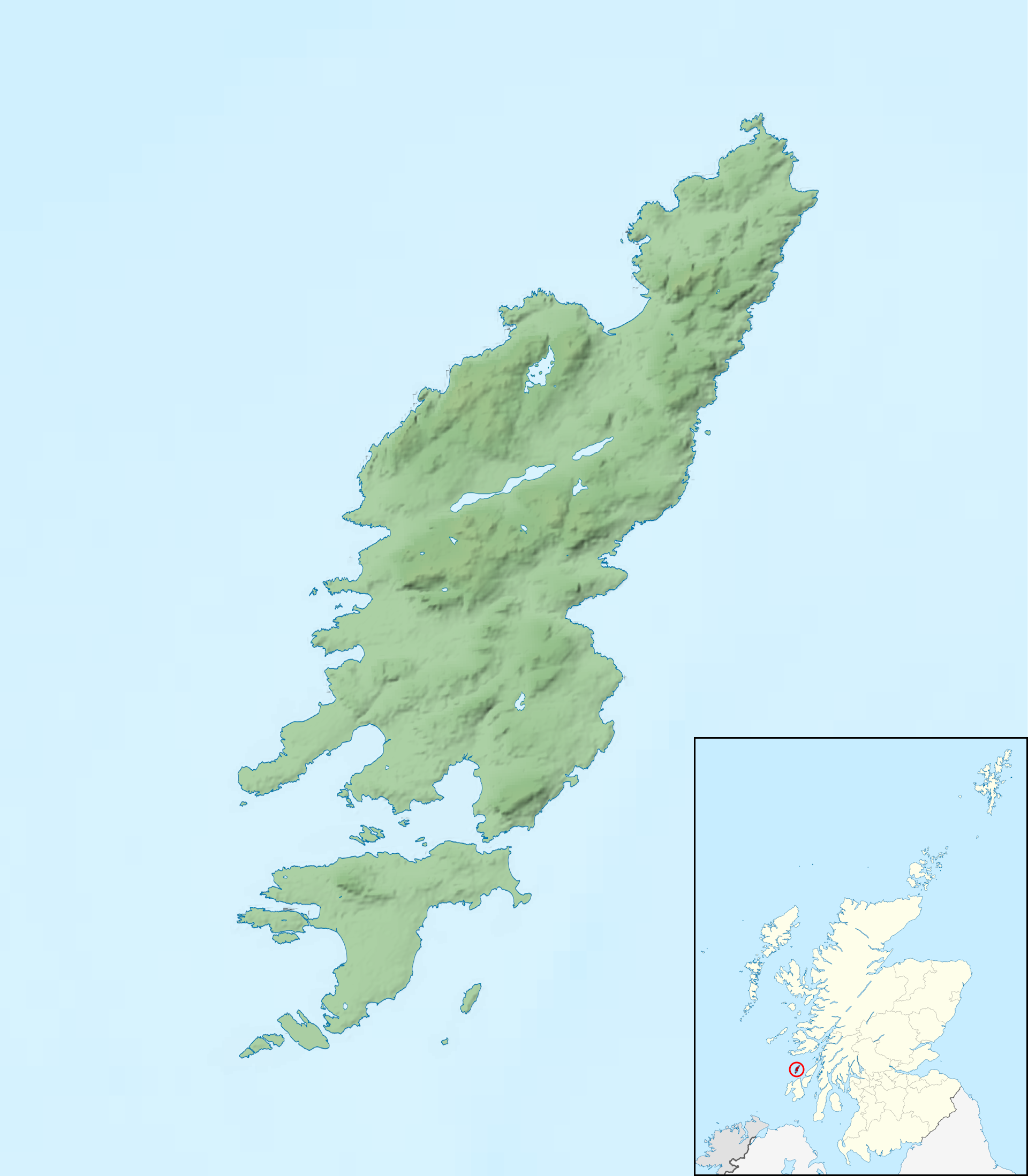
- Location within Colonsay
- Location: Colonsay, Scotland
- Coordinates: 56.08147°N 6.20556°W
- Type: loch

Loch Fada (English: Long Lake) is a loch located on the Inner Hebridean island of Colonsay, Scotland. It extends between Kiloran and Lower Kilchattan approximately 3 km (1.9 mi) and is the largest loch on Colonsay. It is located at grid reference NR385955

The loch consists of a string of three lochs and is a Designated Special Area of Conservation (SAC).

== Association ==
The Royal Navy frigate HMS Loch Fada was named after the loch.
