= 3rd Frigate Squadron =

- Active: February 1949 – May 1980
- Country: United Kingdom
- Branch: Royal Navy
- Part of: Far East Fleet; First Flotilla
- Garrison/HQ: HMNB Singapore (1949–1963); HMNB Portsmouth, (1972–1980)

Commanders
- First: Captain Alan D.H. Jay
- Last: Captain Kenneth A. Snow

The 3rd Frigate Squadron also known as the Third Frigate Squadron was a naval formation of the Royal Navy from February 1949 to 1963 and again from 1972 to May 1980.

The 3rd Frigate Squadron was formed in February 1949 and was assigned to the East Indies Fleet later Far East Fleet until February 1964 when it was re-designated the 26th Escort Squadron. It was reformed in 1972 when it was allocated to the 1st Flotilla it was administered by Flag Officer, first Flotilla until the appointment of a Captain (F) in December 1973 it remained with the 1st flotilla until April 1976. It then transferred to the 2nd Flotilla until May 1980 when it was disbanded.

== Captains (F), 3rd Frigate Squadron ==
Post holders included:

Commander	Ship	Dates
Captain Alan D.H. Jay	HMS Black Swan	February 1949 – June 1950
Captain George A.F. Norfolk	HMS Black Swan	June 1950 – 1952
Captain George O. Roberts	HMS Cardigan Bay	April 1956 – April 1958
Captain Peter J. Wyatt	HMS Cardigan Bay	April 1958 – October 1959
Captain Alan R. Aldous	HMS Cardigan Bay	October 1959 – May 1961
Captain Michael F. Fell	HMS Loch Killisport	May 1961 – February 1963
Captain William C. Simpson	HMS Loch Killisport	February 1963 – February 1964
Captain Michael E. Barrow	HMS Diomede	December 1973 – May 1974
Captain John H.F.C. de Winton	HMS Leander	May 1974 – June 1975
Captain John M. Tait	HMS Leander	June 1975 – December 1976
Captain Alastair F.C. Wemyss	HMS Diomede	December 1976 – October 1978
Captain Kenneth A. Snow	HMS Arethusa	October 1978 – May 1980
