= HMS Loch Alvie =

Frigate of the Royal Navy

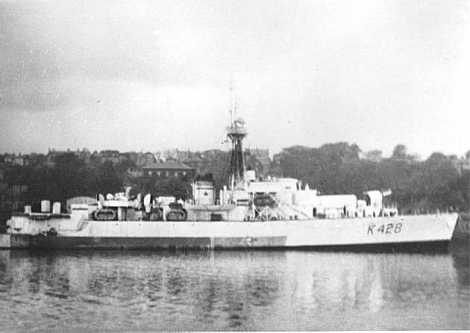
- HMCS Loch Alvie

History

United Kingdom
- Name: Loch Alvie
- Namesake: Loch Alvie, Scotland
- Ordered: 2 February 1943
- Builder: Barclay, Curle & Company, Whiteinch, Glasgow
- Yard number: 700
- Laid down: 31 August 1943
- Launched: 14 April 1944
- Commissioned: 1950
- Decommissioned: November 1963

Canada
- Name: Loch Alvie
- Commissioned: 10 August 1944
- Decommissioned: 11 June 1945
- Honours and awards: Arctic 1944–45; English Channel 1945
- Fate: Sold for scrapping, 20 September 1965

General characteristics
- Class & type: Loch-class frigate
- Displacement: 1,435 long tons (1,458 t)
- Length: 307 ft 9 in (93.80 m)
- Beam: 38 ft 9 in (11.81 m)
- Draught: 8 ft 9 in (2.67 m)
- Propulsion: 2 × Admiralty 3-drum boilers; 2 shafts; 4-cylinder vertical triple expansion reciprocating engines, 5,500 hp (4,100 kW)
- Speed: 20 knots (37 km/h)
- Range: 9,500 nautical miles (17,600 km) at 12 knots (22 km/h)
- Complement: 114
- Armament: 1 × QF 4 inch Mark V on 1 single mounting HA Mk.III**; 4 × QF 2-pounder Mk.VII on 1 quad mount Mk.VII; 4 × 20 mm Oerlikon A/A on 2 twin mounts Mk.V (or 2 × 40 mm Bofors A/A on 2 single mounts Mk.III); Up to 8 × 20 mm Oerlikon A/A on single mounts Mk.III; 2 × Squid triple barreled A/S mortars; 1 rail and 2 throwers for depth charges

HMS Loch Alvie was a Loch-class frigate of the Royal Navy, named after Loch Alvie in Scotland. She was ordered by the Royal Navy during World War II, but did not see action with them, having transferred to the Royal Canadian Navy before commissioning. After the war she returned to the Royal Navy and would pass in and out of service until 1963.

== Construction and design ==
Loch Alvie was ordered 2 February 1943. She was laid down on 31 August 1943 by Barclay, Curle & Company at Glasgow and launched on 14 April 1944. She was transferred to the Royal Canadian Navy and commissioned on 10 August 1944 at Dalmuir, Scotland.

Loch Alvie was 307 feet 0 inches (93.57 m) long overall and 286 feet 0 inches (87.17 m) between perpendiculars, with a beam of 38 feet 6 inches (11.73 m) and a draught of 12 feet (3.7 m). Displacement was 1,435 long tons (1,458 t) standard and 2,260 long tons (2,300 t) deep load. She was powered by two 4-cylinder triple expansion steam engines fed with steam from two Admiralty 3-drum boilers and rated at 5,500 indicated horsepower (4,100 kW). This gave a speed of 19.5 knots (36.1 km/h; 22.4 mph). Sufficient fuel was carried to give a range of 4,800 nautical miles (8,900 km; 5,500 mi) at 15 knots (28 km/h; 17 mph) in tropical waters.

The ship's main gun armament was a single 4 inches (102 mm) QF 4-inch (102 mm) Mk V gun forward, with an anti-aircraft armament of a quadruple 2-pounder (40-mm) pom-pom aft and at least six Oerlikon 20 mm cannon (two twin powered mountings and at least two single mounts). Two Squid anti-submarine mortars were fitted, with 120 rounds carried, backed up by 15 conventional depth charges. As built, the ship had a complement of 114 officers and men.

Loch Alvie underwent significant modification when under refit from 1952 to 1954, with the ship's gun armament being heavily revised. The 4-inch gun was replaced by a twin Mk XVI 4-inch dual-purpose mount, while the close-in anti-aircraft armament was replaced by an outfit of six Bofors 40 mm guns (1 twin and 4 single mounts), while communications equipment was also upgraded.

== Service history ==
=== World War II ===
After commissioning, Loch Alvie worked up at Tobermory. She joined the 9th Escort Group at Londonderry Port on 19 September 1944. After escorting convoys to and from Gibraltar, on 29 November she sailed as part of the escort of Russian Convoy JW 62, arriving at Murmansk on 7 December, and the return convoy RA 62, which left Kola Bay on 10 December, with Loch Alvie leaving the convoy on 17 December. She then returned to Liverpool for repairs.

The ship returned to convoy escort and anti-submarine operations in the English Channel in February 1945. The frigate deployed into the English Channel with the 9th escort group from 14 March to 20 April 1945. Later Loch Alvie joined Task Group 122.3 for anti-submarine operations and support duties in the South-Western Approaches and Irish Sea while based at Milford Haven.

After the German surrender in May Loch Alvie returned to the Clyde and took part in escorting Convoy JW67 – the last convoy to Russia – before being sent to Trondheim to escort fourteen U-boats to Loch Eriboll as part of "Operation Deadlight".

In June 1945 Loch Alvie was returned to the Royal Navy, paid off officially from the Royal Canadian Navy on 11 July and put into reserve at Sheerness. Lock Alvie and Monnow were the only two Canadian ships of the war never to visit a Canadian port.

=== Post-war ===
Loch Alvie was recommissioned in April 1950 to serve in the 6th Frigate Flotilla of the Home Fleet. In 1951 she took part in the search operation to find the missing submarine HMS Affray. The ship was again decommissioned in April 1952 and placed in reserve at Chatham.

In October 1952, she started a major modernisation and refit at Portsmouth dockyard where her armament was revised, with the refit continuing until January 1954. On completing the refit she was re-commissioned for service in the Persian Gulf.

In October 1960 Loch Alvie completed another refit before returning to the Persian Gulf. In April 1961, when the passenger liner Dara suffered an explosion, Loch Alvie took part in attempts to stop the resulting fires and salvage the ship. Later that year she was deployed to Kuwait as part of Operation Vantage, a deployment of British forces to Kuwait in response to Iraqi threats of invasion.

Loch Alvie was decommissioned at Singapore in November 1963. During 1964 she was stripped of equipment, and the hulk sold to Hong Huat Hardware, Singapore, for scrapping on 20 September 1965.

== Publications ==
- Boniface, Patrick (2013). Loch Class Frigates. Maritime Books. ISBN 978-1-904459-54-5.
- Colledge, J. J.; Warlow, Ben (2006) [1969]. Ships of the Royal Navy: The Complete Record of All Fighting Ships of the Royal Navy from the 15th Century to the Present (3rd Rev ed.). London: Chatham Publishing. ISBN 978-1-86176-281-8. OCLC 67375475.
- Critchley, Mike (1992). British Warships Since 1945. Vol. Part 5: Frigates. Liskeard, UK: Maritime Press. ISBN 0-907771-13-0.
- Elliott, Peter (1977). Allied Escort Ships of World War II: A complete survey. London: Macdonald and Jane's Publishers. ISBN 0-356-08401-9.
- Friedman, Norman (2008). British Destroyers & Frigates: The Second World War and After. Barnsley, UK: Seaforth Publishing. ISBN 978-1-84832-015-4.
- Macpherson, Ken; Barrie, Ron (2002). The Ships of Canada's Naval Forces 1910–2002 (Third ed.). St. Catharines, Ontario, Canada: Vanwell Publishing. ISBN 1-55125-072-1.
- Marriott, Leo (1983). Royal Navy Frigates 1945–1983. London: Ian Allan Ltd. ISBN 07110-1322-5.
- Rohwer, Jürgen (2005). Chronology of the War at Sea 1939–1945: The Naval History of World War Two (Revised & Expanded ed.). Annapolis, Maryland, US: Naval Institute Press. ISBN 1-59114-119-2.
- Ruegg, Bob; Hague, Arnold (1993). Convoys to Russia 1941–1945. Kendal, UK: World Ship Society. ISBN 0-905617-66-5.
