= Squid (weapon) =

Depth charge mortar

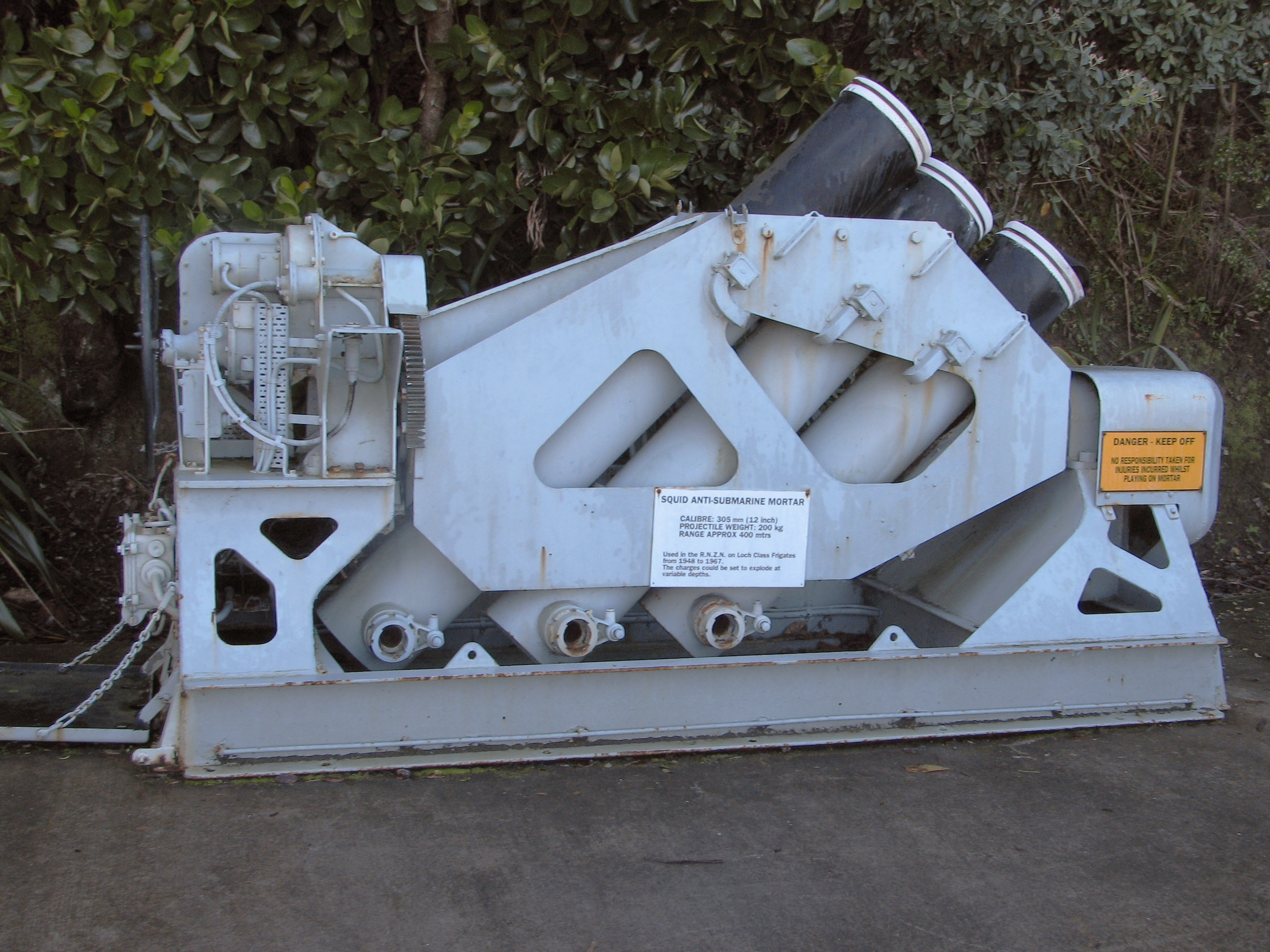
- Squid anti-submarine mortar on display at the Devonport Naval Base
- Type: Anti-submarine Mortar
- Place of origin: United Kingdom

Service history
- In service: 1943–1977
- Used by: Royal Navy, Swedish Navy, Royal Canadian Navy

Production history
- Designer: Directorate of Miscellaneous Weapons Development
- Designed: 1942

Specifications
- Mass: 10 tons
- Shell: 440 lb (200 kg)
- Calibre: 12 in (305 mm)
- Barrels: Three
- Effective firing range: 275 yards (250 m)
- Filling: Minol II
- Filling weight: 207 lb (94 kg)
- Detonation mechanism: Time fuse

Squid was a British World War II ship-mounted anti-submarine weapon. It consisted of a three-barrelled mortar which launched depth charges. It replaced the Hedgehog system, and was in turn replaced by the Limbo system.

== Development ==
Ordered directly from the drawing board in 1942, under the auspices of the Directorate of Miscellaneous Weapons Development, this weapon was rushed into service in May 1943 on board HMS Ambuscade. The first production unit was installed on HMS Hadleigh Castle; it went on to be installed on 70 frigates and corvettes during the Second World War. The first successful use was by HMS Loch Killin on 31 July 1944, when she sank U-333. The system was credited with sinking 17 submarines in 50 attacks over the course of the war - a success ratio of 2.9 to 1. In contrast, out of 5,174 British depth charge attacks in WWII there were 85.5 kills, (Note: A "half" value indicates a kill shared with a non-British entity.) a ratio of 60.5 to 1. The Hedgehog made 268 attacks for 47 kills, a ratio of 5.7 to 1. By 1959, 195 Squid installations had been produced.

This weapon was a three-barrel 12-inch (305 mm) mortar with the mortars mounted in series but off-bore from each other in order to scatter the projectiles. The barrels were mounted in a frame that could be rotated through 90 degrees for loading. The projectiles weighed 390 pounds (177 kg) with a 207-pound (94 kg) minol II charge. (Note: Due to shortages of TNT and RDX (cyclonite) in World War II, the British used a 50/50 mixture of ammonium nitrate and TNT (amatol) in naval mines and depth charges. This low-grade explosive was later improved by the addition of about 20% aluminium powder, producing minol.) On some vessels, the Squid installations were at the stern – the bombs were fired over the length of the ship and dropped into the sea slightly ahead of it. Sink rate was 43.5 ft/s (13.3 m/s) and a clockwork time fuze was used to determine the detonation depth. All three projectiles had to be set to the same depth; this could be continuously updated right up to the moment of launch to take into account the movements of the target. The maximum depth was 900 feet (270 m). The weapons were automatically fired from the sonar range recorder at the proper moment. The pattern formed a triangle about 40 yards (37 m) on a side at a distance of 275 yards (251 m) ahead of the ship. Most Squid installations utilised two sets of mortars. All six bombs were fired in salvo so they formed opposing triangular spreads. The salvos were set to explode 25 feet (7.6 m) above and below the target, the resulting pressure wave crushing the hull of the submarine. Post-war trials found Squid was nine times more effective than conventional depth charges.

== Usage ==
Despite its proven effectiveness, some officers, notably Royal Canadian Navy Captain Kenneth Adams opposed fitting Squid to escorts because it meant sacrificing guns which would make ships unsuitable for fleet actions.

In April 1977, the Type 61 frigate Salisbury became the last ship to fire Squid in Royal Navy service. Examples of the mortars are on display at the Explosion! Museum of Naval Firepower in Gosport, Hampshire and another at Devonport Naval Base. The system is fitted to HMS Cavalier (D73), which is part of the historic ships collection in the Historic Dockyard in Chatham, Kent. It can also be seen on HMCS Haida, which is on display in Hamilton, Ontario and at the naval museum in Malacca, Malaysia.

The Swedish Navy continued to use the Squid system until 1982 when the Östergötland-class destroyers were decommissioned.

== Gallery ==
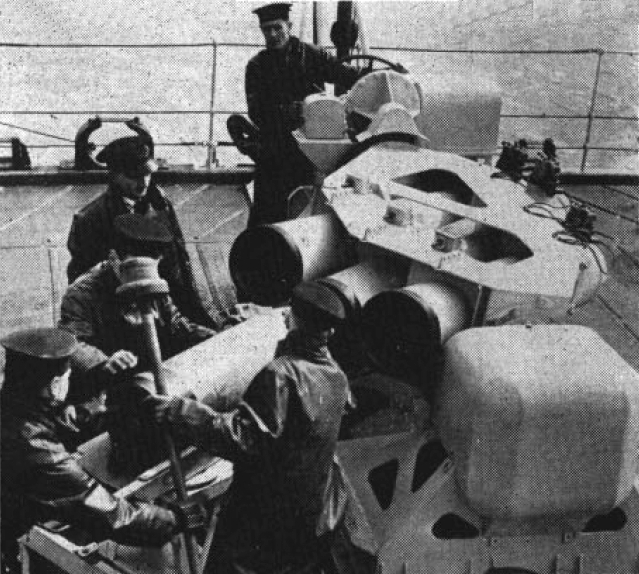
Loading a Squid in 1952

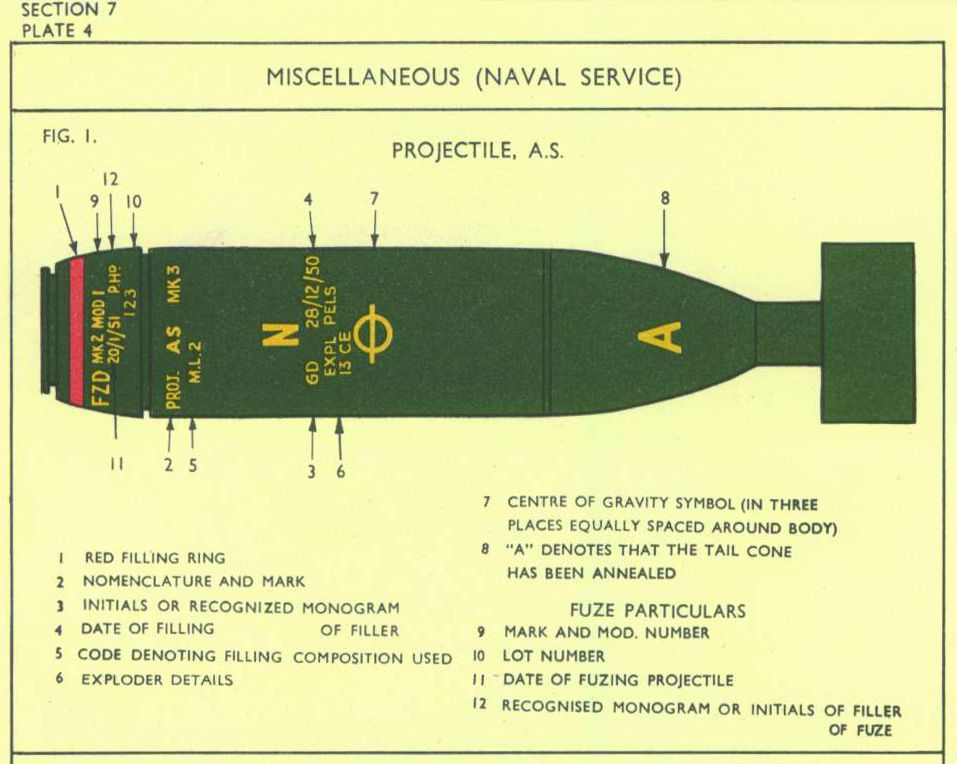
Squid bomb markings diagram

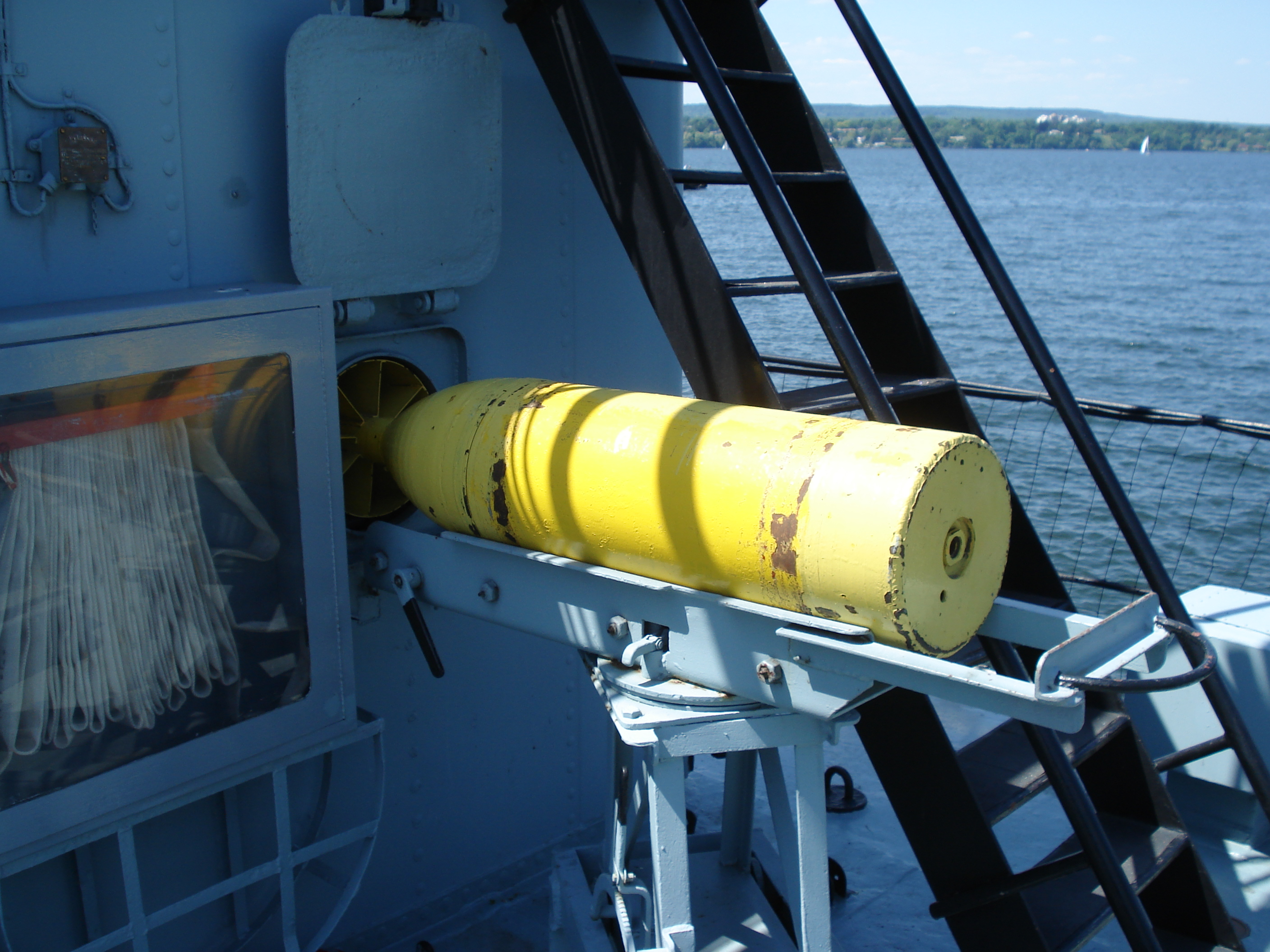
HMCS Haida

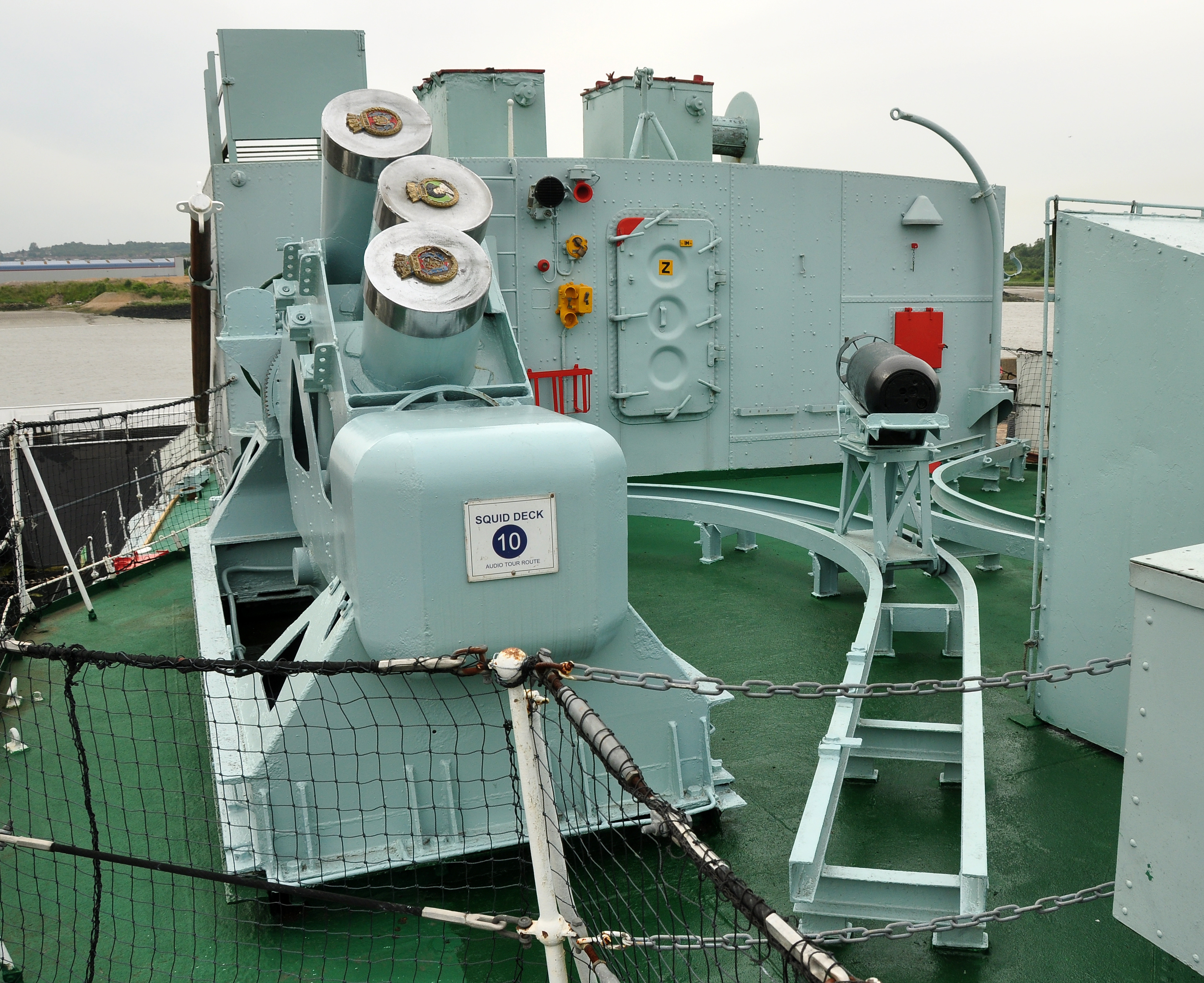
HMS Cavalier
