= Ronald Park =

New Zealand military leader and administrator

Ronald Stuart Park
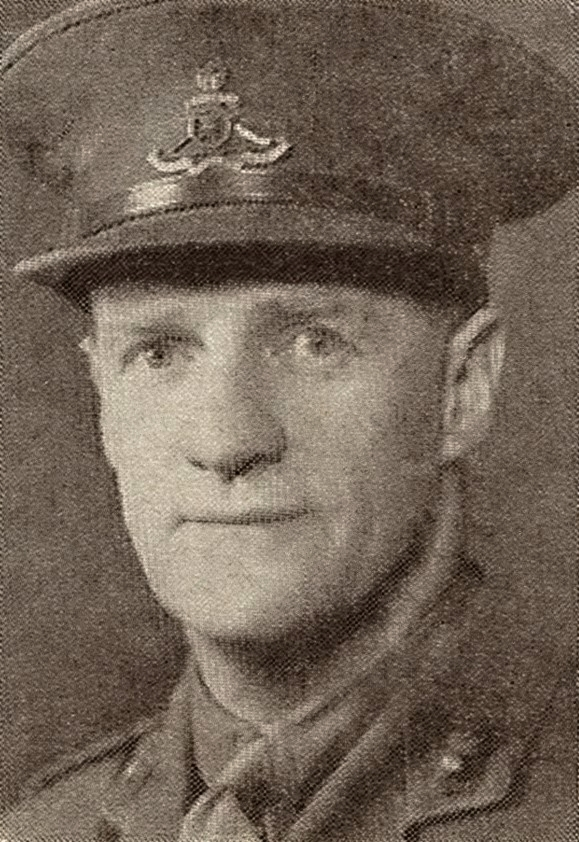
- Born: 18 February 1895; Dunedin, New Zealand
- Died: 15 August 1980 (aged 85); Auckland, New Zealand
- Military career
- Allegiance: New Zealand
- Branch: New Zealand Military Forces
- Service years: 1914–1953
- Rank: Brigadier
- Commands: Kay Force
- Conflicts: First World War; Hundred Days Offensive; Second World War; Korean War
- Awards: Companion of the Order of the Bath; Commander of the Order of the British Empire

Brigadier Ronald Stuart Park CB CBE (18 February 1895 – 15 August 1980) was a New Zealand military leader who served in the First and Second World Wars as well as the Korean War.

Born in Dunedin, Park joined the New Zealand Military Forces in 1914. During the First World War he served initially as an instructor at Featherston Military Camp before proceeding to England as a reinforcement for the New Zealand Expeditionary Force. He served on the Western Front as an artillery officer. In peacetime he held a series of command and administrative posts, including a brief period as commander of the Royal New Zealand Artillery. During the Second World War, he was based in England as commander of the United Kingdom Section of the Second New Zealand Expeditionary Force. He also represented New Zealand on military planning committees. After the war, he commanded the Northern Military District in New Zealand. He retired in July 1950 but was almost immediately recalled to duty as commander of Kayforce, the ground force component of New Zealand's contribution to the United Nations Command. He led Kayforce for nearly three years until November 1953 when he returned to New Zealand and civilian life. He died in 1980, aged 85.

== Early life ==
Ronald Stuart Park was born on 18 February 1895 at Dunedin in New Zealand. He was the son of a clerk, Samuel Park, and his wife, Annie née Maxwell and educated at Otago Boys' High School. He was a keen sportsman, playing cricket and rugby union to a high standard. In 1914, the year after finishing his schooling and desiring a military career, he joined the New Zealand Military Forces. He went as an officer cadet to the Australian Army's Royal Military College in Duntroon in the Australian Capital Territory.

== First World War ==
His cadetship, scheduled to run three years, was accelerated following the outbreak of the First World War, and he graduated in April 1916. He went back to New Zealand and was posted to the instructing staff at Featherston Military Camp.

In November the following year, Park went to England with the 32nd Reinforcements. After a period of service at the headquarters of the New Zealand Expeditionary Force (NZEF) in London, he proceeded to the Western Front in July 1918. Posted to the 9th Battery, 2nd New Zealand Field Artillery Brigade, he participated in the Hundred Days Offensive. By October he was attached to the headquarters of the New Zealand Division as a staff officer for the field artillery.

== Interwar period ==
Park returned in New Zealand in early 1920, having undergone specialist training in England the previous year instead of being repatriated along with other personnel of the NZEF. He held a series of administrative and command posts in the artillery for the next several years, initially in Auckland including a period in command of the artillery unit concerned with the harbour defences in the region. He went to England in 1924 for further specialist training in artillery skills at the Artillery College in Woolwich followed by a period at the Royal School of Artillery at Larkhill in Wiltshire.

By 1927, he was back in New Zealand and was posted to the Central Military District, taking on staff duties at General Headquarters from 1933 as well. In 1935, he was awarded the King George V Silver Jubilee Medal. For a period in 1937, he was commander of the Royal New Zealand Artillery.

== Second World War ==
At the outbreak of the Second World War, Park was sent to London to serve in a liaison role. When the 2nd Echelon of the Second New Zealand Expeditionary Force (2NZEF) was diverted to England in 1940, following the entry of Italy into the war, he was involved in the organisation and allocation of its units around the southeast of England. From 1941 he commanded the United Kingdom Section of the 2NZEF and the following year was appointed the New Zealand representative on the Joint Planning Staff, a subcommittee of the Chiefs of Staff Committee, in London. In the latter capacity, as military operations were planned, particularly in the Pacific Theatre, he looked after New Zealand interests and reported back to the New Zealand Government. He was appointed a Commander of the Order of the British Empire in the 1943 King's Birthday Honours. After the war, during the Paris Peace Conference that began in 1946, he was part of the New Zealand delegation as its military advisor.

In peacetime, Park had originally been the appointee for adjutant general and third military member of the New Zealand Army Board, but instead was given command of the Northern Military District. He held this position from May 1947 to February 1950. He retired from the military four months later, having attained the rank of brigadier.

== Korean War ==
Following the outbreak of the Korean War in late June 1950, New Zealand committed to the raising of a military force to join the United Nations' efforts to repel the North Koreans from the Republic of Korea. With the majority of the professional soldiers of the New Zealand Military Forces committed to the compulsory military training scheme that had been recently introduced, Park was recalled from his retirement to command the 1,000 or so volunteers that would make up what would be designated Kayforce. His headquarters were formed at Waiouru Military Camp in September. Late the following month, with Kayforce largely established, he left for the Korean peninsula for a reconnaissance visit.

He returned to New Zealand in late November to oversee the final preparations and departure of Kayforce; he himself left for Korea as part of the advance party on 7 December. The main element of Kayforce arrived at Busan at the end of the month and while it was in Korea, Kayforce came under the command of the British Commonwealth Forces Korea (BCFK). Park established his headquarters at Busan, initially on a temporary basis since he anticipated shifting to Daegu, where the BCFK Main Administrative Headquarters was based. However, the move never eventuated and from Busan, Park supervised the administration of Kayforce. For nearly three years he performed his work, coordinating with the United Nations Command as required. He was appointed a Companion of the Order of the Bath in January 1953 in recognition of his "gallant and distinguished service in Korea", and later that year was awarded the Queen Elizabeth II Coronation Medal. In November, his period in command of Kayforce ended and after a regimental parade in his honour, he returned to New Zealand.

== Later life ==
In civilian life Park worked as a transportation administrator in Auckland and from 1955 to 1960 was at the Auckland Harbour Ferry Service District. He was also honorary colonel commandant of the Royal New Zealand Artillery in the Northern Military District. His wife Ozgiene née de Senna, who he had married nearly 45 years earlier, died in January 1967. He married again at the end of the year. He died on 15 August 1980, survived by his second wife Anne. He had no children. His remains were cremated and interred at Purewa Cemetery in Meadowbank, Auckland.
