= 1953 New Zealand gallantry awards =

Awards list for New Zealand

The 1953 New Zealand gallantry awards were announced via a special honours list dated 20 January 1953, and recognised New Zealand military personnel for gallant and distinguished services in Korea between 1 January and 30 June 1952.

== Order of the Bath ==
=== Companion (CB) ===
Military division, additional

- Brigadier Ronald Stuart Park CBE – commander, New Zealand Emergency Force.
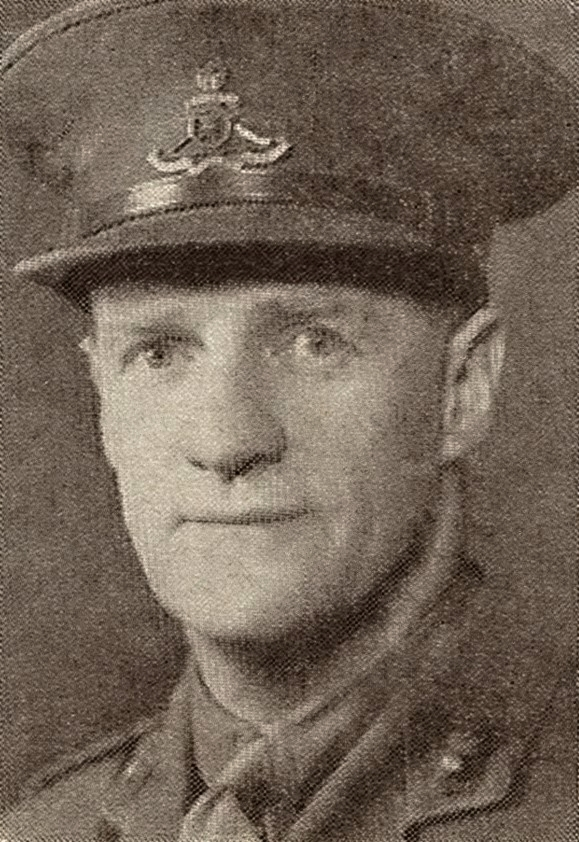
Ronald Park

== Order of the British Empire ==
=== Member (MBE) ===
Military division, additional

- Second Lieutenant Richard Marchant Burrows – Royal New Zealand Corps of Signals.
- Major George Solomon – Royal New Zealand Artillery.
- Captain Jack Mahony Wilson – Royal New Zealand Electrical and Mechanical Engineers.

== Military Medal (MM) ==
- Bombardier Louis John Maioni Gordon – Royal New Zealand Artillery.

== Mention in despatches ==
- Bombardier John Howard Beange – Royal New Zealand Artillery.
- Sergeant Reginald Thomas Benyon – Royal New Zealand Army Medical Corps.
- Warrant Officer (Class I) John Dickinson – Royal New Zealand Artillery.
- Warrant Officer (Class I) Evan Charles Gummer – New Zealand Regiment.
- Lance Corporal Ian Lockhard Hawkes – Royal New Zealand Army Service Corps.
- Captain Cecil John Moloughney – Royal New Zealand Artillery.
- Temporary Corporal Robert Alexander Struthers – Royal New Zealand Corps of Signals.
- Temporary Captain Thomas Alfred Noel Vine – Royal New Zealand Artillery.
- Sergeant Robert Wallace – Royal New Zealand Corps of Signals.
