= 1943 Birthday Honours (New Zealand) =

Awards list for New Zealand

The 1943 King's Birthday Honours in New Zealand, celebrating the official birthday of King George VI, were appointments made by the King to various orders and honours. The awards were made in recognition of war service by New Zealanders and were announced on 2 June 1943. No civilian awards were made.

The recipients of honours are displayed here as they were styled before their new honour.

== Order of the Bath ==
=== Companion (CB) ===
Military division, additional

- Air Vice-Marshal Robert Victor Goddard CBE – Royal New Zealand Air Force; of Wellington.
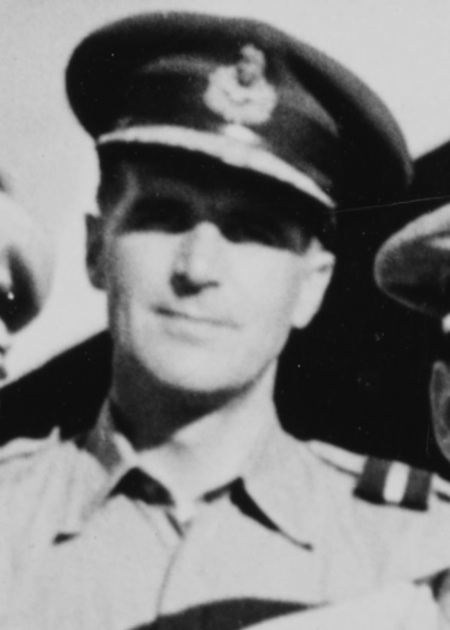
Victor Goddard

== Order of the British Empire ==
=== Commander (CBE) ===
Military division, additional

- Lieutenant-Colonel (temporary Brigadier) Ronald Stuart Park – Royal New Zealand Artillery.
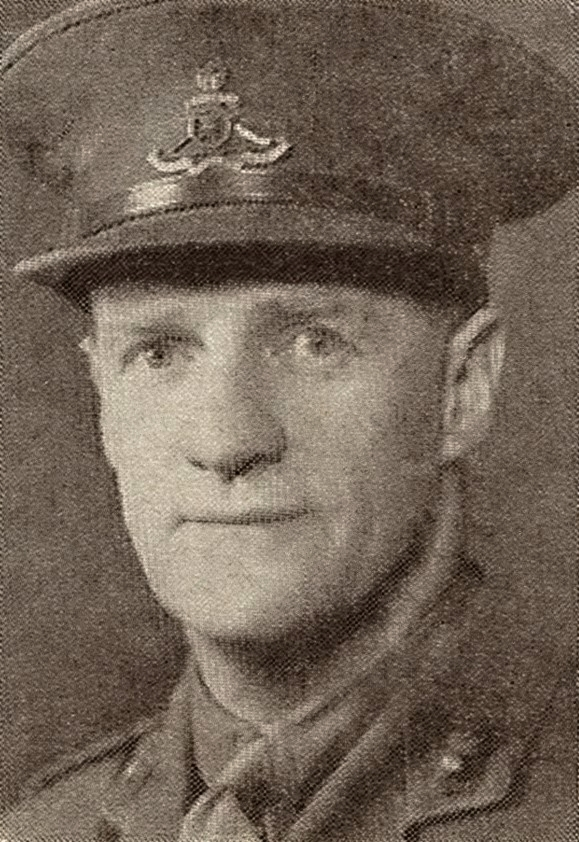
Ronald Park

=== Officer (OBE) ===
Military division, additional

- Commander Gordon Fraser Hannay – Royal Navy (retired); of Wellington.
- Wing Commander Michael Sullivan Keogh AM – Royal New Zealand Air Force; of Wellington.
- Colonel Ivan Stuart Wilson MC ED FRCS – New Zealand Medical Corps; of Wellington.
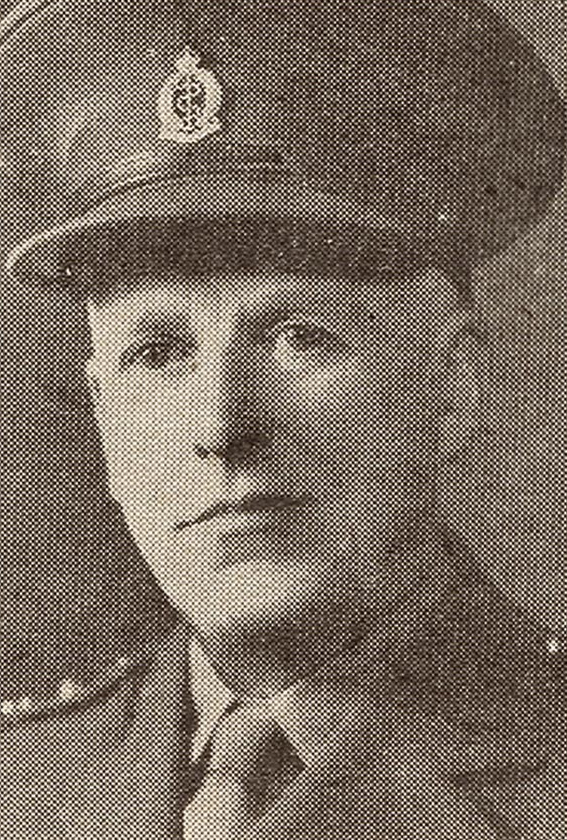
Ivan Wilson

=== Member (MBE) ===
Military division, additional

- Captain John Wesley Loper – New Zealand Military Forces; of Wellington.
- Captain (Quartermaster) Archibald Mathieson – New Zealand Military Forces; of Timaru.
- Flying Officer John James McDowell – Royal New Zealand Air Force.
- Temporary Telegraphist Lieutenant Halson Philpott – Royal New Zealand Navy; of Wellington.

== British Empire Medal (BEM) ==
Military division

- Flight Sergeant George Joseph Goodsell – Royal New Zealand Air Force; of Auckland.
- Staff Sergeant George James McKandry – New Zealand Military Forces; of Auckland.
- Corporal Alan Stuart Paterson – Royal New Zealand Air Force; of Herbert.
- Sergeant Craig Martyn Renner – Royal New Zealand Air Force.
- Lance Corporal Martin Marshall Small – Wellington West Coast Regiment, New Zealand Military Forces; formerly of Masterton.

== Air Force Cross (AFC) ==
- Squadron Leader Edgar Francis Harvie – Royal New Zealand Air Force.
- Squadron Leader Ronald Bruce Leslie MacGregor – Royal New Zealand Air Force; of Christchurch.
- Squadron Leader Oliver James O'Brien – Royal Air Force; of Christchurch.
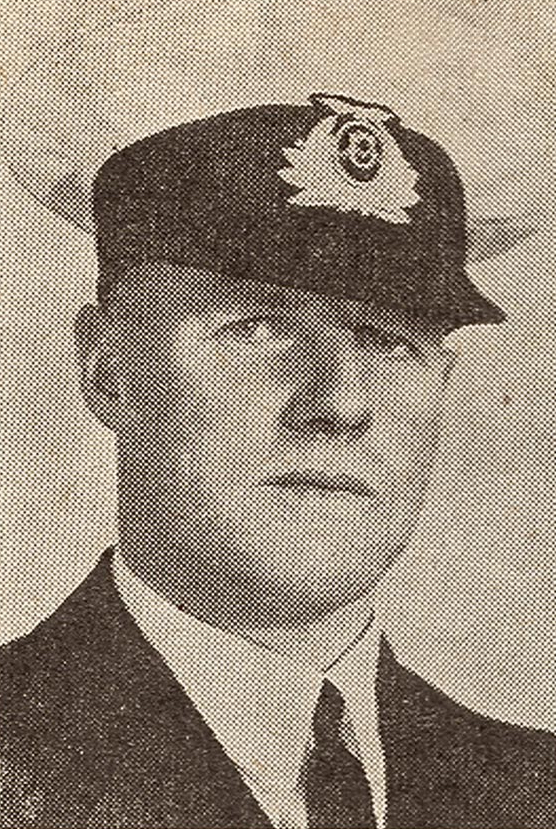
Ronald MacGregor

== Mention in despatches ==
- Flying Officer Donald Arthur Adams – Royal New Zealand Air Force; of Hamilton. (Note: Missing)
- Sergeant Eric William Barr – Royal New Zealand Air Force; of Christchurch
- Acting Flight Lieutenant Ivan Oswald Breckon – Royal New Zealand Air Force; of Auckland.
- Sergeant Richmond Brough – Royal New Zealand Air Force; of Mangateparu. (Note: Since deceased)
- Pilot Officer Francis Charles Fox – Royal New Zealand Air Force; of Napier.
- Leading Aircraftman Clarence Mervyn Glading – Royal New Zealand Air Force; of Rahotu
- Pilot Officer Malcolm Robert Head – Royal New Zealand Air Force; of Invercargill.
- Flight Lieutenant David John Verdun Henry – Royal New Zealand Air Force; of Invercargill.
- Sergeant John Lloyd Joyce – Royal New Zealand Air Force; of Christchurch.
- Acting Squadron Leader Phillip John Lamason DFC – Royal New Zealand Air Force; of Napier.
- Acting Squadron Leader Roy John Alexander Leslie – Royal Air Force; of Waitara.
- Sergeant John Anderson Macpherson – Royal New Zealand Air Force; of Kaitaia.
- Acting Flight Lieutenant Roy Bramwell Spear DFC – Royal New Zealand Air Force; of Christchurch.
- Squadron Leader Freeman Jesse Steel DFC – Royal New Zealand Air Force; of Napier.
- Flying Officer John Gordon Thomson – Royal New Zealand Air Force; of Manakau.
- Acting Squadron Leader Stephen Delancy Watts – Royal New Zealand Air Force; of Morrinsville.
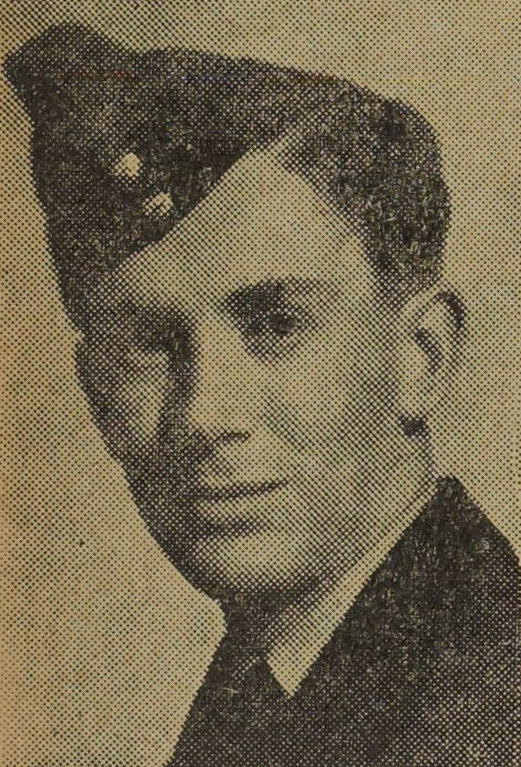
Donald Arthur Adams

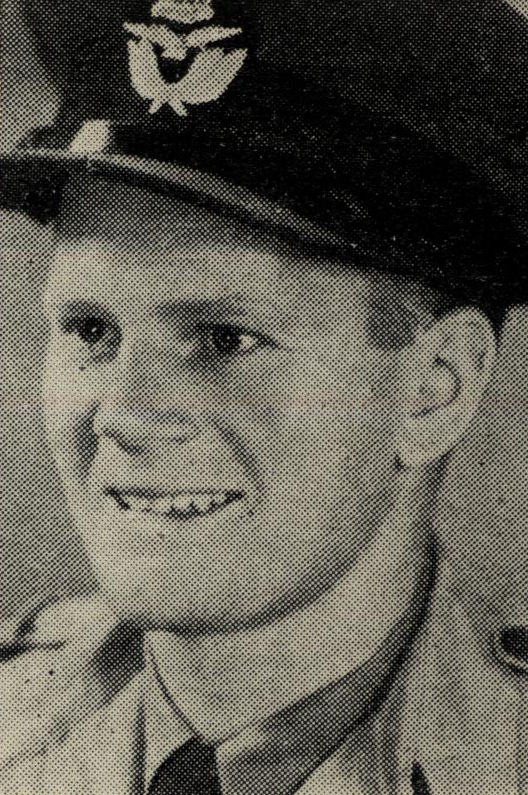
Eric William Barr

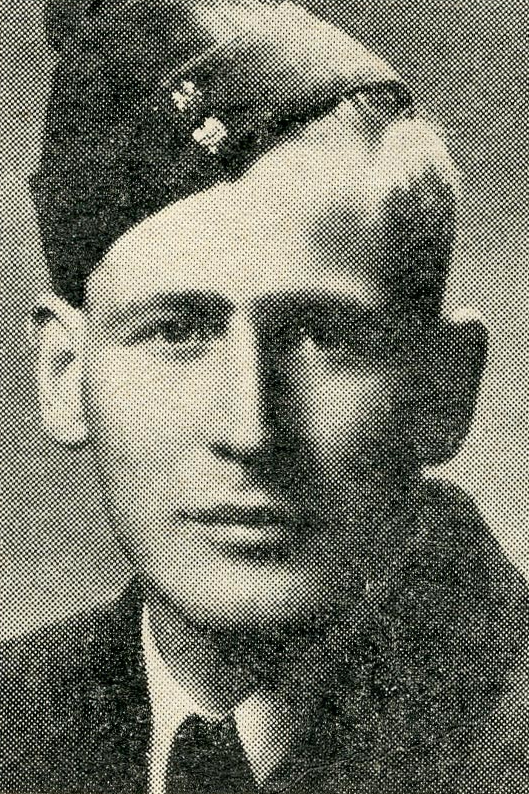
Richmond Brough

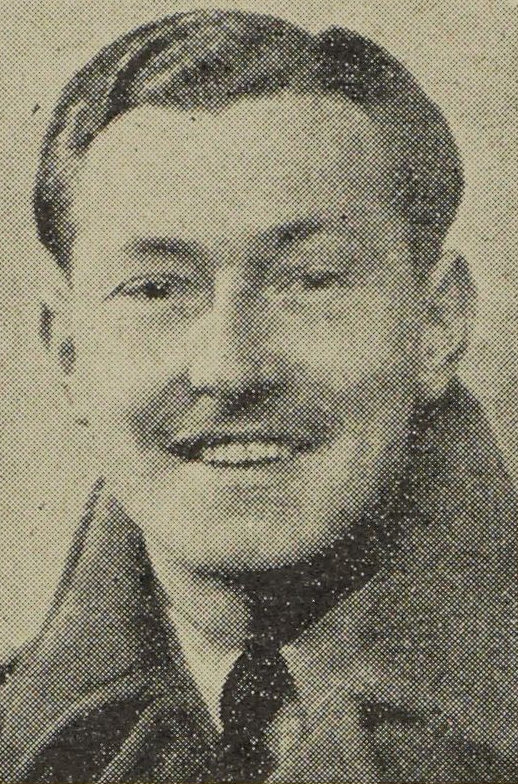
Malcolm Robert Head

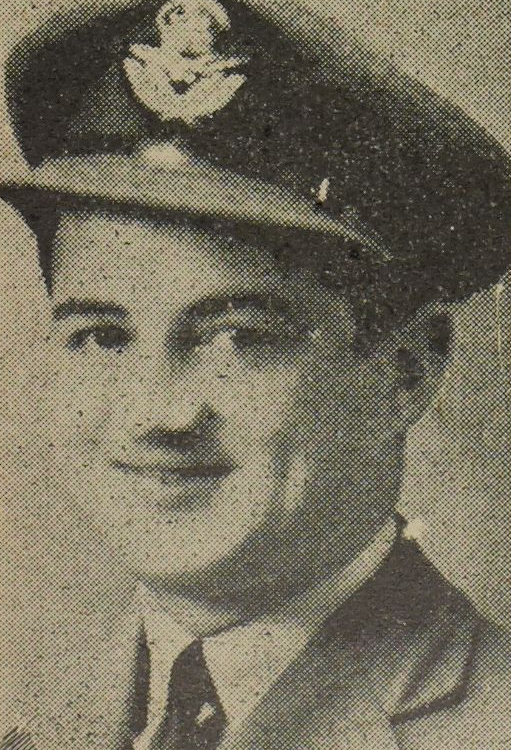
David John Verdun Henry

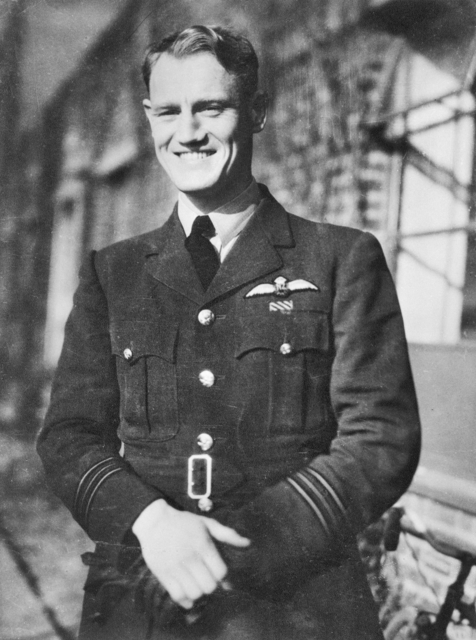
Phil Lamason

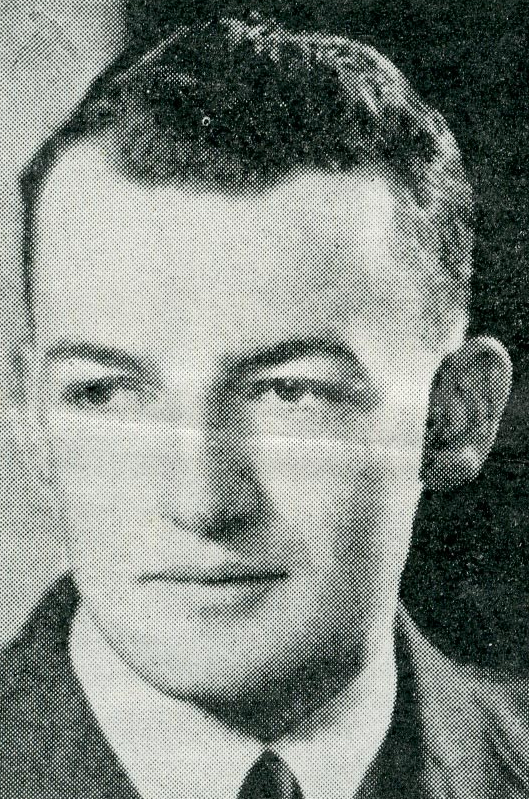
Freeman Jesse Steel
