= Victor Goddard =

Royal Air Force air marshal (1897–1987)

Sir Victor Goddard
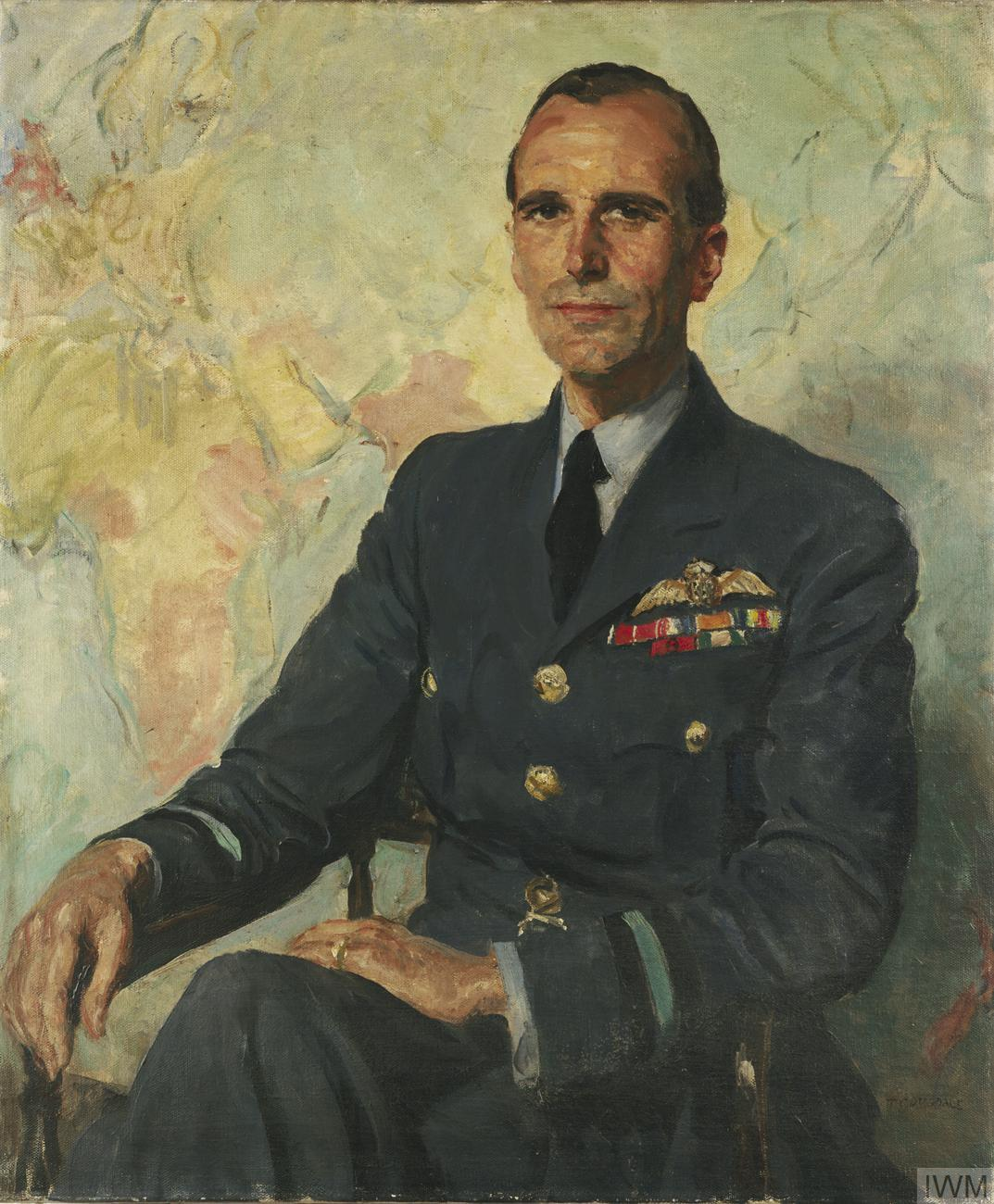
- Goddard in 1941, by Thomas Cantrell Dugdale
- Born: Robert Victor Goddard; 6 February 1897; Wembley, London
- Died: 21 January 1987 (aged 89)
- Military career
- Allegiance: United Kingdom
- Branch: Royal Navy (1910–1918); Royal Air Force (1918–1951)
- Service years: 1910–1951
- Rank: Air Marshal
- Commands: Chief of the New Zealand Air Staff (1941–1943); No. 30 Squadron RAF (1930–1931)
- Conflicts: First World War; Western Front; Battle of the Somme; Second World War; Battle of France; South West Pacific theatre; Solomon Islands campaign; Guadalcanal Campaign; South-East Asian theatre
- Awards: Knight Commander of the Order of the Bath; Commander of the Order of the British Empire; Mentioned in Despatches (2); Navy Distinguished Service Medal (United States)

Air Marshal Sir Robert Victor Goddard, KCB, CBE, DL (6 February 1897 – 21 January 1987) was a senior commander in the Royal Air Force during the Second World War.

Goddard is perhaps best known for his interest in paranormal phenomena. He claimed to have witnessed a clairvoyant incident in 1946, upon which the feature film The Night My Number Came Up (1955) was based.

== Early life ==
Goddard was born at Wembley the son of Dr Charles Goddard. After attending St George's School, Harpenden, he went to the Royal Naval Colleges at Osborne and Dartmouth. He served as a midshipman in the first year of the First World War and in 1915 joined the Royal Naval Air Service. At this time he met his lifelong friend Barnes Wallis. His duties included patrolling for submarines in dirigibles; he claims that during this period he was responsible for the creation of the term "blimp". In 1916, he commanded airship reconnaissance flights over the Somme battlefield.

== Between the wars ==
In 1921, Goddard was selected to read engineering at Jesus College, Cambridge and then studied at Imperial College London before returning to Cambridge in 1925 as an instructor to the university's air squadron. After graduating from the Royal Naval Staff College in 1929, he commanded a bomber squadron in Iraq. He returned to England in 1931 as chief instructor of the officers' engineering course. He was then at the Staff College until 1935 when he was appointed deputy director of intelligence at the Air Ministry. He held this post until the outbreak of the Second World War.

Goddard later claimed to have had a clairvoyant episode in 1935, at RAF Drem, in Scotland. He claimed that he had been flying a mission to inspect the airfield at Drem which was decommissioned at the time. After flying through some rough weather he emerged to see the airfield seemingly fully operational with planes and attending crew. He noted that he observed a number of yellow planes, one being a monoplane he could not identify. He saw a number of mechanics in blue overalls which did not fit with RAF operations at the time, as mechanics wore tan overalls. In the following years the airfield at Drem was reactivated, the RAAF began painting their training planes yellow and changed the mechanics uniforms to blue, exactly as Victor had observed years prior. Victor's account of this event has been referred to as a potential real time slip.

== Second World War ==
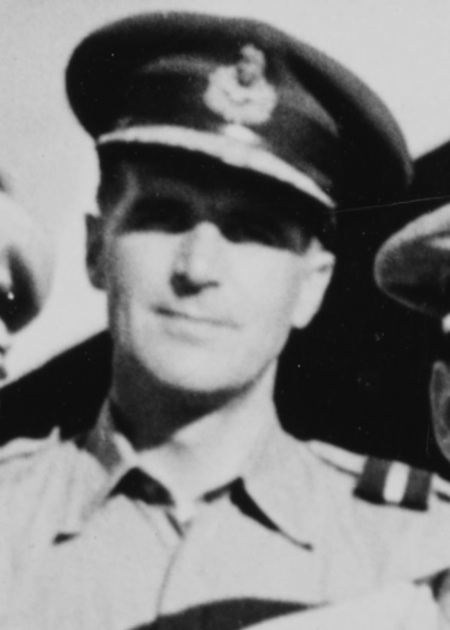
Goddard as an air commodore in 1943

Goddard went with the British Expeditionary Force to France in 1939. In 1940, he was made senior air staff officer and played a major part in preserving British air assets in the face of the German attacks. When he returned he became director of military cooperation at the Air Ministry, responsible for modernising air support and airborne forces in the RAF. He also made regular air war broadcasts on the BBC.

In September 1941, shortly before the attack on Pearl Harbor, he was appointed as Air Commodore Chief of the Air Staff, Royal New Zealand Air Force (RNZAF). As commander of the RNZAF in the South Pacific, and the only British commander in the region, he was prominent in the operations against the Japanese initial advance. Under Admiral Halsey, US Navy, he commanded the RNZAF in the Battle of Guadalcanal and the Solomon Islands campaigns, for which he was awarded the American Navy Distinguished Service Medal. In the 1943 King's Birthday Honours, he was appointed a Companion of the Order of the Bath.

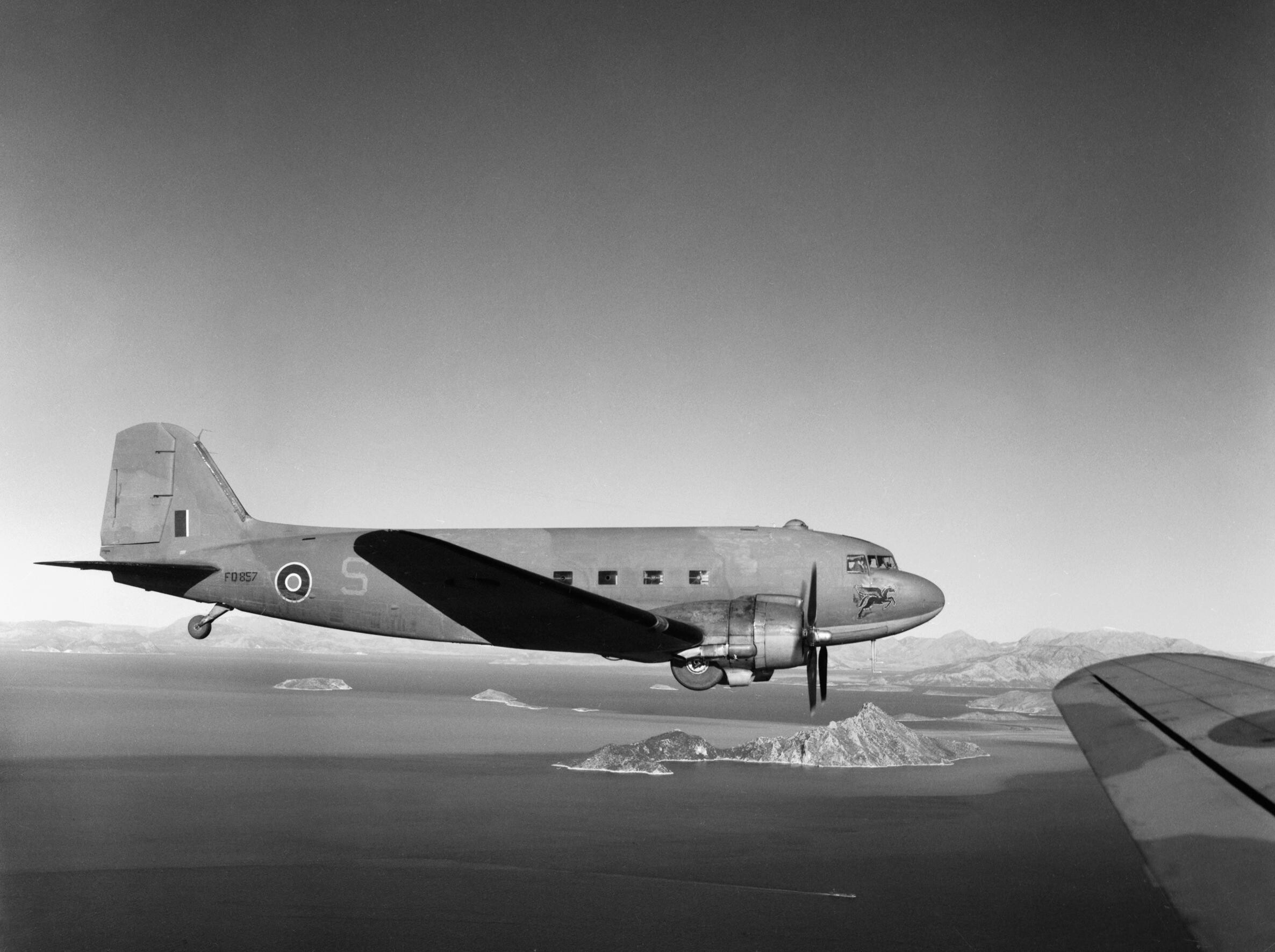
A RAF Douglas Dakota transport similar to the aircraft in which Goddard survived a crash in 1946.

In 1943, Goddard was posted to India to take charge of administration for the air command of South East Asia Command (SEAC). He remained in the role until 1946 when he became the RAF's representative in Washington.

He claimed to have witnessed the clairvoyant experience of another officer, in China during January 1946. According to Goddard, he was at a party in Shanghai and scheduled to fly to Tokyo that same night, when he heard of another officer having a dream in which Goddard was killed in a plane crash. In the dream an aircraft was carrying Goddard, two other men and a woman, when it experienced difficulties with atmospheric icing, and crashed on a pebbled beach near mountains.

That night, Goddard was persuaded to take two men and a woman on the Douglas Dakota transport flying to Tokyo. As in the other's officer's dream, the Dakota plane iced over and was forced to make a crash-landing on the Japanese island of Sado; the crash scene, a pebbled beach near mountains, resembled that described in the dream. Unlike the dream, no-one was injured.

The story was published in The Saturday Evening Post of May 26, 1951. The 1955 film, The Night My Number Came Up, was based on the incident. Michael Redgrave played Goddard, who was depicted in the film as becoming excited for a few seconds as the plane made its crash-landing. That reportedly annoyed Goddard, who had been proud of what he had seen as his unemotional behaviour.

== Later life ==
Goddard retired in 1951. He became the principal of the College of Aeronautics, where he remained until 1954. He was also a governor of St George's School Harpenden and of Bryanston School. He was the president of the Airship Association from 1975 to 1984.

In 1971, he encouraged Sir George Trevelyan to set up the Wrekin Trust, a body promoting "spiritual education". It occupied much of his time in retirement. Through it he became convinced of the reality of the world of the spirit. He spent many years investigating, and lecturing on, flying saucers. On 3 May 1969, he gave a talk on UFOs at Caxton Hall in London, in which he defended the paraphysical hypothesis.

Goddard argued for extrasensory perception and other paranormal phenomena in his book Flight Towards Reality (1975). His claims are disputed by sceptics.

Goddard wrote the foreword to Muriel Dowding's 1980 autobiography and Allan Barham's Strange to Relate (1984).

== Family ==
In 1924, Goddard married Mildred Catherine Jane Inglis, the daughter of Alfred Inglis and his wife Ernestine (Nina) Pigou, daughter of Francis Pigou, the Dean of Bristol. Their daughter, Jane Helen Goddard, was married to Sir Robin Chichester-Clark.

== Publications ==
- The Enigma of Menace (1959)
- Flight Towards Reality (1975)
- Skies to Dunkirk, (1982)

Military offices
Preceded by Group Captain Hugh Saunders	Chief of the Air Staff (RNZAF); 1941–1943	Succeeded by Air Vice Marshal Leonard Isitt
