= The Night My Number Came Up =

1955 British film by Leslie Norman

- UK release poster
- Directed by: Leslie Norman
- Written by: R. C. Sherriff; Victor Goddard (story)
- Produced by: Michael Balcon
- Starring: Michael Redgrave; Sheila Sim; Alexander Knox; Denholm Elliott
- Cinematography: Lionel Banes
- Edited by: Peter Tanner
- Music by: Malcolm Arnold
- Production company: Ealing Studios
- Distributed by: General Film Distributors (UK); Continental Film Distributors (US)
- Release date: 22 March 1955 (UK)
- Running time: 94 minutes
- Country: United Kingdom
- Language: English

The Night My Number Came Up is a 1955 British supernatural drama film directed by Leslie Norman and starring Michael Redgrave, Sheila Sim and Alexander Knox. The screenplay by R. C. Sherriff was based on an incident in the life of British Air Marshal Sir Victor Goddard whose journal was published in The Saturday Evening Post of 26 May 1951.

== Plot ==
Air Marshal Hardie is at a dinner party in Hong Kong at which a naval commander talks about a dream he had, in which an air marshal and seven companions flew in a Douglas Dakota which crashed on a rocky shore. Hardie is due to fly to Tokyo the following day, but is not concerned because many of the details differ from his planned voyage, including a different kind of aircraft.

However, when problems ground the planned aircraft, it is replaced by a Douglas Dakota – as in the dream. Additional passengers arrive, making the total number of people eight passengers and five crew members – as in the dream. As the flight proceeds, eventually most of the details correspond to the dream. The Dakota climbs to avoid bad weather, but ices up. The pilot puts it into a steep dive to unfreeze the undercarriage. This succeeds, but they are now in heavy cloud and the plane has lost its guidance and radio. They believe they are heading for Yokohama Bay in Japan, but having to fly on visuals alone they need to land before sunset.

They become lost and fly around in circles. Events increasingly unfold as in the dream, and the pilot, who knows of the premonition, starts to panic. The senior officer demands that they ditch in the sea, but the pilot wants to attempt an emergency landing on the beach. They run out of fuel and glide towards the mountains, but instead of crashing as in the dream, the pilot manages to bring the aircraft down in a controlled emergency landing. All on board survive.

== Cast ==
- Michael Redgrave as Air Marshal Hardie
- Sheila Sim as Mary Campbell
- Alexander Knox as Owen Robertson
- Denholm Elliott as Mackenzie
- Ursula Jeans as Mrs Robertson
- Ralph Truman as Lord Wainwright
- Michael Hordern as Commander Lindsay
- Nigel Stock as pilot
- Bill Kerr as soldier
- Alfie Bass as soldier
- George Rose as Bennett
- Victor Maddern as engineer
- David Orr as co-pilot
- David Yates as navigator
- Richard Davies as wireless operator
- Doreen Aris as Miss Robertson
- Hugh Moxey as wing commander
- Percy Herbert as R.E.M.E. sergeant
- Stratford Johns as sergeant (uncredited)

== Production ==
The film was made by Ealing Studios.

Leslie Norman said he found the original magazine article and suggested it become a film. He wrote a synopsis and sent it to Michael Balcon, who agreed to make the film – although he refused to let Leslie Norman write the script and insisted on R.C. Sheriff. Norman later said "I don't think R.C. Sheriff added anything to it."

Part of the film was shot in Hong Kong, at Kai Tak Airport. Norman said he was "pretty pleased with" the film but felt "Ursula Jeans was a weak link".

This was Sheila Sim's final film before her retirement from acting.

== Reception ==
The Manchester Guardian wrote: "For a taut, tense, efficient, and unpretentious little thriller it would be hard to beat The Night My Number Came Up."

Monthly Film Bulletin said "Someone relates a dream; and the dream comes true – except for the climax, in which the passengers survive instead of being killed. This makes for a certain lack of surprise in The Night My Number Came Up, particularly as the flashback construction informs us trom the first reel that the plane has crashed, anyway, and reduces the whole story to a single item of doubt. The players are not given much scope with some conventionally written parts, though Nigel Stock creates a genuinely individual figure as the pilot. Direction is efficient."

Variety reviewed the film as "A highly competent piece of filmmaking, it is packed with suspense. [...] Leslie Norman's incisive direction sustains the tension and Lionel Banes has lensed the production with commendable skill."

In British Sound Films David Quinlan writes: "Suspense drama holds the attention all the way."

Leslie Halliwell said: "Intriguing little melodrama which badly lacks a twist ending and foxes itself by flashback construction which leaves very little open to doubt."

In the Time Out Film Guide Trevor Johnston wrote: "Clever plot construction, a plane-load of top British thesps, and smooth handling from director Leslie Norman (Barry's dad) all give good value."

In The Radio Times Guide to Films David Parkinson gave the film 3/5 stars, writing: "This intriguing film bears more than a passing resemblance to the James Stewart airplane melodrama No Highway. Similarly held together by a first-rate central performance, the film features Michael Redgrave intent on grounding his flight to Tokyo as events alarmingly begin to resemble those in a nightmare. Exploring with a keen intelligence the coincidences and implausibilities generated by fear, R.C. Sherriff's tense screenplay is full of unsympathetic, self-obsessed characters, played to a nicety by a model supporting cast."

== Awards ==
The film was nominated for four 1956 BAFTA Awards: Michael Redgrave as Best British Actor, R.C. Sherriff for Best British Screenplay, Best Film from any Source, and Best British Film.
