= New Zealand in the Korean War =

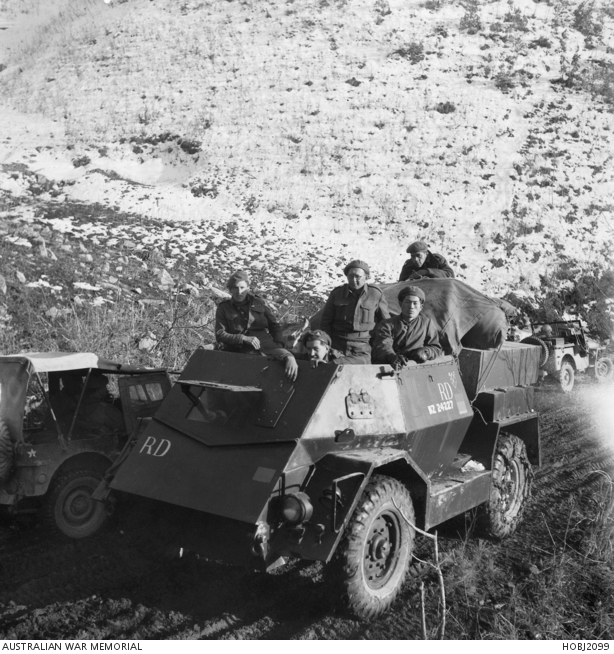
16th New Zealand Field Artillery Regiment soldiers ride in an LPOP

The involvement of New Zealand in the Korean War began in 1950 as a response to the United Nations Security Council's call for combat assistance in the erupting Korean War. New Zealand was one of the first (of a total of sixteen) nations to respond with support.

New Zealand had three main reasons for joining the Korean War; the first was geopolitical, with Communist North Korea being supported by China and the Soviet Union, while the Republic of Korea was backed by other Western democratic powers such as the United States, Canada and the United Kingdom. The second reason was New Zealand's connection to the UN as a founding country and supporter. The third reason was that it was an opportunity for New Zealand to secure its partnership with the United States. The Korean War lasted from 25 June 1950 to 27 July 1953 when an armistice agreement was signed, however New Zealand forces remained in a reduced capacity until final troops were withdrawn in 1957.

== Kayforce ==
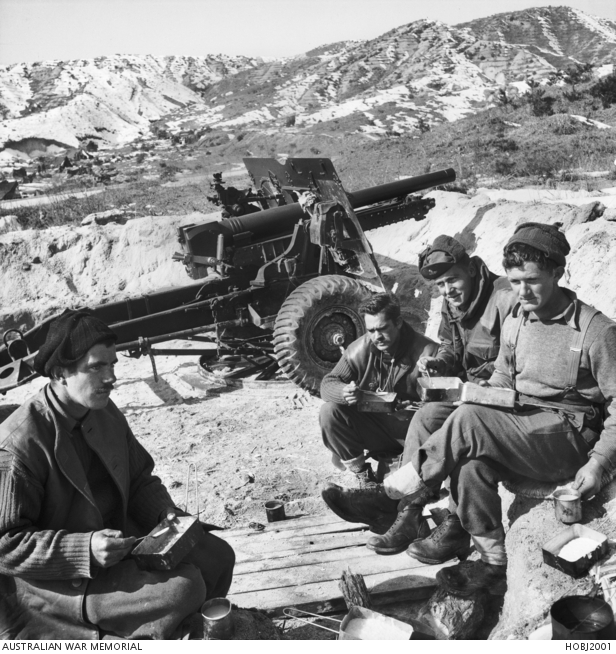
Eating on a Korean hill side, with their 25 pounder gun in the background, are Kayforce Gunners H. A. Milne, L. D. Rankine, D. N. Forsyth, and M. H. Mains.

After some debate, on 26 July 1950, the Government of New Zealand announced it would raise a volunteer military force to serve with UN forces in Korea, just over a month after the start of the war. By 28 July 1950 there was 3,074 men that enlisted to serve in Korea, with numbers increasing to 5,982 by 5 August 1950 when recruitment ceased.

The government raised what was known as Kayforce, a 16th Field Regiment, Royal New Zealand Artillery, which also included 10 Company, Royal New Zealand Army Service Corps and 'Charlie' Troop of the NZ Corps of Signals, overall a total of 1,100 men in the first deployment.

The Kayforce Headquarters was established in September 1950 at Waiouru led by Brigadier R.S Park. The volunteer force was trained by some of the army's regular troops. Major Greville Pleasants was appointed deputy adjutant and quartermaster general.

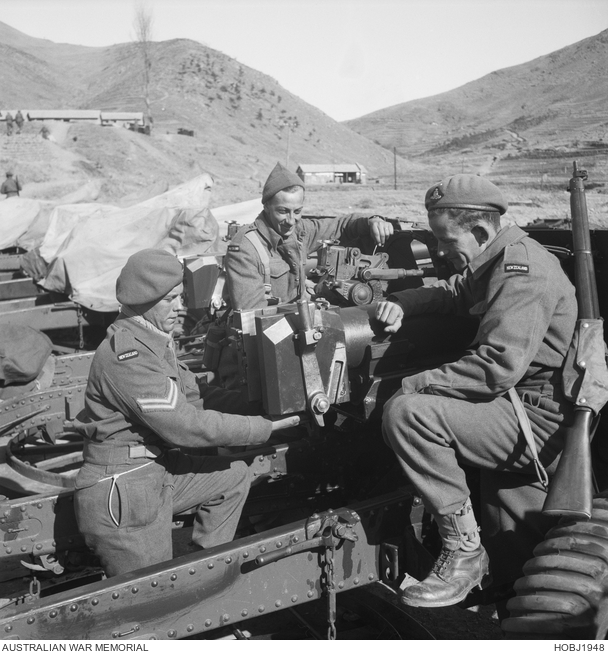
Gunners of the New Zealand Artillery Regiment

New Zealanders had many reasons for wanting to volunteer for service in Korea. Among these was the opportunity to travel overseas to new and exciting places. Opposition of Communist ideologies was also a motivation while for some New Zealanders a sense of patriotism and duty guided their decision. Many who were too young to enlist in World War II felt called to enlist for Korea while some WWII veterans enlisted for the nostalgia and comradery experienced in war. A large portion of those who enlisted had previously served in Jayforce, some eager to return to the adventure of 'the East' and resist the normality of civilian life and post war New Zealand society. Men were selected based upon their physical and medical capacity, their experiences in the army and their relevant skillsets.

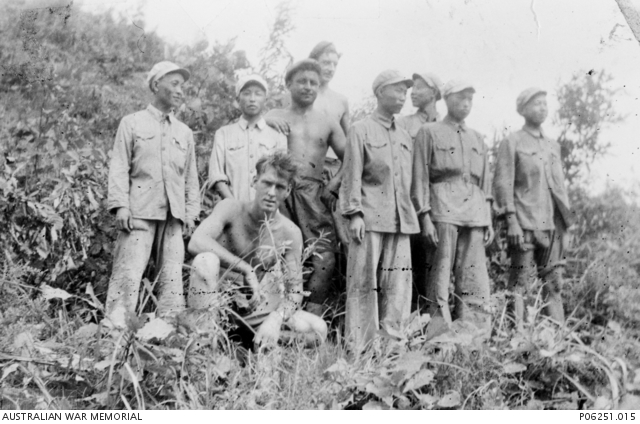
Six Chinese soldiers and three New Zealand soldiers the day after the ceasefire, 1953.

The force left Wellington on 10 December 1950, arriving at Pusan (modern day Busan) on New Year's Eve, joining the British 27th Infantry Brigade 21 January. The New Zealanders immediately saw combat and spent the next two and a half years taking part in the operations (most notably the Battle of Kapyong and the First Battle of Maryang-san) which led the United Nations forces back to and over the 38th Parallel (with the NZ naval vessels being especially active in the inner Han River estuary), later recapturing Seoul in the process.

Although overshadowed by 16 Field Regiment RNZA's contribution to the 1950–54 Korean War, New Zealand also contributed 10 Company, RNZASC as part of Kayforce. They totaled 408 personnel of all ranks and would serve with distinction in Korea from 1951 until 1956 as part of the 1st Commonwealth Division.

Following the armistice, RNZN deployments continued, together with Army support elements until 1957 as Kayforce was gradually reduced in size. The majority of Kayforce had returned to New Zealand by 1955, though it was not until 27 July 1957 that the last New Zealand soldiers left Korea. A single New Zealand military liaison officer on the Commonwealth Liaison Mission, Korea, remained in the country until 1971.

A total of around 6,000 New Zealand soldiers served in the Kayforce and RNZN between 1950-1957. In total forty-five men died during the seven year period of conflict, thirty-three of which were killed in action. Many were eventually buried at the United Nations Memorial Cemetery in Busan, South Korea. Other casualties included 79 wounded and 1 taken prisoner. The prisoner, Norman Graeme Garland, from Cambridge, Waikato, was held in North Korea for eighteen months and repatriated after the armistices.

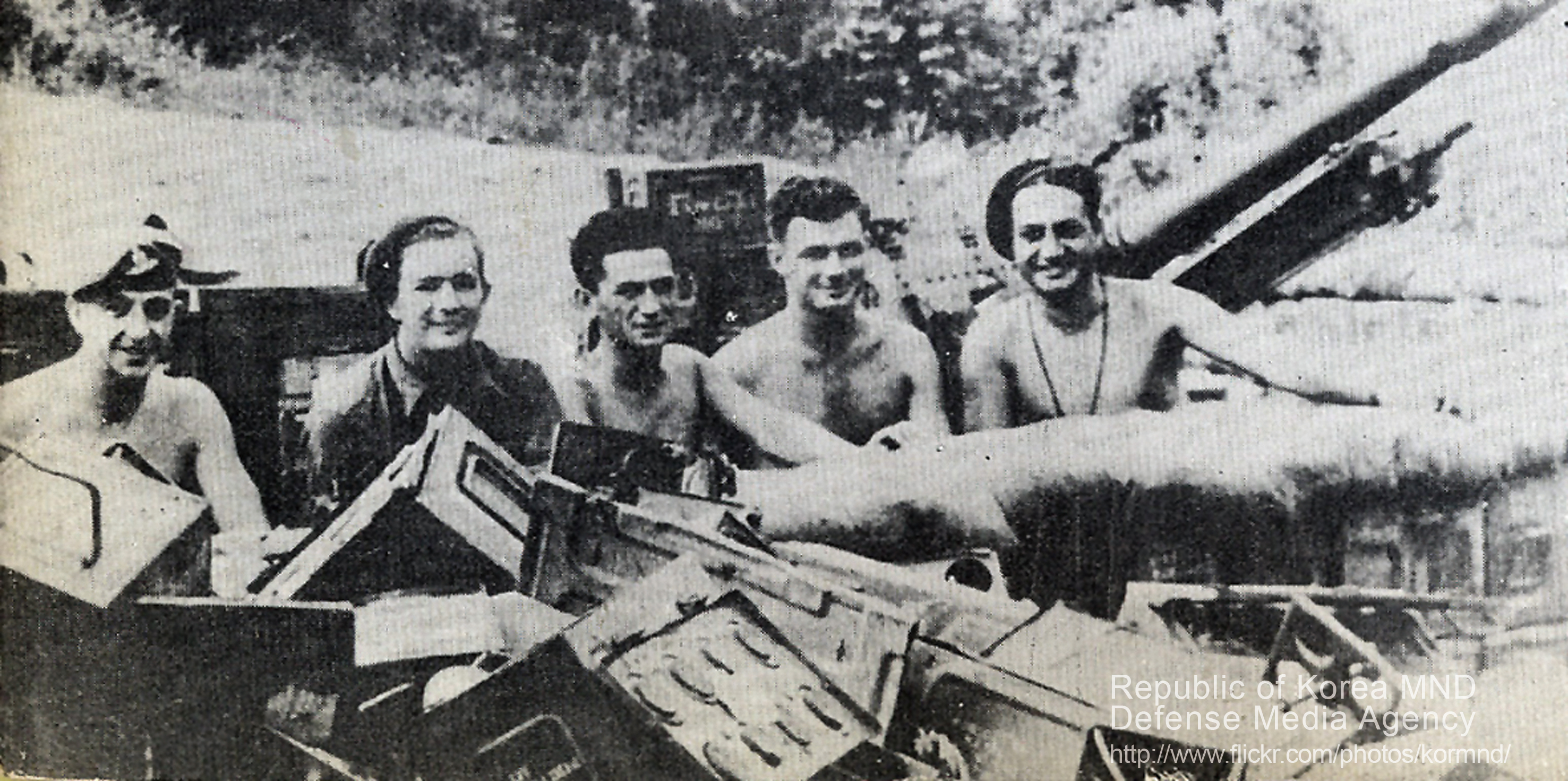
New Zealand soldiers relaxing on post.

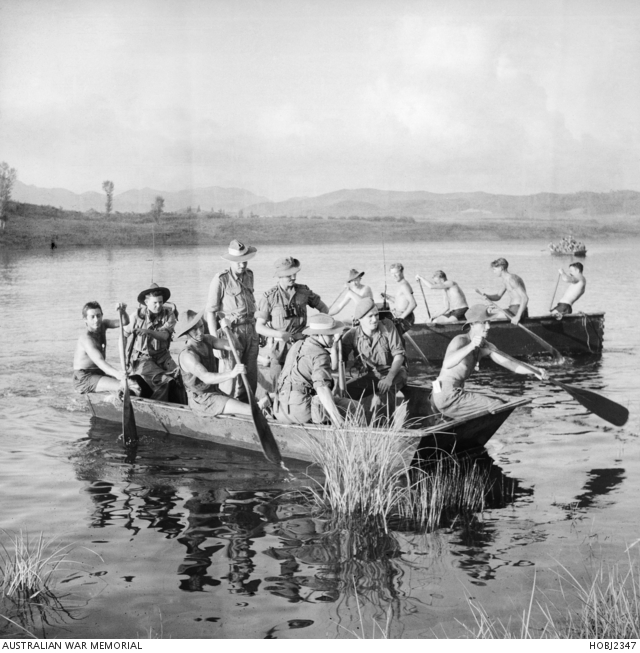
A combined Australian and New Zealand patrol crosses a river

=== Naval forces ===
On 29 June 1950, just four days after 135,000 North Korean troops crossed the 38th parallel in Korea, the New Zealand government ordered two Loch class frigates of the Royal New Zealand, HMNZ Tutira and HMNZ Pukaki to prepare to sail to Korean waters. For the whole of the war, at least two NZ vessels were set to be stationed in the theatre. On 3 July, these two first ships left Devonport Naval Base, Auckland and joined other Commonwealth forces at Sasebo, Japan, on 2 August. These vessels served under the command of a British flag officer (seemingly Flag Officer, Second-in-Command, Far East Fleet) and formed part of the US Navy screening force during the Battle of Inchon, performing shore raids and inland bombardment. Further RNZN Loch class frigates joined these later – HMNZ Rotoiti, HMNZ Hawea, HMNZ Taupo and HMNZ Kaniere, as well as a number of smaller craft. Only one RNZN sailor, Able Seaman R.E. Marchioni, was killed throughout the conflict; during a raid on Sogon-ni on 26 August 1951 with HMNZS Rotoiti.

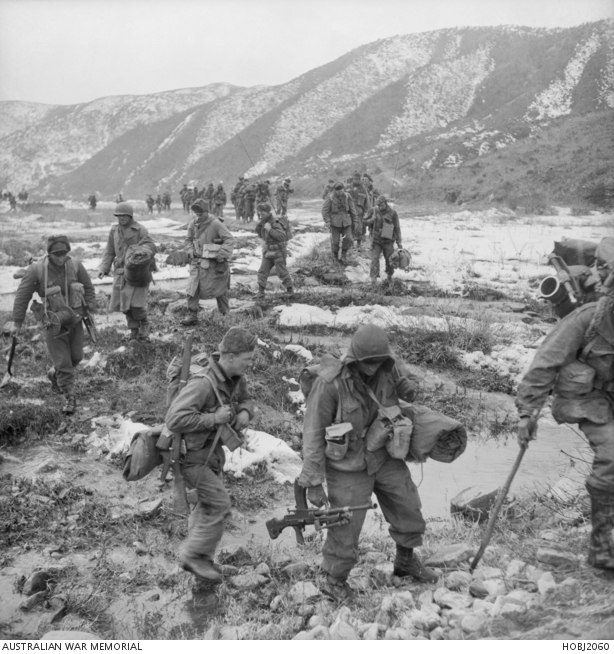
New Zealand Artillerymen alongside US and Australian troops, moving up to a position on Hill 523, preparatory to an attack on Hill 614 the next day, during Operation Killer.

=== Air forces ===
No Royal New Zealand Air Force units were sent to Korea, but a number of New Zealanders flew with other air forces in the conflict. Two men flew Gloster Meteor jets with No. 77 Squadron RAAF. One New Zealand born pilot, Vance Drummond, flying with the Royal Australian Air Force was also captured and incarcerated in a North Korean prisoner of war camp, for nearly two years, when he was shot down near P'yongyang. Drummond was eventually released upon the signing of the armistice after almost two years.

A New Zealand Army artillery lieutenant was attached to a USAF tactical control unit as an observer in light aircraft. New Zealand born Alan Boxer, later a British air marshal, flew B-29 Superfortress missions on USAF attachment. One New Zealander flying in Korea as a lieutenant in the British Royal Navy from HMS Ocean, Cedric Macpherson, was killed on 11 February 1953 when his Hawker Sea Fury was shot down by ground fire. Five New Zealanders took part in Royal Australian Navy missions over Korea from the Australian carrier HMAS Sydney. Some of these pilots were former RNZAF members, others joining directly the British and Australian forces.

== Perceptions of Korea ==
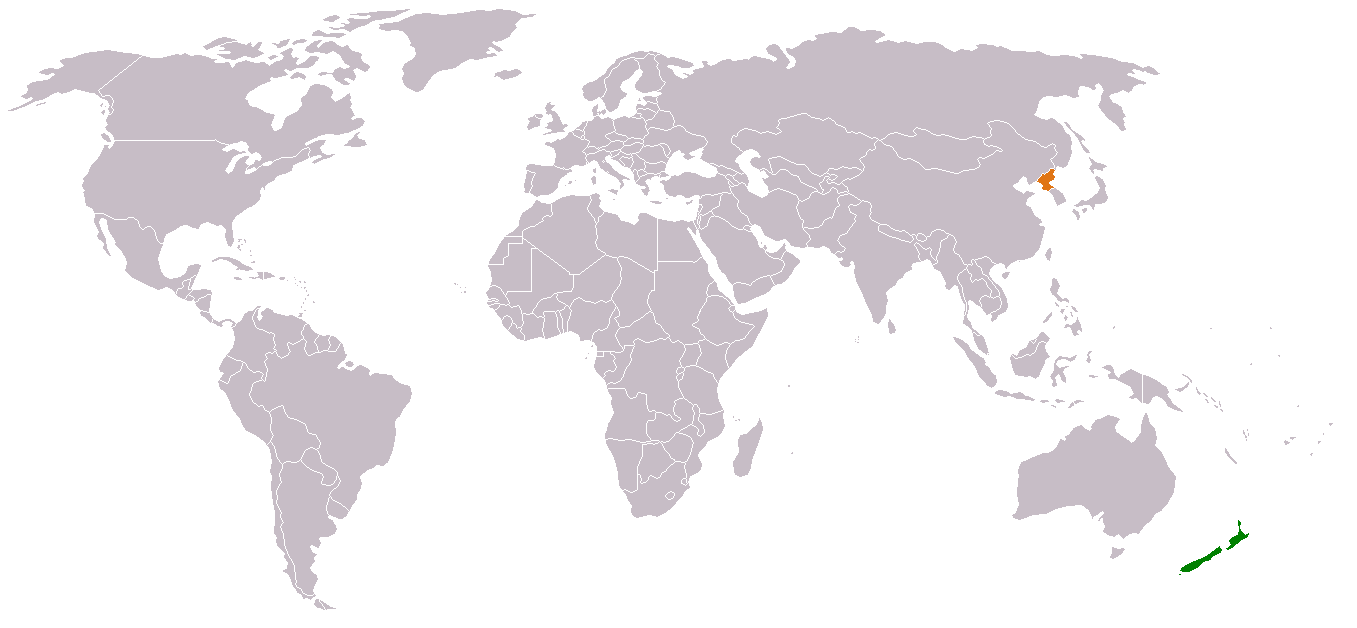
North Korea & New Zealand

New Zealand service people knew very little about Korea before arriving to serve. Many New Zealanders who volunteered, did so for the sense of adventure and opportunity to travel overseas. Due to the language barriers between English speaking New Zealanders and Korean speaking locals, Kayforce members had very little friendship with the South Korean people.

The incredibly cold temperatures in Korea's winter were felt by members of the Kayforce. The New Zealand Army uniform was not equipped for the freezing conditions and Kayforce men were urged to borrow warmer clothing from their Allied troops (Canada, Britain and America) until more appropriate clothes were sent from New Zealand.

== Kayforce figures ==
=== Alan Cull ===
Born on 28 March 1924 in Palmerston North, Alan Cull was the Kayforce Dentist. Studying dentistry at the University of Otago, Cull later worked at Wellington Hospital before joining the army as a reserve dental officer in the Territorial Dental Corps. His enlistment was appealed by his employer, Wellington Hospital Board, but was later withdrawn. Cull served two years in Korea in a Mobile Dental Unit associated with a field artillery regiment. Cull left Wellington on 10 December 1950 on the Ormonde. Cull arrived on 31 December to freezing temperatures in Pusan and worked out of old schoolhouses, tents and trucks. Cull became lead of 2 Mobile Dental Unit in the territorials and was appointed major, treating the local Korean people when he could. In 1953, Queen Elizabeth II presented Cull with a MBE during her first visit to New Zealand. In March 2024, Alan Cull celebrated his 100th birthday.

=== Ian Mackley ===
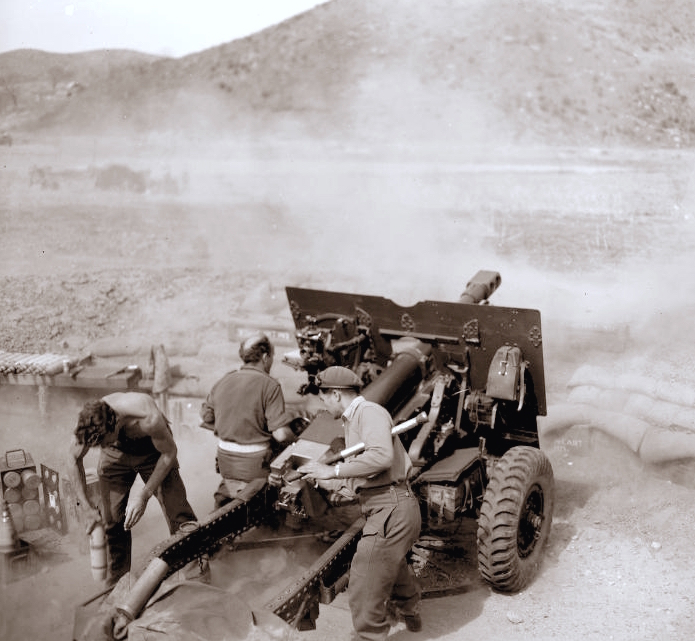
Gun crew go into action. Photograph taken in Korea, 1 April 1952, by Ian Mackley

Born in Masterton in 1928, Mackley joined the Royal New Zealand Air Force at 18 years old. He was a keen photographer from an early age, his first job being at a Kodak shop. Mackley was able to use his skill in photography during his time in the air force, taking aerial photographs for land surveying as well as documenting his fellow recruits during their medical examinations. He left Wellington on 10 December 1950 on the Ormonde. Mackley served with Charlie Troop, 162 Battery as a signaller for three months before he was appointed sergeant and the Kayforce's official photographer. This position required Mackley to travel between Korea to photograph and then to the Kayforce base in Kure, Japan to process and print film. The purpose of these photographs were not for news or documentary purposes but to showcase New Zealand soldiers in action, for public relations. After the Korean War, Mackley continued photographing, working for the Evening Post for 35 years and became President of the Wellington branch of the Korean Veterans Association. Mackley died on 24 April 2016 at 87 years old.

=== Laurence (Laurie) Valentine ===
Born in 1928 in Milson Palmerston North, Valentine volunteered to join the Kayforce after a friend had informed him he was joining. He left Wellington on 10 December 1950 onboard the Ormonde. He served as a gunner with Easy Troop, 163 Battery and fought in the Battle of Kapyong. Laurie died in January 2012 at age 83.

=== Donald (Don) Hay ===
Born 31 January 1933 in Gisbourne, Donald Hay was an Able Seaman in the New Zealand Navy, heading to serve in the Korean War on HMNZS Rotoiti at age 17. Hay was nicknamed 'Happy' by his navy mates. He noted that during his time serving in the Navy he never actually set foot on the mainland of Korea, remaining on the ship and only going ashore to smaller islands. Returning from Korea in November 1951, later becoming naval relations officer for the Royal New Zealand Navy.

=== John Christophers ===
Born 15 February 1924 in Dunedin, John Christophers came from a family of military service. The Christophers family lost four men in WWI, a book was written based on their story titled, Poppy Boys by Lynley Dear. Due to airsickness, Christophers was unable to continue flying and instead moved to administrative work at the Royal New Zealand Air Force stations in Fiji and Tonga. He left Wellington for Korea on 10 December 1950 onboard the Ormonde. Christophers was posted to 162 Battery and Dog Troop as well as being a technical assistant gunner, fighting in the Battle of Kapyong. Christophers recalled South Korean president, Syngman Rhee gave them a presidential unit citation to acknowledge their efforts. Christophers' experiences during the Korean War are referenced in the Firth Tower Museum in Matamata.

=== Keith Hall ===
Born in 1928 in the Auckland suburb of Point Chevalier, Keith Hall was an engineer in the Kayforce. He volunteered for the Korean War at 22 years old alongside his friends, embarking on 10 December 1950 onboard the Ormonde. Due to a background in plumbing, Hall was posted to the engineers of which there was about 12-15. The group later worked with both the Canadian and British 55 Field Squadron Royal Engineers. Hall laid and disarmed minefields, and was given an MID (mentioned in dispatches) for his minefield work.

=== Isaac Kemp ===
Isaac Kemp (Ngāti Porou, Te Aupōuri) was born in 1928 in Te Araroa, himself and his two sisters were fostered, while his older brother left home, after the death of his mother. Kemp recalls reuniting in Korea with his brother, Sydney Kemp, after 20 years after finding out he was stationed at a neighbouring camp. Kemp was a gunner for Able Troop, 161 Battery and recalls the camaraderie within New Zealand forces between Māori and Pākehā in the Kayforce. He stayed on to complete a second term in Korea in 1952 and was discharged from the army in May 1955. Kemp died in August 2012, age 84.

=== Robert (Bob) Knight ===
Born 1930 in Waipawa, Knight was a quartermaster with the navy and left to Korea onboard HMNZS Hawea, leaving in February 1951. The Hawea surveyed the Han River and Knight was responsible for the 4-inch magazine, or ammunition store. Knight was also involved with the Hawea Rugby team that played against American and British troops from HMS Ladybird. Knight arrived back to New Zealand at the Devonport naval base in March 1952. He died in September 2011 at age 81.

=== Wiremu (Bill) Keiha ===
Born in 1930 in Gisbourne, Keiha (Rongowhakaata, Te Aitanga-a-Mā haki) was a signalman, 7th reinforcements. Son of Kingi Areta of the 28 Māori Battalion, attempted to enlist twice in Wairoa and Hakwes Bay, being rejected both times. Eventually enlisting successfully, Keiha travelled alongside troops from the Commonwealth, he recalls being the only New Zealander on board. He arrived in Seoul nearing the tail end of the war, on 3 July 1953 and was only in action for 24 days. Keiha stayed in Korea after the armistice was announced, joining the George Troop and working to build roads with a bulldozer until New Zealand troops were withdrawn in 1954.

=== Richard (Dick) Horner ===
Born in New Plymouth in 1926, Horner was a driver and mechanic in the workshop platoon, 10 company in the RNZASC. He was part of Jayforce as a signaller for two years before joining the Kayforce in 1951. Horner sailed to Korea onboard the TSS Wahine which hit a reef off Marsela Island, passengers were taken back to Darwin on a tanker and the TSS Wahine was abandoned. Horner later flew to Japan then travelled by boat to Korea. During his time in Kayforce, Horner repaired trucks, changed tyres, welded and overall attended to mechanical issues.

=== Desmond (Des) Vinten ===
Vinten was a dispatch rider, 3rd reinforcements. He lied about his age and enlisted at 19 years old, later being found out and told to confirm his parents' permission. He travelled on board the Australian MS Wanganella to Sydney, then on the troopship Devonshire to Korea. Vinten served in Korea until the armistice was signed in 1953. Vinten went on to serve in Malaya from 1961-1964.

=== Lindsay Glassey ===
Born in Ashburton in 1930, Glassey was a leading signalman on HMNZS Taupo which sailed to Korea in August 1951. He recalls shelling enemy trains in tunnels and exploding bridges. Glassey returned to New Zealand in October 1952.

=== Norman Graeme Garland ===
Garland was the only prisoner of war held in Korea from New Zealand's Kayforce. He was captive for 18 months before being released at the signing of the armistice. Another notable prisoner of war was New Zealand born, Sergeant Vance Drummond who served in both the New Zealand Army and Royal Australian Air Force. Garland died on 5 March 1988 at age 60.

== Killed in Action ==
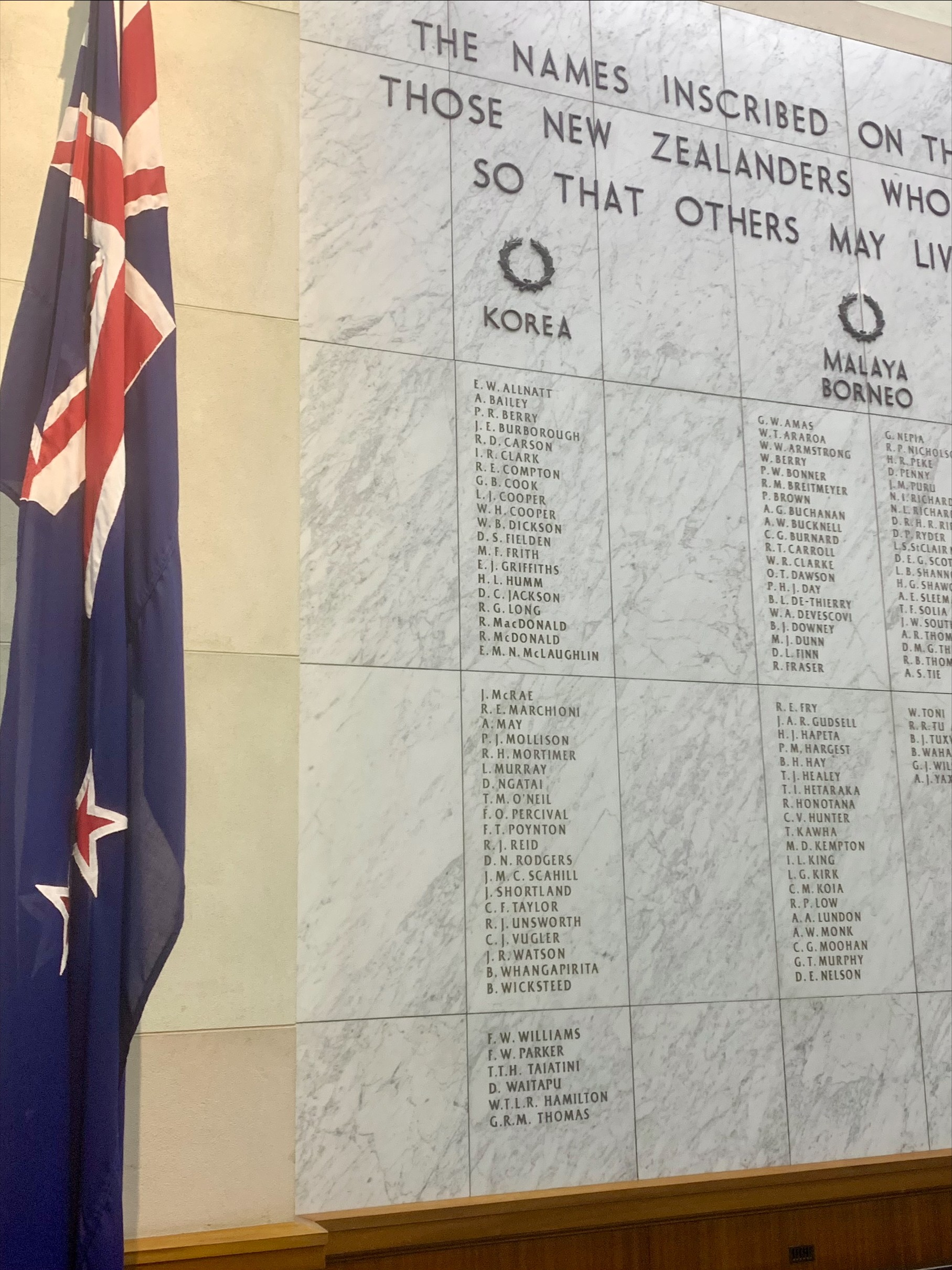
Korean War Roll of Honour at Auckland War Memorial Museum

=== Robert Marchioni ===
Robert Marchioni joined the Royal New Zealand Navy on 13 October 1949 at 17 years old. He was promoted to able seaman on 13 April 1951 and embarked on HMNZS Rotoiti to Korea. On 26 August 1951 Marchioni was killed in action during a raid behind enemy lines. His friends attempted take his body back to the ship, but were unable, instead covering his body in rocks with plans to retrieve it the next day. However the mission to retrieve his body was deemed to dangerous and not authorised, his body was never recovered. Marchioni was the only RNZN fatality during the Korean War.

=== Second Lieutenant Dennis Fielden ===
Dennis Fielden was born 17 November 1918 in England and moved to New Zealand two years prior to his enlistment to Korea. He was commissioned into the Kayfoce after graduating the O.C.T.U at Waiouru. Prior to his service in Korea he has served in an anti-aircraft battery in France, in the Royal Air Force after the Dunkirk evacuation, later flying a tank-busting aircraft in the Middle East, Italy and Yugoslavia and later served with the RAF in Palestine. He was killed in action on 24 April 1951 at the Battle of Kapyong. Part of the 16th New Zealand Field Regiments, Fielden was attacked by Chinese troops. Fielden was buried in the United Nations Cemetery in Busan.

=== Korean War Roll of Honour ===
This lists the New Zealanders that were killed in action during the Korean War.

Name	Rank	Date of death
Allnatt, Edward William	Gunner	26 November 1951
Bailey, Allwyn	Gunner	17 November 1951
Berry, Peter Rex	Gunner	17 February 1953
Burborough, John Ewing	Driver	4 November 1954
Carson, Ramon Deane	Gunner	6 June 1953
Clark, Ivo Raymond	Gunner	5 June 1954
Compton, Robert Edward	Gunner	24 November 1951
Cook, Gordon Brian	Corporal	26 May 1952
Cooper, Leslie John	Gunner	13 October 1951
Cooper, William Henry	Ordinary Seaman	29 July 1950
Dickson, Wallace Bruce	Gunner	4 October 1951
Fielden, Dennis Siddall	Second Lieutenant	24 April 1951
Frith, Mervyn Frederick	Gunner	5 November 1951
Griffiths, Eric James	Gunner	17 February 1953
Hamilton, William Todd Lawson Richardson	Signalman	22 October 1950
Humm, Herbert Lester	Driver	21 October 1955
Jackson, Donald Cameron	Gunner	27 November 1951
Long, Richard George	Warrant Officer Class 2	13 January 1951
MacDonald, Ronald	Gunner	13 January 1951
Marchioni, Robert Edward	Able Seaman	26 August 1951
May, Arthur	Corporal	21 May 1954
McDonald, Ray	Gunner	15 November 1952
McKandry, John Lawrence	Private	14 May 1953
McLaughlin, Edward Michael Noel	Sergeant	30 November 1954
McRae, John	Gunner	3 May 1953
Mollison, Peter James	Telegraphist	29 October 1957
Mortimer, Raymond Herbert	Gunner	14 September 1952
Murray, Lyn	Sergeant	27 December 1952
Ngatai, Dickson	Signalman	28 January 1953
O'Neil, Thomas Mervyn	Gunner	13 September 1952
Parker, Frederick William	Corporal	17 March 1953
Percival, Frank Osmond	Signalman	6 December 1951
Poynton, Frederick Terence	Lance Corporal	15 September 1951
Quintall, Brian Charles	Private	10 September 1952
Reid, Reginald James	Sergeant	3 May 1953
Rodgers, Douglas Neville	Driver	27 December 1953
Scahill, James Martin Conrad	Gunner	18 November 1951
Shortland, Joseph	Lance Bombardier	17 February 1953
Taiatini, Thomas Te Hau	Able Seaman	23 August 1955
Taylor, Colin Franklin	Driver	17 May 1954
Thomas, Graham Rangi Morrison	Gunner	29 August 1952
Unsworth, Robert James	Lieutenant	12 January 1953
Vugler, Cedric John	Sergeant	11 February 1951
Waitapu, Dennis	Able Seaman	25 November 1955
Watson, Jefford Rex	Gunner	18 November 1951
Whangapirita, Boyce	Driver	23 June 1952
Wicksteed, Barton	Major	4 August 1952

== Cultural exchanges ==
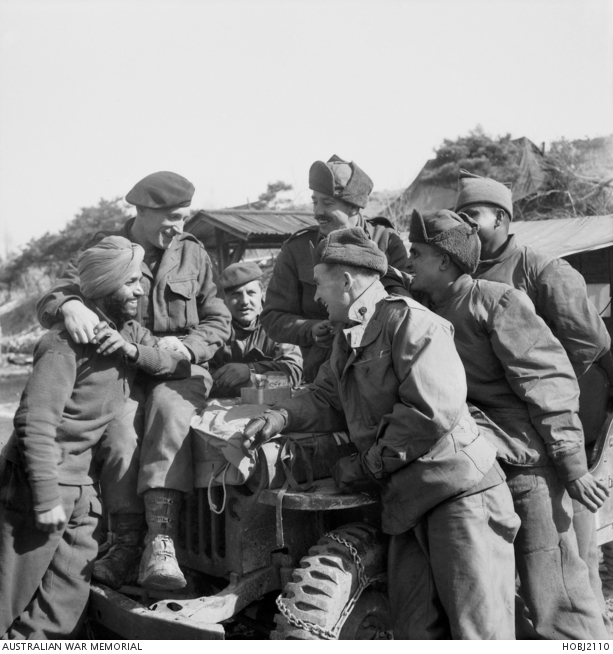
An example of United Nations cooperation. At extreme left and right are Indian volunteers with the 60th Indian Field Ambulance in Korea. Between them are British, New Zealand and Australian soldiers, March 1951.

During the Korean War, it is recorded that New Zealand soldiers taught the local South Koreans the Māori love song, Pōkarekare Ana. It was later translated to Korean and named, Yeon-ga (Korean: 연가). It is still noted to be a popular song among the older generation in South Korea.

Close to 15%, about seventy-eight, of Kayforce members were Māori and unlike World War II, there was no racial separation in place between Māori and Pākeha. Māori culture was experienced by Pākeha New Zealanders, the English, Canadians and Americans, with Māori concerts and haka competitions organised. Comradery between New Zealand and allied Commonwealth troops, English, Canadian, Indian and sometimes, American troops was strong.

Some New Zealand units utilised the help of young local Korean boys to assist with small tasks. Many of these boys were orphaned and trying to make some income. These locals also helped carry ammunition and supplies in between units, at times risking their lives. Many New Zealand soldiers felt great sadness for the Korean people, once face to face with the reality of their living conditions and extreme poverty.

The foundation of the relationship between New Zealand and South Korea is said to be largely due to New Zealand's contribution to the Korean War effort. This paved the way for an ongoing relationship of economic collaboration, political diplomacy and cultural exchange.

== Impact & legacy ==
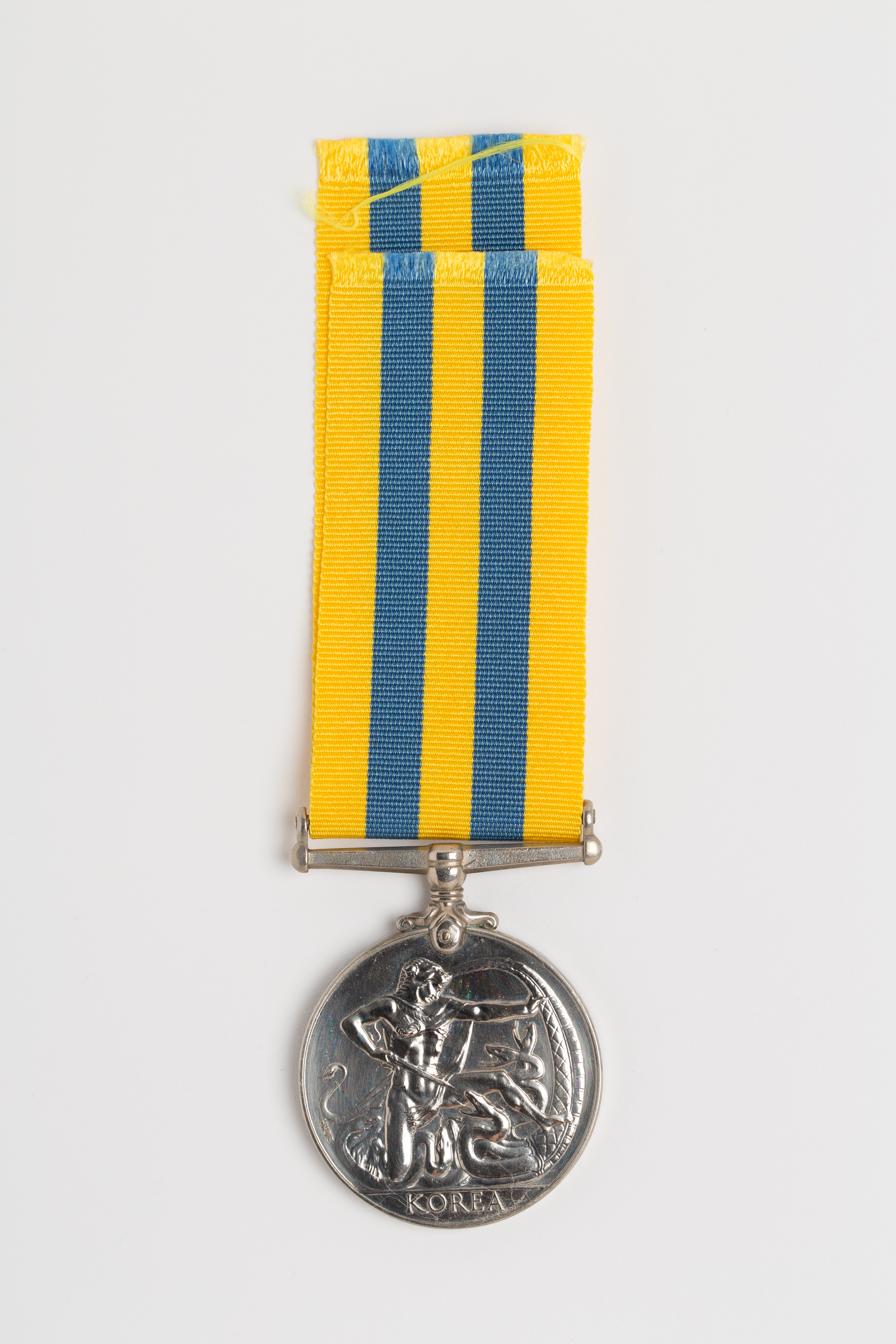
Example of the 'Korea Medal' given to New Zealanders who fought in the Korean War.

The Korean War was noted to have had an incidental but significant economic impact on New Zealand. On the outbreak of war in 1950, the United States were urged to purchase vast quantities of wool. These large amounts of wool were not for uniforms but were strategic stockpiles kept in reserve in case the conflict worsened. The New Zealand wool boom skyrocketed New Zealand to the third largest wool producer in the world.

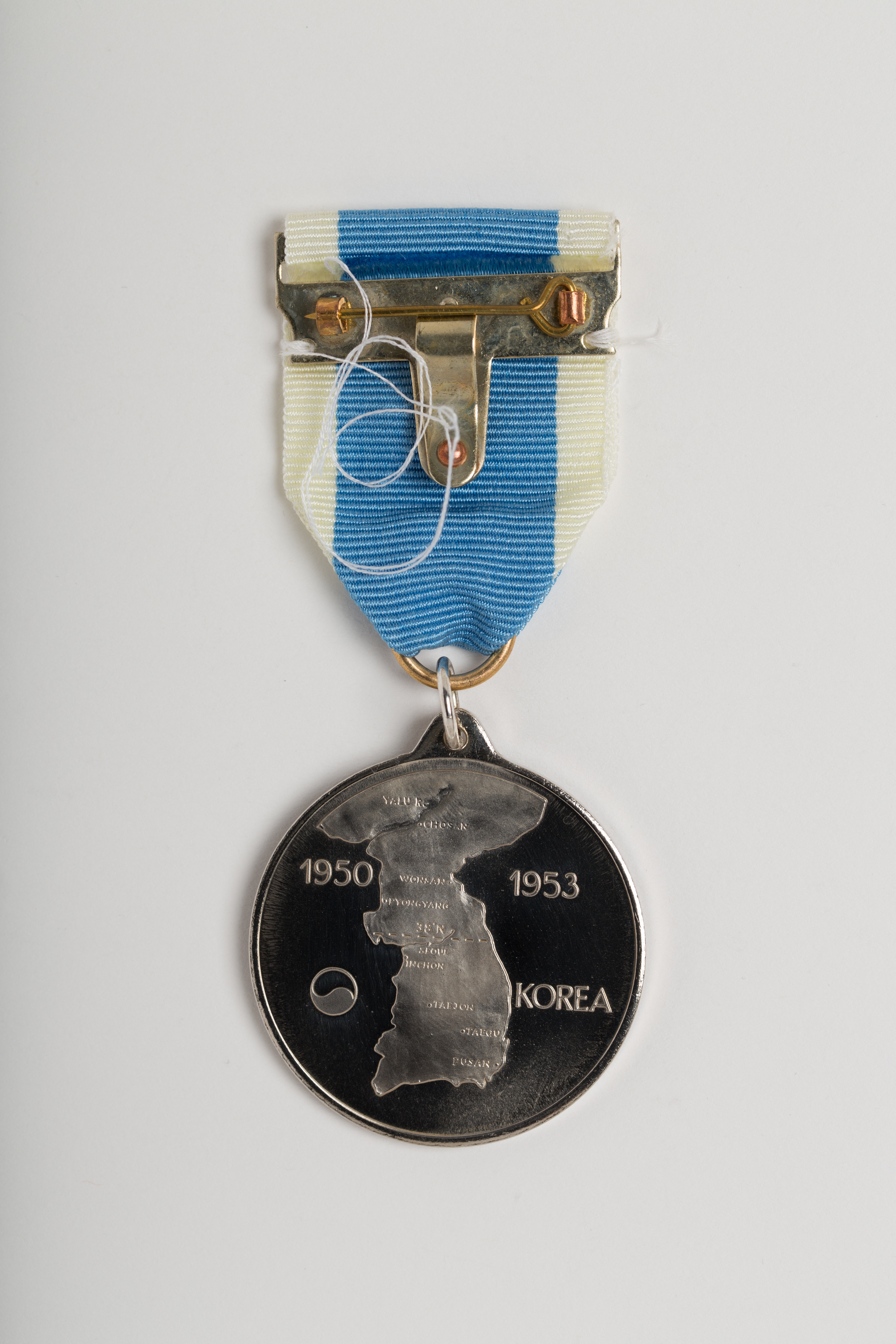
Example of 40th Anniversary Korean War 1950-53 medallion

Soldiers returning home from their service in Korea were not met with the same reception as those returning from World War II. Often referred to as 'the forgotten war' and the 'forgotten force'. During the Korean War, everyday New Zealanders were not impacted by the plight of restrictions or the societal expectation to support the war effort, that came with World War I & II. In turn, the ramifications were less obvious in New Zealand society. That along with the low casualty rate and the lack of threat to New Zealand made New Zealanders disconnected from the conflict. In addition, the 1951 New Zealand waterfront dispute saw New Zealanders more invested in a closer threat of communism.

Commemorations to New Zealand service in the Korean War continue today, with the 60th anniversary of the Korean Armistice Agreement in Busan being attended by Prime Minister of the time, John Key and Michael Woodhouse, Veterans’ Affairs Minister. Again, in 2023, marking the 70th anniversary, five veterans and their families travelled to Korea and were hosted for a week. This included a visit to the Korean Demilitarised Zone, Korean War Memorial and the United Nations Memorial Ceremony.

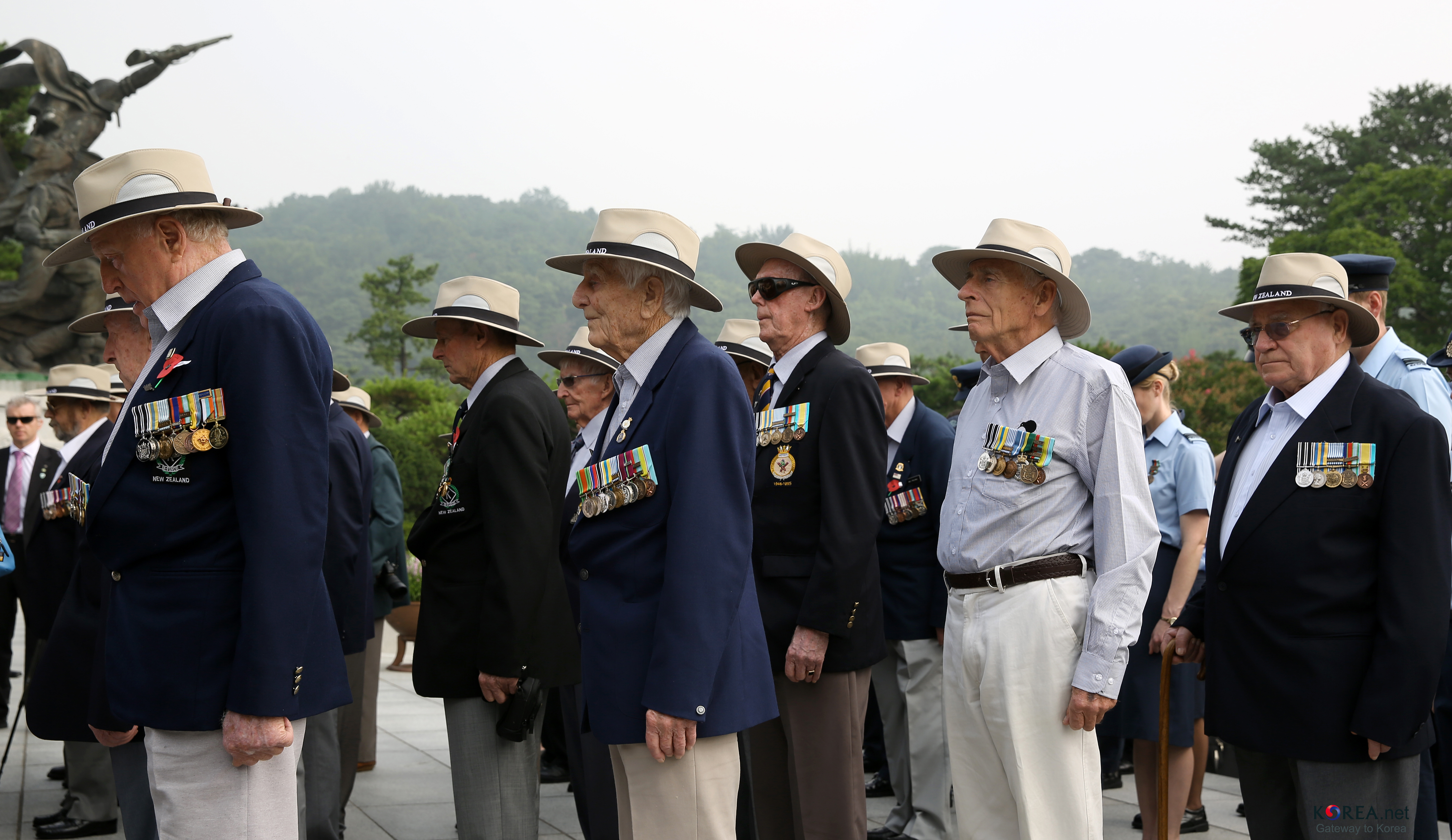
New Zealand Korean War veterans at the National Cemetery of Korea to mark the 60th anniversary of the Armistice of the Korean War. 2013

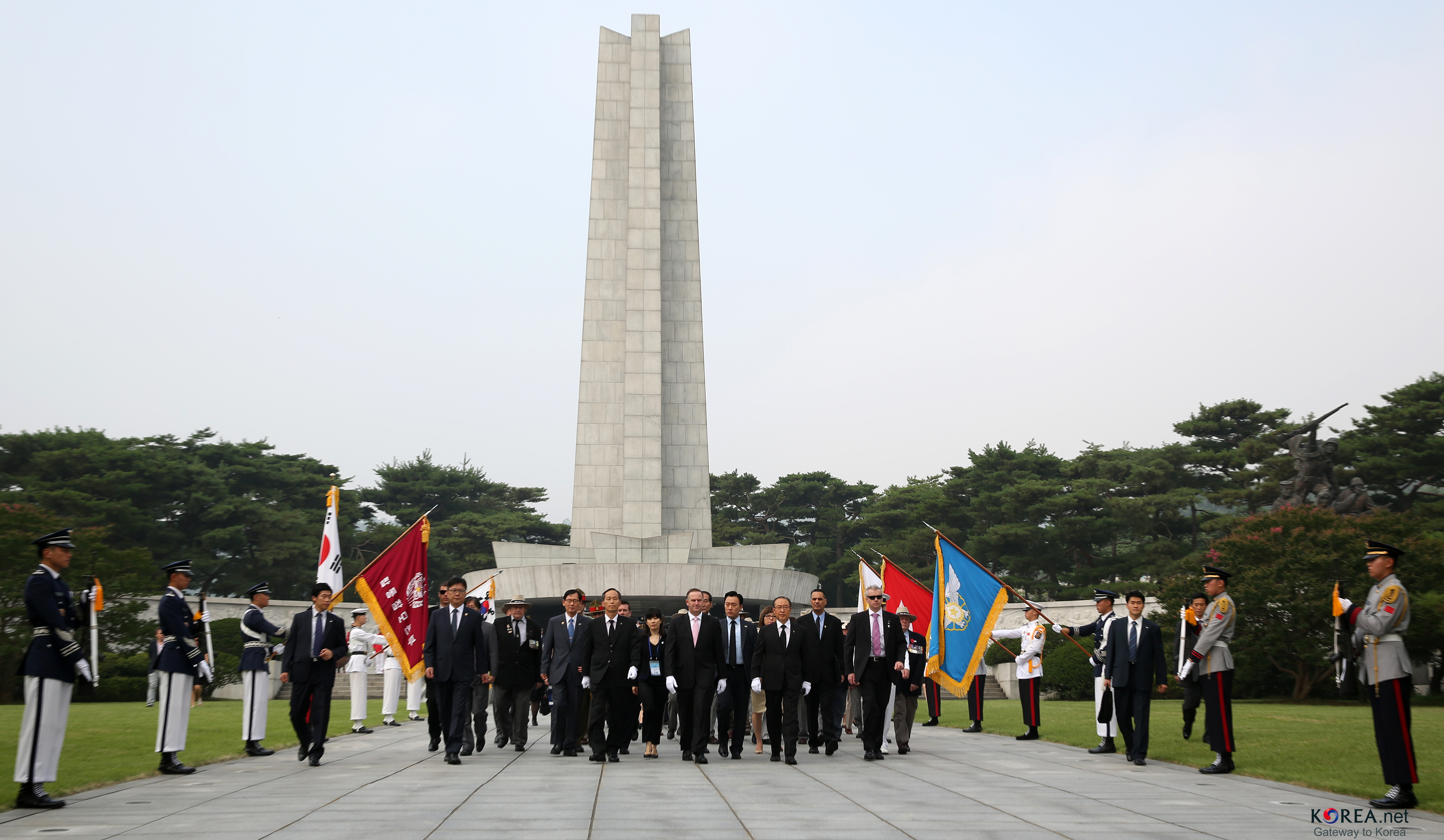
Prime Minister John Key and New Zealand veterans of the Korean War visit the National Cemetery of Korea. 2013

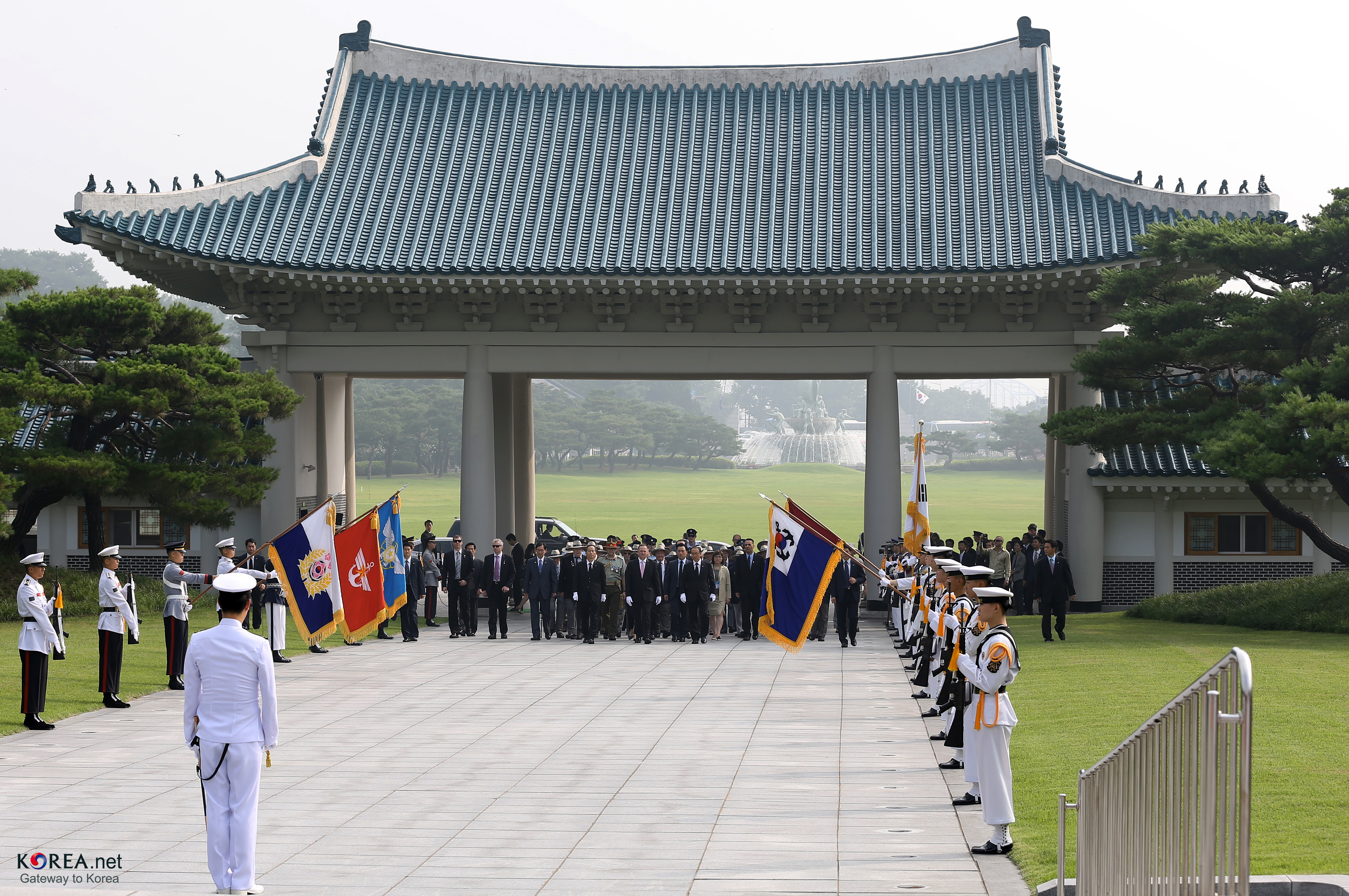
The National Cemetery of Korea, marking the 60th anniversary of the Armistice of the Korean War. 2013

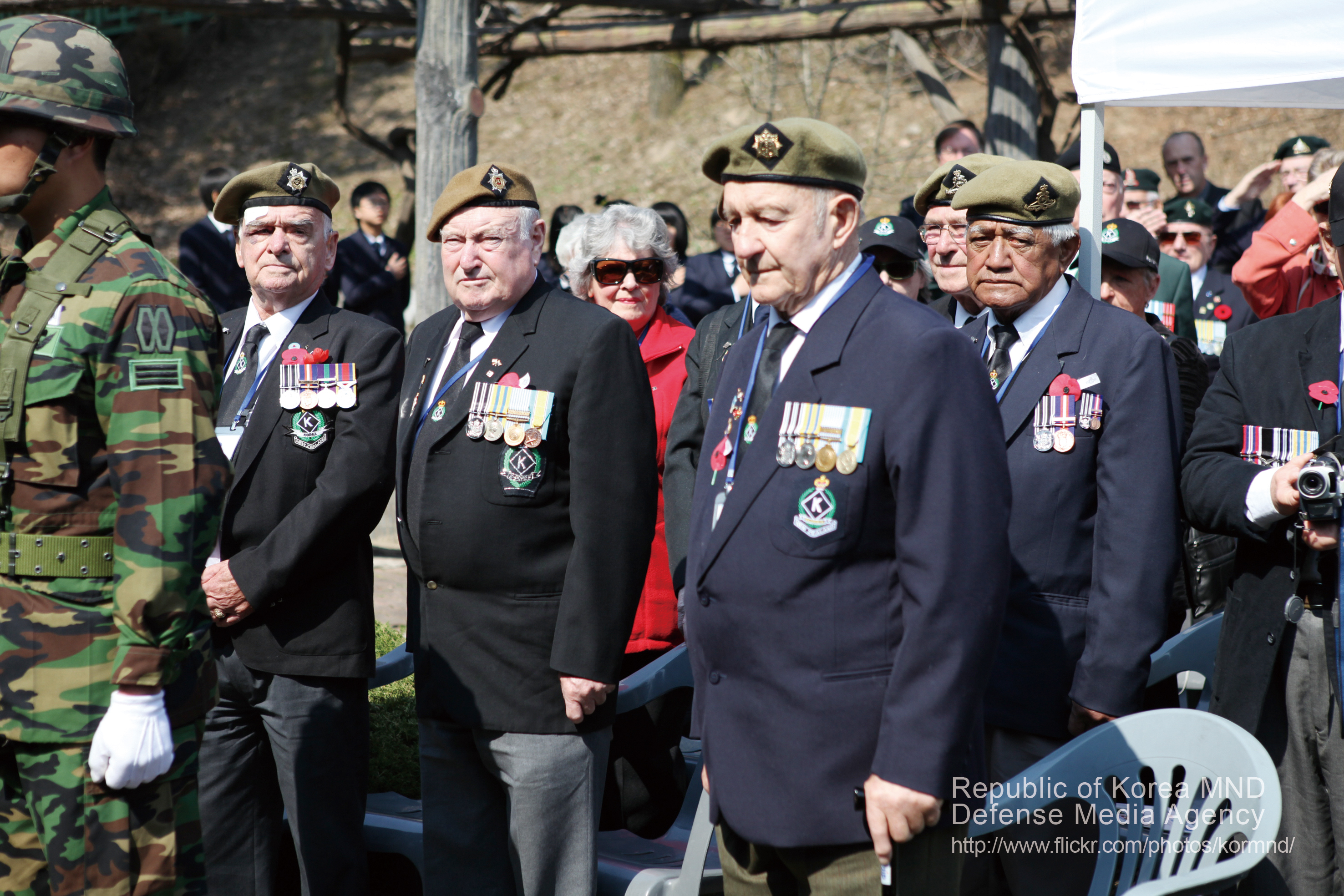
New Zealand veterans at 60th anniversary of the Korean War. 2013

=== Memorials ===
In 1989, the inscriptions of the Korean Roll of Honour were added to Auckland War Memorial Museum's Hall of Memories. In 1992 a Korean War Memorial Stone was unveiled in Auckland's Dove-Myer Robinson Park as a gift from the people of South Korea to New Zealand. Then, in 2005 a New Zealand Memorial Korea was opened. Most notably, in Busan, the United Nations Memorial Cemetery (Korean: 재한유엔기념공원), constructed in 1951 houses the graves of thirty-six New Zealand soldiers. The New Zealand memorial is made of marble sourced from the Coromandel Peninsula and was designed by Warren and Mahoney.

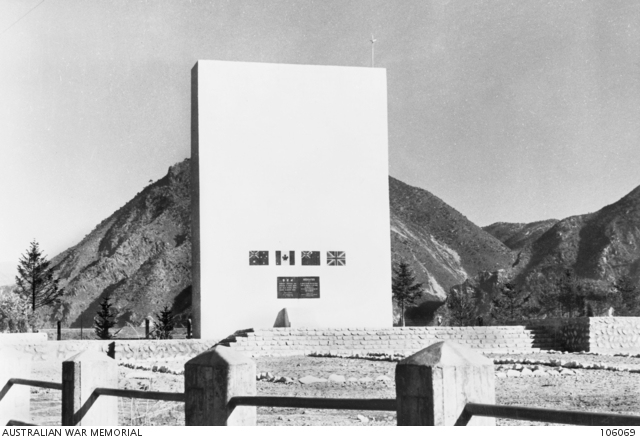
The Korean War Participation Monument Australia, Canada, New Zealand and the United Kingdom, 1967.

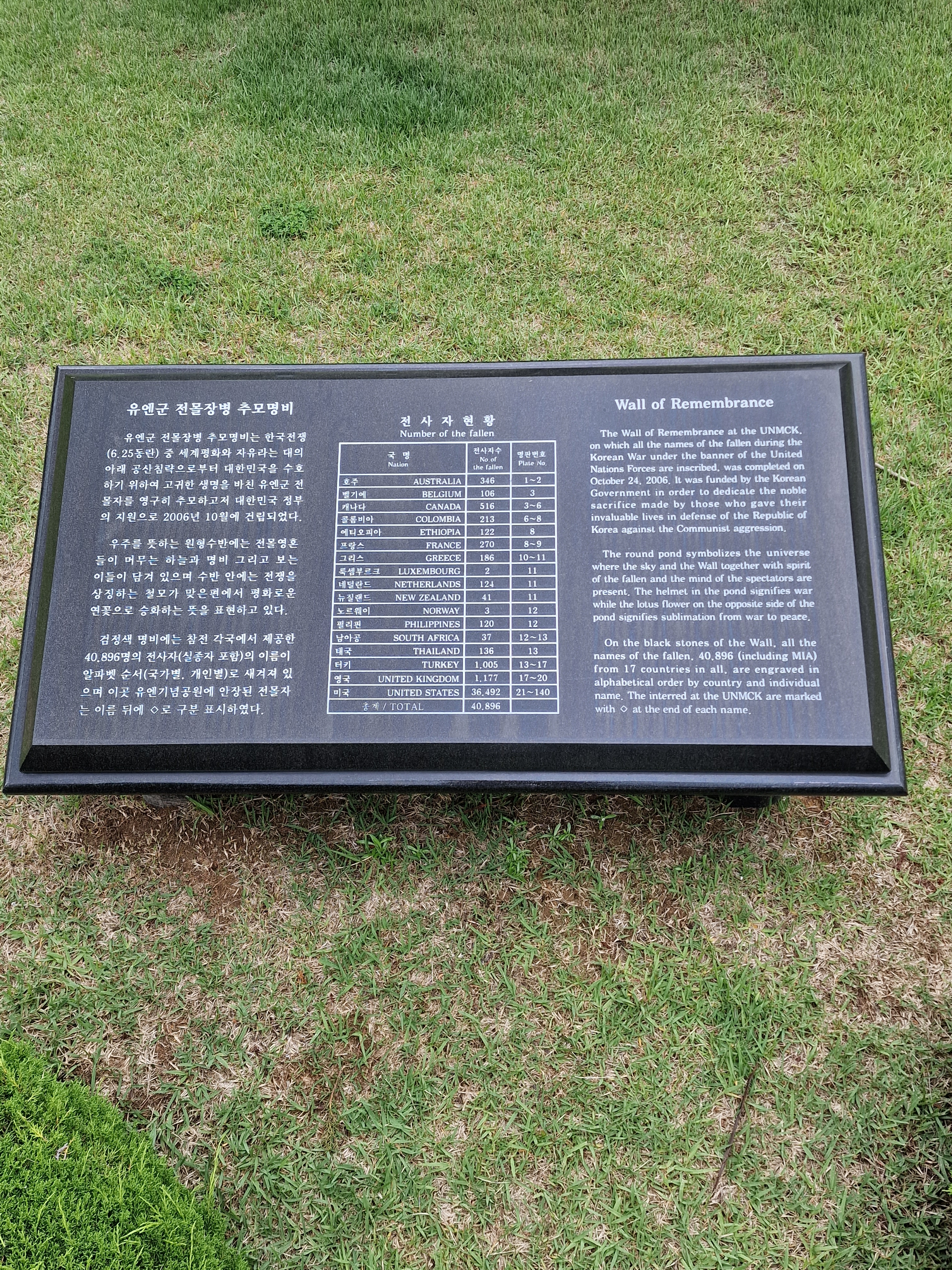
Wall of Remembrance in the UN Memorial Cemetery at Busan

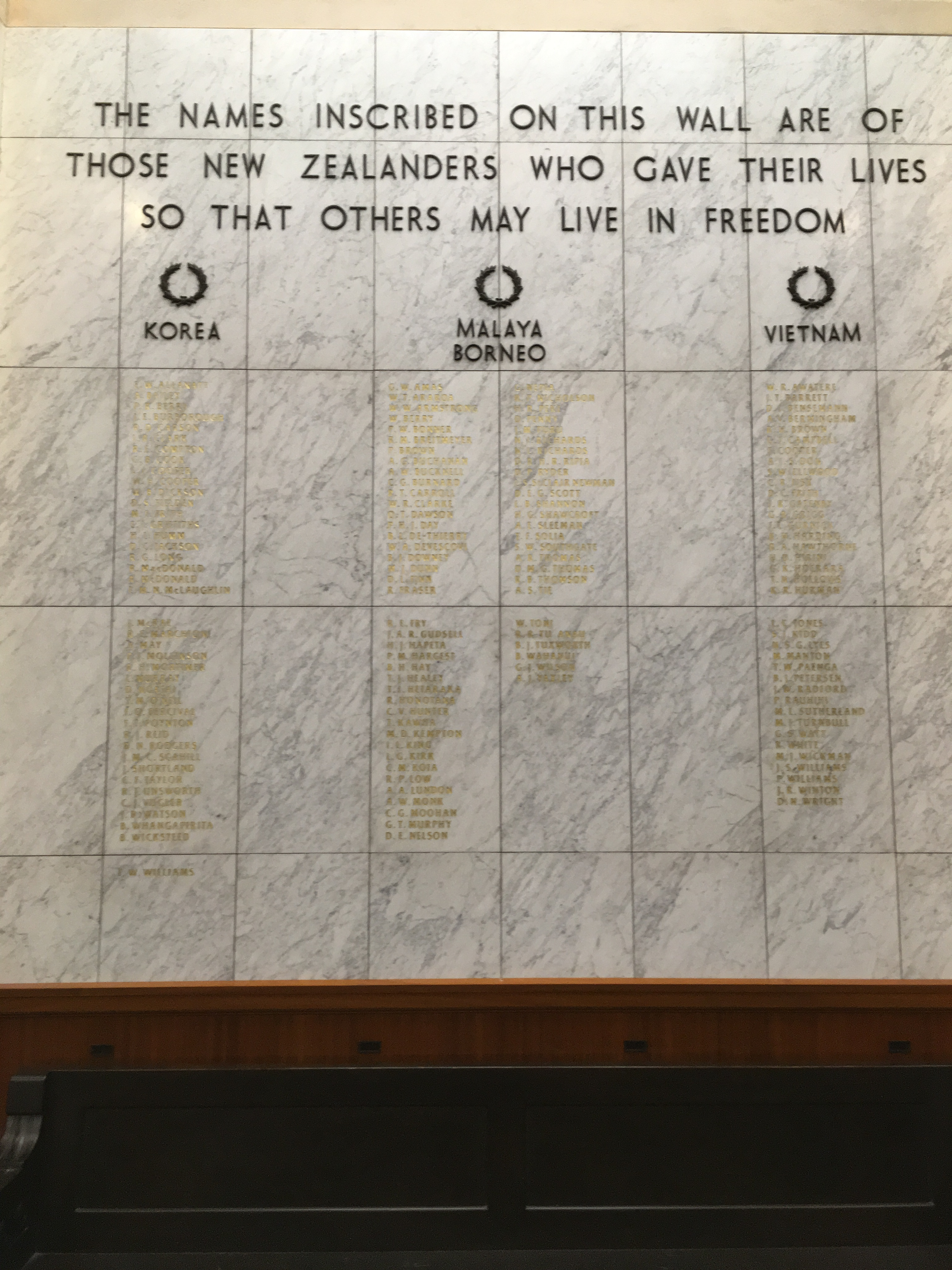
Memorial to those who died in Korea, Malaya and Borneo at Auckland War Memorial Museum.

== See also ==
- United Nations Forces in the Korean War
- Medical support in the Korean War
- United Kingdom in the Korean War
- Australia in the Korean War
- Canada in the Korean War
- Military history of New Zealand during the Korean War

== Korean language further reading ==
- The Korean War and the UN Forces - ROK Ministry of National Defense Institute for Military History, 2015 (E-BOOK) (in Korean)
- The Korean War and the UN Forces - ROK Ministry of National Defense Institute for Military History, 2015 (PDF) (in Korean)
- The Statistics of the Korean War - ROK Ministry of National Defense Institute for Military History, 2014 (E-BOOK) (in Korean)
- The Statistics of the Korean War - ROK Ministry of National Defense Institute for Military History, 2014 (PDF) (in Korean)
- The History of the UN Forces in the Korean War - ROK Ministry of National Defense Institute for Military History, 1998 (E-BOOK) (in Korean)
- The History of the UN Forces in the Korean War - ROK Ministry of National Defense Institute for Military History, 1998 (PDF) (in Korean)
- The Summary of the Korean War - ROK Ministry of National Defense Institute for Military History, 1986 (PDF) (in Korean)
- The History of the Korean War-11: The UN Forces (New Zealand, Philippines, South Africa, Thailand, Turkey, United Kingdom, United States, Denmark, India, Italy, Norway, Sweden) - ROK Ministry of National Defense Institute for Military History, 1980 (E-BOOK) (in Korean)
- The History of the Korean War-11: The UN Forces (New Zealand, Philippines, South Africa, Thailand, Turkey, United Kingdom, United States, Denmark, India, Italy, Norway, Sweden) - ROK Ministry of National Defense Institute for Military History, 1980 (PDF) (in Korean)
