= Featherston Military Camp =

Coordinates: 41°06′30″S 175°21′24″E

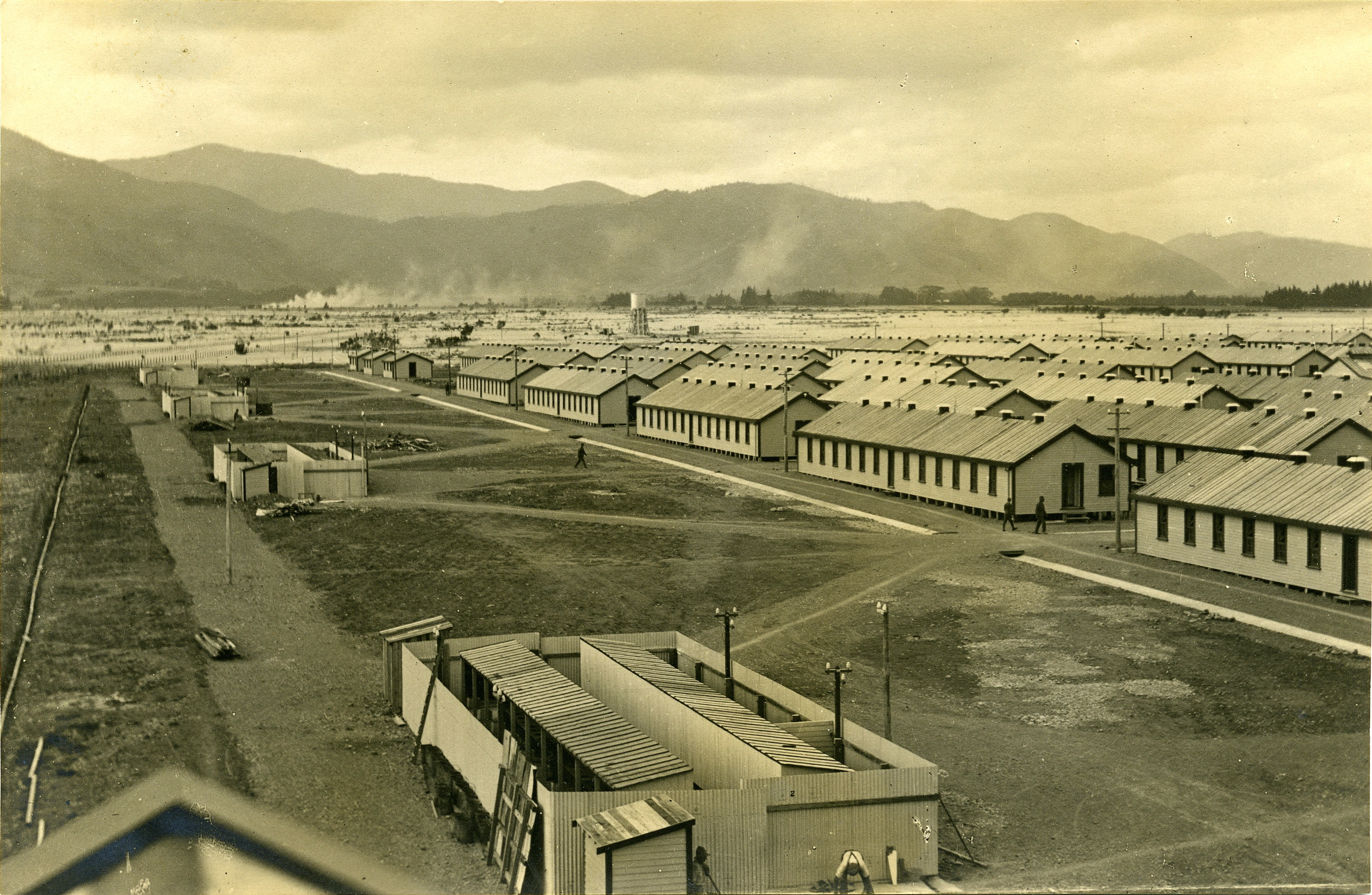
Featherston Camp in 1916

Featherston Military Camp, on a "windswept grassy plain" 3 kilometres north of Featherston, New Zealand, was built after the announcement of National Registration of all military-aged men to supplement Trentham Military Camp on the other side of the Rimutaka hill. The National Registration actually took place in October and November 1915, but the bill empowering conscription by the government did not pass until 1 August 1916.

== 1915 ==
The camp was built in haste in the last quarter of 1915 more than 12 months after the First World War or Great War began. It was then intended to hold 4,500 men. A branch railway line from Featherston, in fact the start of the intended Martinborough branch railway, was a mile and a half long. First, Second etc. streets ran the length of the site and First Avenue, Second Avenue etc. ran crosswise. The first loads of materials arrived by rail in the first week of September 1915. Stabling was provide for 500 horses.

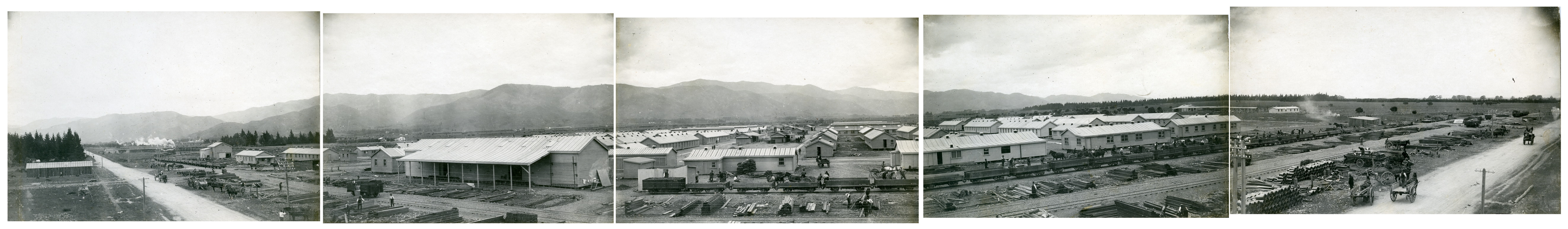
23 December 1915

A larger camp than Trentham Camp the accommodation was also built to a better standard with large windows and all buildings clear of the ground. In the centre of each hutment there was a concrete-built space with a stove and wire netting for drying clothes and gear overnight. The four dining halls were set in the middle of the camp with the cookhouses at the centre. Ablution stands were set nearby. An immense gong made of a railway rail hung from a post.

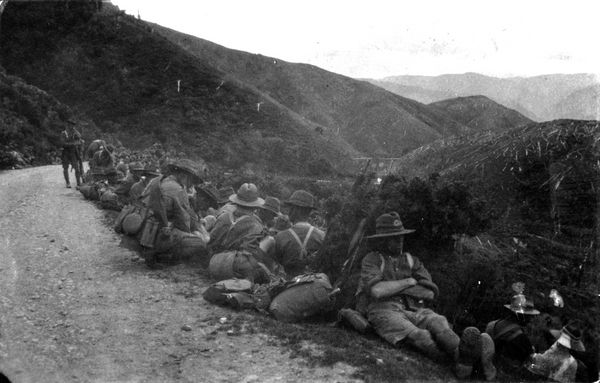
Soldiers resting on the Rimutaka hill road

The large hospital was completed in one week shortly before occupation. Officers' quarters were scattered throughout the camp in small hutments. Two producer gas generators supplied all the electricity for lighting including street lighting. There was a Post Office which opened 29 November 1915, a bakehouse, a milk-house and butchers shop. Buildings were provided for social institutes of the Church of England, Roman Catholic Church and the Salvation Army. Billiard rooms and a shooting gallery were provided. The Troops moved across from temporary quarters at Tauherenikau Camp in January 1916.

"Infantry usually trained six to eight weeks, while mounted riflemen and artillerymen did virtually all their training at the camp. Men drilled and worked at the training grounds close to camp, and route marched and rode further afield. There were associated camps at Canvas Camp, Tauherenikau and Papawai. At times there were almost 10,000 troops in the Wairarapa. When training finished at war’s end, the camp was used briefly as an internment camp, tuberculosis and venereal disease hospital and an ordnance store for equipment from the war. 243 soldiers died during the camp’s operation, with over 160 dying during the influenza epidemic in late 1918."

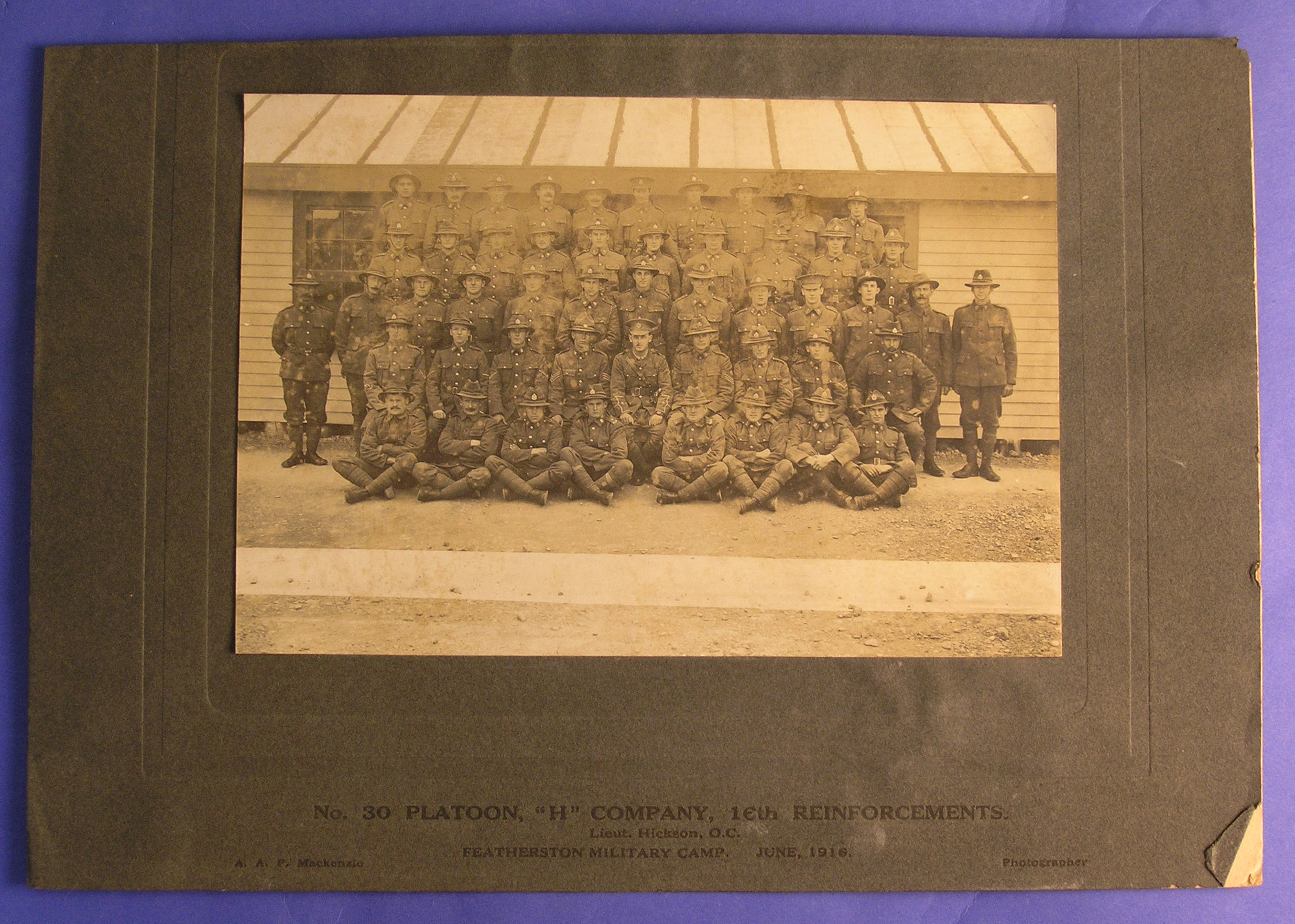

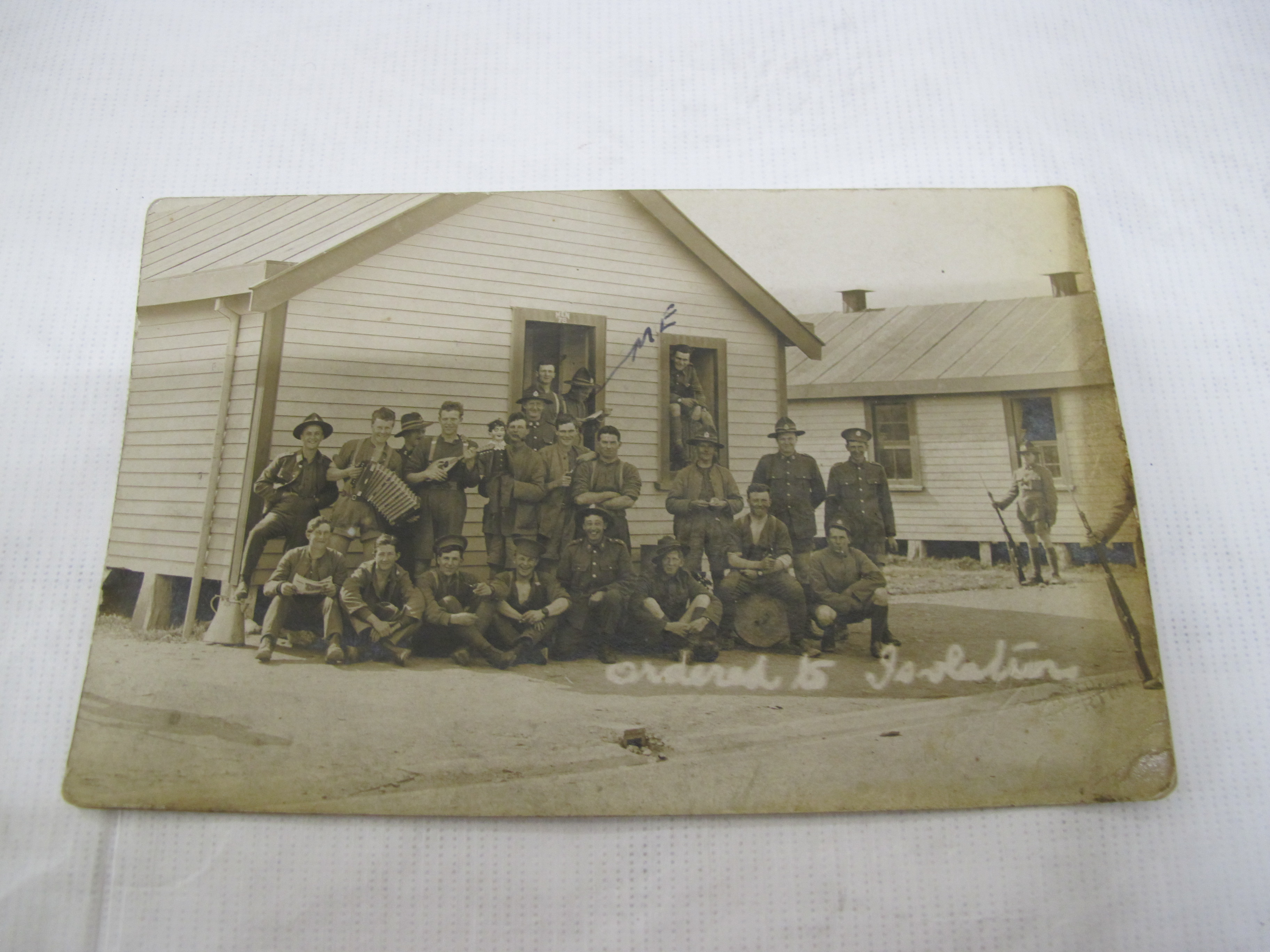

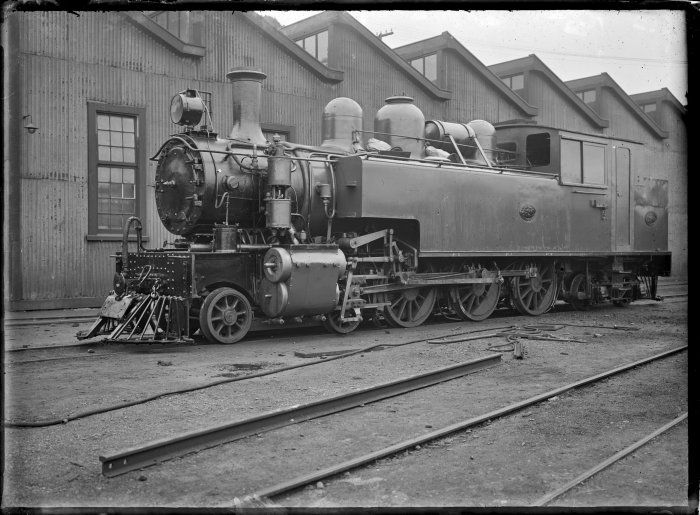
Locomotive modified to traverse Rimutaka Incline to help cope with NZEF wartime traffic to the camp

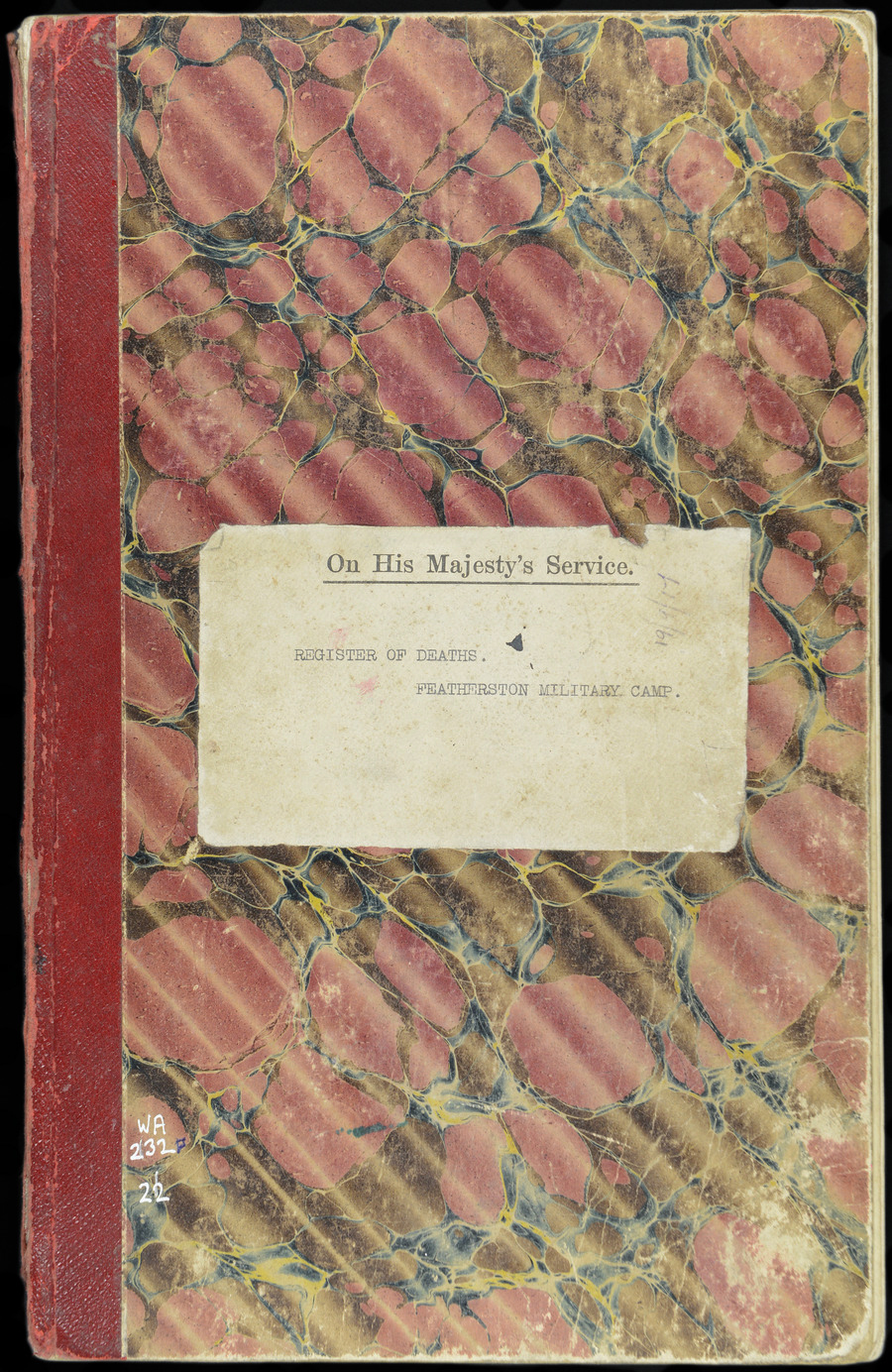
Register of Deaths Featherston Military Camp 17 December 1915 – 15 March 1920

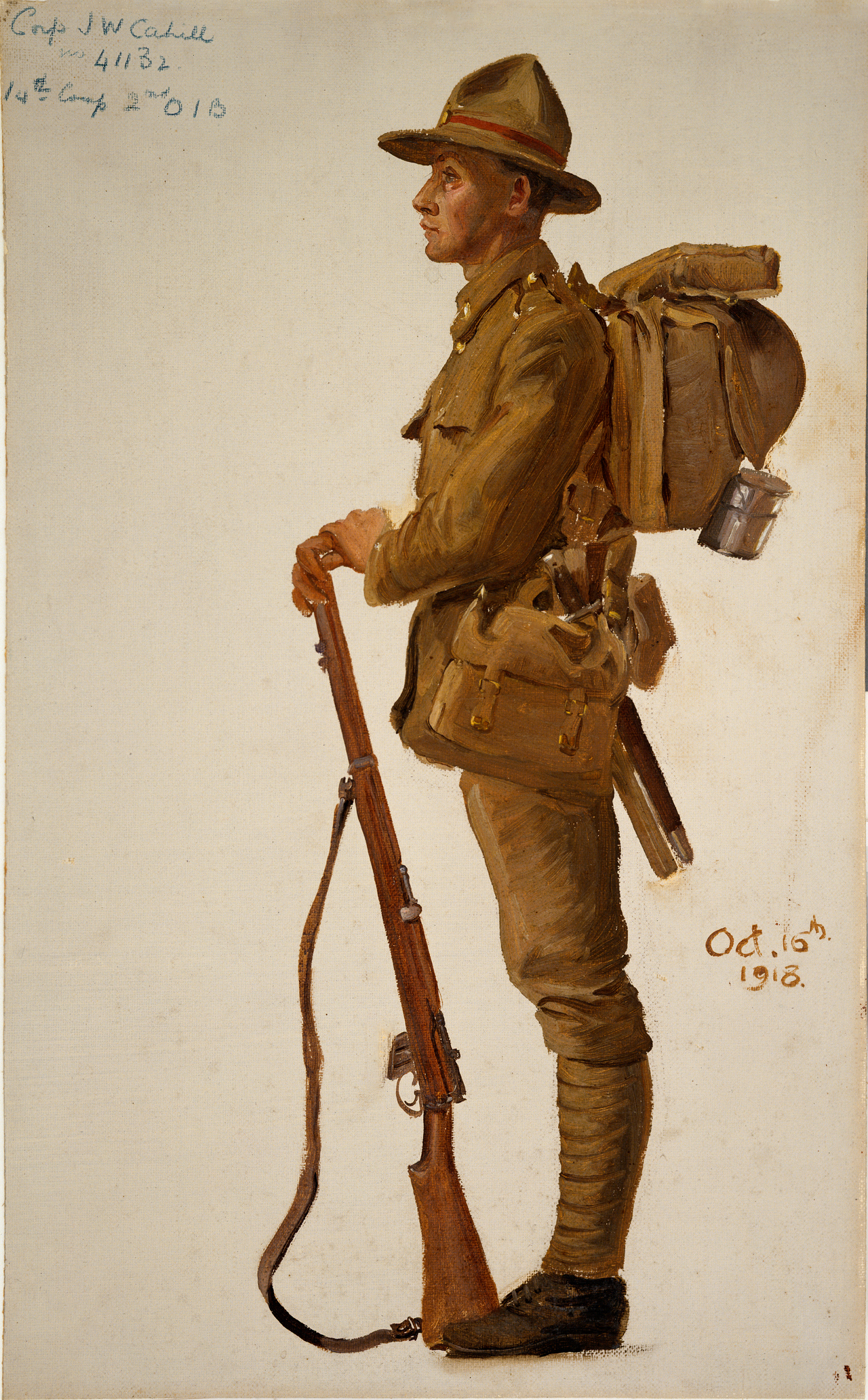
Full marching kit

== Marches ==
During World War I over 30,000 New Zealand soldiers marched between military camps at Trentham, Upper Hutt and Featherston via the Rimutaka Hill Road, in a three-day trek of 27 miles (43.5 km), There were 23 marches of 500 to 1800 men between September 1915 and April 1918, at the end of their training as reinforcements for the New Zealand Expeditionary Force.

== 1922 ==
Buildings demolished by a special contractor produced 50,000 feet of totara, matai, kauri, rimu and hardwood timber auctioned in August 1922.

== 1926 ==
Dalgety & Co were instructed by General Headquarters, Military Forces, Wellington to sell by public auction on Friday 26 November 1926 the following temporary wooden structures with Malthoid roofing:

26 hutments: 36 metres by 6 metres
2 dining rooms: 34 metres by 17 metres
4 stores: 43 metres by 5 metres, 25 metres by 12 metres, 7 metres by 6 metres, 20 metres by 10 metres
Staff officers' mess: 37 metres by 6 metres
workshops: 20 metres by 4 metres, 25 metres by 4 metres, 11 metres by 4 metres
orderlies' hut: 37 metres by 6 metres
numerous other buildings
