= Admiral Hogg =

Admiral Hogg may refer to:

- Ian Hogg (Royal Navy officer) (1911–2003), British Royal Navy vice admiral
- James R. Hogg (born 1934), U.S. Navy admiral
- Robin Trower Hogg (born 1932), British Royal Navy rear admiral
