= Flag Officer, Third Flotilla =

- Active: 1979 – 1992
- Country: United Kingdom
- Branch: Royal Navy
- Size: Flotilla
- Part of: Commander-in-Chief Fleet
- Garrison/HQ: HMNB Portsmouth

Commanders
- First: Rear-Admiral Peter G.M. Herbert
- Last: Vice-Admiral the Hon. Sir Nicholas J. Hill-Norton

The Flag Officer, Third Flotilla was the senior Royal Navy appointment in command of the Third Flotilla from 1979 to 1992.

The Western Fleet and Far East Fleet were merged into the single Commander-in-Chief Fleet in 1971. He had three new seagoing subordinates: Flag Officer First Flotilla, Second Flotilla and Flag Officer, Carriers and Amphibious Ships (FOCAS) each commanded by a rear admiral. In December 1979 the post of FOCAS was re-named Flag Officer, Third Flotilla (FOF3).

From 1981-1992 the Flag Officer Third Flotilla commanded the aircraft carriers; amphibious Ships; the Fleet Training Ship; and destroyers not allocated to First or Second Flotillas.

In April 1992, the Third Flotilla was abolished, and the remaining two flotilla commanders became Flag Officer, Surface Flotilla - responsible for operational readiness and training and Commander United Kingdom Task Group (COMUKTG), who would command any deployed task group.

Flag Officer, Third Flotilla (FOF3)
- Ensign of the Royal Navy
- Navy Department, Ministry of Defence
- Reports to: Commander-in-Chief, Fleet
- Nominator: Secretary of State for Defence
- Appointer: Prime Minister; Subject to formal approval by the Queen-in-Council
- Term length: Not fixed (typically 1–4 years)
- Inaugural holder: Rear-Admiral Peter G.M. Herbert
- Formation: 1979-1992

== Flag Officers commanding ==
Included:

- Rear-Admiral Peter G.M. Herbert: November 1979-December 1979
- Vice-Admiral Sir John M.H. Cox: December 1979 – 1981
- Vice-Admiral Sir John M.H. Cox: December 1981-March 1982
- Rear-Admiral Derek R. Reffell: March 1982-August 1983
- Vice-Admiral Sir Richard G.A. Fitch: August 1983-October 1985
- Vice-Admiral Sir J.Julian R. Oswald: October 1985-April 1987
- Rear-Admiral Hugo M. White: April 1987-October 1988
- Vice-Admiral Sir Alan Grose: October 1988-March 1990
- Vice-Admiral the Hon. Sir Nicholas J. Hill-Norton: March 1990-April 1992
