= Peter Woodhead =

Royal Navy admiral

Vice-Admiral Sir Peter Woodhead KCB DL
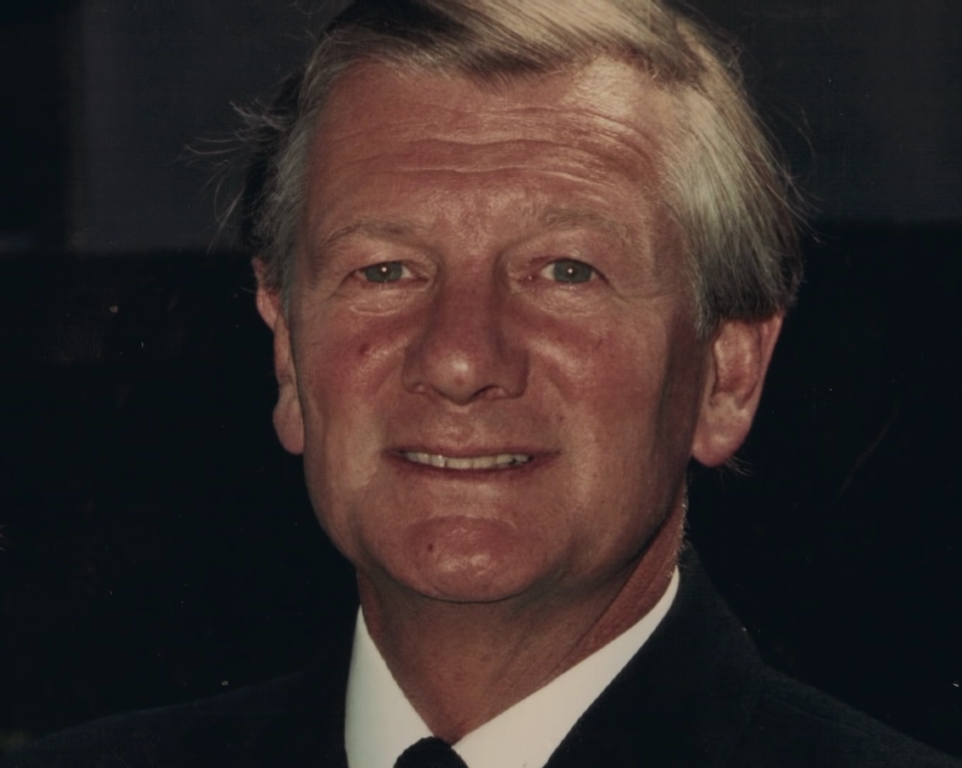
- Sir Peter Woodhead
- Born: 30 July 1939 (age 87)
- Military career
- Allegiance: United Kingdom
- Branch: Royal Navy
- Service years: 1962–1994
- Rank: Vice-Admiral
- Commands: Deputy Supreme Allied Commander Atlantic; Surface Flotilla; First Flotilla; Second Flotilla; HMS Illustrious; HMS Rhyl; HMS Jupiter; HMS Avenger
- Conflicts: Indonesia–Malaysia confrontation
- Awards: Knight Commander of the Order of the Bath

Sir Anthony Peter Woodhead KCB DL (born 30 July 1939) is a former Royal Navy officer who served as Deputy Supreme Allied Commander Atlantic from 1991 to 1993.

== Naval career ==
Educated at Leeds Grammar School, HMS Conway and the Royal Naval College, Dartmouth, Woodhead joined the Royal Navy in 1962. He took part in the Indonesia–Malaysia confrontation in the 1960s. He was given command of the frigate, HMS Jupiter, in 1974 and the frigate, HMS Rhyl, in 1975. Promotion to captain followed on 30 June 1979. Woodhead was recalled from leave and appointed as Chief of staff to the Flag Officer to support the force commander, Rear Admiral Woodward, during the Falklands War. The force had already departed so he had to fly to Ascension Island and rendezvous with the aircraft carrier HMS Hermes there. From 1982 to 1983 he commanded the frigate, HMS Avenger. He was appointed Director of Naval Operations and Trade in 1985, Commander of the aircraft carrier HMS Illustrious in 1986 and Flag Officer, Second Flotilla in 1988. He went on to be Flag Officer First Flotilla, in 1989. From 1990 to 1991 he was Flag Officer, Surface Flotilla. In 1991 he was appointed Deputy Supreme Allied Commander Atlantic, before retiring in 1994 and Rear Admiral Peter Abbott succeeding him. On 31 July 1988, Woodhead met with Prime Minister Margaret Thatcher and her husband Denis Thatcher aboard HMS Ark Royal (R07), while the warship was docked in Sembawang Wharves, Singapore.

=== 1983 helicopter crash ===
On 4 May 1983, HMS Avenger, and sister ship HMS Ambuscade, were on the Royal Navy Armilla patrol, a permanent presence in the Persian Gulf during the 1980s and 1990s. Avenger's commanding officer, Woodhead, was returning from a visit ashore in the ships Westland Lynx, (registration XZ249) when it suffered a tail rotor failure and, nose down, plunged into the sea off Muscat, Oman. The Lynx helicopter never resurfaced from its entry into the sea and for a short time there was no sign of the aircrew or ship's captain. As HMS Avenger approached the crash sight the crew observed some green clothed bodies breaking the surface on the water. When it was suggested to the captain that a Westland Lynx helicopter from the Royal Army of Oman would be taking him and the other three crew members to the nearest hospital in Oman, he informed the medics "there is no fucking way I am getting into that helicopter". Woodhead and the three other crew members survived the incident, with Woodhead sustaining a non-life changing injury to his back.

== Later life ==
In retirement Woodhead became Prisons Ombudsman. In 2003, Alan Travis noted in UK newspaper The Guardian, "Vice-Admiral Sir Peter Woodhead, had his powers so clipped by the former Conservative home secretary, Michael Howard, that the small and little-known club that is the British and Irish Ombudsmen Association refused him membership on the grounds that he was not independent enough". From 1995-2013 Woodhead was the Director of multiple charities and companies including BMT Group, who specialise in Maritime and Naval engineering. Woodhead regularly attends and is involved in the management of St Luke's Church, Prestonville, Brighton.

== Family ==
In 1964 Woodhead married Carol; they have one son and one daughter. Lady Woodhead died in January 2016.

Military offices
Preceded by Sir James Weatherall	Deputy Supreme Allied Commander Atlantic; 1991–1993	Succeeded by Sir Peter Abbott
