= Robin Trower Hogg =

Royal Navy Rear Admiral (born 1932)

Rear-Admiral Robin Trower Hogg CB FRSA
- Born: Robin Ivor Trower Hogg; 25 September 1932 (age 94); Hastings, Sussex, England
- Military career
- Allegiance: United Kingdom
- Branch: Royal Navy
- Service years: –1988
- Rank: Rear-Admiral
- Awards: Companion of the Order of the Bath

Rear-Admiral Robin Ivor Trower Hogg CB FRSA (born 25 September 1932) is a former senior Royal Navy officer.

== Naval career ==
Born on 25 September 1932 and educated at Bedford School, Robin Trower Hogg was Director of Naval Operational Requirements for the Royal Navy between 1982 and 1984, Flag Officer First Flotilla between 1984 and 1986, and Chief of Staff to the Commander-in-Chief Fleet between 1986 and 1987. Hogg retired from the navy on 6 February 1988.

Rear Admiral Robin Trower Hogg was invested as a Companion of the Order of the Bath in the 1988 New Year Honours.
