= Peter Abbott =

Royal Navy Admiral (1942–2015)

Admiral Sir Peter Abbott GBE KCB
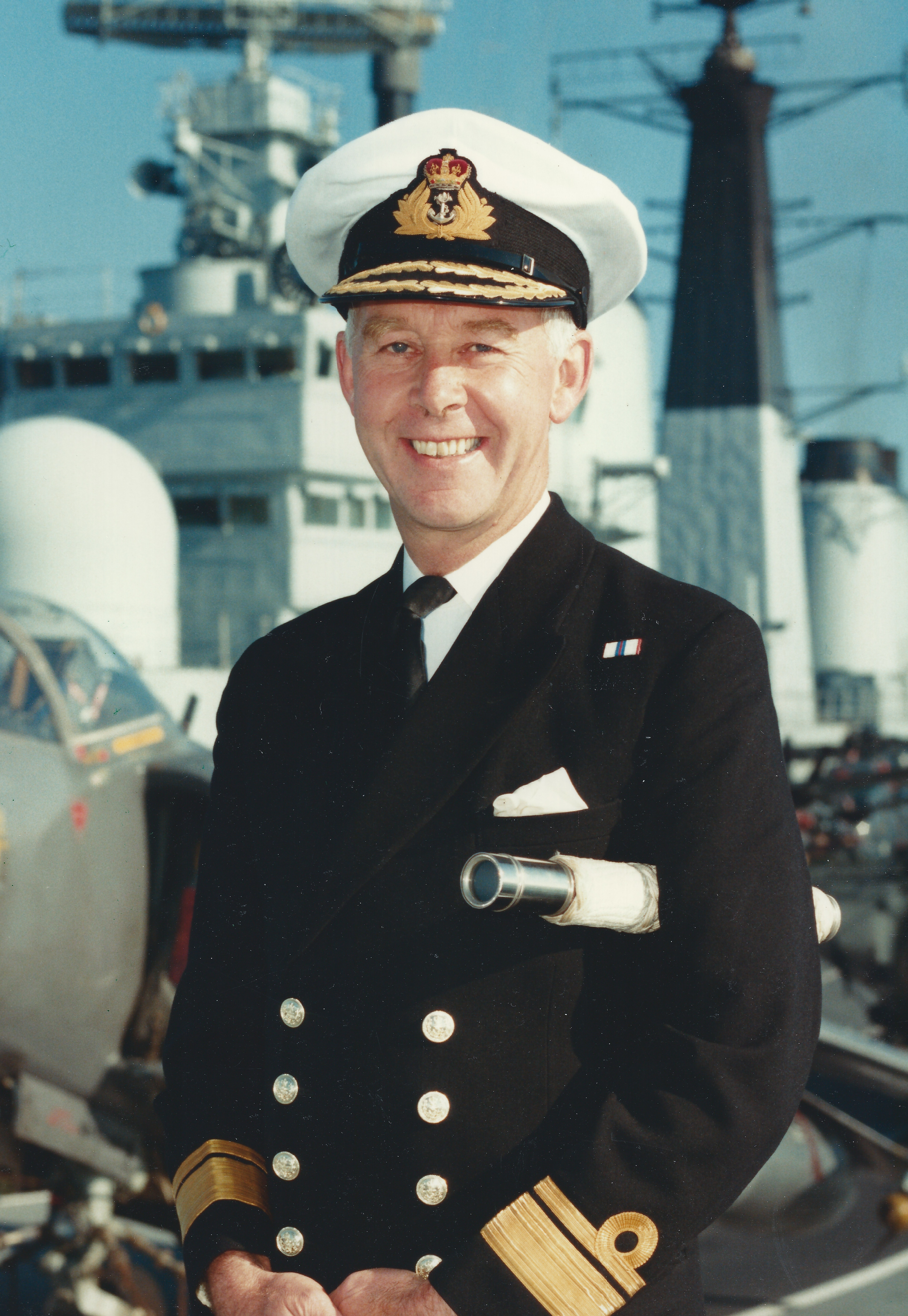
- Then-Rear Admiral Peter Abbott on board Invincible class aircraft carrier
- Born: 12 February 1942; New Delhi, British India
- Died: 28 September 2015 (aged 73)
- Military career
- Allegiance: United Kingdom
- Branch: Royal Navy
- Service years: 1964–2001
- Rank: Admiral
- Commands: Vice-Chief of the Defence Staff; Commander-in-Chief Fleet; Second Flotilla; HMS Ajax; HMS Ambuscade; HMS Chawton
- Conflicts: Falklands War
- Awards: Knight Grand Cross of the Order of the British Empire; Knight Commander of the Order of the Bath; Officer of the Legion of Merit (United States)
- Other work: Commissioner of Commonwealth War Graves

Sir Peter Charles Abbott (12 February 1942 – 28 September 2015) was a Royal Navy officer and Vice-Chief of the Defence Staff of the United Kingdom.

== Early life ==
Abbott was born on 12 February 1942. He was educated at St. Edward's School, Oxford before going on to Queens' College, Cambridge.

== Military career ==
Abbott was commissioned into the Royal Navy in 1964. He commanded the minesweeper HMS Chawton from 1972 to 1975 and then joined the staff of the Senior Naval Officer in the West Indies.

He became commanding officer of the frigate HMS Ambuscade in 1976, second-in-command of the aircraft carrier HMS Bulwark in 1980 and the Chief of Defence Staff's briefer during the Falklands War in 1982. He then became commanding officer of the frigate HMS Ajax as well as captain of the 1st Frigate Squadron in 1983.

He became Director of Navy Plans in 1985 and, having been promoted to rear admiral, he was appointed Flag Officer, Second Flotilla in 1989. He was made Assistant Chief of the Naval Staff in 1991 and, having been promoted to vice admiral, was appointed Deputy Supreme Allied Commander Atlantic in 1993. He became Commander-in-Chief Fleet and, having been promoted to admiral in 1995, he became Vice-Chief of the Defence Staff in 1997.

== Later life ==
In retirement, Abbott was made Chairman of the Trustees of the Royal Naval Museum. He was also President of MSSC, governing charity of the Marine Society and the Sea Cadets.

He died of cancer on 28 September 2015.

== Honours and decorations ==
Knight Grand Cross of the Order of the British Empire (GBE)	1999
Knight Commander of the Order of the Bath (KCB)	1994
Officer of the Legion of Merit	(United States) 1995

Military offices
Preceded by Hugo White	Assistant Chief of the Naval Staff; 1991–1993	Succeeded by John Brigstocke
Preceded by Sir Peter Woodhead	Deputy Supreme Allied Commander Atlantic; 1993–1995	Succeeded by Sir Ian Garnett
Preceded by Sir Hugo White	Commander-in-Chief Fleet; 1995–1997	Succeeded by Sir Michael Boyce
Preceded by Sir John Willis	Vice-Chief of the Defence Staff; 1997–2001	Succeeded by Sir Anthony Bagnall
Heraldic offices
Preceded by Sir Patrick Hine	King of Arms of the Order of the British Empire; 2011–2015	Succeeded by Sir Robert Fulton
