= Henry Leach =

Royal Navy Admiral of the Fleet (1923–2011)

Admiral of the Fleet Sir Henry Leach GCB DL
- Admiral of the Fleet Sir Henry Leach in 1972
- Born: 18 November 1923; Newton Abbot, Devon, England
- Died: 26 April 2011 (aged 87)
- Relatives: John Leach (father)
- Military career
- Allegiance: United Kingdom
- Branch: Royal Navy
- Service years: 1937–1982
- Rank: Admiral of the Fleet
- Commands: First Sea Lord; Commander-in-Chief Fleet; Vice-Chief of the Defence Staff; First Flotilla; HMS Albion; HMS Galatea; HMS Dunkirk
- Conflicts: Second World War; Korean War; Malayan Emergency; Indonesia–Malaysia confrontation Falklands War
- Awards: Knight Grand Cross of the Order of the Bath

Admiral of the Fleet Sir Henry Conyers Leach, GCB, DL (18 November 1923 – 26 April 2011) was a Royal Navy officer who, as First Sea Lord and Chief of the Naval Staff during the early 1980s, was instrumental in convincing the British prime minister Margaret Thatcher that retaking the Falkland Islands from Argentina was feasible. On account of the determination he showed in the matter, journalist and political commentator Andrew Marr described him as Thatcher's "knight in shining gold braid".

== Early life ==
Henry Leach was born the third son of John Leach, a naval officer, and Evelyn Burrell Leach (née Lee). He was educated at St Peter's Court, Broadstairs, and the Royal Naval College, Dartmouth.

== Naval career ==
Leach joined the Royal Navy as a cadet in 1937. After the Second World War started in 1939, he served on the battleship HMS Rodney in the South Atlantic and the cruiser HMS Edinburgh in the Indian Ocean. Promoted to midshipman on 1 January 1941, he was assigned to HMS Prince of Wales. Before he could take up the post, however, his father was given command, so he was reassigned to HMS Mauritius. Mauritius soon went into refit in Singapore, during which time Leach was assigned to the war room there as a plotting officer.

While in Singapore, Prince of Wales was sunk by the Japanese off Singapore, and Leach's father died in this action. His obituary in The Daily Telegraph noted that "[s]urvivors of the action remembered a forlorn midshipman searching for his father, who was among those lost. Only two nights earlier, Leach and his father had enjoyed a gin sling and a swim." His next post was on the destroyer HMS Sardonyx before being promoted to sub-lieutenant on 1 October 1942 and posted to HMS Duke of York, the flagship of the Home Fleet, in January 1943.

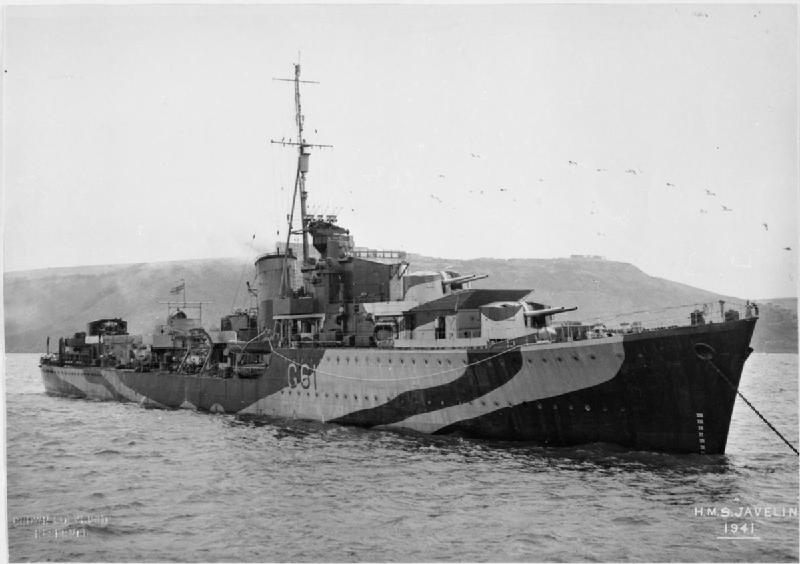
The destroyer HMS Javelin in which Leach served as the navigating officer during the Second World War

Leach was promoted to lieutenant in October 1943. Leach was in command of the "A" turret and he was involved in the Battle of the North Cape in December 1943. In autumn 1944, he was posted to HMS Javelin as the navigating officer. During his posting on Javelin, a mutiny broke out whilst Leach was the duty officer: he "conducted himself well under difficult circumstances" and, after the mutiny was put down, the captain and first lieutenant were re-appointed. Leach was given the position as first lieutenant and the ship was transformed within a few weeks.

In April 1946, Leach transferred to the destroyer HMS Chequers. He was at this post for only a short time as he decided to gain his qualifications as a gunnery specialist at the shore establishment HMS Excellent. After qualifying, he remained at the school as a gunnery instructor until he was posted as gunnery officer to the Second Minesweeping Flotilla in the Aegean Sea. He was promoted to lieutenant commander on 1 February 1952 and attended the Royal Naval Staff College, before becoming a staff officer for the Naval Brigade in London for the coronation of the Queen. In July 1953, he was posted as gunnery officer of the 5th Cruiser Squadron in HMS Newcastle and saw service at the end of the Korean War. He also saw service in the Malayan Emergency of 1955 when HMS Newcastle supported the Army and Royal Marines. He was promoted to commander on 30 June 1955 and served as application commander responsible for bringing the navy's first surface-to-air missile, the Sea Slug, into service. He was then posted to the Admiralty in 1957 and was given his first command in charge of the destroyer HMS Dunkirk in the Mediterranean in 1959.

Leach was posted to the Training Directorate in the Admiralty in July 1961 and then attended the Joint Service Defence College before receiving promotion to captain on 31 December 1961. He became Chief Staff Officer (Plans and Operations) for the Far East Fleet in July 1962 and organised naval support for British ground forces deployed during the Indonesia–Malaysia confrontation. He was appointed captain of the 27th Escort Squadron, which he commanded from the Leander-class frigate HMS Galatea, in November 1965. An appointment at the Ministry of Defence followed when he became Director of Naval Plans there in February 1968 before he was given another command, that of the aircraft carrier HMS Albion, in March 1970. Leach was a strong supporter of the abolition of the daily issue of rum at that time. He was appointed Naval Aide-de-Camp to the Queen on 7 July 1970.

=== Flag rank ===
Leach became Assistant Chief of the Naval Staff (Policy) at the Ministry of Defence in April 1971, receiving promotion to rear admiral on 7 July 1971, and then became Flag Officer First Flotilla in May 1974, with promotion to vice admiral on 6 July 1974. He commanded the flotilla from HMS Blake. He became Vice-Chief of the Defence Staff in January 1976, and having been appointed a Knight Commander of the Order of the Bath in the 1977 New Year Honours, he was promoted to full admiral on 30 March 1977 on appointment as Commander-in-Chief Fleet and NATO Commander-in-Chief, Channel and Commander-in-Chief Eastern Atlantic. He was advanced to Knight Grand Cross of the Order of the Bath in the 1978 Birthday Honours.

Leach was appointed First Sea Lord and Chief of Naval Staff on 6 July 1979 and in that role fiercely resisted naval cuts proposed by Defence Secretary John Nott.

=== Falklands War ===
On 31 March 1982, shortly before the Argentine invasion of the Falklands, Leach brushed aside serious doubts from the Secretary of State for Defence Sir John Nott and addressed the Prime Minister on the appropriate response to any possible invasion. The Chief of the Defence Staff at the time was on his way back from a foreign visit, and in addressing the Prime Minister, Leach effectively bypassed the Acting Chief of the Defence Staff. When he was asked if retaking the islands was possible, he replied "Yes we can recover the islands." He then added "and we must!" Thatcher replied "Why?" Leach exclaimed "Because if we do not, or if we pussyfoot in our actions and do not achieve complete success, in another few months we shall be living in a different country whose word counts for little."

Leach then explained how the task force would take shape and what ships would be involved: when asked about the lack of available aircraft carriers, Leach reassured the Prime Minister that the two small carriers available would suffice. Thatcher approved this and preparations were made to send a task force to set sail to retake the Falklands. On account of his determination, Andrew Marr referred to Leach as Thatcher's "Knight in Shining Gold Braid" in his documentary series History of Modern Britain. Upon his retirement in December 1982, Leach was promoted to Admiral of the Fleet.

== Later life ==
In retirement, Leach published his memoirs entitled Endure no Makeshifts. He involved himself in several charitable organisations and acted as President of the Sea Cadet Association from 1983 to 1993. He was the Chairman of the Council of the King Edward VII Hospital as well as being a chairman of the Royal Navy Club of 1765 & 1785 (United 1889).

In 2004, it was announced that the new Navy Command Headquarters building of the Royal Navy at Whale Island, Portsmouth, was to be named the "Sir Henry Leach Building" in his honour.

Leach lived at Wonston in Hampshire and served as Deputy Lieutenant of Hampshire. His interests included shooting, fishing and gardening. He died on 26 April 2011 at the age of 87. A Service of Thanksgiving held in his honour was attended by representatives of the British Royal Family, including the then First Sea Lord Admiral Sir Mark Stanhope in attendance on behalf of the Queen and the Duke of Edinburgh.

== Family ==
Leach married Mary Jean McCall, daughter of Admiral Sir Henry McCall, in 1958. They had two daughters.

== Sources ==
- Hastings, Max; Jenkins, Simon (1983). The Battle for the Falklands. London: Pan Books. ISBN 978-0330513630.
- Heathcote, Tony (2002). The British Admirals of the Fleet 1734 – 1995. Pen & Sword Ltd. ISBN 0-85052-835-6.
- Liardet, Guy (January 2015). "Leach, Sir Henry Conyers (1923–2011)". Oxford Dictionary of National Biography (online ed.). Oxford University Press. doi:10.1093/ref:odnb/103814. (Subscription, Wikipedia Library access or UK public library membership required.)
- Mahoney, Patrick; Middlebrook, Martin (1979). Battleship; The Loss of the Prince of Wales and the Repulse. Penguin History. ISBN 0-14-023469-1.

Military offices
Preceded by Sir Peter Le Cheminant	Vice-Chief of the Defence Staff; 1975–1977	Succeeded by Sir Anthony Morton
Preceded by Sir John Treacher	Commander-in-Chief Fleet; 1977–1979	Succeeded by Sir James Eberle
Preceded by Sir Terence Lewin	First Sea Lord; 1979–1982	Succeeded by Sir John Fieldhouse
