= Commander-in-Chief Fleet =

British Royal Navy admiral, 1971–2012

- Ensign of the Royal Navy
- Ministry of Defence
- Member of: Admiralty Board
- Reports to: First Sea Lord
- Nominator: Secretary of State for Defence
- Appointer: Prime Minister; Subject to formal approval by the King-in-Council
- Term length: Not fixed (typically 2–4 years)
- Inaugural holder: Admiral Edward Ashmore

The Commander-in-Chief Fleet (CINCFLEET) was the admiral responsible for the operations of the ships, submarines and aircraft of the British Royal Navy from 1971 until April 2012. The command's most pressing challenge for most of its existence was the threat of a third Battle of the Atlantic; perhaps its most prominent war was in the Falklands in 1982. The post was subordinate to the First Sea Lord and Chief of Naval Staff, the professional head of the Navy. In its last years, as the Navy shrank, more administrative responsibilities were added.

In April 2012, the post was abolished. Its responsibilities were taken over by a three-star vice admiral, the Fleet Commander and Deputy Chief of Naval Staff.

== History ==
Prior to 1964 responsibility for British naval command lay with the Admiralty Naval Staff. Following the merger of the Admiralty in 1964 into the new Ministry of Defence the Admiralty became the Navy Department.

In November 1971, force reductions resulted in the Western Fleet being amalgamated with the Far East Fleet. It was to be commanded by a four star admiral who held the title Commander-in-Chief Fleet, with his headquarters at the Northwood Headquarters, Middlesex, England. Previous to November 1971, on 1 May 1971 CINCWF had already assumed responsibility for the administration of ships in the Far East Fleet. From 1971-72 CINCFLEET directed Flag Officer, Carriers and Amphibious Ships; Flag Officer First Flotilla; Flag Officer, Second Flotilla; Flag Officer Submarines; the Hydrographer of the Navy, Rear Admiral Geoffrey Hall (all survey vessels); Flag Officer Sea Training (all ships in workup at Portland); and Captain, Mine Countermeasures. Operational control was delegated to FOSNI, Flag Officer Plymouth, Flag Officer Gibraltar, Flag Officer Malta, Senior Naval Officer West Indies, Commander, ANZUK Naval Forces, and Commodore-in-Charge, Hong Kong.

In 1976, a Task Group was dispatched to the Middle East consisting of two destroyers and six frigates. The following year, four frigates – HMS Mohawk (F125), HMS Zulu, HMS Cleopatra and HMS Amazon – visited Salalah and Muscat in Oman and Basra in Iraq.

The Flag Officer Gibraltar, and Gibraltar Naval Base Commander, a Rear Admiral, double-hatted as NATO's Commander Gibraltar Mediterranean (COMGIBMED). In the late 1980s two small patrol craft, HMS Cormorant and HMS Hart, were reported as being attached to FO Gibraltar.

The post of CINCFLEET also was assigned the NATO appointments of Commander-in-Chief, Eastern Atlantic Area (CINCEASTLANT) and Commander-in-Chief Channel (CINCHAN). On 1 July 1994, the Channel Command was disestablished: however most of its subordinate commands remained in existence although reshuffled: most of the headquarters were absorbed within Allied Command Europe particularly as part of the new Allied Forces Northwestern Europe.

In 1992 Fleet Headquarters moved to Portsmouth. In 2005, the Second Sea Lord, reduced in rank from full Admiral to Vice-Admiral, came under CINCFLEET's command, a situation that lasted until the Levene reforms of 2012.

== Responsibilities ==
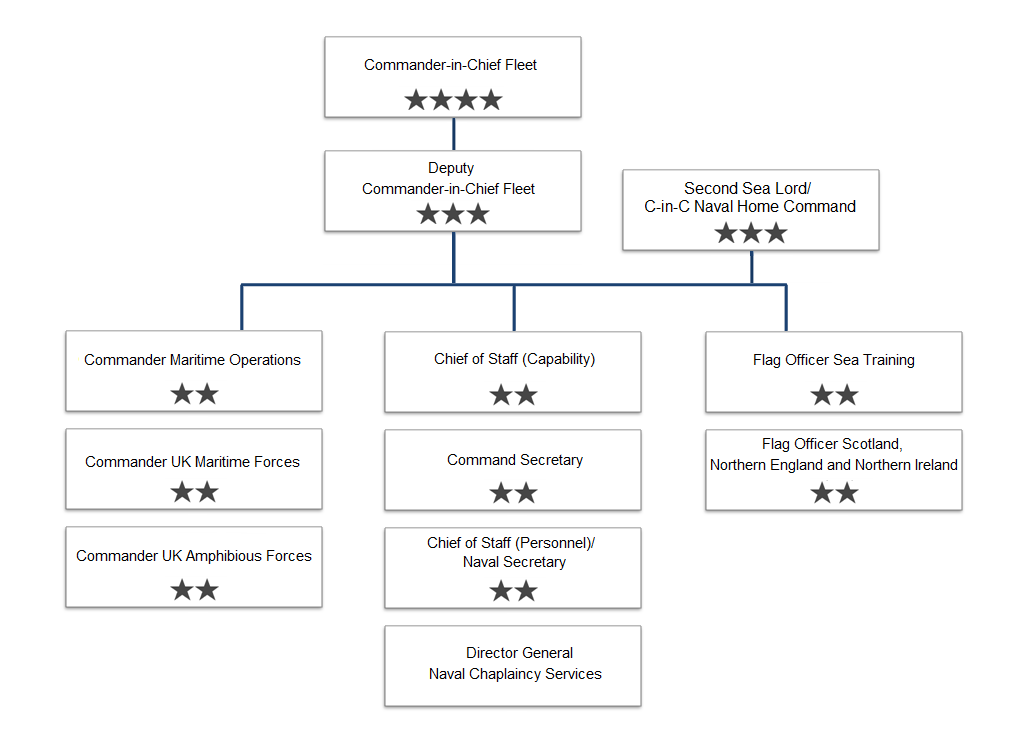
Structure in 2010

Full command of the Fleet and responsibility for the Fleet element of military operational capability including the Royal Marines and the Royal Fleet Auxiliary, was delegated to Commander-in-Chief Fleet, as is described in official descriptions circa 2010. In 1971 after the amalgamation of the Western and Far East Fleets the headquarters was established at Northwood, in the London Borough of Hillingdon (HMS Warrior). Both the CINCFLEET and CINCEASTLANT staffs were co-located there.

In 2002 the Navy Command Headquarters Building at HMS Excellent in Portsmouth was completed. Thereafter the headquarters was split between the Command HQ and CINCFLEET's Operational Headquarters at Northwood, co-located with the Permanent Joint Headquarters.

By the 2010s, CINCFLEET was supported by:

- Second Sea Lord and Commander-in-Chief Naval Home Command, based in HMS Excellent, who was the Principal Personnel Officer for the Royal Navy. The CINCNAVHOME title lapsed in 2012.
- Deputy CINCFLEET, based in HMS Excellent, who directed the work of the Fleet Headquarters
- Commander Operations, based at Northwood, responsible for fleet operations
- Commander United Kingdom Amphibious Forces, who was Commandant General Royal Marines
- Commander United Kingdom Maritime Forces (previously known as Commander UK Task Group), who oversaw the commander of the UK Task Group (COMUKTG), subsequently renamed as the commander Amphibious Task Group (COMATG) and the commander UK Carrier Strike Group (COMUKCSG).

Collectively, COMUKMARFOR, COMUKAMPHIBFOR, Commander UK Task Group (COMUKTG), and the 3 Commando Brigade Headquarters comprised the "Fleet Battle Staff".

== Commanders-in-Chief Fleet ==
The Commanders-in-Chief were:

Most are listed at their final service rank, not at their rank as CINCFLEET, an admiral's position.

Image	Rank	Name	Term began	Term ended
	Admiral of the Fleet	Sir Edward Ashmore	November 1971	December 1973
	Admiral of the Fleet	Sir Terence Lewin	December 1973	October 1975
	Admiral of the Fleet	Sir John Treacher	October 1975	March 1977
	Admiral	Sir Henry Leach	March 1977	May 1979
	Admiral	Sir James Eberle	May 1979	April 1981
	Admiral of the Fleet	Sir John Fieldhouse	April 1981	October 1982
	Admiral	Sir William Staveley	October 1982	June 1985
	Admiral	Sir Nicholas Hunt	June 1985	May 1987
	Admiral	Sir Julian Oswald	May 1987	April 1989
	Admiral	Sir Benjamin Bathurst	April 1989	January 1991
	Admiral	Sir Jock Slater	January 1991	December 1992
	Admiral	Sir Hugo White	December 1992	June 1995
	Admiral	Sir Peter Abbott	October 1995	September 1997
	Admiral	Sir Michael Boyce	September 1997	September 1998
	Admiral	Sir Nigel Essenhigh	September 1998	November 2000
	Admiral	Sir Alan West	November 2000	September 2002
	Admiral	Sir Jonathon Band	September 2002	November 2005
	Admiral	Sir James Burnell-Nugent	November 2005	November 2007
	Admiral	Sir Mark Stanhope	November 2007	June 2009
	Admiral	Sir Trevor Soar	June 2009	January 2012
	Admiral	Sir George Zambellas	January 2012	April 2012

== Deputy Commander-in-Chief, and Chief of Staff ==
Deputy Commanders have included:

- Vice Admiral Sir Roy Newman, Feb 1990–June 1992
- Vice Admiral Sir Geoffrey Biggs, June 1992–June 1994
- Vice Admiral Sir Jonathan Tod, June 1994–June 1997
- Vice Admiral Sir Jeremy Blackham, June 1997–Jan 1999
- Vice Admiral Sir Fabian Malbon, Jan 1999–May 2001
- Vice Admiral Sir Jonathon Band, May 2001–July 2002
- Vice Admiral Sir Mark Stanhope, July 2002–June 2004
- Vice Admiral Sir Timothy McClement, June 2004–Oct 2006
- Vice Admiral Paul Boissier, Oct 2006–July 2009
- Vice Admiral Sir Richard Ibbotson, July 2009–Jan 2011
- Vice Admiral Sir George Zambellas, Jan 2011–Dec 2011
- Vice Admiral Philip Jones Dec 2011–April 2012

=== Chiefs of Staff ===
The Commander-in-Chief, Fleet's principal staff officer was the Chief of Staff, Fleet, responsible for coordinating the supporting staff of Fleet Headquarters from November 1971 to 2012.

#	post holder	dates	notes/ref
1.	Chief of Staff Fleet	1971–2012	In 1990 became a joint title of the Deputy C-in-C
2.	Chief of Staff, (Warfare) Fleet	2002–2006	became CoS Capability
3.	Chief of Staff (Capability) Fleet	2006–2012	
4.	Assistant Chief of Staff, Operations	1971–2010	became ACOS Operations (Navy) in 2002
5.	Assistant Chief of Staff, Plans	1971–2012	
6.	Assistant Chief of Staff, Warfare	1973–2012	
7.	Command Secretary, Fleet	1971–2012	

== Subordinate commands ==
At various times included:

#	post holder	see	dates
1.	Chaplain of the Fleet and Director-General Naval Chaplaincy Services	Main article: Chaplain of the Fleet	1971-2012
2.	Commandant General Royal Marines		1971-2012
3.	Commander Operations	Main article: Commander Operations (Royal Navy)	1993-2012
4.	Commander UK Amphibious Forces		2001-2012
5.	Commander United Kingdom Maritime Forces		2001-2012
6.	Flag Officer, Carriers and Amphibious Ships		1971-1979
7.	Flag Officer First Flotilla		1971-1990
8.	Flag Officer Naval Air Command	Main article: Flag Officer Naval Air Command	1971-2010
9.	Flag Officer Gibraltar and Gibraltar Naval Base Commander	Main article: Flag Officer Gibraltar	1971-1992
10.	Flag Officer Scotland, Northern England, Northern Ireland	Main article: Flag Officer Scotland, Northern England, Northern Ireland	1996-2012
11.	Flag Officer Scotland and Northern Ireland	Main article: Flag Officer Scotland and Northern Ireland	1971-1996
12.	Flag Officer Sea Training	Main article: Flag Officer Sea Training	1971-2012
13.	Flag Officer, Second Flotilla	Main article: Flag Officer, Second Flotilla	1971-1992
14.	Flag Officer Submarines	Main article: Commodore Submarine Service	1971-1991
15.	Flag Officer, Surface Flotilla	Main article: Flag Officer, Surface Flotilla	1990-2002
16.	Flag Officer, Third Flotilla	Main article: Flag Officer, Third Flotilla	1979-1992

== Structure charts ==
=== Flag Officer First Flotilla, 1989 ===
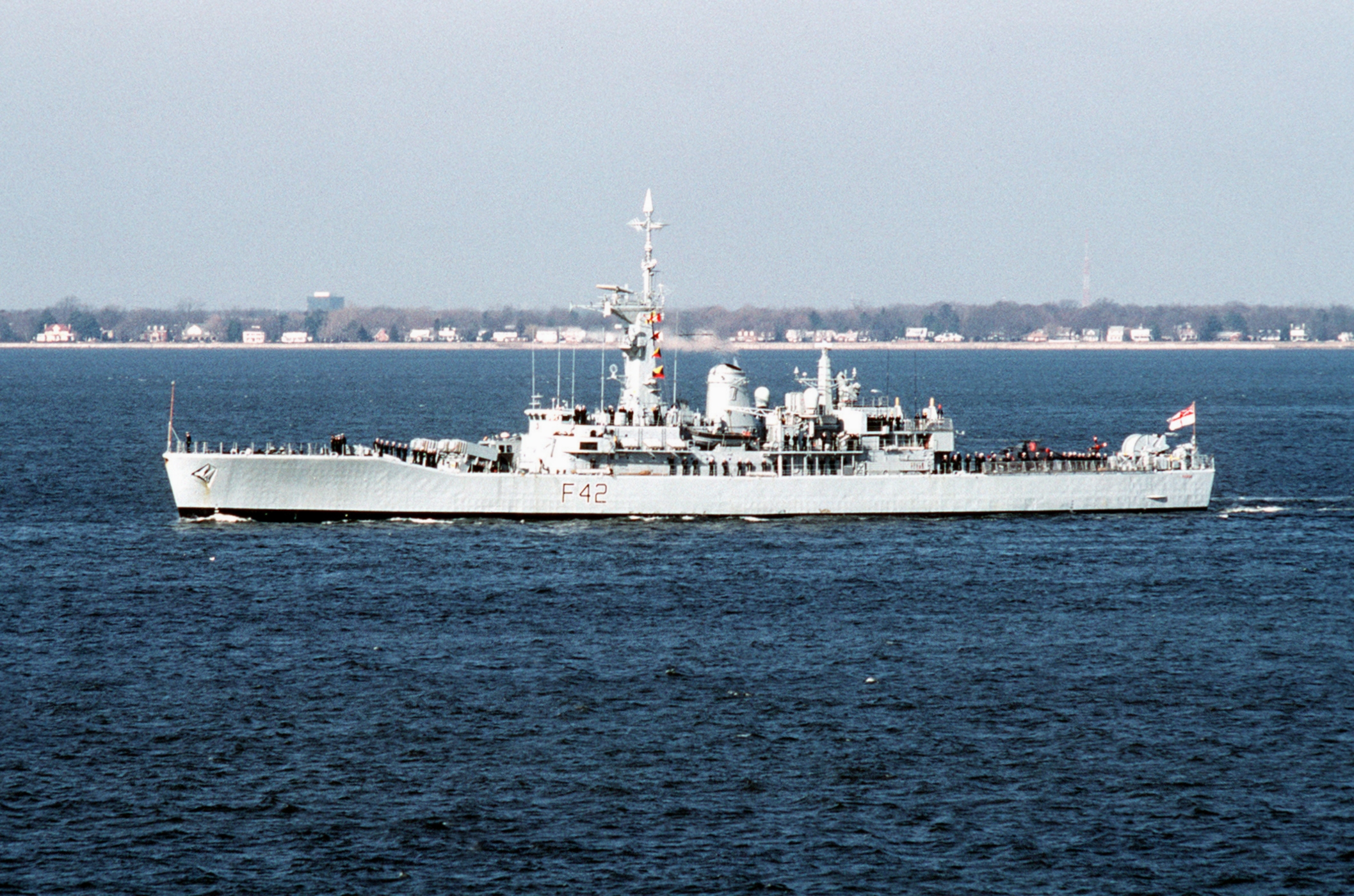
The Leander-class frigate HMS Phoebe in the Hampton Roads

The Flag Officer First Flotilla (FOF1) was a rear admiral based at HMNB Portsmouth who commanded the navy's First Flotilla.

- First Flotilla, HMNB Portsmouth
  - 1st Frigate Squadron, HMNB Devonport with
    - Type 22 frigates (Batch 2): HMS Boxer, HMS Beaver, HMS Brave, HMS London, HMS Sheffield, HMS Coventry
  - 2nd Frigate Squadron, HMNB Devonport with
    - Type 22 frigates (Batch 1): HMS Broadsword, HMS Battleaxe, HMS Brilliant, HMS Brazen
  - 5th Destroyer Squadron, HMNB Portsmouth with
    - Type 42 destroyers: HMS Newcastle, HMS Exeter, HMS Southampton, HMS Manchester, HMS Gloucester, HMS Cardiff
  - 6th Frigate Squadron, HMNB Devonport with
    - Leander-class frigates (Batch 3A): HMS Andromeda, HMS Hermione, HMS Jupiter, HMS Scylla, HMS Charybdis
    - Dartmouth Training Squadron (JFS 1989, p. 651)
      - Type 82 destroyer: HMS Bristol, Leander-class frigates (Batch 3B): HMS Ariadne, HMS Achilles

=== Flag Officer, Second Flotilla, 1989 ===
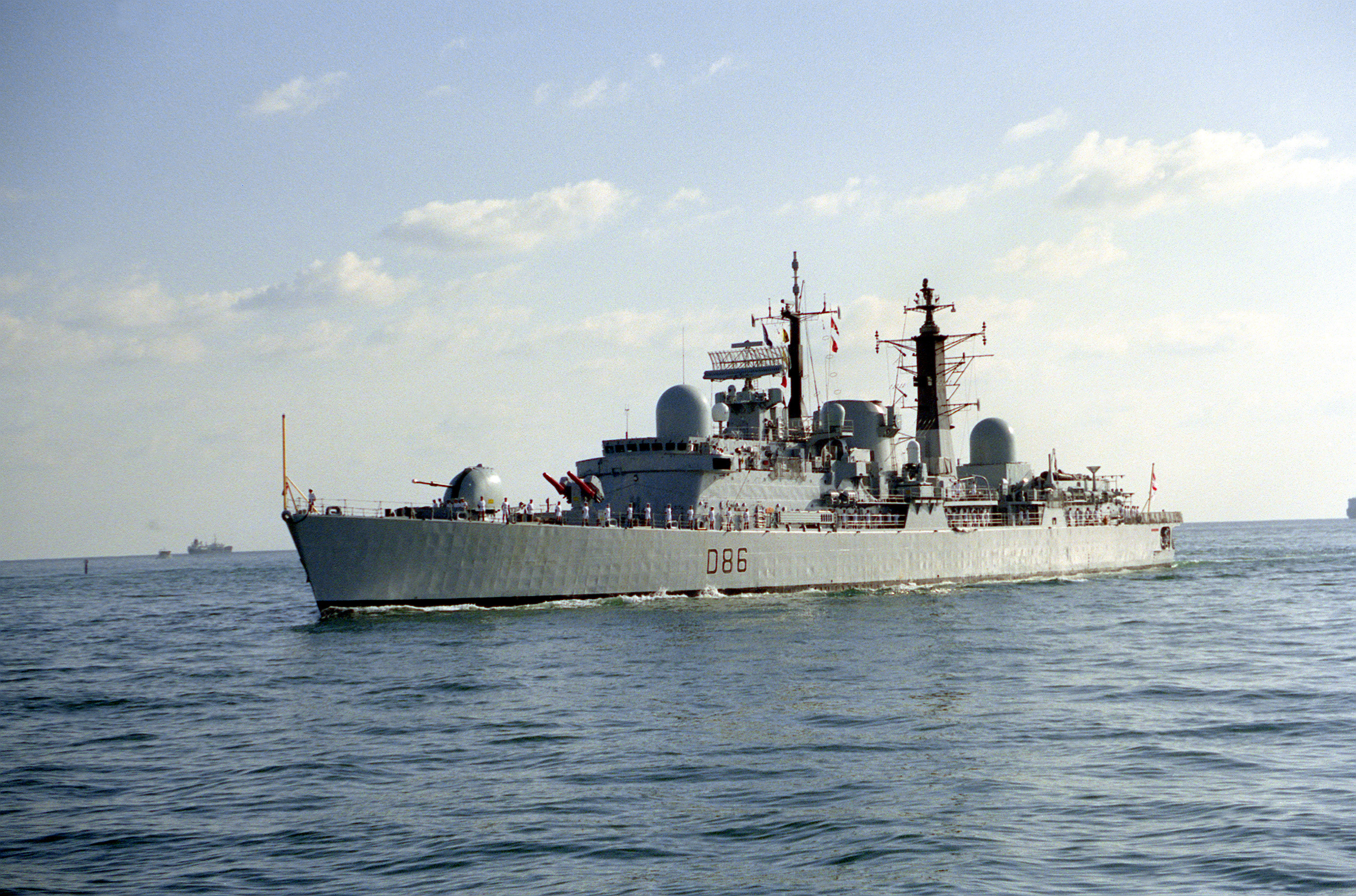
The Type 42 destroyer HMS Birmingham entering Port Everglades in Florida

The Flag Officer, Second Flotilla was a rear admiral based HMNB Devonport who commanded the navy's Second Flotilla.

- Second Flotilla, with ships based HMNB Devonport:
  - 3rd Destroyer Squadron, RN Dockyard Rosyth with
    - Type 42 destroyers: HMS Birmingham, HMS Glasgow, HMS Nottingham, HMS Liverpool, HMS Edinburgh, HMS York
  - 4th Frigate Squadron, HMNB Devonport with
    - Type 21 frigates: HMS Amazon, HMS Active, HMS Ambuscade, HMS Arrow, HMS Alacrity, HMS Avenger
  - 7th Frigate Squadron, HMNB Devonport with
    - Leander-class frigates (Batch 2): HMS Cleopatra, HMS Arethusa (Batch 1, decommissioned April 1989), HMS Sirius, HMS Phoebe, HMS Danae, HMS Argonaut, HMS Penelope
  - 8th Frigate Squadron, HMNB Devonport with
    - Type 22 frigates (Batch 3): HMS Cumberland, HMS Campbeltown, HMS Chatham (commissioned 4 May 1990), HMS Cornwall

=== Flag Officer, Third Flotilla, 1989 ===
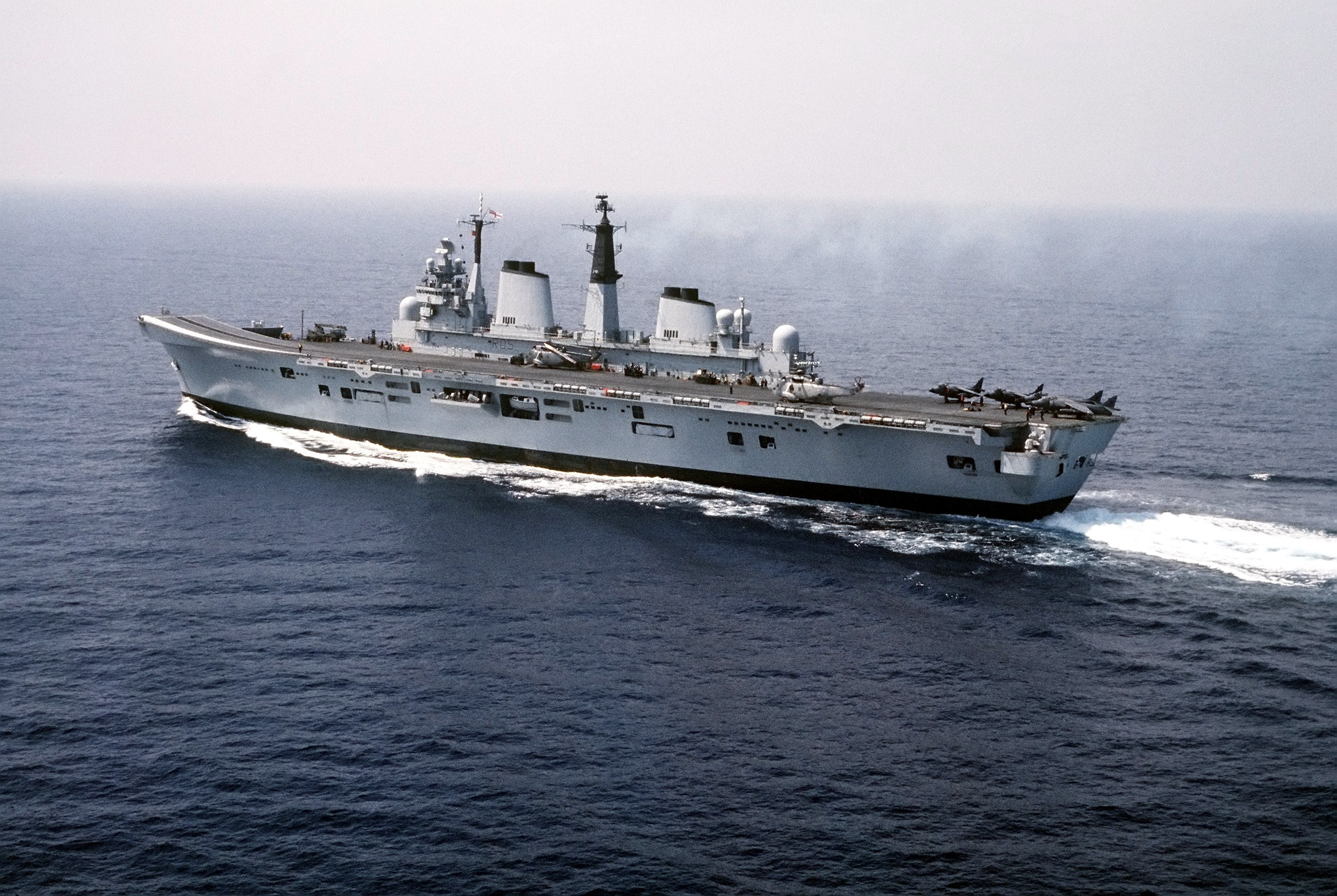
HMS Invincible during NATO exercise Dragon Hammer 90

The Flag Officer, Third Flotilla was a rear admiral based at HMNB Portsmouth who doubled as NATO Commander Anti-Submarine Warfare Striking Force. In 1989 Vice Admiral Alan Grose held this appointment.

- Third Flotilla, HMNB Portsmouth
  - HMS Invincible, HMS Illustrious (refit at HMNB Devonport), HMS Ark Royal, HMS Intrepid, RFA Argus, RFA Engadine (decommissioned March 1989), HMS Challenger (K07), HMS Endurance (ice patrol vessel)

=== Flag Officer Scotland and Northern Ireland, 1989 ===
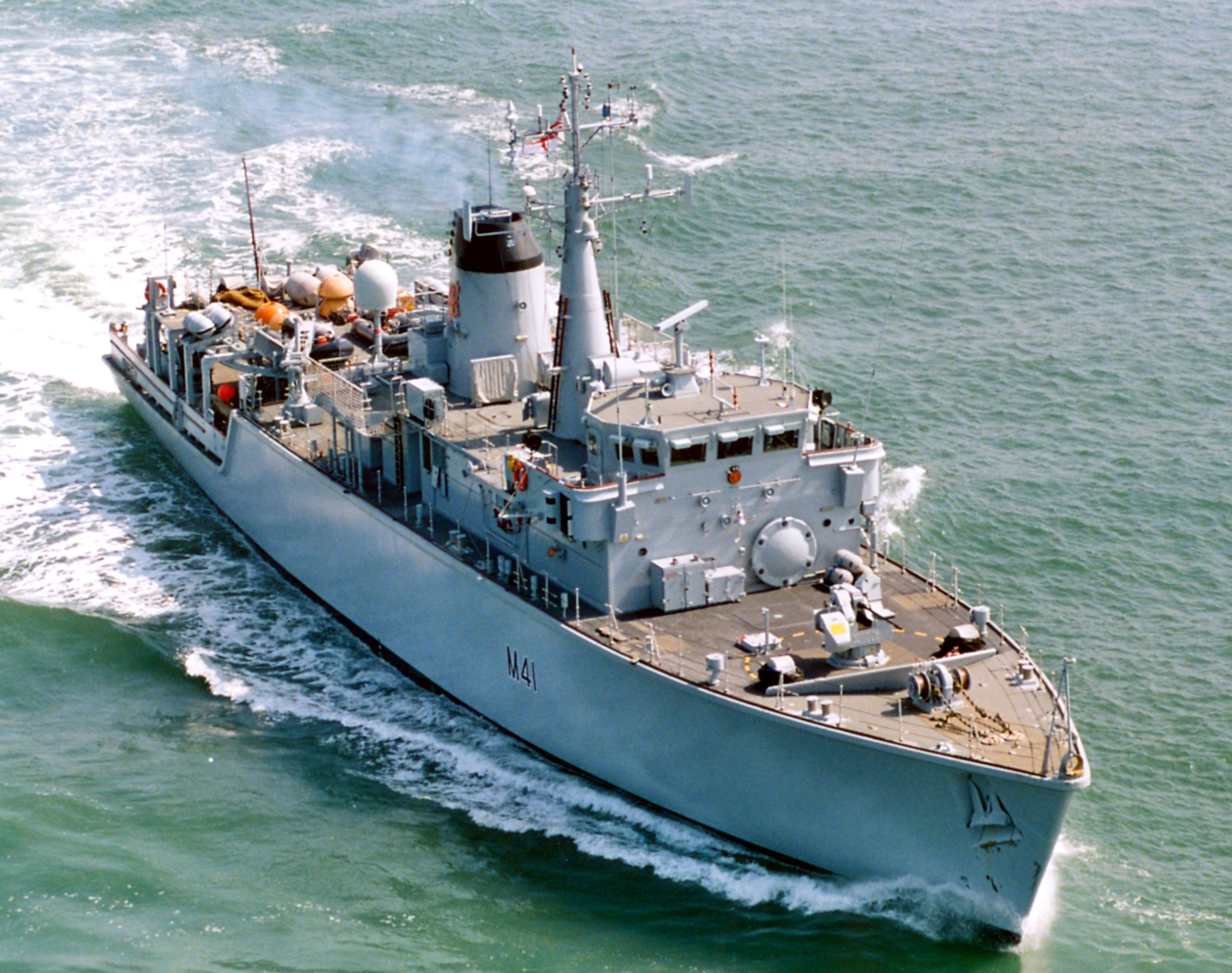
The Hunt-class mine countermeasures vessel HMS Quorn leaving port

The Flag Officer Scotland and Northern Ireland (FOSNI) was a vice admiral based at RAF Pitreavie Castle, who commanded the navy's units in Scotland and Northern Ireland and double-hatted as Naval Base Commander at Rosyth, NATO Commander Northern Sub-Area (NORLANT) and Commander Nore Sub-Area Channel (NORECHAN). The main unit under his command was the Mine Countermeasures Flotilla based at Royal Naval Dockyard Rosyth on the Firth of Forth, which was commanded by a commodore. Additionally the Second Flotilla's 3rd Destroyer Squadron was based at RN Dockyard Rosyth. In war FOSNI would have been one of two naval operational commands, with the other being Flag Officer Plymouth.

- Flag Officer Scotland and Northern Ireland, RAF Pitreavie Castle, Rosyth
  - Mine Countermeasures Flotilla, Royal Naval Dockyard Rosyth
    - 1st Mine Countermeasures Squadron, RN Dockyard Rosyth with
      - Hunt-class mine countermeasures vessels: HMS Brecon, HMS Middleton, HMS Berkeley, HMS Quorn
    - 2nd Mine Countermeasures Squadron, RN Dockyard Rosyth with
      - Hunt-class mine countermeasures vessels: HMS Cattistock, HMS Cottesmore, HMS Chiddingfold, HMS Atherstone, HMS Hurworth
    - 3rd Mine Countermeasures Squadron, HMNB Portsmouth with
      - Ton-class minesweepers: HMS Hubberston, HMS Iveston, HMS Sheraton, HMS Brinton, HMS Brereton, HMS Maxton (decommissioned August 1989)
      - Sandown-class minehunter: HMS Sandown (commissioned 9 June 1989)
    - 4th Mine Countermeasures Squadron, RN Dockyard Rosyth with
      - Hunt-class mine countermeasures vessels: HMS Ledbury, HMS Brocklesby, HMS Dulverton, HMS Bicester
    - 10th Mine Countermeasures Squadron, manned by the Royal Naval Reserve and each of the squadron's ships assigned to a reserve divisions:
      - River-class minesweepers: HMS Waveney, HMS Carron, HMS Dovey, HMS Helford, HMS Humber, HMS Blackwater, HMS Itchen, HMS Helmsdale, HMS Orwell, HMS Ribble, HMS Spey, HMS Arun
    - Fishery Protection Squadron, RN Dockyard Rosyth with:
      - Ton-class minesweepers: HMS Kellington, HMS Soberton, HMS Upton
      - Castle-class patrol vessel: HMS Dumbarton Castle
      - Island-class patrol vessels: HMS Anglesey, HMS Alderney, HMS Jersey, HMS Guernsey, HMS Shetland, HMS Orkney, HMS Lindisfarne
    - Northern Ireland Patrol Squadron, Belfast Harbour with
      - Ton-class minesweepers: HMS Cuxton, HMS Kedleston, HMS Nurton, HMS Wilton (built with glass-reinforced plastic)
      - Bird-class patrol vessels: HMS Cygnet, HMS Kingfisher, HMS Redpole

=== Flag Officer Plymouth, 1989 ===
The Flag Officer Plymouth was a vice admiral based at Admiralty House, who commanded the navy's units in England and Wales and double-hatted as Naval Base Commander Devonport, NATO Commander Central Sub-Area (CENTLANT) and Commander Plymouth Sub-Area Channel (PLYMCHAN). In war Flag Officer Plymouth would have been one of two naval operational commands, with the other being Flag Officer Scotland and Northern Ireland.

=== Flag Officer Submarines, 1989 ===
The Flag Officer Submarines was a rear admiral based at Northwood Headquarters, who commanded the Royal Navy Submarine Service and double-hatted as NATO Commander Submarine Force Eastern Atlantic (COMSUBEASTLANT).

- Flag Officer Submarines (FOSM), Northwood Headquarters, Eastbury
    - 1st Submarine Squadron, HMS Dolphin with
      - Oberon-class submarines: HMS Orpheus (only harbour service), HMS Olympus (sold to Canada in 1989), HMS Osiris (sold to Canada in 1989), HMS Onslaught, HMS Otter, HMS Otus, HMS Opossum, HMS Opportune, HMS Onyx
    - 2nd Submarine Squadron, HMNB Devonport with
      - Swiftsure-class submarines: HMS Swiftsure, HMS Splendid (refit at HMNB Devonport), HMS Superb
      - Trafalgar-class submarines: HMS Trafalgar, HMS Turbulent, HMS Tireless, HMS Torbay, HMS Trenchant, HMS Talent (commissioned 12 May 1990)
    - 3rd Submarine Squadron, HMNB Clyde with
      - Oberon-class submarines: HMS Odin, HMS Oracle, HMS Ocelot
      - Churchill-class submarines: HMS Churchill (refit at RN Dockyard Rosyth), HMS Conqueror, HMS Courageous
      - Valiant-class submarines: HMS Valiant, HMS Warspite (refit at HMNB Devonport)
      - Swiftsure-class submarines: HMS Sceptre, HMS Spartan, HMS Sovereign
    - 10th Submarine Squadron, HMNB Clyde with
      - Resolution-class ballistic missile submarines: HMS Resolution, HMS Repulse, HMS Renown (refit at RN Dockyard Rosyth), HMS Revenge

=== Flag Officer Naval Air Command, 1989 ===
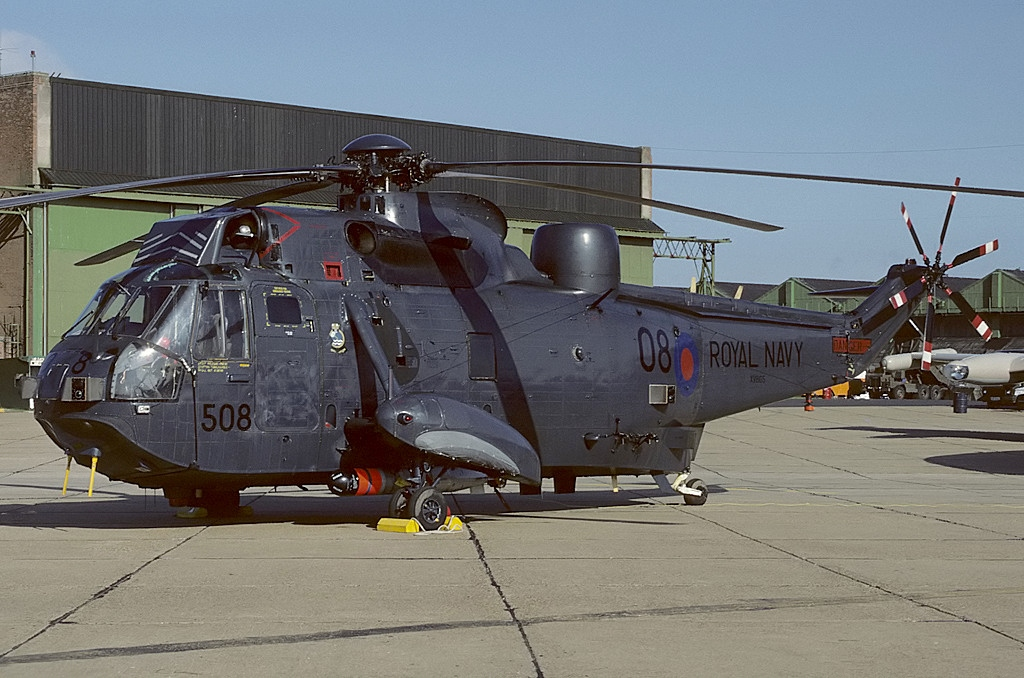
A Sea King HAS.6 from 814 Naval Air Squadron armed with torpedoes at RNAS Culdrose

The Flag Officer Naval Air Command was a rear admiral based at RNAS Yeovilton, who commanded the Fleet Air Arm.

- Flag Officer Naval Air Command (FONAC), RNAS Yeovilton
  - RNAS Prestwick:
    - 819 Naval Air Squadron (Anti-submarine, Sea King HAS.5)
    - 824 Naval Air Squadron (Anti-submarine, Sea King HAS.6) (disbanded August 1989)
  - RNAS Yeovilton:
    - 707 Naval Air Squadron (Air assault, Sea King HC.4)
    - 800 Naval Air Squadron (Sea Harrier FRS.1, being upgraded to F(A).2)
    - 801 Naval Air Squadron (Sea Harrier FRS.1, being upgraded to F(A).2)
    - 845 Naval Air Squadron (Air assault, Sea King HC.4)
    - 846 Naval Air Squadron (Air assault, Sea King HC.4)
    - 899 Naval Air Squadron (Training, Sea Harrier FRS.1, Sea Harrier T.4A/T.4N, Hunter T.8M)
    - Fleet Requirements and Aircraft Direction Unit (Canberra TT.18, Hunter GA.11/T.8, Dassault Falcon 20)
  - RNAS Culdrose:
    - 705 Naval Air Squadron (Basic helicopter training, Gazelle HT.2/HT.3)
    - 706 Naval Air Squadron (Sea King training, various Sea King)
      - Sea King Training Unit (RAF unit attached to 706 Naval Air Squadron, 2x Sea King HAR.3)
    - 750 Naval Air Squadron (Observer training, Jetstream T.2)
    - 771 Naval Air Squadron (Search & Rescue, Sea King HAR.5)
    - 814 Naval Air Squadron (Anti-submarine, Sea King HAS.5)
    - 820 Naval Air Squadron (Anti-submarine, Sea King HAS.6)
    - 826 Naval Air Squadron (Anti-submarine, Sea King HAS.6)
    - 849 Naval Air Squadron (Airborne early warning and control, 10x Sea King AEW.2A)
  - RNAS Portland:
    - 702 Naval Air Squadron (Training, Lynx HAS.3S)
    - 772 Naval Air Squadron (Air assault, Sea King HC.4)
    - 810 Naval Air Squadron (Anti-submarine, Sea King HAS.5, began conversion to HAS.6 in October 1989)
    - 815 Naval Air Squadron (Frigate & destroyer helicopters, Lynx HAS.3S, most deployed on frigates and destroyers at sea)
    - 829 Naval Air Squadron (Frigate & destroyer helicopters, Lynx HAS.3S, most deployed on frigates and destroyers at sea)
    - Lynx HMA.8 trials unit (formed in September 1989)
  - Roborough:
    - Flying Grading Flight (Chipmunk T.10)

=== Commandant General Royal Marines, 1989 ===
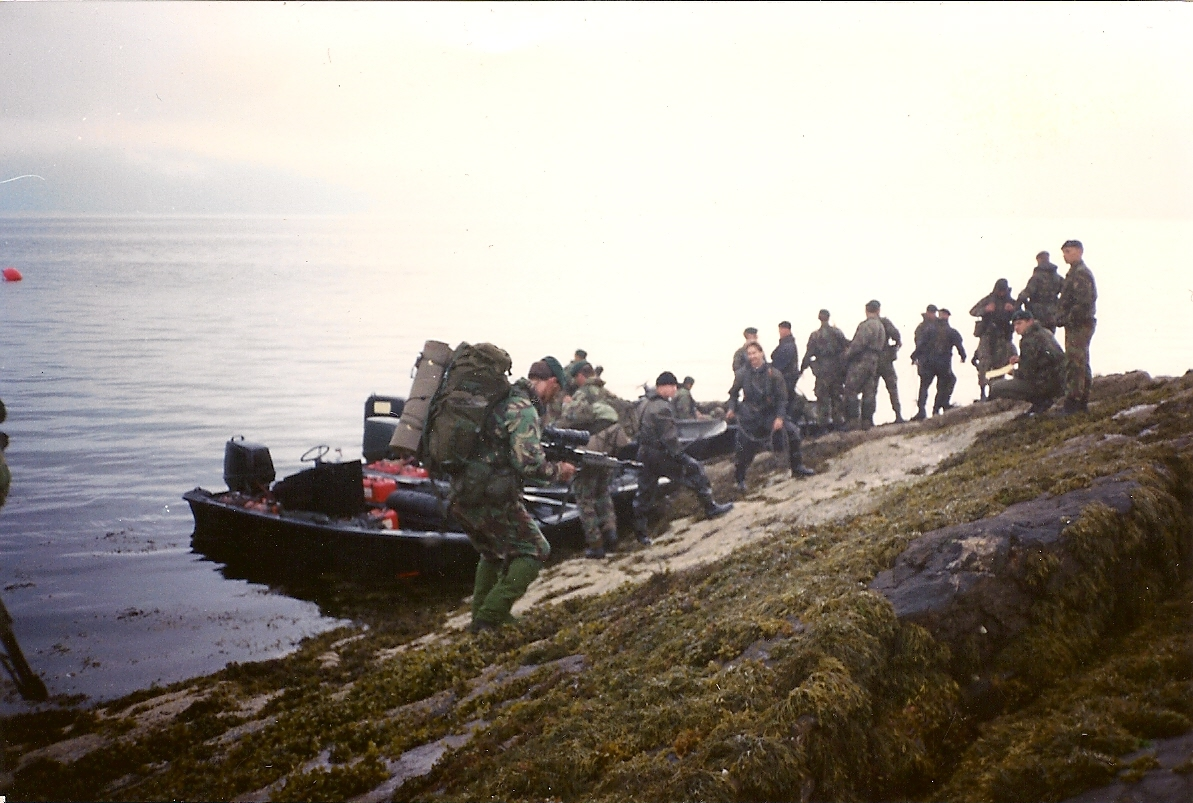
Royal Marines during an exercise in Scotland

The Commandant General Royal Marines, in 1989 Lieutenant General Sir Martin Garrod based at Whitehall, was the service head of the Royal Marines. In 1991 their structure was described as "very top heavy. They have nearly 8,000 men to put 2,400 in the field...they have three 'tied' generals, the Commandant General, a major general as his chief of staff, and a major general commando forces."

- Commandant General Royal Marines, London
  - Major-General, Commando Forces
  - 3 Commando Brigade, Plymouth
    - 40 Commando, Taunton
    - 42 Commando, Bickleigh
    - 45 Commando, Arbroath
    - 4 Assault Squadron, Plymouth (4x LCU Mk.9, 4x LCVP Mk.4, 2x Centurion BARV), served aboard HMS Fearless (L10)
    - 539 Assault Squadron, Plymouth (4x LCU Mk.9, 4x LCVP Mk.4, 2x Centurion BARV), served aboard HMS Intrepid (L11)
    - 3 Commando Brigade Air Squadron, RNAS Yeovilton (12x Gazelle AH.1, 6x Lynx AH.1)
    - 2 Raiding Squadron, Royal Marines (Reserve), Plymouth
  - Comacchio Group, HMNB Clyde, guarded HMNB Clyde and the UK's naval nuclear weapons stored at RNAD Coulport
  - Royal Marines Police, Plymouth
  - Commando Training Centre Royal Marines, Lympstone
  - Royal Marines Reserve (RMR), Plymouth
    - RMR Bristol, Bristol
    - RMR London, Wandsworth
    - RMR Merseyside, Liverpool
    - RMR Scotland, Edinburgh
    - RMR Tyne, Newcastle
