= Flag Officer, Second Flotilla =

Second Flotilla
- Ensign of the Royal Navy
- Active: 1971 – 1992
- Country: United Kingdom
- Branch: Royal Navy
- Size: Flotilla
- Part of: Commander-in-Chief Fleet
- Garrison/HQ: HMNB Devonport

Commanders
- First: Rear-Admiral David Williams
- Last: Rear-Admiral John R. Brigstocke

The Flag Officer, Second Flotilla was a senior British Royal Navy appointment from 1971 to 1992.

== History ==
After the creation of the single Commander-in-Chief Fleet post in 1971, its subordinate commands were reorganised. Three major sub-commands were created; the First Flotilla, Second Flotilla and Carriers and Amphibious Ships each commanded by a rear admiral. The Flotilla included (Watson & Smith 2015):

- 4th Frigate Squadron (1976-1981)
- 5th Frigate Squadron (1972-1976)
- 6th Frigate Squadron (1972-1976)
- 7th Frigate Squadron (1972-1980)
- 8th Frigate Squadron (1972-1980)
- 5th Destroyer Squadron (1980-1992)

In 1990 the First Flotilla was re-designated Surface Flotilla. Rear Admiral Brigstocke, the incumbent Flag Officer Second Flotilla, commanded the HMS Ark Royal (R07) task group off Libya during the Gulf War.

In April 1992, the system was changed when the Third Flotilla was abolished and the remaining two flotilla commanders became Flag Officer, Surface Flotilla - responsible for operational readiness and training; and Second Flotilla became Flag Officer, UK Task Group, who would command any deployed task group.

== Flag Officers, Second Flotilla ==
Included:

- Rear-Admiral David Williams: November 1971-March 1972
- Rear-Admiral Andrew J. Miller: March 1972-March 1973
- Rear-Admiral Richard P. Clayton: March 1973-December 1974
- Rear-Admiral John D.E. Fieldhouse: December 1974-October 1976
- Rear-Admiral William D.M. Staveley: October 1976-March 1977
- Rear-Admiral Martin La T. Wemyss: March 1977-December 1978
- Rear-Admiral Peter M. Stanford: December 1978-October 1980
- Rear-Admiral Nicholas J.S. Hunt: October 1980-November 1981
- Rear-Admiral Robert W. F. Gerken: November 1981-October 1983
- Rear-Admiral D. Benjamin Bathurst: October 1983-April 1985
- Rear-Admiral W. Richard S. Thomas: April 1985-December 1986
- Rear-Admiral Guy F. Liardet: December 1986-March 1988
- Rear-Admiral A. Peter Woodhead: March 1988-August 1989
- Rear-Admiral Peter C. Abbott: August 1989-January 1991
- Rear-Admiral John R. Brigstocke: January 1991-April 1992
