= Michael Boyce, Baron Boyce =

Royal Navy Admiral of the Fleet and life peer (1943–2022)

Admiral of the Fleet The Right Honourable The Lord Boyce KG GCB OBE KStJ DL
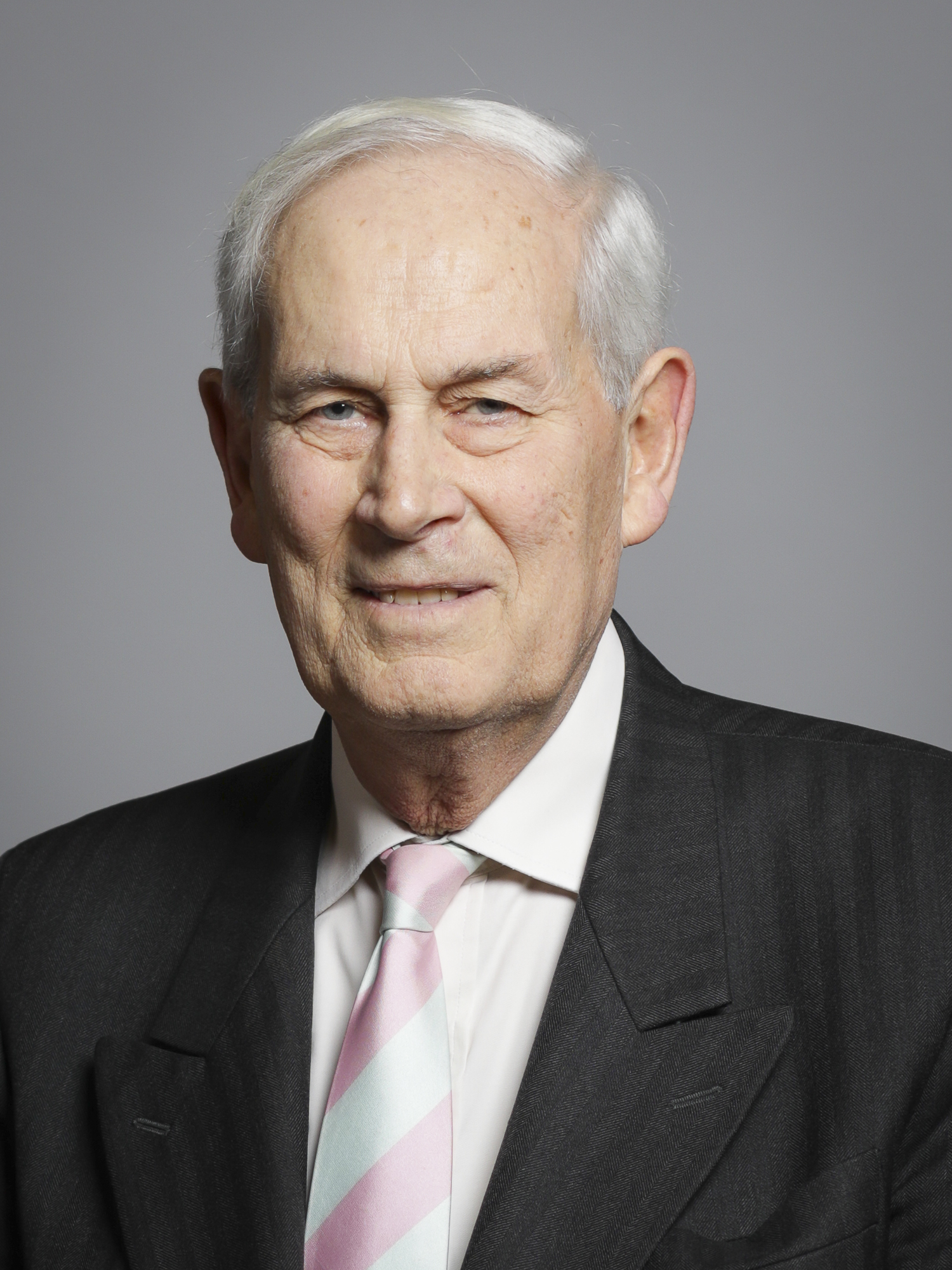
- Official portrait, 2019
- Born: 2 April 1943; Cape Town, Cape Province, South Africa
- Died: 6 November 2022 (aged 79); Ipswich, Suffolk, England
- Military career
- Allegiance: United Kingdom
- Branch: Royal Navy
- Service years: 1961–2003
- Rank: Admiral of the Fleet
- Commands: Chief of the Defence Staff (2001–2003); First Sea Lord (1998–2001); Commander-in-Chief Fleet (1997–1998); Naval Home Command (1995–1997); Flag Officer, Surface Flotilla (1992–1994); Flag Officer Sea Training (1991–1992); Director of Naval Staff Duties (1989–1991); Senior Naval Officer, Middle East (1989); HMS Brilliant (1983–1984); HMS Superb (1979–1981); HMS Opossum (1974–1976); HMS Oberon (1973–1974)
- Conflicts: Iraq War
- Awards: Knight Companion of the Order of the Garter; Knight Grand Cross of the Order of the Bath; Officer of the Order of the British Empire; Knight of Justice of the Order of Saint John; Commander of the Legion of Merit (United States)
- Other work: Deputy Lieutenant of Greater London (2003–2022); Lord Warden and Admiral of the Cinque Ports (2005–2022); Vice-Admiral of the United Kingdom (2021–2022); Regimental Colonel Commandant of the Special Boat Service

Member of the House of Lords
- Lord Temporal
- Life peerage 16 June 2003 – 6 December 2022

Personal details
- Party: Crossbencher

Admiral of the Fleet Michael Cecil Boyce, Baron Boyce (2 April 1943 – 6 November 2022) was a British Royal Navy officer who also sat as a crossbench member of the House of Lords until his death in November 2022.

Boyce commanded three submarines and then a frigate before achieving higher command in the Navy and serving as First Sea Lord and Chief of the Naval Staff from 1998 to 2001 and then as Chief of the Defence Staff from 2001 to 2003. As Chief of Defence Staff he is believed to have had concerns about US plans for a national missile defence system. In early 2003 he advised the British Government on the deployment of troops for the invasion of Iraq, seeking assurances as to the legitimacy of the deployment before it was allowed to proceed.

== Early life ==
Michael Cecil Boyce, the first son of Commander Hugh Boyce DSC and his Afrikaner wife, Madeline (née Manley), was born in Cape Town on 2 April 1943. His two brothers were Philip Boyce, a professor of psychiatry in Australia, and Graham Boyce, a diplomat.

== Naval career ==
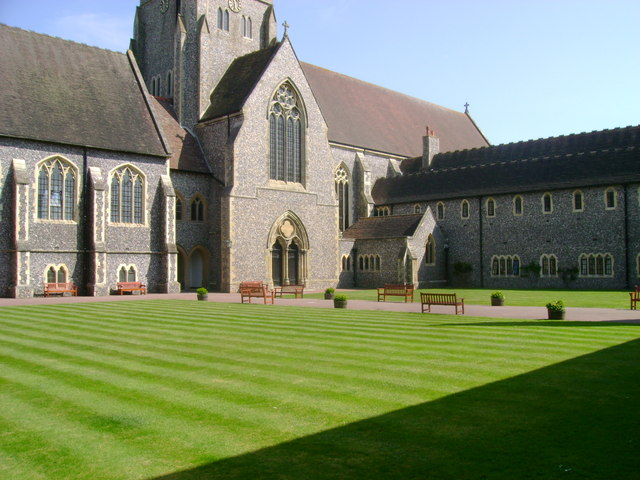
Hurstpierpoint College in West Sussex, where Boyce was educated

Boyce was educated at Hurstpierpoint College and the Royal Naval College, Dartmouth. He joined the Royal Navy as a cadet in 1961 and, having trained as a submariner, was confirmed in the rank of sub-lieutenant on 10 December 1965, promoted to lieutenant on 30 August 1966, and saw service in the submarines HMS Anchorite, HMS Valiant and HMS Conqueror. He completed the Submarine Command Course in 1973, became commanding officer of the submarine HMS Oberon in the same year and, having been promoted to lieutenant commander on 8 January 1974, was given command of the submarine HMS Opossum later that year.

Promoted to the rank of commander on 30 June 1976, Boyce became commanding officer of the submarine HMS Superb in 1979. He was posted to the Directorate of Naval Plans at the Ministry of Defence in 1981 and appointed an Officer of the Order of the British Empire (OBE) in the 1982 Birthday Honours, before being promoted to captain on 30 June 1982. He was given command of the frigate HMS Brilliant in January 1983, and returned to the Ministry of Defence as captain, Submarine Sea Training in 1984. He attended the Royal College of Defence Studies in 1988 and then became Senior Naval Officer in the Middle East in 1989. He went on to be Director of Naval Staff Duties at the Ministry of Defence in August 1989. Following promotion to rear admiral, he became Flag Officer Sea Training in July 1991. He became Flag Officer, Surface Flotilla and NATO Commander of the Anti-Submarine Warfare Striking Force in November 1992.

Promoted to vice admiral in February 1994, Boyce was appointed a Knight Commander of the Order of the Bath in the 1995 New Year Honours. He was promoted to full admiral on 25 May 1995, on appointment as Second Sea Lord and Commander-in-Chief Naval Home Command, and went on to be Commander-in-Chief Fleet as well as NATO Commander-in-Chief Eastern Atlantic and NATO Commander Allied Naval Forces North West Europe in September 1997.

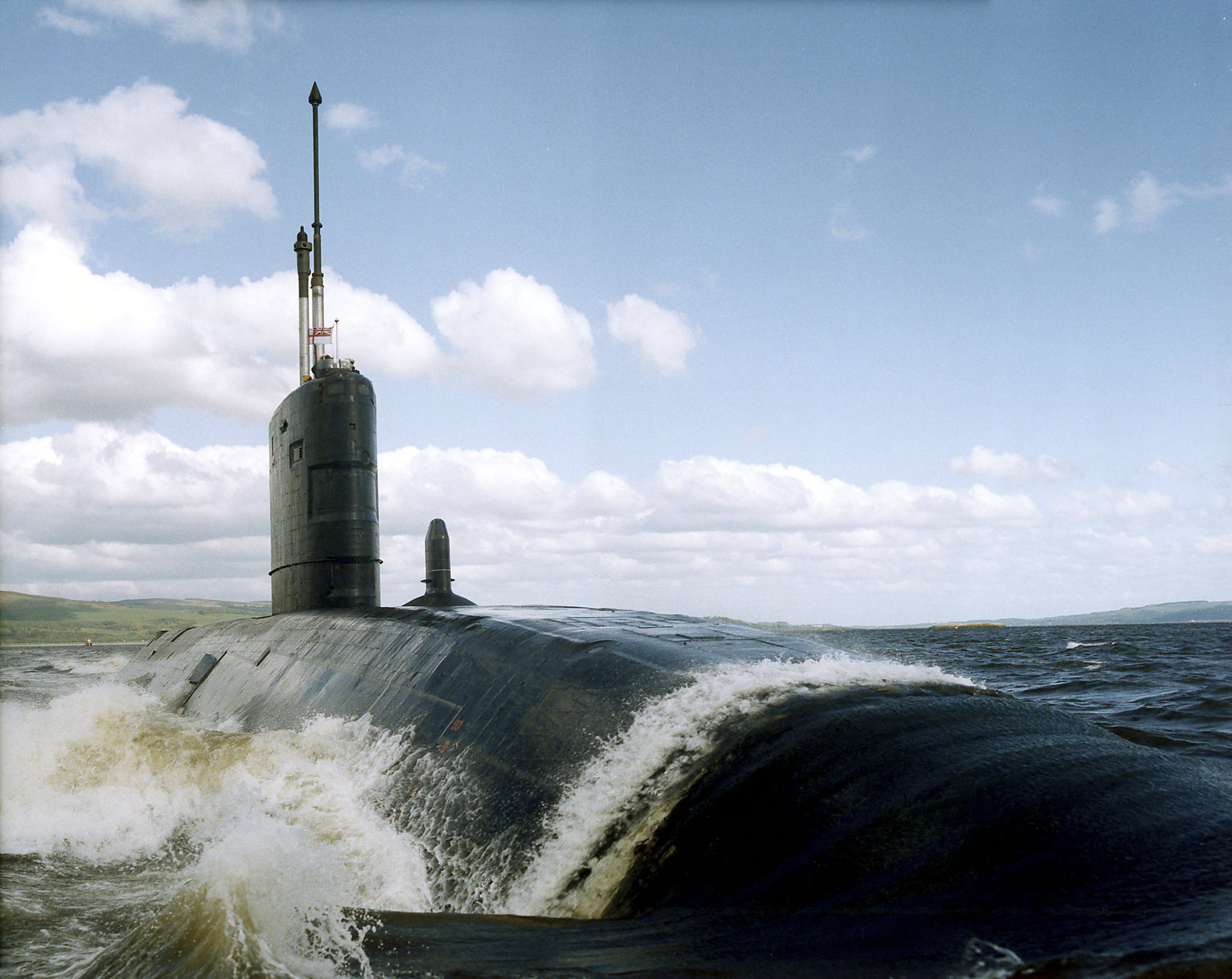
The submarine HMS Superb which Boyce commanded in the late 1970s

Boyce became First Sea Lord and Chief of Naval Staff in October 1998 and was advanced to Knight Grand Cross of the Order of the Bath in the 1999 Birthday Honours. He was appointed Chief of the Defence Staff in February 2001, and in that role is believed to have had concerns about US plans for a national missile defence system. In early 2003 he advised the British Government on the deployment of troops for the invasion of Iraq, seeking assurances as to the legitimacy of the deployment before it was allowed to proceed. He was appointed a Knight of Justice of the Most Venerable Order of the Hospital of Saint John of Jerusalem on 27 November 2002, and retired as Chief of Defence Staff on 7 November 2003.

== Later career ==
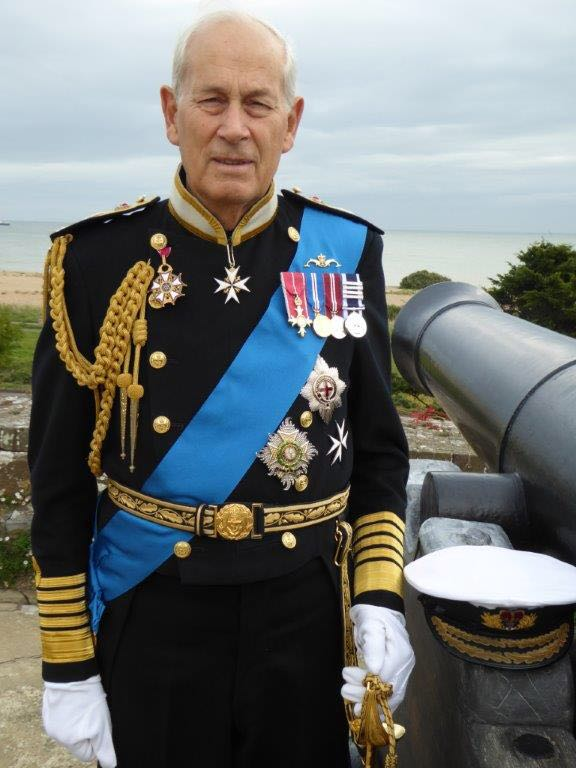
Lord Boyce in 2015

Boyce was created a life peer as Baron Boyce, of Pimlico in the City of Westminster, on 16 June 2003 and was appointed a Deputy Lieutenant of Greater London on 19 December 2003. He was also appointed a non-executive director of WS Atkins plc in May 2004 and Lord Warden of the Cinque Ports on 10 December 2004, succeeding Queen Elizabeth the Queen Mother in that role. He became chairman of the Royal Navy Club of 1765 & 1785 (United 1889) in 2004.

In May 2005, Boyce was among the several retired Chiefs of Defence Staff who spoke in the House of Lords about the risk to servicemen facing liability for their actions – for which he claims politicians are ultimately responsible – before the International Criminal Court. He gave evidence to The Iraq Inquiry on 3 December 2009. He was created a Knight Companion of the Order of the Garter in April 2011 and was a member of the Top Level Group of UK Parliamentarians for Multilateral Nuclear Disarmament and Non-proliferation.

Boyce was Patron of the Submariners Association, Dover College, the Dover War Memorial Project and of Kent Search and Rescue as well as being an Elder Brother of Trinity House and Chairman of the Royal National Lifeboat Institution. He took a keen interest in sports. In 2013, he was elected Master of the Drapers' Company. He has been the president of the Pilgrims Society, the Royal Navy Submarine Museum and Hastings charity, the Winkle Club, as well as a trustee of the Naval and Military Club.

Boyce was appointed an honorary admiral of the fleet in the Queen's 2014 Birthday Honours.

On 6 December 2021, Boyce was appointed Vice-Admiral of the United Kingdom.

== Personal life and death ==
In 1971, Boyce married Harriette Gail Fletcher, with whom he had one son and one daughter. Following the dissolution of his first marriage, he married Fleur Margaret Anne Rutherford (née Smith). Lady Boyce died in 2016 at the age of 67.

Boyce died from prostate cancer in Ipswich, on 6 November 2022, at the age of 79.

A service of thanksgiving was held at Westminster Abbey on 13 July 2023. Sir Graham Boyce, brother, Admiral Sir George Zambellas and Colonel Oliver Lee paid tribute.

== Honours ==
Boyce's banner as Lord Warden of the Cinque Ports

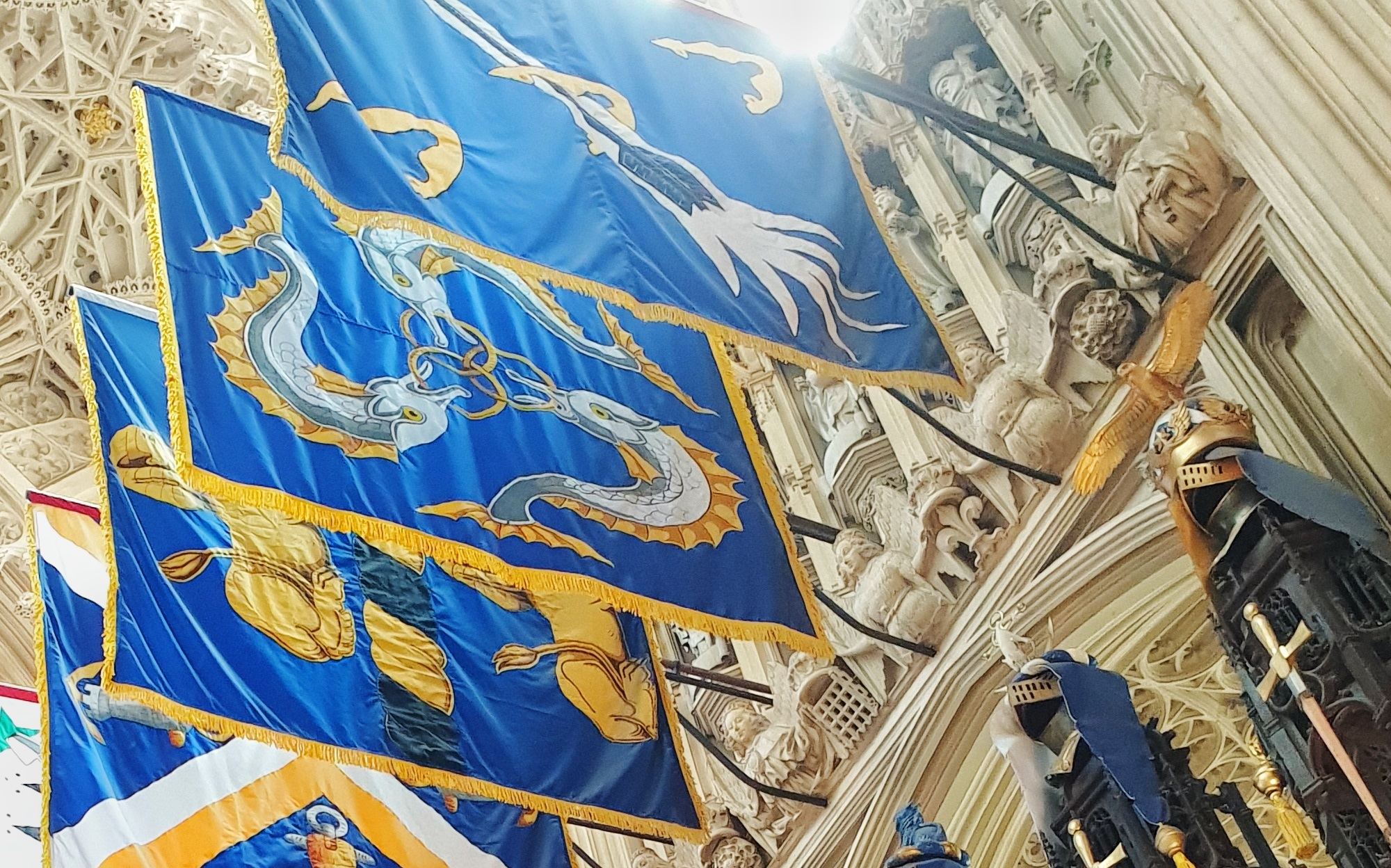
Boyce's banner among the banners of Knights Grand Cross of the Order of the Bath in Westminster Abbey

Knight Companion of the Most Noble Order of the Garter (KG)	2011
Knight Grand Cross of the Most Honourable Order of the Bath (GCB)	1999
Knight Commander of the Most Honourable Order of the Bath (KCB)	1995
Officer of the Most Excellent Order of the British Empire (OBE)	1982
Knight of the Most Venerable Order of the Hospital of Saint John of Jerusalem	27 November 2002
Queen Elizabeth II Golden Jubilee Medal	2002
Queen Elizabeth II Diamond Jubilee Medal	2012
Queen Elizabeth II Platinum Jubilee Medal	2022
Naval Long Service and Good Conduct Medal with 4 Bars	2016
Commander of the Legion of Merit (United States)	1999

== Arms ==
Coat of arms of Michael Boyce, Baron Boyce
Notes Created a life peer as Baron Boyce in 2003 Coronet Coronet of a Baron Crest A Foul Anchor Or, pendent from the crossbar by its tail a Mouse Opossum Argent, the eye ring and claws Azure. Escutcheon Azure, three interlacing Annulets Or, each held in the mouth by an Heraldic Dolphin embowed all in pairle Argent, finned Or. Supporters On either side a Sea-Lion Argent, winged finned and navally gorged Or, each grasping with the interior paw a Sword Argent, hilt pommel and quillions Or. Motto IPSIS FRETUS IMPEDIMENTIS POSSUM (I can trust myself with hindrances) Orders Order of the Garter circlet The collar as Knight Grand Cross of the Order of the Bath (Appointed KCB 1995 & GCB 1999); The badge as Officer of the Order of the British Empire Banner The banner of the Baron Boyce's arms used as Knight Companion of the Garter depicted at St George's Chapel.

Military offices
Preceded by Bruce Richardson	Flag Officer Sea Training; 1991–1992	Succeeded by John Tolhurst
Preceded by Sir Michael Layard	Second Sea Lord; 1995–1997	Succeeded by Sir John Brigstocke
Preceded by Sir Peter Abbott	Commander-in-Chief Fleet; 1997–1998	Succeeded by Sir Nigel Essenhigh
Preceded by Sir Jock Slater	First Sea Lord; 1998–2001	Succeeded by Sir Nigel Essenhigh
Preceded by Sir Charles Guthrie	Chief of the Defence Staff; 2001–2003	Succeeded by Sir Michael Walker
Honorary titles
Preceded by Queen Elizabeth The Queen Mother	Lord Warden of the Cinque Ports; 2005–2022	Succeeded by Sir George Zambellas
Preceded by Sir Donald Gosling	Vice-Admiral of the United Kingdom; 2021–2022	Succeeded by The Queen
Heraldic offices
Preceded by Sir Brian Kenny	King of Arms of the Order of the Bath; 2009–2018	Succeeded by Sir Stephen Dalton
