= Flag Officer, Surface Flotilla =

Surface Flotilla
- Active: 1990–2002
- Country: United Kingdom
- Branch: Royal Navy
- Size: Flotilla
- Part of: Commander-in-Chief Fleet
- Garrison/HQ: HMNB Portsmouth

Commanders
- First: Vice-Admiral A. Peter Woodhead
- Last: Rear-Admiral Alexander K. Backus

The Flag Officer, Surface Flotilla was a senior British Royal Navy appointment from 1990 to 2002.

When the post of Commander-in-Chief Fleet was created in 1971, three major subordinate appointments were also created: First Flotilla, Second Flotilla and Flag Officer, Carriers and Amphibious Ships, each held by a rear-admiral. In 1990 the First Flotilla was re-designated Surface Flotilla. In April 1992, the system was changed when the Third Flotilla was abolished and the remaining two flotilla commanders became: Flag Officer, Surface Flotilla – responsible for operational readiness and training – and Flag Officer, UK Task Group – who would command any deployed task group.

Exercise Teamwork was a major NATO biennial exercise in defense of Norway against a Soviet land and maritime threat. Teamwork '92 was the largest NATO exercise for more than a decade. Held in the northern spring of 1992, it included a total of over 200 ships and 300 aircraft, held in the North Atlantic. Vice Admiral Nicholas Hill-Norton, Flag Officer, Surface Flotilla, led the RN contingent as Commander, Anti-Submarine Warfare Striking Force (CASWF), with Commodore Amphibious Warfare (COMAW) embarked in HMS Fearless.

== Subordinate squadrons ==
Unit	Date	Notes
3rd Destroyer Squadron	1990–2002	
5th Destroyer Squadron	1990–2002	
1st Frigate Squadron	1990–2002	
3rd Frigate Squadron	1990–2002	
4th Frigate Squadron	1990–2002	
5th Frigate Squadron	1990–2002	
6th Frigate Squadron	1990–2002	
7th Frigate Squadron	1990–2002	
8th Frigate Squadron	1990–2002	

== Flag Officer Surface Flotilla ==
Flag Officer, Surface Flotilla (FOSF)
- Ensign of the Royal Navy
- Navy Department, Ministry of Defence
- Reports to: Commander-in-Chief, Fleet
- Nominator: Secretary of State for Defence
- Appointer: Prime Minister; Subject to formal approval by the Queen-in-Council
- Term length: Not fixed (typically 1–4 years)
- Inaugural holder: Vice-Admiral A. Peter Woodhead
- Formation: 1990–2002

=== Flag officers commanding ===
Included:

- Vice-Admiral A. Peter Woodhead: 1990 – September 1991
- Rear-Admiral A. Bruce Richardson: September 1991 – April 1992
- Vice-Admiral the Hon. Sir Nicholas Hill-Norton: April–November 1992
- Vice-Admiral Sir Michael C. Boyce: November 1992 – April 1995
- Vice-Admiral Sir John Brigstocke: April 1995 – July 1997
- Rear-Admiral Peter M. Franklyn: July 1997 – April 2000
- Rear-Admiral Ian A. Forbes: April 2000 – November 2001
- Rear-Admiral Alexander Backus: November 2001 – 2002
