= Nicholas Hill-Norton =

UK Royal Navy admiral

Vice Admiral The Honourable Sir Nicholas Hill-Norton KCB
- Born: 13 July 1939 (age 87)
- Military career
- Allegiance: United Kingdom
- Branch: Royal Navy
- Service years: 1957–1995
- Rank: Vice Admiral
- Commands: Flag Officer, Surface Flotilla; Flag Officer Gibraltar; HMS Invincible; HMS Southampton; Fishery Protection Squadron; HMS Antelope
- Conflicts: Cod Wars
- Awards: Knight Commander of the Order of the Bath

Vice Admiral Sir Nicholas John Hill-Norton, KCB (born 13 July 1939) is a retired senior Royal Navy officer who served as Deputy Chief of the Defence Staff (Commitments) from 1992 to 1995.

== Early life and family ==
Born the son of Lieutenant Peter Hill-Norton (later Admiral of the Fleet Lord Hill-Norton) and Eileen Linstow on 13 July 1939, Hill-Norton was educated at Marlborough College and the Royal Naval College Dartmouth.

In 1966, Hill-Norton married Ann Jennifer Mason; they had two sons and one daughter.

== Naval career ==
Hill-Norton joined the Royal Navy in 1957. He became commanding officer of the frigate HMS Antelope in 1974, commander of the Fishery Protection Squadron in 1978, commanding officer of the destroyer HMS Southampton in 1980 and commanding officer of the aircraft carrier HMS Invincible in 1983. He was appointed Director of Naval Staff Duties from April 1985 to June 1987. He went on to be Flag Officer Gibraltar in 1987, Flag Officer, Surface Flotilla and Commander Anti-Submarine Warfare Striking Force Atlantic in 1990 and Deputy Chief of the Defence Staff (Commitments) in 1992, before retiring in 1995.

== Later life ==
In retirement, Hill-Norton became a defence advisor to GEC-Marconi and then to BAE Systems. In 2000, he succeeded Sir John Foley as the Chairman of the British Greyhound Racing Board, a position he resigned in 2002.

Military offices
| Preceded by Sir Kenneth Hayr | Deputy Chief of the Defence Staff (Commitments); 1992–1995 | Succeeded by Sir Alexander Harley |
