= Flag Officer First Flotilla =

First Flotilla
- Active: 1971 – 1990
- Country: United Kingdom
- Branch: Royal Navy
- Size: Flotilla
- Part of: Commander-in-Chief Fleet
- Garrison/HQ: HMNB Portsmouth

Commanders
- First: Rear-Admiral John Ernle Pope
- Last: Vice-Admiral A. Peter Woodhead

The First Flotilla was a naval formation of the British Royal Navy commanded by the Flag Officer, First Flotilla from 1971 to 1990.

The Western Fleet and Far East Fleet were merged into the single Commander-in-Chief Fleet in 1971. Within this new structure three rear-admirals' appointments were created, the Flag Officer First Flotilla, Flag Officer Second Flotilla and Flag Officer, Carriers and Amphibious Ships. In 1990 the First, Second and Third Flotillas were unified to create a single formation called the Surface Flotilla.

== Flag Officer First Flotilla ==
Flag Officer, First Flotilla (FOF1)
- Ensign of the Royal Navy
- Navy Department, Ministry of Defence
- Reports to: Commander-in-Chief, Fleet
- Nominator: Secretary of State for Defence
- Appointer: Prime Minister; Subject to formal approval by the Queen-in-Council
- Term length: Not fixed (typically 1–4 years)
- Inaugural holder: Rear-Admiral John Ernle Pope
- Formation: 1971-1990

The Flag Officer, First Flotilla (FOF1) was a senior Royal Navy post that existed from 1971 to 1990.

Post holders included:

- Rear-Admiral John Ernle Pope: November 1969-July 1971
- Rear-Admiral Arthur M. Power: July 1971-January 1973
- Vice-Admiral Iwan G. Raikes: January 1973-March 1974
- Vice-Admiral Henry C. Leach: March 1974-November 1975
- Vice-Admiral Anthony S. Morton: November 1975-March 1977
- Rear-Admiral Robert R. Squires: March 1977-October 1978
- Rear-Admiral David J. Hallifax: October 1978-April 1980
- Rear-Admiral D. Conrad Jenkin (David Conrad): April 1980-July 1981. Led deployment which was planned to sail from May to December to the Far East. Ships appear to have included HMS Antrim, HMS Coventry (D118), HMS Galatea, and HMS Naiad at one point in the Far East.
- Rear-Admiral Sir John F. Woodward: July 1981-April 1983
- Rear-Admiral J. Jeremy Black: April 1983-April 1984
- Rear-Admiral Robin I. T. Hogg: April 1984-October 1986
- Vice-Admiral John B. Kerr: October 1986-July 1988
- Vice-Admiral John F. Coward: July 1988-September 1989
- Vice-Admiral A. Peter Woodhead: September 1989 – 1990

The post was redesignated Flag Officer, Surface Flotilla.

== Structure ==
At various times included:

Unit	Date	Notes
1st Frigate Squadron	1972-1981	
2nd Frigate Squadron	1972-1981	
3rd Frigate Squadron	1972-1977	
4th Frigate Squadron	1972-1976	
5th Frigate Squadron	1976-1977	
6th Frigate Squadron	1977-1981	
3rd Destroyer Squadron	1980-1990	

== See also ==
- Royal Navy Surface Fleet
