= HMS Ambuscade (F172) =

Type 21 or Amazon-class frigate of the Royal Navy and Pakistan Navy

- Ambuscade firing her 4.5-inch gun

History

United Kingdom
- Name: HMS Ambuscade
- Builder: Yarrow Shipbuilders
- Yard number: 1008
- Laid down: 1 September 1971
- Launched: 18 January 1973
- Commissioned: 5 September 1975
- Decommissioned: 28 July 1993
- Identification: Pennant number: F172
- Motto: Tempori insidior; ("I bide my time")
- Fate: Sold to Pakistan on 28 July 1993
- Notes: To be returned to the United Kingdom for preservation as a museum ship

General characteristics
- Class & type: Type 21 frigate
- Displacement: 3,250 tons full load
- Length: 384 ft (117 m)
- Beam: 41 ft 9 in (12.73 m)
- Draught: 19 ft 6 in (5.94 m)
- Propulsion: COGOG: 2 × Rolls-Royce Olympus gas turbines; 2 × Rolls-Royce Tyne RM1A gas turbines for cruising
- Speed: 32 knots (59 km/h; 37 mph)
- Range: 4,000 nmi (7,400 km; 4,600 mi) at 17 knots (31 km/h; 20 mph); 1,200 nmi (2,200 km; 1,400 mi) at 30 knots (56 km/h; 35 mph)
- Complement: 177
- Armament: 1 × 4.5 inch (114 mm) Mark 8 naval gun; 2 × Oerlikon 20 mm cannon; 4 × MM38 Exocet missiles; 1 × quadruple Sea Cat SAMs; 2 × triple ASW torpedo tubes; 2 × Corvus chaff launchers; 1 × Type 182 towed decoy
- Aircraft carried: 1 × Westland Wasp helicopter, later refitted for 1 × Westland Lynx

HMS Ambuscade is a retired Type 21 frigate of the Royal Navy. She was built by Yarrow Shipbuilders Ltd, Glasgow, Scotland. She entered service in 1975. Ambuscade took part in the Falklands War of 1982.

Ambuscade was sold to Pakistan in 1993 and served their navy as PNS Tariq until 2023.

== Service history ==
Ambuscade was launched on 18 January 1973 by Lady Griffin, wife of the Controller of the Navy, and was commissioned at Devonport on 5 September 1975. During 1976 and 1977 her commander was Peter Abbott who subsequently attained Flag rank.

Ambuscade took part in the Falklands War of 1982, serving as an Electronic Warfare picket ship to the Task Force, and taking part in several bombardments of Argentine positions. On 25 May Ambuscade was targeted by two Exocet missiles fired by Argentine Super Étendard strike aircraft. Ambuscade detected the aircraft at 30 miles and the missile launch at 22 miles, first with radar then visually, and fired chaff decoys in an attempt to confuse the missiles' seekers. Both missiles then locked on to SS Atlantic Conveyor impacting her port quarter, and setting her on fire. Atlantic Conveyor sank whilst under tow on 28 May. On the night of 13 June she fired 228 4.5-inch shells in support of 2 Para's assault of Wireless Ridge.

On 27 April 1983, Ambuscade was conducting tactical manoeuvres with ships of the United States Navy in the Indian Ocean. During the course of the exercise, she collided with the guided missile cruiser USS Dale, resulting in part of her bow being torn away. Ambuscade was laid up in Bombay for six weeks while a new bow was constructed and fitted. Whilst laid up, some of the crew performed as extras in the film On Wings of Fire. There was enough damage to have Dale dry docked when she returned to Jacksonville, Florida. Ambuscade was in collision with the trawler Ester Colleen in heavy fog off Torbay on 26 October 1983. The trawler was badly holed in the collision.

From November 1983 to February 1984, Ambuscade served as a West Indies Guardship. On 8 June 1984, Ambuscade went to the assistance of the schooner Stena of Sitoo, which had struck an object in the North Sea and been holed below the waterline.

In late 1984, suffering from cracking in her hull, she was taken in for refitting, with a steel plate being welded down each side of the ship. At the same time modifications were made to reduce hull noise and four Exocet launchers were added in front of the bridge.

In 1993, she was decommissioned and sold to Pakistan and recommissioned as PNS Tariq, which remained in service until 2023.

In December 2021, it was announced that it was hoped that when decommissioned, she could be returned to the United Kingdom for preservation as a museum ship.

In February 2023, it was announced that the Royal Navy was backing the plan to return her to the United Kingdom and will be preserved in Glasgow.

In October 2026 Navy Lookout published an article that assessed that the return of Ambuscade to the UK seemed unlikely.

List of deployments
From	To	Detail	Note
1975	1976	Sea trials	
1977	1977	Standing Naval Force Atlantic	6 months
1978	1978	5th Frigate Squadron and cruiser HMS Blake. Western Atlantic and Pacific	5 months
1979	1979	UK waters	
1979	1979	Belize and West Indies Guardship	
1980	1980	Refit at Devonport	
1981	1982	Sea training. Armilla Patrol	
1982	1982	South Atlantic (Falklands War)	
1983	1983	Collision while on Armilla Patrol	
1983	1984	West Indies Guardship	
1984	1986	Refit at Devonport	
1986	1987	Falklands Guardship	
1988	1988	West Indies Guardship	
1989	1989	UK and Europe	
1990	1990	Falklands Guardship	
1991	1991	West Indies Guardship	
1992	1992	Falklands Guardship	
1993	1993	Sold to the Pakistan Navy	

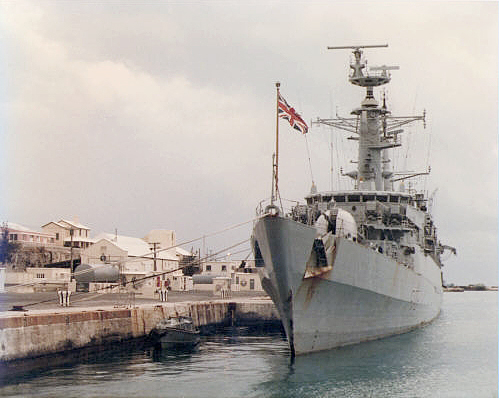
Ambuscade at the HM Dockyard Bermuda in 1988
