= List of ships attacked by Somali pirates in 2010 =

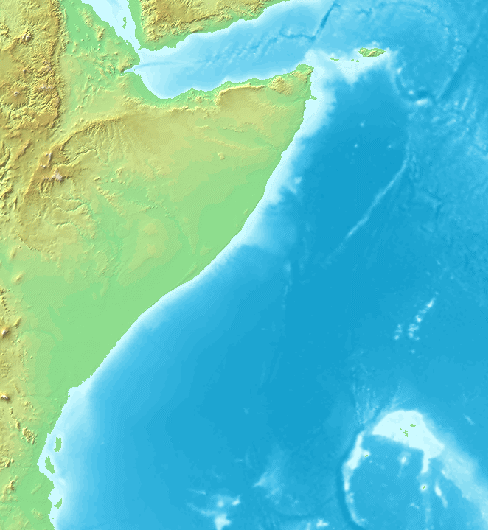
General area in the Indian Ocean where the pirates operated.

Pirates in the Indian Ocean have threatened international shipping since the mid-2000s. This list documents vessels attacked in 2010: for other years, see List of ships attacked by Somali pirates.

== January ==
Image	Flag (owner)	Name (class)	Crew (cargo)	Status	Date of attack	Coordinates
Image	Flag (owner)	Name (class)	Crew (cargo)	Status	Date of release	Ransom demanded
	Singapore (Indonesia)	Pramoni (Chemical tanker)	24 (5 Chinese, 17 Indonesian, 1 Nigerian, 1 Vietnamese) (Not known)	Released	January 1, 2010	unknown
	Singapore (Indonesia)	Pramoni (Chemical tanker)	24 (5 Chinese, 17 Indonesian, 1 Nigerian, 1 Vietnamese) (Not known)	Released	February 26, 2010	Not known
Pramoni was attacked by Somali pirates and captured while on its way to Kandla, India. The ship was owned by the Indonesian company Berlian Laju Tanker until 2008, when it was bought by the Norwegian company Platou. The Pramoni was hijacked by Somali pirates on 1 January 2010 in the Gulf of Aden in the International Recommended Transit Corridor and, after payment of a ransom, released along with its crew of 24 on 26 February 2010, during which time it was held at Eyl in Somalia. The pirates were returning from a trip to Yemen, where they had taken illegal migrants.
	South Korea (United Kingdom)	MV Asian Glory (Cargo ship)	26 (Cars)	Released	January 2, 2010	unknown
	South Korea (United Kingdom)	MV Asian Glory (Cargo ship)	26 (Cars)	Released	June 11, 2010	Not known
Asian Glory was attacked by Somali pirates and captured some 620 miles (1,000 km) off the coast of Somalia. Vessel released 11 June 2010.
	Cambodia	MV Layla S (Cargo ship)	(Unknown)	Legal Dispute	January 27, 2010	unknown
	Cambodia	MV Layla S (Cargo ship)	(Unknown)	Legal Dispute		None
Layla S vessel was held due to a legal dispute off the Somaliland port of Berbera.

== February ==
Image	Flag (owner)	Name (class)	Crew (cargo)	Status	Date of attack	Coordinates
Image	Flag (owner)	Name (class)	Crew (cargo)	Status	Date of release	Ransom demanded
	North Korea (Libya)	Rim (Cargo ship)	17 (Clay)	Re-captured by crew	February 2, 2010	unknown
	North Korea (Libya)	Rim (Cargo ship)	17 (Clay)	Re-captured by crew	June 2, 2010	None
Rim was attacked by Somali pirates and captured on 2 February 2010. Crew re-captured ship 2 June 2010.
	Antigua and Barbuda (Slovenia)	Ariella (Cargo ship)	25 (Steel)	Released	February 5, 2010	unknown
	Antigua and Barbuda (Slovenia)	Ariella (Cargo ship)	25 (Steel)	Released	February 5, 2010	None
Ariella was attacked by Somali pirates and captured on 5 February 2010. After sending a distress call a helicopter from Royal Danish Navy HDMS Absalon was dispatched. Danish Frogman Corps special forces from Absalon later boarded finding the crew unharmed and the pirates had apparently escaped.
	Tanzania	MV Barakaale 1 (Cargo ship)	Unknown (Unknown)	Capture failed	February 23, 2010	unknown
	Tanzania	MV Barakaale 1 (Cargo ship)	Unknown (Unknown)	Capture failed	February 23, 2010	None
Barakaale 1 was attacked by pirates in a skiff. A distress call was made and a helicopter from USS Farragut was despatched. The pirates were arrested by a boarding team dispatched from USS Farragut.

== March ==
Image	Flag (owner)	Name (class)	Crew (cargo)	Status	Date of attack	Coordinates
Image	Flag (owner)	Name (class)	Crew (cargo)	Status	Date of release	Ransom demanded
	Saudi Arabia	MV Al Nisr al Saudi (Oil tanker)	14 (13 Sri Lankans, 1 Greek) (Crude oil)	Released	March 3, 2010	unknown
	Saudi Arabia	MV Al Nisr al Saudi (Oil tanker)	14 (13 Sri Lankans, 1 Greek) (Crude oil)	Released	December 7, 2010	Paid (amount unknown)
On March 3, 2010, the MV Al Nisr al Saudi, a Saudi-owned tanker was hijacked on its way from Japan to Jeddah, Saudi Arabia. The tanker has a dry weight of 5,136 tonnes. The ship and its crew were released on December 7, 2010, after an undisclosed amount of ransom was paid to the hijackers.
	Marshall Islands (Norway)	MV UBT Ocean (Oil tanker)	Unknown (Crude oil)	Released	March 5, 2010	unknown
	Marshall Islands (Norway)	MV UBT Ocean (Oil tanker)	Unknown (Crude oil)	Released	July 20, 2010	Unknown
UBT Ocean was seized by pirates while carrying oil between the United Arab Emirates and Tanzania, and was sailed towards a Somali port. The ship is technically and commercially operated from Singapore. Its crew are all from Burma. It was released on 20 July 2010.
	Netherlands	HNLMS Tromp (De Zeven Provinciën-class frigate)	Unknown (None)	13 pirates captured and released to mother skiff after cleared of weapons	March 17, 2010	unknown
	Netherlands	HNLMS Tromp (De Zeven Provinciën-class frigate)	Unknown (None)	13 pirates captured and released to mother skiff after cleared of weapons		None
When Tromp was spotted by the pirates, they began to approach the ship in two skiffs at high speed. As they closed to a distance of 3 nautical miles (5.6 km; 3.5 mi) two bursts of heavy machine gun warning shots were fired by HNLMS TROMP. The two attack skiffs stopped their approach, attempted to flee and threw several undefined objects into the water. Afterwards, the Tromp boarding team found 13 suspected pirates, All 13 members were arrested and were returned to the mother skiff with sufficient fuel, water and food so they could reach the Seychelles, according to EU directives. The Seychellen Coastguard was informed of the upcoming skiff. The two attack skiffs were destroyed by HNLMS Tromp and piracy attributes are seized.
	Panama (United Arab Emirates)	MV Almezaan (Cargo vessel)	Unknown (Unknown)	Capture failed, 1 pirate killed, 6 pirates arrested.	March 23, 2010	unknown
	Panama (United Arab Emirates)	MV Almezaan (Cargo vessel)	Unknown (Unknown)	Capture failed, 1 pirate killed, 6 pirates arrested.		None
Almezaan was attacked on 23 March 2010 by Somali pirates in a skiff. An armed private vessel protection team was on board and engaged the pirates in a gunfight. One pirate was killed. A second attack on Almezaan was also repelled. The Spanish frigate Navarra responded to a distress signal, despatching a helicopter which stopped both skiffs after firing warning shots. Six pirates were arrested, and the body of a seventh was recovered. In reaction to the incident, the International Maritime Bureau expressed concern that the incident would lead to an increase in violence from Somali pirates when capturing ships.
	Panama (United Arab Emirates)	MV Iceberg 1 (Roll-on roll-off)	24 (9 Yemenis, 6 Indians, 4 Ghanaians, 2 Sudanese, 2 Pakistani, 1 Filipino) (Mechanical instruments)	Rescued by Puntland Maritime Police Force. 22 crew rescued. 1 crew missing (presumed dead), 1 crew committed suicide, 3 pirates killed.	March 29, 2010	unknown
	Panama (United Arab Emirates)	MV Iceberg 1 (Roll-on roll-off)	24 (9 Yemenis, 6 Indians, 4 Ghanaians, 2 Sudanese, 2 Pakistani, 1 Filipino) (Mechanical instruments)	Rescued by Puntland Maritime Police Force. 22 crew rescued. 1 crew missing (presumed dead), 1 crew committed suicide, 3 pirates killed.	December 22, 2012	$8 million (initially) $14 million (later)
On March 29, 2010, the Iceberg 1, a 3,960 dry weight tonnes vessel was hijacked 10 nautical miles from the port of Aden, Gulf of Aden while heading to Jebel Ali Port, United Arab Emirates and was held at Kulub at the North-Eastern Indian Ocean, off the coast of Somalia. The ship is considered the longest ship to have been held in captivity and was rescued after two years and nine months. The crew were tortured and the ransom was increased to $14 million. On December 23, Puntland Maritime Police Force was able to board the ship and rescue the 22 surviving crew members after a two week siege which killed 3 of the pirates.
	Taiwan	FV Jih-Chun Tsai 68 (Fishing vessel)	13 (10 Indonesians, 2 Chinese, 1 Taiwanese) (Fish)	Sunk	March 30, 2010	unknown
	Taiwan	FV Jih-Chun Tsai 68 (Fishing vessel)	13 (10 Indonesians, 2 Chinese, 1 Taiwanese) (Fish)	Sunk	May 20, 2011	Yes
On March 30, 2010, the FV Jih-Chun Tsai 68, a Taiwanese-owned and flagged fishing vessel was attacked together with sister ship, Jui Man Fa, which managed to escape. The vessels were conducting fishing operations near Somali waters and the Seychelles. The 10 Indonesians were released in March 2011. On May 20, 2011, the USS Stephen W. Groves exchanged fire with the FV Jih-Chun Tsai 68 and the Taiwanese captain and three pirates were killed. The two Chinese crewmen were rescued but the ship was sunk.

== April ==
Image	Flag (owner)	Name (class)	Crew (cargo)	Status	Date of attack	Coordinates
Image	Flag (owner)	Name (class)	Crew (cargo)	Status	Date of release	Ransom demanded
USS Nicholas	United States	USS Nicholas (Oliver Hazard Perry-class frigate)	Unknown (N/A)	Attack failed, five pirates captured, tried, convicted, sentenced to life in prison	April 1, 2010	unknown
USS Nicholas	United States	USS Nicholas (Oliver Hazard Perry-class frigate)	Unknown (N/A)	Attack failed, five pirates captured, tried, convicted, sentenced to life in prison		None
USS Nicholas (FFG-47) was attacked by pirates in international waters west of the Seychelles. The United States Navy frigate returned fire sinking a pirate skiff and eventually confiscating a suspected pirate mother ship. Five pirates were captured.
	South Korea (Singapore)	MV Samho Dream (Supertanker)	24 (Crude oil)	Released	April 4, 2010	unknown
	South Korea (Singapore)	MV Samho Dream (Supertanker)	24 (Crude oil)	Released	November 6, 2010	$9.5 million
Samho Dream was captured on April 4 by Somali pirates. Reported released in November 2010 after payment of $9 million ransom.
	Germany	MV Taipan (Container ship)	13 (Unknown)	Capture failed, 10 pirates captured	April 5, 2010	unknown
	Germany	MV Taipan (Container ship)	13 (Unknown)	Capture failed, 10 pirates captured	April 5, 2010	None
The MV Taipan was boarded by pirates approximately 500 nmi (930 km; 580 mi) east off the Somali coast. The crew were able to retreat to a safe room onboard and to disable the engine. Their call for help was responded to by the Dutch frigate HNLMS Tromp whose crew entered the vessel and fought down the pirates when initial negotiations failed. Ten pirates were taken into custody while the Taipan's crew was released unharmed.
USS Ashland and burned pirate skiff, 10 April 2010.	United States	USS Ashland (Whidbey Island-class dock landing ship)	Unknown (N/A)	Attack failed, six pirates captured	April 10, 2010	unknown
USS Ashland and burned pirate skiff, 10 April 2010.	United States	USS Ashland (Whidbey Island-class dock landing ship)	Unknown (N/A)	Attack failed, six pirates captured		None
Pirates fired shots at the USS Ashland 330 nmi (610 km; 380 mi) off the coast of Djibouti. The United States Navy ship returned fire, setting the pirates' skiff ablaze. Six pirates abandoned the skiff and were rescued by personnel from the Ashland.
	Saint Vincent and the Grenadines (Seychelles)	MV Rak Afrikana (Cargo ship)	11 Indians, 6 Pakistanis, 8 Tanzanians (Unknown)	Released	April 11, 2010	unknown
	Saint Vincent and the Grenadines (Seychelles)	MV Rak Afrikana (Cargo ship)	11 Indians, 6 Pakistanis, 8 Tanzanians (Unknown)	Released	March 9, 2011	Unknown as of 21 November 2026
The MV Rak Afrikana cargo ship was seized approximately 280 nmi (520 km; 320 mi) west of the Seychelles.
	Thailand	MV Prantalay 11, 12, and 14 (Fishing vessels)	77 (Unknown)	11 recaptured by Indian Navy, 12 unknown, 14 sunk	April 18, 2010	unknown
	Thailand	MV Prantalay 11, 12, and 14 (Fishing vessels)	77 (Unknown)	11 recaptured by Indian Navy, 12 unknown, 14 sunk		Unknown as of 21 November 2026
The fishing boats MV Prantalay 11, 12, and 14 were captured approximately 1,900 km (1,200 mi) east of Somalia, near the Indian coast, the farthest yet Somali pirates have struck. All three ships were captured by, and used as supply ships for, the pirates. Prantalay 14 was later sunk by the Indian Navy on January 28, 2011, while 11 was recaptured.

== May ==
Image	Flag (owner)	Name (class)	Crew (cargo)	Status	Date of attack	Coordinates
Image	Flag (owner)	Name (class)	Crew (cargo)	Status	Date of release	Ransom demanded
	Liberia (Russia)	MV Moscow University (Tanker)	19 Filipinos, 2 Greeks, 1, Romanian, 1 Ukrainians (Crude oil)	Rescued by a Russian warship; hijackers arrested	May 5, 2010	unknown
	Liberia (Russia)	MV Moscow University (Tanker)	19 Filipinos, 2 Greeks, 1, Romanian, 1 Ukrainians (Crude oil)	Rescued by a Russian warship; hijackers arrested	May 6, 2010	None
See: MV Moscow University hijacking The Liberian flagged Moscow University was attacked by Somali pirates in two speedboats when some 500 nautical miles (930 km) off the coast of Somalia. The Udaloy-class destroyer Marshal Shaposhnikov was reported to be en route to the aid of the crew of Moscow University. The crew was reported to have locked themselves in the ship's radar room. On 6 May, Russian Naval Infantry from the Marshal Shaposhnikov landed on the hijacked vessel and rescued it, killing one pirate and detaining ten. The entire crew escaped unharmed.
SS Oceanic	Malta (Japan)	SS Oceanic (Cruise ship)	Unknown (Unknown)	Avoided capture; hijackers arrested	May 2010, exact date unknown	unknown
SS Oceanic	Malta (Japan)	SS Oceanic (Cruise ship)	Unknown (Unknown)	Avoided capture; hijackers arrested	Attack repelled	None
According to reports in Japanese and Croatian newspapers, the Japanese-owned but Maltese-flagged educational cruise ship Oceanic came under attack off the coast of Yemen sometime during the week between 3 and 9 May 2010. The ship was attacked with grenades, but managed to avoid capture by adopting zig-zag manoeuvres and blasting the pirates with high-pressure water hoses. Reportedly the pirates were subsequently apprehended by NATO forces.
	Taiwan	FV Tai Yuan 227 (Fishing boat)	9 Chinese, 7 Kenyans, 3 Vietnamese, 3 Filipinos, 2 Mozambicans ()	Released	May 6, 2010	unknown
	Taiwan	FV Tai Yuan 227 (Fishing boat)	9 Chinese, 7 Kenyans, 3 Vietnamese, 3 Filipinos, 2 Mozambicans ()	Released	January 28, 2011	
The FV Tai Yuan 227, a Taiwan-flagged fishing vessel was hijacked on May 6, 2010. The fishing vessel is approximately 50 m (164 ft 1 in) long. The Taipei Rescue Command Center confirmed that the vessel had been seized in an incident report.
	United States (Germany)	MT Marida Marguerite (Chemical tanker)	19 Indians, 2 Bangladeshi, 1 Ukrainian (Chemicals)	Released	May 8, 2010	unknown
	United States (Germany)	MT Marida Marguerite (Chemical tanker)	19 Indians, 2 Bangladeshi, 1 Ukrainian (Chemicals)	Released	December 28, 2010	$5,500,000
On May 8, 2010, the MT Marida Marguerite, a 13,273 DWT chemical tanker, was hijacked by Somali pirates 120 nmi (220 km; 140 mi) south of the Omani port of Salalah. The ship was reported to have been released on 28 December after a ransom of $5,500,000 (£3,600,000) had been paid.
	Liberia (Greece)	MV Eleni P (Bulk carrier)	23 ()	Released	May 12, 2010	unknown
	Liberia (Greece)	MV Eleni P (Bulk carrier)	23 ()	Released	December 11, 2010	
The MV Eleni P, a Liberian-flagged bulk carrier ship, was hijacked on May 12, 2010, about 250 nmi (460 km; 290 mi) off the coast of Oman. On December 11, 2011, after seven months, the ship and its crew were released.

== June ==
Image	Flag (owner)	Name (class)	Crew (cargo)	Status	Date of attack	Coordinates
Image	Flag (owner)	Name (class)	Crew (cargo)	Status	Date of release	Ransom demanded
	Panama (United Arab Emirates)	MV QSM Dubai (Cargo ship)	24 (Egypt, Pakistan, Bangladesh and Ghana) (Unknown)	Ship and 23 crew rescued by Puntland Security Forces. Captain killed by pirates.	June 2, 2010	unknown
	Panama (United Arab Emirates)	MV QSM Dubai (Cargo ship)	24 (Egypt, Pakistan, Bangladesh and Ghana) (Unknown)	Ship and 23 crew rescued by Puntland Security Forces. Captain killed by pirates.	June 3, 2010	unknown
The Panamanian-flagged MV QSM Dubai was captured by Somali pirates in the Gulf of Aden. Somali government security forces retook the ship and arrested seven pirates. The Pakistani captain was killed by the pirates, while the remaining crew were freed by the Puntland Security Forces.
	Singapore (China)	MV Golden Blessing (Chemical tanker)	19 (Ethylene glycol)	Released	June 28, 2010	unknown
	Singapore (China)	MV Golden Blessing (Chemical tanker)	19 (Ethylene glycol)	Released	November 6, 2010	$2.8 million
The Singaporean-flagged Chinese-chartered chemical tanker MV Golden Blessing was hijacked in the Gulf of Aden and its Chinese crew of 19 was taken hostage. The ship was carrying a cargo of ethylene glycol, a chemical used for antifreeze. Reported released in November 2010 on payment of $2.8 million.

== July ==
Image	Flag (owner)	Name (class)	Crew (cargo)	Status	Date of attack	Coordinates
Image	Flag (owner)	Name (class)	Crew (cargo)	Status	Date of release	Ransom demanded
	Marshall Islands (Greece)	MT Motivator (Chemical tanker)	18 (Lubricating oil)	Released	July 4, 2010	unknown
	Marshall Islands (Greece)	MT Motivator (Chemical tanker)	18 (Lubricating oil)	Released	January 16, 2011	Unknown
The Marshall Islands-flagged chemical tanker MT Motivator reported coming under small arms fire in the northern Bab-el-Mandeb area of the Red Sea before losing contact on July 4. The following day, it was confirmed that the ship had been boarded and hijacked. The ship had a crew of 18 Filipinos and was carrying a cargo of lubricating oil.

== August ==
Image	Flag (owner)	Name (class)	Crew (cargo)	Status	Date of attack	Coordinates
Image	Flag (owner)	Name (class)	Crew (cargo)	Status	Date of release	Ransom demanded
	Panama (Egypt)	MV Suez (Merchant vessel)	11 Egyptians, 6 Indians, 4 Pakistanis, 2 Sri Lankans (Cement bags)	Released	August 2, 2010	unknown
	Panama (Egypt)	MV Suez (Merchant vessel)	11 Egyptians, 6 Indians, 4 Pakistanis, 2 Sri Lankans (Cement bags)	Released	June 13, 2011	2.1 million dollars
Operation Umeed-e-Nuh On August 2, 2010, the MV Suez, a merchant vessel was attacked and hijacked by small arms fire from Somali pirates. After the attack, navies in the area attempted to make contact with the MV Suez, but were unable to do so. The MV Suez has a deadweight tonnage of 17,300 tonnes. A ransom of $2.1 million was paid by Pakistani human rights activist Ansar Burney for the release of the vessel and its crew; and escort to Pakistan by two Pakistani warships - PNS Babur and PNS Zulfiqar.
	Saint Vincent and the Grenadines (Syria)	MV Syrian Star (Freighter)	24 (Sugar)	Released	August 6, 2010	unknown
	Saint Vincent and the Grenadines (Syria)	MV Syrian Star (Freighter)	24 (Sugar)	Released	August 7, 2010	6.45 crore rupees
The Saint Vincent and the Grenadines-flagged freighter MV Syrian Star was hijacked in the Gulf of Aden and its Syrian and Egyptian crew of 24 (22 Syrian, 2 Egyptian) was taken hostage. The pirates abandoned the ship a day later, leaving on a lifeboat, leaving behind their own skiff. Two crew members were injured in the hijacking.

== September ==
Image	Flag (owner)	Name (class)	Crew (cargo)	Status	Date of attack	Coordinates
Image	Flag (owner)	Name (class)	Crew (cargo)	Status	Date of release	Ransom demanded
USS Dubuque (LPD 8) and MV Magellan Star, 9 September 2010	Antigua and Barbuda (Germany)	MV Magellan Star (Container ship)	11 (Unknown)	Surrendered, 9 pirates captured	September 8, 2010	unknown
USS Dubuque (LPD 8) and MV Magellan Star, 9 September 2010	Antigua and Barbuda (Germany)	MV Magellan Star (Container ship)	11 (Unknown)	Surrendered, 9 pirates captured	September 9, 2010	None
Nine Somali pirates seized the German-owned MV Magellan Star on 8 September 2010. The crew locked themselves in a safe room. On 9 September the vessel was boarded by U.S. forces who took control after the pirates surrendered without incident.
	Malta (Greece)	MT Olib G (Chemical tanker)	15 Georgians, 3 Turkish (Chemicals)	Released after ransom paid	September 9, 2010	unknown
	Malta (Greece)	MT Olib G (Chemical tanker)	15 Georgians, 3 Turkish (Chemicals)	Released after ransom paid	January 8, 2012	$15 million ($3 million eventually paid)
On September 8, 2010, the MT Olib G was hijacked in the eastern part of the protected Gulf of Aden corridor. The tanker has a tonnage of 6,375 tonnes. The pirates demanded a ransom of $15 million, but eventually settled for $3 million. The tanker was held 38 nmi (70 km; 44 mi) off of Eyl, at the northeastern part of the Indian Ocean coast of Somalia.
	Panama (United Arab Emirates)	MT Asphalt Venture (Asphalt tanker)	15 Indians (Asphalt)	Released	September 28, 2010	unknown
	Panama (United Arab Emirates)	MT Asphalt Venture (Asphalt tanker)	15 Indians (Asphalt)	Released	April 15, 2011	$3.5 million (unknown payment made)
On September 28, 2010, the MT Asphalt Venture, an asphalt tanker was hijacked by Somali pirates while on its way from Mombasa to Durban. The vessel was held at Kulub, the northeastern Indian Ocean coast of Somalia. In April 2011 the vessel with 8 of her crew was released while the remaining 7 crew members were detained ashore. Following negotiations, the release of the remaining 7 men in October 2014 was arranged after a modest payment was made to cover the logistical and transport costs of the group holding the men.

== October ==
Image	Flag (owner)	Name (class)	Crew (cargo)	Status	Date of attack	Coordinates
Image	Flag (owner)	Name (class)	Crew (cargo)	Status	Date of release	Ransom demanded
	Kenya (South Korea)	FV Golden Wave (Fishing ship)	2 Koreans, 2 Chinese, 39 Kenyans (Crab)	Released	October 9, 2010	unknown
	Kenya (South Korea)	FV Golden Wave (Fishing ship)	2 Koreans, 2 Chinese, 39 Kenyans (Crab)	Released	February 9, 2011	N/A
The 43 sailor crew aboard the 241-ton FV Golden Wave, formerly known as the Keummi 305, a crab-fishing vessel, was captured off the coast of Kenya's Lamu Island. The hijacked location was more than 400 km (250 mi) away from the pirates' base. The Finnish warship Pohjanmaa, in its first mission as part of ENAVFOR, provided medical aid and basic necessities. South Korean government requested assistance be given.
	Panama (Japan)	MV Izumi (Cargo ship)	20 Filipinos (Steel)	Released	October 10, 2010	unknown
	Panama (Japan)	MV Izumi (Cargo ship)	20 Filipinos (Steel)	Released	February 26, 2011	None
The 14,000 tonne NYK-Hinode Line Ltd ship was captured 80 nmi (150 km; 92 mi) off the coast of Mombasa, Kenya and subsequently was reported as being anchored near Haradheere, a pirate stronghold. Kenyan police detained 2 British and 1 Kenyan suspect from released MV Izumi. Live and spent ammunition found on board following police investigation.
	Singapore (Germany)	MV York (Tanker)	17 (Liquefied gas)	Crew released	October 23, 2010	unknown
	Singapore (Germany)	MV York (Tanker)	17 (Liquefied gas)	Crew released	March 10, 2011	N/A
MV York was traveling from Mombasa to Mahe in the Seychelles when captured 105 mi (169 km) off the coast of Kenya. It is now being used as a large pirate support ship.
	Antigua and Barbuda (Germany)	MV Beluga Fortune (Cargo ship)	16 ()	Released	October 24, 2010	unknown
	Antigua and Barbuda (Germany)	MV Beluga Fortune (Cargo ship)	16 ()	Released	October 25, 2010	None
Beluga Fortune was captured 1,200 mi (1,900 km) east of Mombasa while en route from United Arab Emirates to South Africa. The ship was freed a day after being taken captured. The crew, when attacked, had stopped the engine, blocked the fuel lines, switched off all systems on the bridge and hid in a strongroom which had communications and food supplies. Pirates had already left by the time British frigate HMS Montrose arrived 15 hours later.
	South Africa	SY Choizil (Yacht)	2 ()	Released	October 26, 2010	unknown
	South Africa	SY Choizil (Yacht)	2 ()	Released	June 21, 2012	None
SY Choizil was captured by Somali pirates and taken to the port of Barawe, Somalia. The skipper was rescued by the French frigate Floréal but his two crew were captured and taken to Somalia. They were released after 20 months of captivity.
	Panama (Liberia)	MV Polar (Product tanker)	16 Filipinos, 3 Greeks, 3 Montenegrins, 1 Romanian, 1 Serbian (Unknown)	Released	October 30, 2010	unknown
	Panama (Liberia)	MV Polar (Product tanker)	16 Filipinos, 3 Greeks, 3 Montenegrins, 1 Romanian, 1 Serbian (Unknown)	Released	August 26, 2011	None
On October 30, 2010, MV Polar was hijacked 684 mi (1,101 km) east of the Indian Ocean island of Socotra. The vessel weighs 72,825 tonnes. According to the Seafarers Network of Greece, on November 22, 2010, one Filipino seafarer was reported to have suffered and succumbed to a heart attack.

== November ==
Image	Flag (owner)	Name (class)	Crew (cargo)	Status	Date of attack	Coordinates
Image	Flag (owner)	Name (class)	Crew (cargo)	Status	Date of release	Ransom demanded
	Panama	MV Hannibal II (Chemical tanker)	23 Tunisians, 4 Filipinos, 1 Croatian, 1 Georgian, 1 Russian, 1 Moroccan (Vegetable oil)	Released	12 November 2010	unknown
	Panama	MV Hannibal II (Chemical tanker)	23 Tunisians, 4 Filipinos, 1 Croatian, 1 Georgian, 1 Russian, 1 Moroccan (Vegetable oil)	Released	17 March 2011	
Hannibal II was captured 860 nmi (1,590 km; 990 mi) east of the Horn of Africa. The vessel was released on 17 March 2011; it wasn't known whether a ransom had been paid or not.
	Panama (China)	MV Yuan Xiang (Cargo ship)	29 Chinese (unknown)	Released	November 14, 2010	unknown
	Panama (China)	MV Yuan Xiang (Cargo ship)	29 Chinese (unknown)	Released	June 8, 2011	unknown
Yuan Xiang was captured in the Arabian Sea.
	Malaysia	MV Albedo (Cargo ship)	23 (7 Pakistanis, 7 Bangladeshis, 6 Sri Lankans, 2 Indians, 1 Iranian) (unknown)	Ship sunk, crew released	November 26, 2010	unknown
	Malaysia	MV Albedo (Cargo ship)	23 (7 Pakistanis, 7 Bangladeshis, 6 Sri Lankans, 2 Indians, 1 Iranian) (unknown)	Ship sunk, crew released	August 1, 2012 (date of release of 7 Pakistani crew members)	$ 2.85 million ($ 1.1 million paid for the release of 7 Pakistani crew members)
During the early morning hours of November 26, 2010, the MV Albedo was captured by Somali pirates 900 nautical miles east of Mogadishu. The crew consisted of 23 people from Bangladesh, India, Iran, Pakistan, and Sri Lanka. One Indian crew member has since died of cholera and his dead body is still on board the ship. A private initiative of several Pakistani families and groups was established in order to raise money for the release of the entire crew. By August 2012 US$ 1.1 million had been raised. That fell short of the US$ 2.85 million demanded by the pirates, but they agreed to release the Pakistani members of the crew for the raised amount. On August 1, 2012 the 7 Pakistani crew members were released after almost two years in captivity. As of 2015, all surviving crew members were returned safely home.

== December ==
Image	Flag (owner)	Name (class)	Crew (cargo)	Status	Date of attack	Coordinates
Image	Flag (owner)	Name (class)	Crew (cargo)	Status	Date of release	Ransom demanded
	Bangladesh	MV Jahan Moni (Cargo ship)	25 (Nickel ore)	Released	December 5, 2010	unknown
	Bangladesh	MV Jahan Moni (Cargo ship)	25 (Nickel ore)	Released	March 14, 2011	US$4 million
Jahan Moni was captured 300 nmi (560 km; 350 mi) off the coast of Kochi, India
	Liberia (United States)	MV Panama (Cargo ship)	23 ()	Released	December 10, 2010	unknown
	Liberia (United States)	MV Panama (Cargo ship)	23 ()	Released	September 13, 2011	$7 million
During the afternoon of December 10, 2010, the MV Panama was captured by two armed skiffs operated by five pirates, approximately 80 mi (130 km) east of the Tanzanian-Mozambique border. The pirates were armed with rocket-propelled grenades. The crew of 23 were all from Myanmar.
	Panama (Liberia)	MV Renuar (Cargo ship)	24 ()	Released	December 11, 2010	unknown
	Panama (Liberia)	MV Renuar (Cargo ship)	24 ()	Released	April 23, 2011	
On December 10, 2010, the MV Renuar was captured by two armed skiffs supported by a mother ship, approximately 1,000 mi (1,600 km) east of Somalia. The pirates fired rocket-propelled grenades and small arms at the ship.
	Panama (United Arab Emirates)	MV Orna (Cargo ship)	19 (18 Syrians and 1 Sri Lankan) (Coal)	Ship and 18 crew released, 1 crew member executed.	December 20, 2010	unknown
	Panama (United Arab Emirates)	MV Orna (Cargo ship)	19 (18 Syrians and 1 Sri Lankan) (Coal)	Ship and 18 crew released, 1 crew member executed.	October 20, 2012	unknown ($600,000 paid)
On December 20, 2010, the MV Orna, a cargo ship transporting coal from South Africa to India, was captured by Somali pirates 400 mi (640 km) northeast of the Seychelles, after firing rocket-propelled grenades and small arms at the ship. At least four pirates boarded the MV Orna. The MV Orna has a deadweight tonnage of 27,915 tonnes. The ship was initially used as a pirate mother-ship. The ship and 13 of its crew were released after a payment of $600,000 was made. 6 crew members were taken as hostages onshore. 1 Syrian hostage was previously executed by the pirates for delayed payment. The rest of the crew were released 3 months later without ransom.
	Thailand	MV Thor Nexus (Cargo ship)	27 (Unknown)	Released	December 26, 2010	unknown
	Thailand	MV Thor Nexus (Cargo ship)	27 (Unknown)	Released	April 12, 2011	
While on its way from Jebel Ali, UAE to Bangladesh, MV Thor Nexus was captured in the Arabian Sea on December 26, 2010.
	Antigua and Barbuda (Germany)	MV Ems River (Cargo ship)	(Unknown)	Released	December 26, 2010	unknown
	Antigua and Barbuda (Germany)	MV Ems River (Cargo ship)	(Unknown)	Released	March 2, 2011	
Ems River was captured on December 26, 2010 at a position 175 nautical miles (324 km; 201 mi) north east of Salalah, Oman.
	Mozambique (Spain)	FV Vega 5 (Fishing vessel)	24 ()	Rescued by Indian Navy; 9 crewmembers missing	Before December 28, 2010 (confirmed December 31, 2010)	unknown
	Mozambique (Spain)	FV Vega 5 (Fishing vessel)	24 ()	Rescued by Indian Navy; 9 crewmembers missing	March 15, 2011	
According to the EU Navfor, the FV Vega 5, a fishing vessel, was captured about 200 nmi (370 km; 230 mi) southwest of the Comoros Islands. On December 31, 2010, the EU Navfor observed the vessel towing what appeared to be a pirate skiff, heading north. The EU naval spokesman stated that the Somali pirates have previously not entered waters as far south as Mozambique.
