= 4th Frigate Squadron (United Kingdom) =

- Active: July 1948 – August 2004
- Country: United Kingdom
- Branch: Royal Navy
- Size: Squadron

Commanders
- First: Captain Ralph C. Medley
- Last: Captain Mark Anderson

The 4th Frigate Squadron was an operational squadron of the Royal Navy from 1948 to 2004.

== History ==
During its existence, the squadron included Loch-class, Whitby-class, Rothesay-class, Leander-class, Type 21 and Type 23 frigates.

From January 1949 the squadron was with the Far East Fleet, including HMS Cardigan Bay (K630), HMS Morecambe Bay, and HMS Mounts Bay. Ships of the squadron saw service in the Korean War, the Beira Patrol, the Cod Wars, the Silver Jubilee Fleet Review, the Falklands War and the Second Gulf War.

In the 1970s Juno was one of the six Leanders used as the fictional "HMS Hero" for the BBC TV drama series Warship. All members of the crew were given Hero cap tallies for filming purposes.

The squadron was made up of Amazon class frigates in the 1980s. Except for HMS Amazon (F169), all the Amazon-class frigates took part in the 1982 Falklands War. They were worked hard, performing extensive shore-bombardment missions and providing anti-submarine and anti-aircraft defence for the task force.

The squadron disbanded in 2004.

== Captain (F), 4th Frigate Squadron ==
Commander	Ship	Dates
Captain Ralph C. Medley	HMS Cardigan Bay	July 1948-January 1950
Captain Walter L.M. Brown	HMS Cardigan Bay	January 1950-August 1951
Captain Hugh C.B. Coleridge	HMS Cardigan Bay	August 1951-February 1953
Captain Bryan C. Durant	HMS Cardigan Bay	February 1953-October 1954
Captain E. Nigel Pumphrey	HMS Cardigan Bay	October 1954-April 1956
Captain John R.G. Trechman	HMS Eastbourne	June 1959-January 1961
Captain John C. Cartwright	HMS Plymouth	January 1961-February 1963
Captain Edward L. Cook	HMS Plymouth	February–April 1963
Captain Edward R. Anson	HMS Juno	December 1974-May 1976
Captain Charles E.T. Baker	HMS Cleopatra	May 1976-January 1977
Captain John M. Webster	HMS Cleopatra	January 1977-November 1978
Captain John M. Tait	HMS Cleopatra	November 1978-March 1981
Captain Hugo M. White	HMS Avenger	March 1981-August 1982
Captain A. Peter Woodhead	HMS Avenger	August 1982-September 1983
Captain A. Bruce Richardson	HMS Avenger	September 1983-March 1985
Captain Christopher J.S. Craig	HMS Avenger	March 1985-September 1986
Captain Ian D.G. Garnett	HMS Active	September 1986-February 1988
Captain A. James G. Miller	HMS Marlborough	1997-June 1999
Captain Anthony J. Rix	HMS Marlborough	June 1999-December 2000
Captain Duncan L. Potts	HMS Marlborough	December 2000-August 2002
Captain Mark Anderson	HMS Marlborough	August 2002 – 2004
