= Operation Allied Protector =

NATO anti-piracy military operation

- Part of Piracy in Somalia
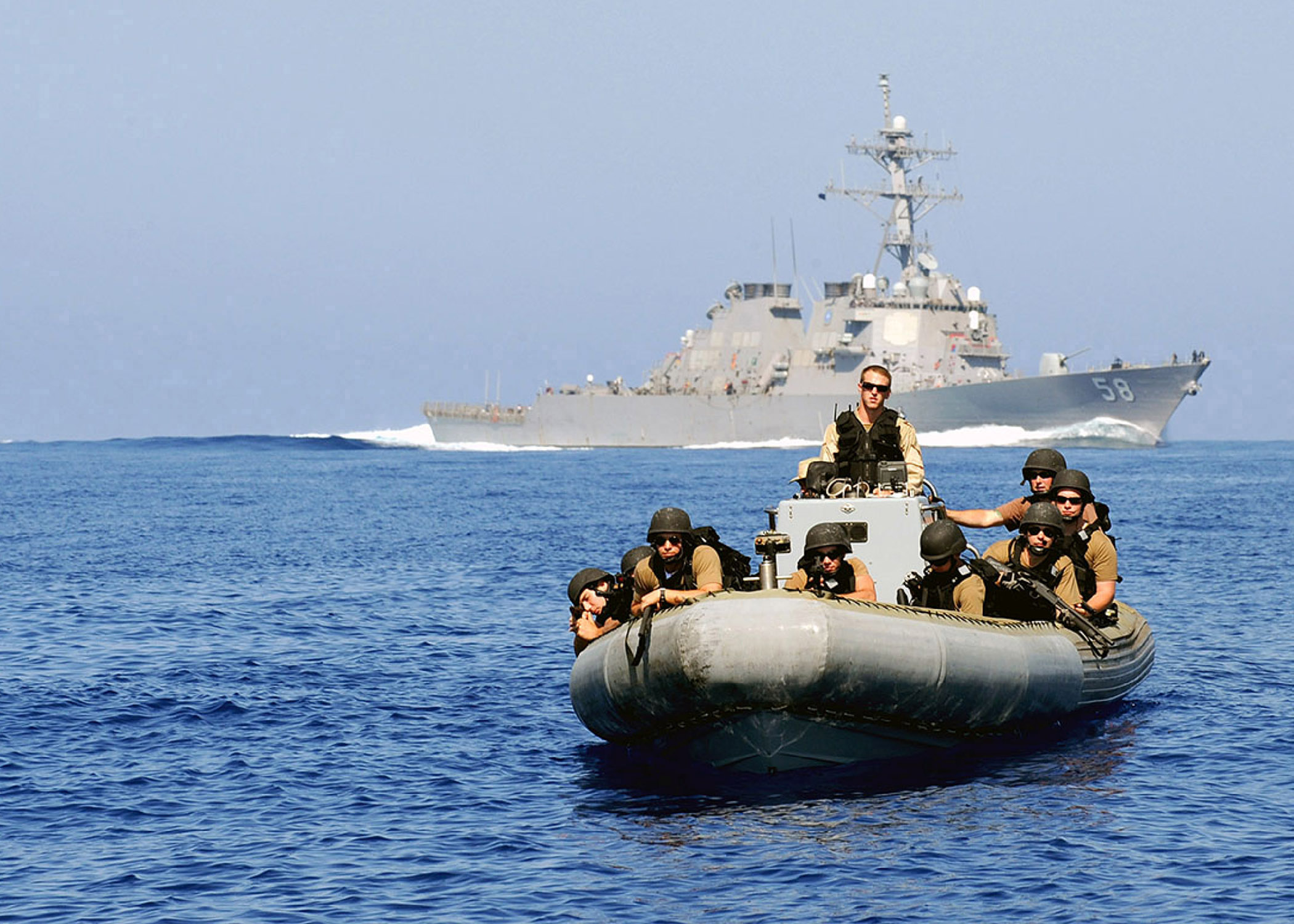
- A US Navy VBSS team from USS Laboon conducts training in preparation for Operation Allied Protector
Date	24 October 2008 – December 2008
Location	Gulf of Aden, Arabian Sea, Indian Ocean, Guardafui Channel
Result	Replaced with Operation Ocean Shield

Belligerents
NATO Active Participants: Canada; Italy; Germany; Greece; Turkey; Spain; Netherlands; Portugal; United Kingdom; United States	Pirates

Commanders and leaders
(Portugal) R. Adm. Jose Pereira de Cunha, Commander Standing NATO Maritime Group One (United Kingdom) Cdre Steve Chick, Commander Standing NATO Maritime Group Two	Unknown

Strength
5 ships, ~2 helicopters	Unknown

Operation Allied Protector was an anti-piracy military operation undertaken by NATO forces from March – August 2009 in the Gulf of Aden, the Indian Ocean, and the Guardafui Channel to protect maritime routes from pirates within the International Recommended Transit Corridor (IRTC). It was the second NATO anti-piracy operation in area following Operation Allied Provider and was succeeded by Operation Ocean Shield.

From 24 March – June 2009, the operation was conducted by Standing NATO Maritime Group One (SNMG1). Commander SNMG 1 had the task designator Commander Task Force 410 for the operation. This was the first time that SNMG1, which had previously operated in the Eastern Atlantic, was deployed operationally East of Suez. From 29 June – August 2009, Standing NATO Maritime Group 2 (SNMG2) took over responsibility from SNMG1.

== Background ==
Piracy off the coast of Somalia came to the forefront of NATO's attention when at the request of the United States Secretary-General on 25 September 2008, that NATO provide naval protection for vessels chartered by the UN's World Food Program based on UN Security Council Resolutions 1814, 1816, and 1838. On 21 October 2008, a letter was received by the United Nations from the Somali Transitional Federal Government authorizing NATO to enter Somali waters to protect World Food Program ships. Furthermore, they were authorized to perform counter-piracy operations in the region, including in Somali territorial waters. This led to the first NATO operation in the region, Operation Allied Provider which lasted 24 October to 13 December 2008. NATO operations were suspended when the European Union's Operation Atlanta began.

After an informal meeting among the defence ministers of NATO nations in Kraków, Poland, in February 2009 the North Atlantic Council (the managing council of NATO) met. At the same time the UN established the International Recommended Transit Corridor (IRTC), a route that would allow merchant ships to traverse the Gulf of Aden safely and be monitored by warships. The NAC decided that a new NATO operation off the coast of Somalia would take place in early 2009 and the mission was approved on 11 March 2009. The start date for the operation was decided on 24 March 2009. Standing NATO Maritime Group 1 (SNMG1), consisting of five NATO warships, was assigned to the operation.

== Operations ==
On 28 March 2009, USS Halyburton received a piracy emergency call from Grandezza, a 37-metre (121 ft) Maldivian-flagged yacht in the Gulf of Aden. The vessel reported that it was under machine gun and rocket-propelled grenade attack from at least one pirate skiff. Two Sikorsky SH-60 Seahawk helicopters were scrambled from Halyburton and disrupted the attack. Due to the distance from the incident, the pirates were able to retreat before NATO surface forces arrived. HNLMS De Zeven Provinciën later debriefed the crew of Grandezza and obtained statements and photographs from the attack.

On 18 April 2009, at approximately 3:00 pm local time, RFA Wave Knight stopped an attempted pirate attack of the Norwegian oil tanker MV Front Ardenne. Seven pirates were ultimately detained after a several hour pursuit involving HMCS Winnipeg, Halyburton, and Wave Knight. According to NATO, the suspects were "interrogated, disarmed,...[and] were set free according to national regulations." From 26–27 April 2009, SNMG1 made a port call in Karachi, Pakistan. Due to an increased amount of pirate activity, two other port visits in Singapore and Australia were cancelled. Furthermore, the end of SNMG1's participation in the operation was brought forward from June to May.

On 1 May 2009, NRP Corte-Real intervened in an attempted pirate attack of the Norwegian oil tanker MV Kition. The sole pirate skiff retreated to a dhow mothership, which was later intercepted by NATO surface forces. Eight Portuguese marines boarded the craft and detained 19 suspects and recovered several weapons, including several high-explosives. According to Côrte-Real's commander, this was the first time that such weapons were recovered from a pirate vessel. On 24 May 2009, Winnipeg boarded two pirate skiffs off the coast of Somalia, resulting in seizure of equipment, arms, and ammunition. Standing NATO Maritime Group 2 (SNMG2) took over from SNMG1 on 29 June 2009 and continued operations off the coast of Somalia until the end of Allied Protector on 17 August 2009, when the operation was superseded by the new NATO operation, Operation Ocean Shield which widened the scope of the mission.

== Deployed units ==
The following units were deployed in Operation Allied Protector:

=== Standing NATO Maritime Group One ===
Country	Vessel	Class	Type
Portugal	NRP Corte-Real	Vasco da Gama class	Frigate
Canada	HMCS Winnipeg	Halifax class	Frigate
Netherlands	HNLMS De Zeven Provinciën	De Zeven Provinciën class	Air defense and command frigate
Spain	Blas de Lezo	Álvaro de Bazán class	Frigate
United States	USS Halyburton	Oliver Hazard Perry class	Frigate

=== Standing NATO Maritime Group Two ===
Country	Vessel	Class	Type
Italy	Libeccio	Maestrale class	Frigate
Greece	Navarinon	Elli class	Frigate
Turkey	TCG Gediz	Oliver Hazard Perry class	Frigate
United Kingdom	HMS Cornwall	Type 22 Broadsword	Frigate
United States	USS Laboon	Arleigh Burke class	Destroyer
