= MV Iceberg 1 =

Ship built in 1976

History
- Name: MV Iceberg 1
- Owner: Azal Shipping
- Launched: 29 November 1975
- Identification: IMO number: 7429102
- Fate: Lies abandoned at 7°13'08"N 49°30'52"E
- Status: In custody of authorities of Puntland

General characteristics
- Type: Cargo ship, roll-on/roll-off
- Tonnage: 4,500 DWT

MV Iceberg 1 is a Panama-flagged roll-on/roll-off cargo ship that was hijacked by Somali pirates on March 29, 2010. It was the longest-held hijacked ship until the Puntland Maritime forces released it and 22 crew members on 23 December 2012.

== Vessel ==
The MV Iceberg 1 is a Panama-flagged roll-on/roll-off cargo vessel owned by Azal Shipping in Dubai with a deadweight of 4,500 tonnes.

== Hijacking and release ==
The MV Iceberg 1 was hijacked on March 29, 2010 about 10 nautical miles off the port of Aden, Yemen, outside the International Recommended Transit Corridor (IRTC). It was carrying a mixed cargo of general mechanical equipment owned by the multinational company Aggreko. The ship was heavily insured and was bound for Jebel Ali in the United Arab Emirates.

The vessel was originally carrying 25 crew members consisting of nationals from Yemen, India, Ghana, Sudan, Pakistan and the Philippines. One of the crew members, Wagdi Akram, committed suicide on 27 October 2010 by jumping overboard. The Azal Shipping company have told Wagdi Akram's family that reports of him being beaten and starved to death could have contributed to his death. Other crew members are suffering from mental problems. Unconfirmed reports also claim that the ship's chief engineer had been killed, allegedly by pirates, in March or June 2011.

On December 10, 2012, Puntland Maritime Police Force, including several boats, a sniper on land, and a helicopter, began bombarding the Iceberg 1. A backup team of pirates were shot dead by a team in the helicopter while attempting to board the ship. On December 22, the Police Force was able to board the ship and rescue the 22 surviving crew members after almost three years in captivity. They were taken to a hospital in Puntland for basic health checks, then flown home.

Five Indian survivors were invited to a two-day recovery workshop in Mumbai, directed by the Maritime Piracy Humanitarian Response Programme. It was reported that many of them were suffering from post-traumatic stress syndrome. The Indian government guaranteed survivors better-paying jobs in Indian waters. As of January 2013, none of the survivors have received any compensation from Azal Shipping. They received only half pay when the ship was at sea, and their paychecks were withheld entirely after the ship was hijacked.

== See also ==
- Piracy in Somalia
- List of ships attacked by Somali pirates in 2010
