= Sarim Burney =

Pakistani social activist and philanthropist

- Born: 17 December 1970 (age 55)
- Occupations: Social Activist, Philanthropist
- Known for: Founder of Sarim Burney Welfare Trust International
- Notable work: Advocacy for human rights, particularly for women and children

Sarim Burney is a Pakistani human rights activist and philanthropist, known as the founder of Sarim Burney Welfare Trust International, advocating for human rights, especially of women and children.

== Sarim Burney Welfare Trust International ==
In 1990, Burney founded Sarim Burney Welfare Trust International. The Trust has been at the forefront of addressing critical issues such as human trafficking while also supporting the rights of women and children, providing disaster relief, and legal aid. The Trust has provided tangible support, including financial assistance to persons with disabilities and programs to facilitate social integration.

== Notable work ==
Burney's work has been particularly notable in rescuing child camel jockey and establishing a database to document human rights abuses. The Trust has played an essential role in providing shelter and support to victims of exploitation. His global advocacy efforts have focused on defending the rights of prisoners, particularly those who have been wrongly accused and lack legal representation.

== Controversies ==
Sarim Burney faced a major controversy when he was arrested by the Federal Investigation Agency (FIA) in Karachi on charges of human trafficking. The arrest was made following a complaint by the US government. Burney was detained after arriving in Karachi from the United States.

== Personal life ==
Sarim Burney is the brother of Ansar Burney, another prominent philanthropist who also served as the caretaker Federal Minister for Human Rights in Pakistan in 2007 and 2008. However, differences have arisen between the Burney brothers, particularly over a televised exchange controversy in 2012.
