= Admiral Richardson =

Admiral Richardson may refer to:

- Bruce Richardson (Royal Navy officer) (born 1941), British Royal Navy rear admiral
- Charles Richardson (Royal Navy officer) (1769–1850), British Royal Navy vice admiral
- David C. Richardson (admiral) (1914–2015), U.S. Navy vice admiral
- James O. Richardson (1878–1974), U.S. Navy admiral
- John M. Richardson (admiral) (born 1960), U.S. Navy admiral
