= Bruce Richardson (Royal Navy officer) =

Rear-Admiral Bruce Richardson CB
- Born: September 1941 (age 85)
- Military career
- Allegiance: United Kingdom
- Branch: Royal Navy
- Service years: 1960–1992
- Rank: Rear-Admiral
- Commands: 4th Frigate Squadron; HMS Avenger
- Awards: Companion of the Order of the Bath

Rear-Admiral Alexander Bruce Richardson, CB (born September 1941) is a former Royal Navy officer who served as Flag Officer Sea Training from 1989 to 1991.

== Naval career ==
Richardson joined the Royal Navy in 1960. He became naval attaché in Moscow in 1982, commanding officer of the frigate HMS Avenger and commander of the 4th Frigate Squadron in September 1983 and Flag Officer Sea Training in December 1989. He went on to be Flag Officer, Surface Flotilla in September 1991 before retiring in April 1992.

Richardson was appointed a Companion of the Order of the Bath in the 1992 Birthday Honours.

== Later life ==
In retirement Richardson became chief harbourmaster for the Port of London Authority.

Military offices
Preceded by Roy Newman	Flag Officer Sea Training; 1989–1991	Succeeded by Michael Boyce
