= David Dobson =

British Royal Navy officer (born 1938)

Vice-Admiral Sir David Dobson KBE
- Born: 4 December 1938 (age 87)
- Military career
- Allegiance: United Kingdom
- Branch: Royal Navy
- Rank: Vice-Admiral
- Commands: HMS Amazon; HMS Southampton
- Awards: Knight Commander of the Order of the British Empire

Vice-Admiral Sir David Stuart Dobson KBE (born 4 December 1938) is a former Royal Navy officer who served as Naval Secretary.

== Naval career ==
Dobson was educated at the Royal Naval College, Dartmouth and, after joining the Royal Navy, became Commanding Officer of the frigate HMS Amazon in 1975. Promotion to captain followed on 30 June 1979. A naval aviator, he became naval and air attaché in Athens in 1979 and Senior Naval Officer on the Falkland Islands in 1982. He went on to be captain of the destroyer HMS Southampton in 1983 and then Captain of the Fleet and, following his promotion to rear admiral, became Naval Secretary in 1988. His last appointment was as Chief of Staff for the Allied Naval Force Southern Europe in the rank of vice admiral in 1991. He retired in 1991 and was President of the Union Jack Club.

== Family ==
In 1962 he married Joanna Mary Counter; they have two sons and one daughter.

Military offices
Preceded by Norman King	Naval Secretary; 1988–1990	Succeeded by Christopher Morgan
