= MV Beluga Nomination incident =

2011 conflict

- Part of Piracy in Somalia, Operation Ocean Shield, Operation Enduring Freedom - Horn of Africa
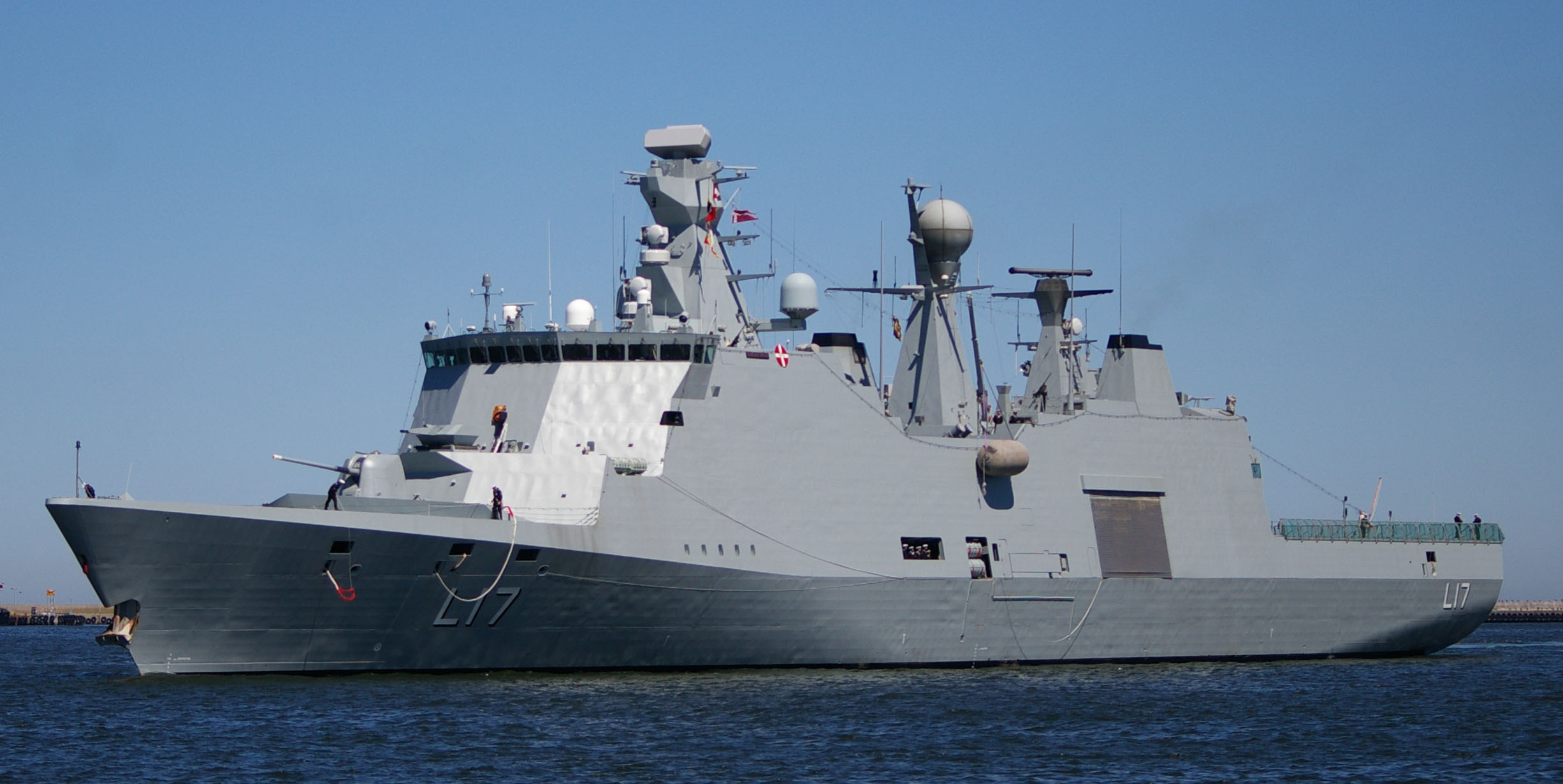
- HDMS Esbern Snare
Date	22–26 January 2011
Location	off Somalia, Indian Ocean
Result	Pirate victory, rescue attempt failed.: 2 civilians rescued

Belligerents
Denmark; Seychelles	Somali pirates

Strength
1 support ship (frigate); 1 patrol boat	2 freighters

Casualties and losses
Unknown	1–2 killed 1 freighter damaged
- 4 civilians killed

The MV Beluga Nomination incident was the capture and attempted liberation of a German freighter from Somali pirates by the Seychelles Coast Guard and Royal Danish Navy in the Indian Ocean in January 2011. A few days after the taking of MV Beluga Nomination, a Seychelles patrol boat and a Danish flexible support ship, HDMS Esbern Snare, encountered the pirates and engaged in a failed rescue operation.

== Incident ==
MV Beluga Nomination is a multipurpose heavy lift project carrier of Beluga Shipping and was on a commercial voyage from Malta to the South Korean port of Masan, stopping at the Point Victoria in the Seychelles during the passage through the Indian Ocean. Her crew consisted of twelve men with a Polish captain, two Ukrainian, two Russian and seven Filipino sailors. The incident began on 22 January when pirates in a single skiff, from the mother ship MV York, attacked Beluga Nomination while she was sailing approximately 435 miles (700 km) north of the Seychelles Islands. Automatic weapons fire erupted when the Somalis boarded the freighter, at which time the crew of twelve men sent out a distress call and entered the ship's citadel. The pirates were well armed and well prepared. A blowtorch was brought along and for several hours the Somalis welded their way into the citadel while sailing for the African mainland. The distress call was picked up by allied naval forces operating in the area on 22 January and the closest warship to the scene of Beluga Nomination's seizure was a Seychellois patrol boat, and the Danish command and support ship HDMS Esbern Snare.

Four days later on 26 January, the patrol boat was the first of the two allied ships to find Beluga Nomination, which was around 300 miles (480 km) off the Somali coast. A skirmish ensued as boarding parties attempted to retake the freighter while under cover from small naval guns and machine guns. The pirates used small arms and rocket-propelled grenades, and ultimately the Seychellois were repelled in their attempts at boarding though they killed one or two pirates. In the confusion, two of Beluga Nomination's crew, a Ukrainian and a Filipino, lowered a lifeboat and escaped by heading towards HDMS Esbern Snare. The two were picked up in healthy condition and they reported that the Somalis killed two of their shipmates and two others were missing and presumed dead after they jumped overboard. The German government issued a statement saying that the two hostages were either killed by the pirates or drowned at sea. When the Danish and the Seychellois realized they had failed the operation, they broke off the engagement and let the pirates go. No casualties were reported other than that of the pirates and the civilians. Beluga Nomination rendezvoused with York on the following day. Because of mechanical problems caused by battle damage, both ships then sailed for Somalia. In April the ship was finally released after her owners paid a large ransom.

== See also ==
- List of ships attacked by Somali pirates in 2011
