= HMS Amazon (F169) =

1974 Type 21 or Amazon-class frigate of the Royal Navy

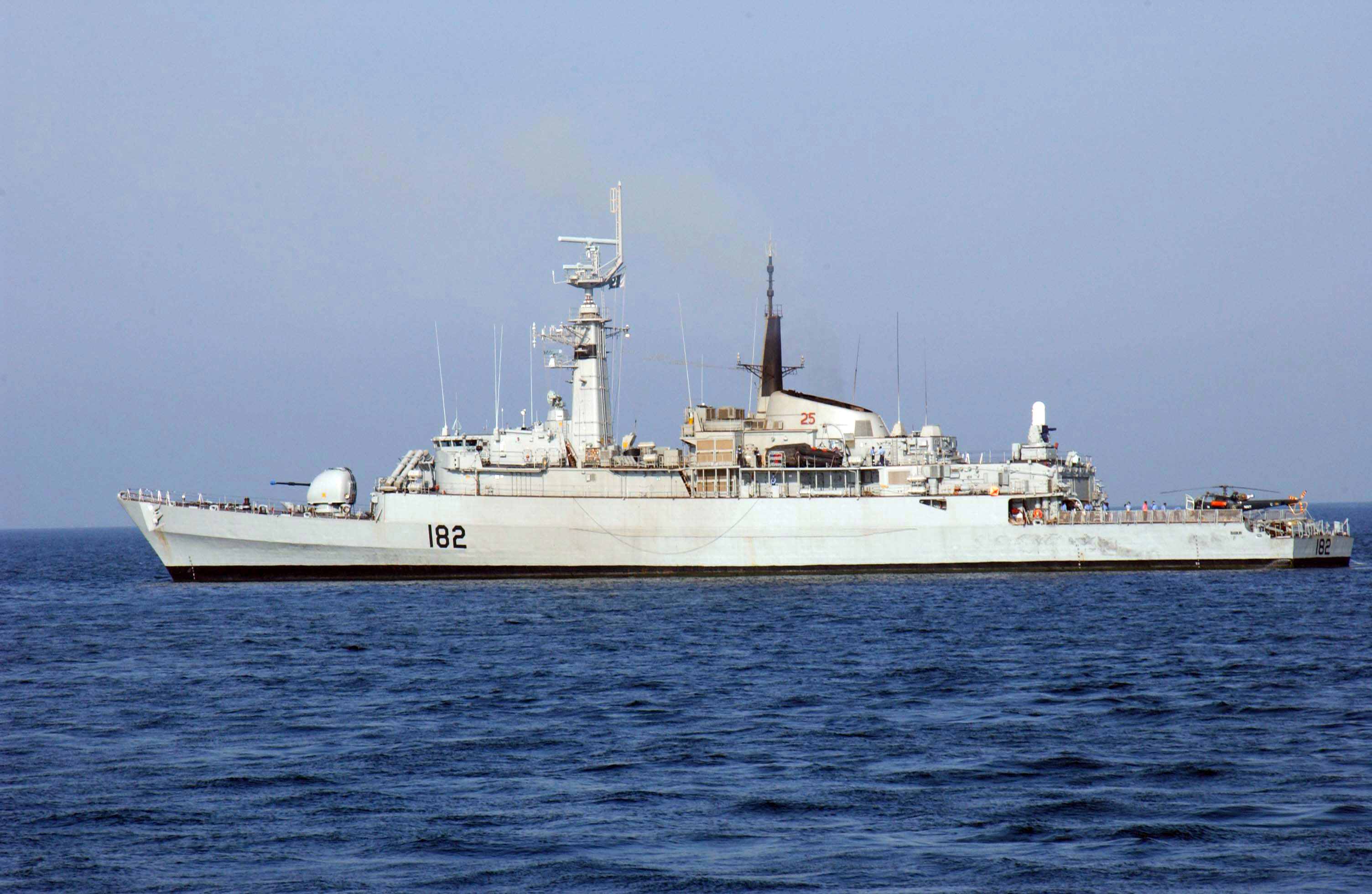
- PNS Babur (D182), former HMS Amazon, 2004

History

United Kingdom
- Name: HMS Amazon
- Operator: Royal Navy
- Builder: Vosper Thornycroft
- Laid down: 6 November 1969
- Launched: 26 April 1971
- Commissioned: 11 May 1974
- Decommissioned: 30 September 1993
- Identification: Pennant number: F169
- Motto: Audaciter (Latin: "boldly")
- Fate: Sold to Pakistan on 30 September 1993

Pakistan
- Name: PNS Babur
- Operator: Pakistan Navy
- Commissioned: 30 September 1993
- Decommissioned: 31 December 2014
- Status: Decommissioned

General characteristics
- Class & type: Type 21-class frigate
- Displacement: 3,250 tons full load
- Length: 384 ft (117 m)
- Beam: 41 ft 9 in (12.73 m)
- Draught: 19 ft 6 in (5.94 m)
- Propulsion: COGOG: 2 × Rolls-Royce Olympus gas turbines; 2 × Rolls-Royce Tyne RM1A gas turbines for cruising
- Speed: 32 knots (59 km/h; 37 mph)
- Range: 4,000 nautical miles at 17 knots (7,400 km at 31 km/h); 1,200 nautical miles at 30 knots (2,220 km at 56 km/h)
- Complement: 177
- Armament: RN: 1 × 4.5 inch (114 mm) Mark 8 naval gun; 2 × Oerlikon 20 mm cannon; 4 × MM38 Exocet missiles; 1 × quadruple Seacat missiles; 2 × triple ASW torpedo tubes; 2 × Corvus (radar countermeasure) launchers; 1 × Type 182 towed decoy; Pakistan: 1 × 4.5 inch (114 mm) Mark 8 naval gun; 2 × Oerlikon 20 mm cannon; 1 × Phalanx CIWS; 2 × 4-cell Harpoon SSM launchers; 2 × Mark 36 SRBOC chaff launchers; 1 × Type 182 towed decoy
- Aircraft carried: 1 × Westland Wasp helicopter, later refitted for 1 × Westland Lynx

HMS Amazon was the first Type 21-class frigate of the Royal Navy. Her keel was laid down at the Vosper Thornycroft shipyard in Southampton, England. The ship suffered a fire in the Far East in 1977, drawing attention to the risk of building warships with aluminium superstructure.

== Design ==
The Type 21 frigates were intended as a class of general purpose frigates to replace the diesel-powered frigates of the Leopard and Salisbury classes, and to maintain the Royal Navy's frigate numbers until the specialist anti-submarine ships of the Type 22 class could enter service. The contract for the design of the class was placed with the commercial shipbuilder Vosper Thornycroft, with the intent that the design would be cheaper than those produced by the Royal Navy's own design staff, while being attractive for export buyers.

Amazon was 384 feet (117.04 m) long overall and 360 feet (109.73 m) between perpendiculars, with a beam of 41 feet 9 inches (12.73 m) and a maximum draught of 19 feet (5.79 m). Design displacement was 2,750 long tons (2,790 t) normal and 3,250 long tons (3,300 t) full load. She was powered by two Rolls-Royce Olympus TM3B gas turbines rated at a total of 56,000 shaft horsepower (42,000 kW) and two Rolls-Royce Tynes rated at a total of 8,500 shaft horsepower (6,300 kW) in a Combined gas or gas (COGOG) arrangement, giving a speed of 30 knots (35 mph; 56 km/h) when powered by the Olympuses and 17 knots (20 mph; 31 km/h) when powered by the Tynes.

As built, armament consisted of a single 4.5 inch Mark 8 naval gun forward, and a four-round launcher for the Sea Cat surface-to-air missile aft, backed up by two 20mm cannon. A hangar and flight deck for a single light helicopter, intended to be the new Westland Lynx (although Amazon was first equipped with a Westland Wasp as the Lynx had not yet entered service). A Type 992Q surface/air search and target indication radar was fitted, together with a Type 978 navigation radar. Two Type 912 fire control radars (the Italian Selenia RTX-10X) directed the ship's gun and the Seacat, while a Type 184M medium range search sonar and a Type 162M bottom search sonar (modernised versions of the sonars used on the Leander-class) were fitted.

Later ships of the class completed with four Exocet anti-ship missiles forward, and two triple tubes for United States USN/NATO-standard Mark 44 or Mark 46 torpedoes, but Amazon did not receive Exocet until 1984–1985.

== Construction ==
Amazon, the first of her class, was ordered on 26 March 1969. She was laid down at Vosper Thornycroft's Woolston, Southampton shipyard on 6 November 1969 and was launched by Princess Anne on 26 April 1971. Construction was slow, and Amazon was not completed until 11 May 1974, at a cost of £16.8 million.

== Royal Navy Service ==
In June 1977 Amazon took part in the Fleet Review, of the Royal Navy at Spithead in celebration of HM the Queen's Silver Jubilee, while in July she carried out successful trials with the Lynx helicopter. In November 1977 Amazon suffered a serious engine room fire caused by a fuel leak when near Singapore. Ladders made of aluminium alloy melted in the fire, making it difficult to respond, which was one of the reasons why use of aluminum as a construction material for warships went out of fashion with the Royal Navy. From 1978 Amazon's Wasp helicopter was replaced by a Lynx.

In December 1980 the ship struck a coral pinnacle off Belize. Amazon was the only unit of her class to not participate in the Falklands War, as she was in the Persian Gulf at the time, although she carried out a patrol in the South Atlantic in August–November 1982.

By the mid-1980s the surviving Type 21s were suffering cracking in the hull and so she was taken in for refitting, with a steel plate being welded down each side of the ship. At the same time modifications were made to reduce hull noise. Four Exocet launchers were also fitted in 'B' position, the last of the class to be so fitted.

== Pakistan Navy Service ==
Amazon was decommissioned and sold to Pakistan on 30 September 1993, being renamed PNS Babur (D-182). Exocet was not transferred to Pakistan and Babur had her obsolete Sea Cat launcher removed. Two quadruple Harpoon missile launchers were fitted in place of the Exocet launchers. Signaal DA08 air search radar replaced the Type 992 and SRBOC chaff launchers and 20 mm and 30 mm guns were fitted.

On 3 August 2011, a video surfaced on the Internet reportedly showing Babur brushing against the Indian frigate Godavari in the Gulf of Aden during the rescue of hostages on-board merchant vessel MV Suez in June.

In December 2014, after serving 22 years of military service, Babur was retired and decommissioned.

== Commanding officers ==
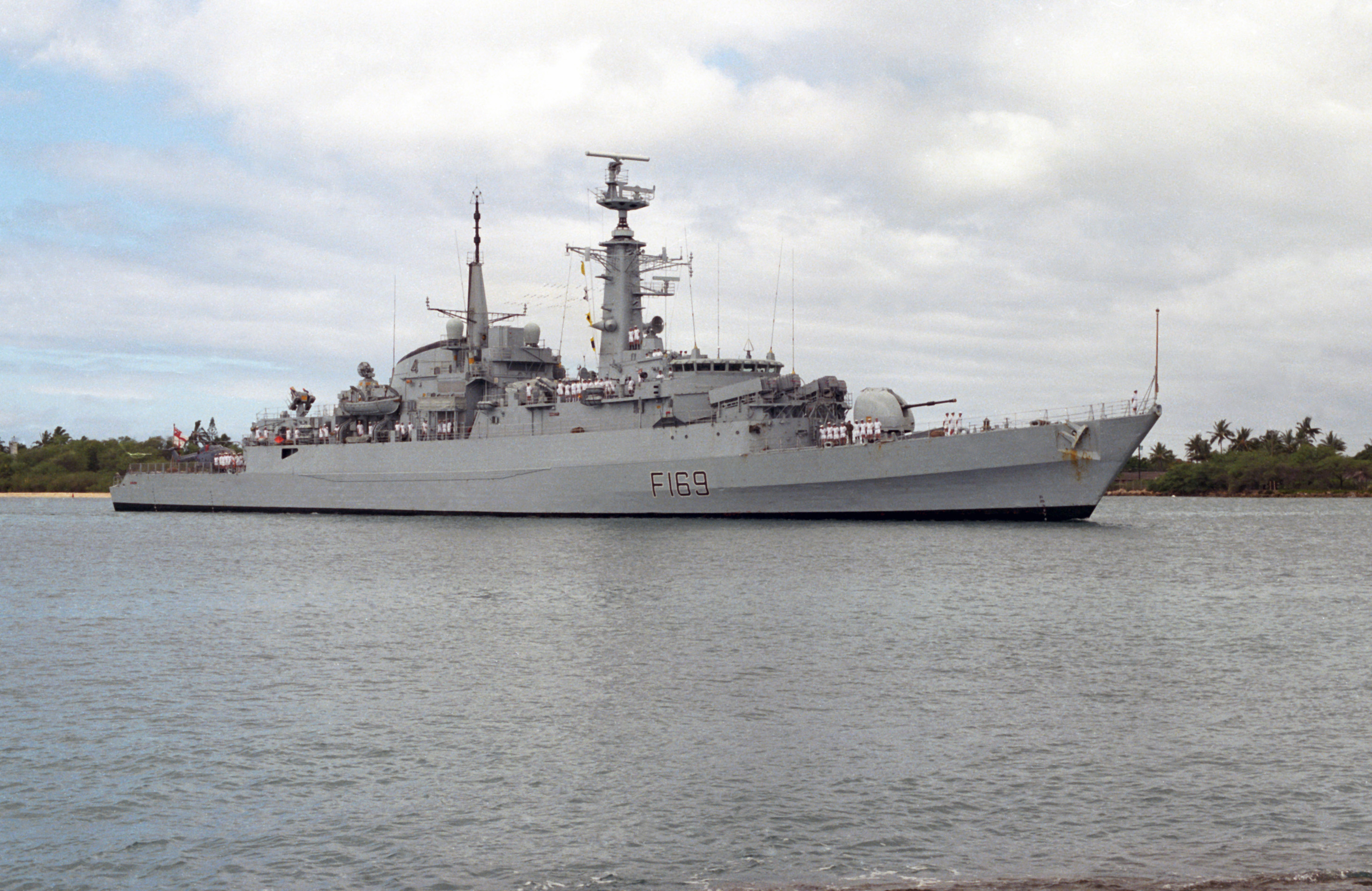
HMS Amazon during Exercise RIMPAC 86.

From	To	Captain
1973	1975	Commander W John Bingham OBE RN
1975	1977	Commander David Dobson RN
1977	1978	Commander A B Richardson RN
1978	1979	Commander R N Woodard RN
1980	1982	Commander Ian Garnett RN
1982	1984	Commander J E K Ellis RN
1986	1988	Commander R J Lippiett RN
1988	1990	Commander David A Lewis RN
1990	1992	Commander David J M Mowlam RN
1992	1993	Commander Patrick H Watson RN

== Publications ==
- Colledge, J. J.; Warlow, Ben (2006) [1969]. Ships of the Royal Navy: The Complete Record of All Fighting Ships of the Royal Navy from the 15th Century to the Present (3rd Rev ed.). London: Chatham Publishing. ISBN 978-1-86176-281-8. OCLC 67375475.
- Couhat, Jean Laybayle; Baker, A. D., eds. (1986). Combat Fleets of the World 1986/87: Their Ships, Aircraft and Armament. Annapolis, Maryland: Naval Institute Press. ISBN 0-85368-860-5.
- Critchley, Mike (1992). British Warships Since 1945: Part 5: Frigates. Liskeard, UK: Maritime Press. ISBN 0-907771-13-0.
- Friedman, Norman (2008). British Destroyers & Frigates: The Second World War and After. Barnsley, UK: Seaforth Publishing. ISBN 978-1-84832-015-4.
- Gardiner, Robert; Chumbley, Stephen, eds. (1995). Conway's All The World's Fighting Ships 1947–1995. Annapolis, Maryland, USA: Naval Institute Press. ISBN 1-55750-132-7.
- Marriott, Leo (1983). Royal Navy Frigates 1945–1983. Shepperton, Surrey, UK: Ian Allan Ltd. ISBN 0-7110-1322-5.
- Preston, Antony (2002). The World's Worst Warships. London: Conway Maritime Press. ISBN 0-85177-754-6.
- Sturtivant, Ray; Ballance, Theo (1994). The Squadrons of the Fleet Air Arm. Tonbridge, Kent, UK: Air Britain (Historians) Ltd. ISBN 0-85130-223-8.
