= PNS Babur (D-182) =

Tariq-class destroyer in the Pakistan Navy (1993-2015)

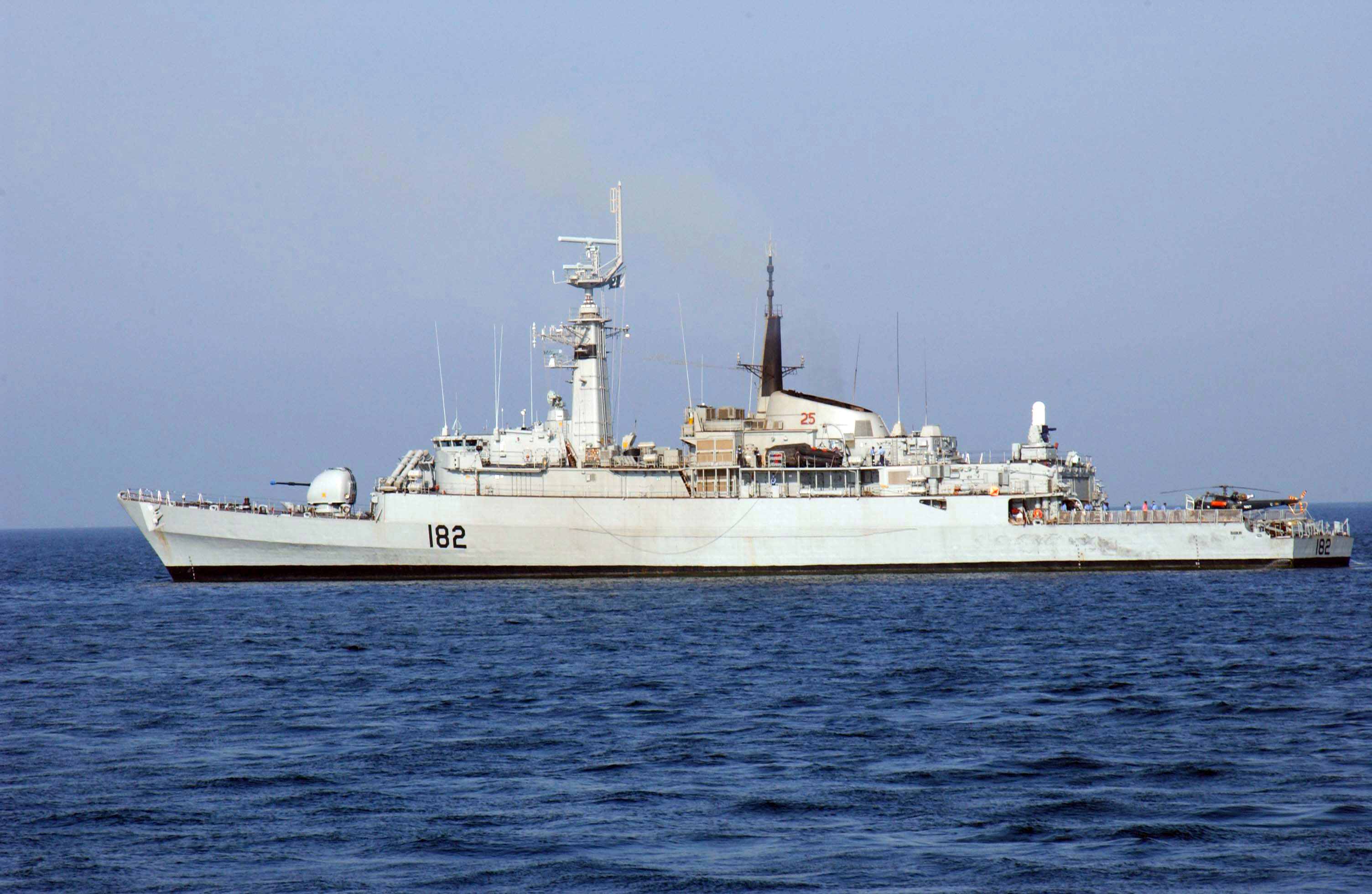
- PNS Babur (D-182) in the Persian Gulf in 2004.

History

Pakistan
- Name: PNS Babur
- Namesake: Babur
- Builder: Vosper Thornycroft in England
- Laid down: 6 November 1969
- Launched: 26 April 1971
- Acquired: 18 January 1994
- Recommissioned: 30 September 1993
- Decommissioned: December 2014
- In service: 1993–2014
- Out of service: 12 December 2014
- Home port: Naval Base Karachi
- Identification: Pennant number: D-182
- Fate: Scrapped

General characteristics
- Class & type: Tariq-class destroyer
- Displacement: 3,700 long tons (3,759 t) full load
- Length: 384 ft (117 m)
- Beam: 41 ft 9 in (12.73 m)
- Draught: 19 ft 6 in (5.94 m)
- Propulsion: COGOG: 2 × Rolls-Royce Olympus gas turbines; 2 × Rolls-Royce Tyne RM1A gas turbines for cruising
- Speed: 32 knots (59 km/h; 37 mph)
- Range: 4,000 nmi (7,400 km; 4,600 mi) at 17 knots (31 km/h; 20 mph)
- Complement: 192, 14 officers, 178 enlisted
- Armament: 1 × Vickers 4.5 in (114 mm)/55 Mk.8 AS/AA gun (25rds/min to 22 km/11.9nmi); 1 × Phalanx CIWS; 2 × 4-cell Mk 141 launchers (for Harpoon SSMs); 2 × 20 mm Oerlikon cannon
- Aircraft carried: 1 × Alouette III helicopter; 1 × Camcopter S-100 UAV
- Aviation facilities: Flight deck and hangar

PNS Babur (D-182) was a Tariq-class destroyer that served in the Surface Command of the Pakistan Navy from 1993 until being decommissioned in 2014. Before commissioning in the Pakistan Navy, she served in the Royal Navy, formerly designated as HMS Amazon as a general purpose frigate.

Upon being acquired by Pakistan in 1993, she went through a modernization and refitting program by the KSEW Ltd. at the Naval Base Karachi in 1998–2002 to be classified as destroyer.

== Service history ==
=== Acquisition, construction, modernization, and deployments ===
Designed and constructed by the Vosper Thornycroft in Southampton in England in 1969, she previously served in the Royal Navy as HMS Amazon as a "general purpose frigate", witnessing actions in the Iran–Iraq War in the 1980s.

During her service with the Royal Navy, she suffered an incident involving a fire in an engine room caused by a fuel leak, while docking in Singapore in 1977, drawing attention to the risk of building warships with aluminium superstructure.

After successful negotiations took place between Pakistan and the United Kingdom, she was procured in 1993, and reported to its base on 8 January 1994.

She was named after Babur, the founder of the Mughal Dynasty, which ruled the Indian subcontinent for nearly three centuries.

Upon reporting, she underwent an extensive modernization and mid-life upgrade program by the KSEW Ltd. at the Naval Base Karachi in 1998–2002.

The Royal Navy refrained from transferring the Exocet and Seacat missile systems to Pakistan, instead Pakistan installed the LY-60 in place of Exocet system. Her electronic system had the Signaal DA08 air search radar replaced with the Type 992 and SRBOC chaff launchers, and 20 mm and 30 mm guns were fitted. Her wartime deployment included her actions in the Arabian Sea and Indian Ocean.

On 3 August 2011, she was reportedly deployed in support of PNS Zulfiquar, the F-22P-class frigate, to conduct a cross-border rescue operation in the Somali coast but was involved in an incident when her commander advertently brushed against the Indian Navy frigate Godavari in the Gulf of Aden, causing strain in the bilateral relations between two nations.

A video surfaced on the Internet reportedly showing Babur taking measures that brushed off against the Indian Navy frigate Godavari, causing material damage to Godavari.

It was reported by the Indian news station, NDTV, "the helicopter net of Godavari was reportedly damaged from Babur's maneuvering."

After serving with 22 years of military service, Babur was reportedly retired and decommissioned from service in December 2014.

== Gallery ==
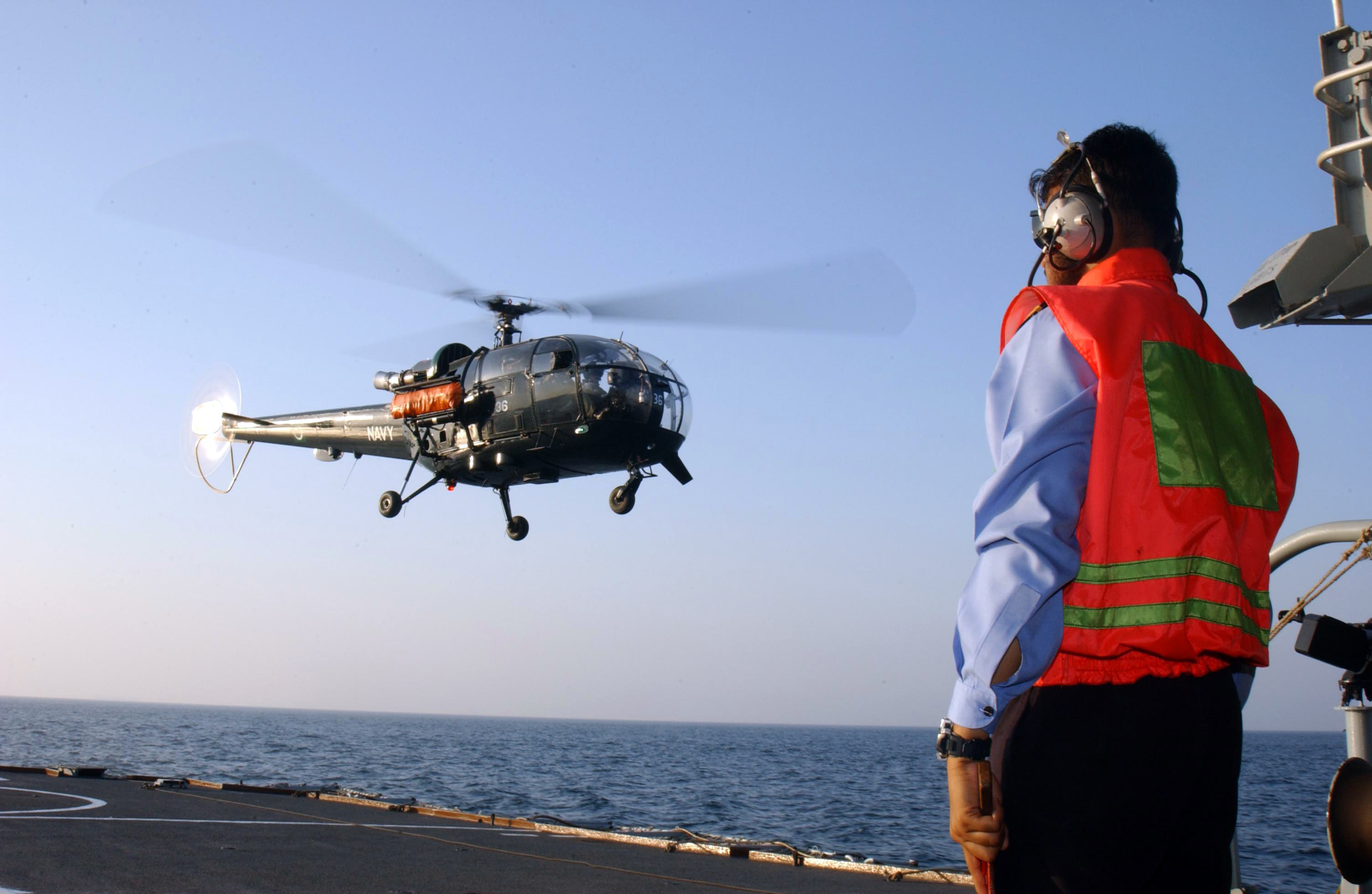
The Pakistan Navy's Alouette III launched during the Coalition Maritime Campaign in the Persian Gulf in 2004.

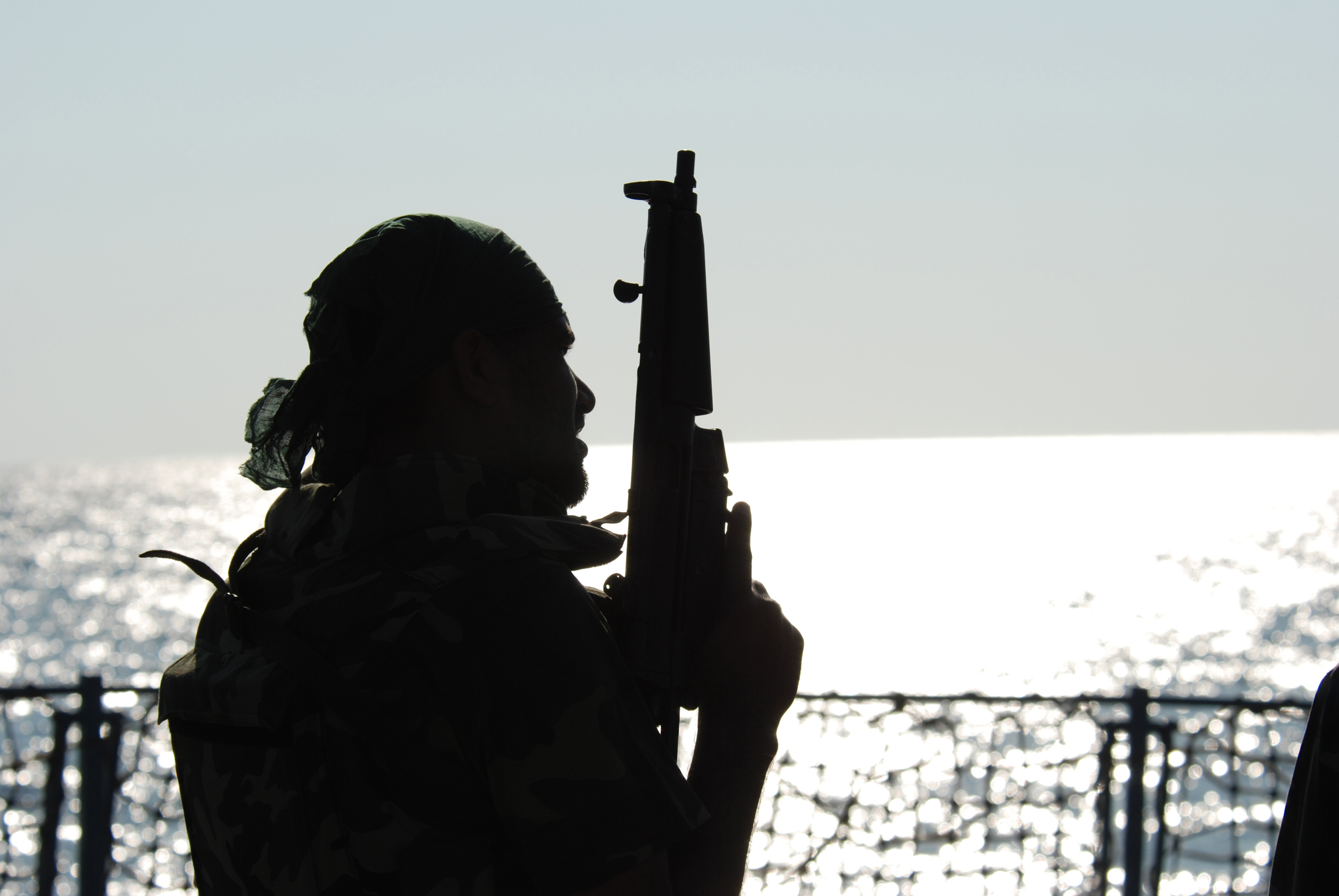
The Pakistan Navy SSGN abroad on PNS Babur with the CTF-151 in Arabian Sea in 2007.

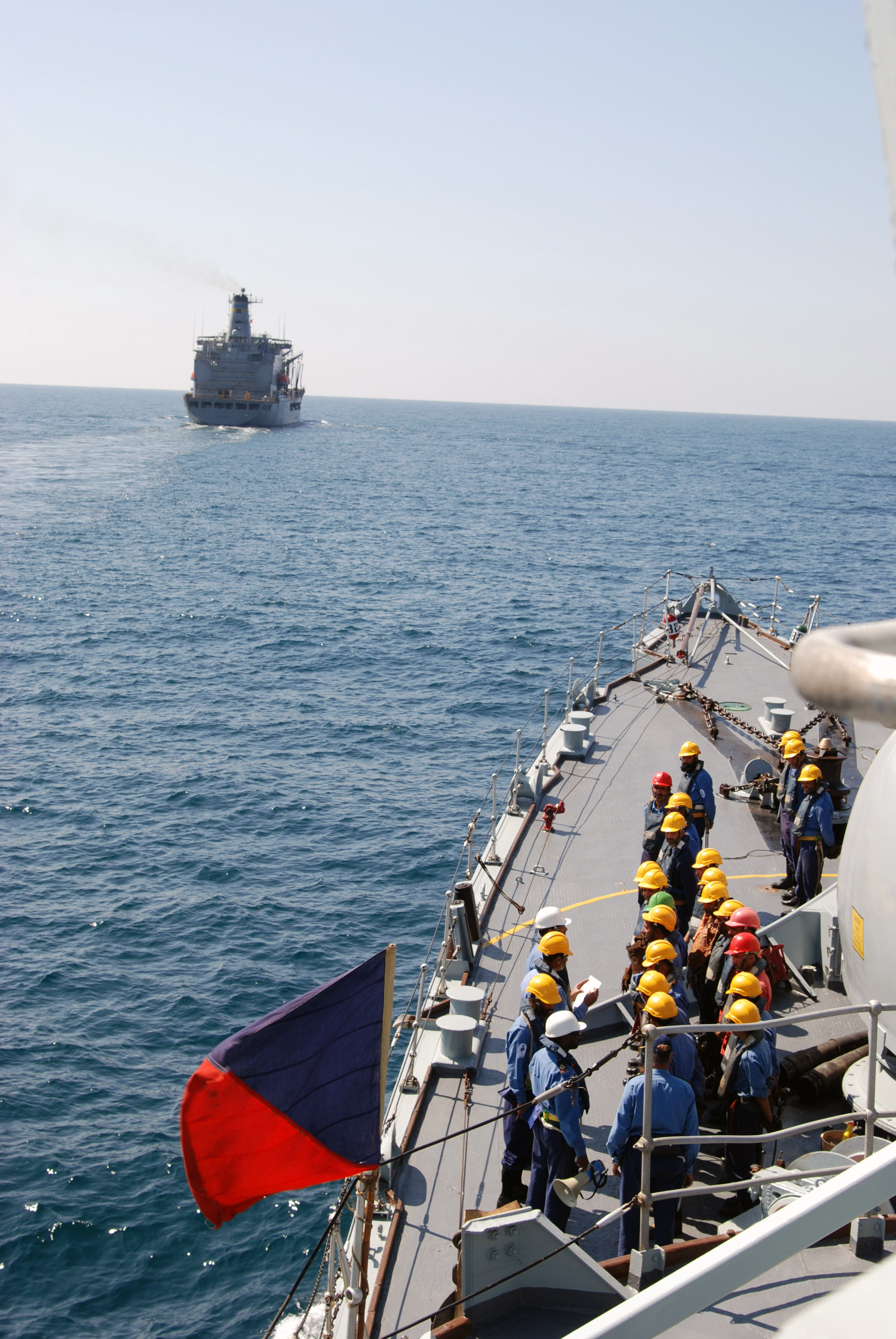
Sailors on board Babur prepare for an underway replenishment with the US Military Sealift Command vessel, USNS John Lenthall in the Arabian Sea in 2007.

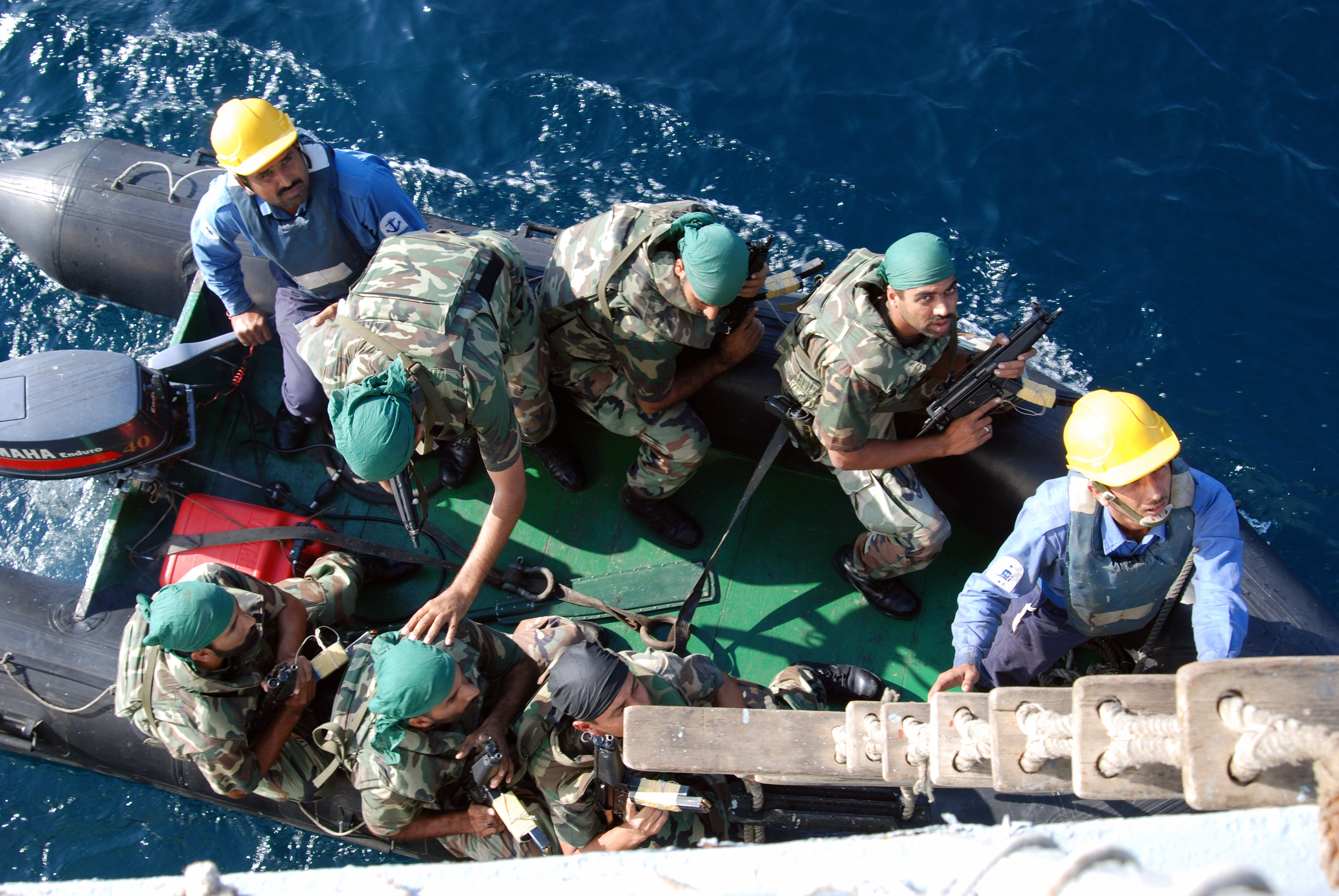
A Pakistan Navy SSGN team preparing for a mock assault from Babur in Arabian Sea in 2007.

== See also ==
- 2011 India–Pakistan border shooting
  - Operation Hope of Noah
- List of active Pakistan Navy Ships

== Media files ==
- "Naval battle... PNS Babur against INS Godavari". Indian Navy. 16 October 2014.
- "Celebrations on Pak warship after it hit INS Godavari". NDTV. NDTV. NDTV. 4 August 2011.
