= Ian Garnett =

Retired Royal Navy Admiral (born 1944)

Admiral Sir Ian Garnett KCB
- Born: 27 September 1944 (age 82); Surrey, England
- Military career
- Allegiance: United Kingdom
- Branch: Royal Navy
- Service years: 1962–2004
- Rank: Admiral
- Commands: Chief of Joint Operations; Deputy Supreme Allied Commander Atlantic; Naval Air Command; 4th Frigate Squadron; HMS Active; HMS Amazon
- Conflicts: Falklands War
- Awards: Knight Commander of the Order of the Bath; Legion of Merit (United States)

Admiral Sir Ian David Graham Garnett, KCB (born 27 September 1944) is a retired Royal Navy officer. He served as the Commandant of the Royal College of Defence Studies from 2005 to 2008.

== Naval career ==
Born in Surrey, Garnett joined the Royal Navy in 1962. He served in HM Ships London, Beachampton and the Royal Yacht Britannia. Later he joined 814 Naval Air Squadron on board HMS Hermes. He then served on exchange with the Royal Australian Navy on board HMAS Melbourne before flying Sea King helicopters in HM Ships Tiger and Blake and then became Operations Officer in HMS Naiad.

In 1978 Garnett became the deputy director (RN) of the Joint Maritime Operations Training School and then took command of HMS Amazon, a Type 21 Frigate. In 1983 he became assistant director (Ships) in the Operational Requirements Division of the Ministry of Defence. He went on to be Commanding Officer of the frigate HMS Active as well as Captain of the 4th Frigate Squadron in 1986, and then moved on to lead the Royal Navy Presentation Team from 1988.

In 1989 Garnett became Captain Naval Operational Command Systems and then Director of Operational Requirements (Sea Systems). In 1993 he was made Flag Officer, Naval Air Command and in 1995 he became Deputy Supreme Allied Commander Atlantic for NATO.

In February 1999 Garnett was appointed Chief of Joint Operations at the Permanent Joint Headquarters and in September 2001 he became Chief of Staff at Supreme Headquarters Allied Powers Europe.

== Post-navy career ==
Garnett retired from the Royal Navy in December 2004, and from 5 January 2005 until 4 January 2008 was Commandant of the Royal College of Defence Studies. He was appointed Chairman of Chatham Historic Dockyard in 2005. He is currently chairman of the Royal Navy Club of 1765 & 1785 (United 1889). He is currently President of the Type 21 Club Association of RN Amazon Class Frigates 1971 – 1994.

Military offices
| Preceded by Sir Peter Abbott | Deputy Supreme Allied Commander Atlantic; 1995–1998 | Succeeded by Sir James Perowne |
| Preceded by Sir Christopher Wallace | Chief of Joint Operations; 1999–2001 | Succeeded by Sir John Reith |
| Preceded by Sir Christopher Wallace | Commandant of the Royal College of Defence Studies; 2005–2008 | Succeeded by Charles Style |
