= HMS Avenger (F185) =

Type 21 or Amazon-class frigate of the Royal Navy and Pakistan Navy

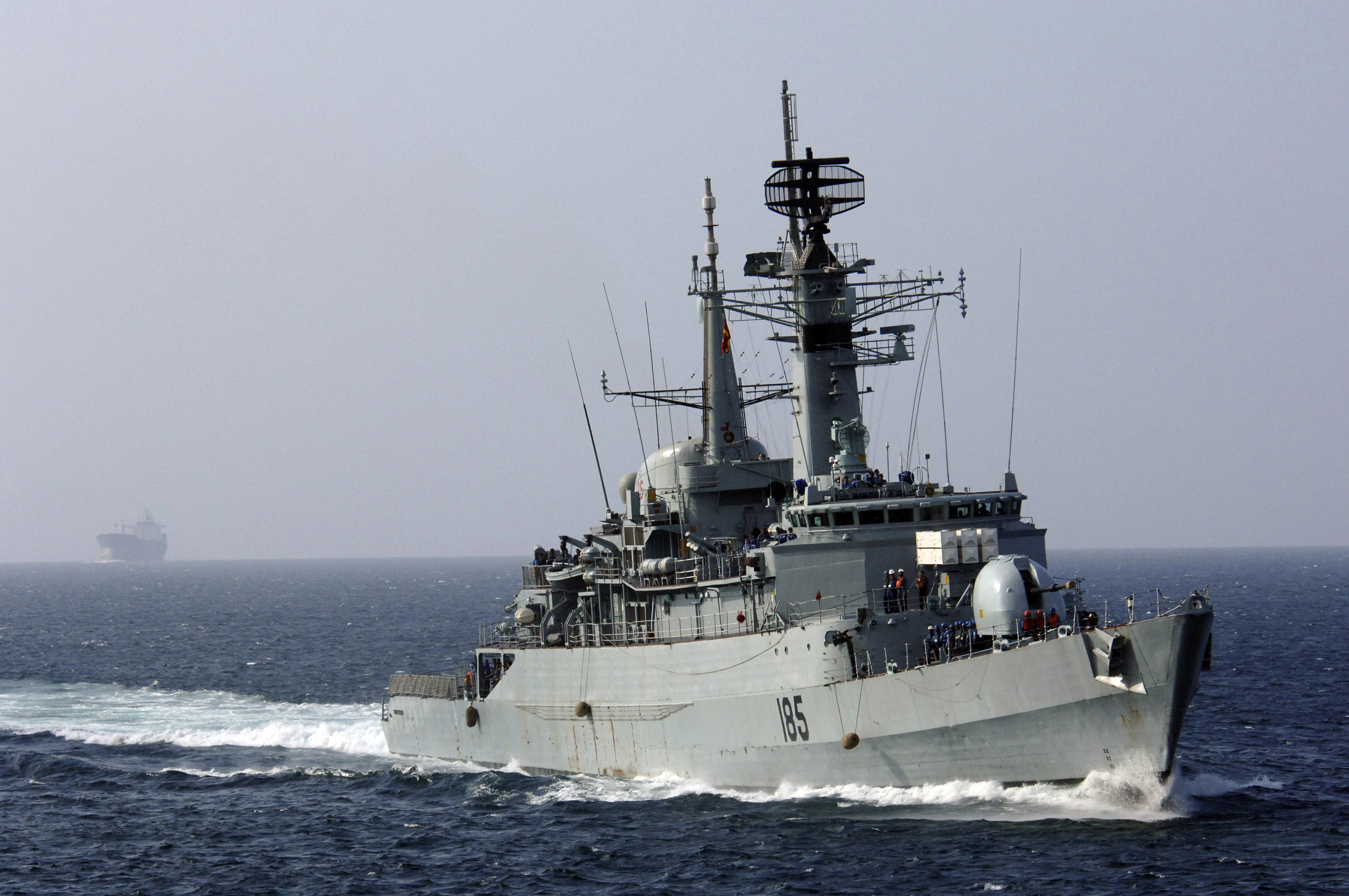
- PNS Tippu Sultan, former HMS Avenger

History

United Kingdom
- Name: HMS Avenger
- Builder: Yarrow Shipbuilders
- Laid down: 30 October 1974
- Launched: 20 November 1975
- Commissioned: 15 April 1978
- Decommissioned: 23 September 1994
- Home port: HMNB Devonport
- Identification: Pennant number: F185
- Honours and awards: Falkland Islands 1982
- Fate: Sold to Pakistan on 23 September 1994

Pakistan
- Name: PNS Tippu Sultan
- Acquired: 23 September 1994
- Identification: Pennant number: D185
- Fate: Expended as a target 27 April 2020

General characteristics
- Class & type: Type 21 frigate
- Displacement: 3,250 tons full load
- Length: 384 ft (117 m)
- Beam: 41 ft 9 in (12.73 m)
- Draught: 19 ft 6 in (5.94 m)
- Propulsion: COGOG: 2 × Rolls-Royce Olympus gas turbines; 2 × Rolls-Royce Tyne RM1A gas turbines for cruising
- Speed: 32 knots (59 km/h; 37 mph) official, 37 knots achievable on bursts
- Range: 4,000 nmi (7,400 km; 4,600 mi) at 17 knots (31 km/h; 20 mph)
- Complement: 177
- Armament: Royal Navy: 1 × 4.5 inch Mark 8 (113 mm); 4 × Oerlikon 20 mm cannon; 4 × MM38 Exocet missiles; 1 × quadruple Sea Cat surface-air-missiles; 2 × triple ASW torpedo tubes; 2 × Corvus chaff launchers; 1 × Type 182 towed decoy; Pakistan Navy: 1 × 4.5 inch Mark 8 (113 mm) gun; 2 × Oerlikon 20 mm cannon; 1 × Phalanx CIWS; 1 × 6-cell LY-60N Hunting Eagle SAM launcher; 2 × Mark 36 SRBOC chaff launchers
- Aircraft carried: 1 × Westland Wasp helicopter, later refitted for 1 × Alouette III and 1 × Westland Lynx

HMS Avenger was a Type 21 frigate of the Royal Navy. Built by Yarrow Shipbuilders Ltd, Glasgow, Scotland, she was completed with Exocet launchers in 'B' position.

== Royal Navy service ==
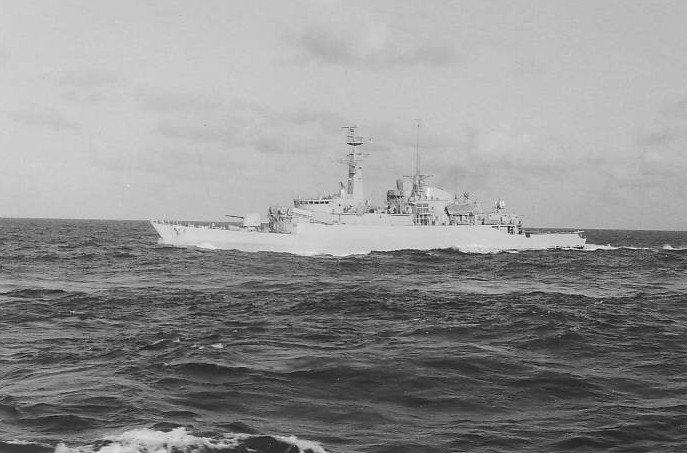
En route to the Falklands with the Bristol Group

In 1981, following the appointment of Captain Hugo White, Avenger became leader of the 4th Frigate Squadron. She was a late arrival to the Falklands War, departing the United Kingdom on 10 May 1982 and arriving on 25 May. This was the fastest transit achieved by any vessel involved in the conflict, covering the distance in 14 days. The Rolls-Royce Olympus turbines fitted to Type 21 frigates enabled them to maintain high speeds, although this capability was not widely publicised at the time. Avenger averaged 28 knots, and the Type 21 class subsequently became informally known as the "Boy Racers".

During the campaign Captain White commanded Avenger, which on 30 May 1982 survived an Exocet missile attack aimed at the carrier HMS Invincible (R05). Her divers recovered a 20 mm Oerlikon gun from the wreck of HMS Antelope, which was remounted to augment her anti-aircraft capability and became known on board as "Antelope's Avenger". On 11 June she provided naval gunfire support around Port Stanley. During this action she struck a house being used as a civilian shelter, resulting in the deaths of three Falkland Islander women and injuries to several others. They were the only British civilian casualties of the Falklands War.

During the Falklands deployment, an alarming crack in the ship's hull progressively worsened with the stormy South Atlantic weather. On return to UK, she was taken in for refitting, with a steel plate being welded down each side of the ship to eliminate the problem. At the same time modifications were made to reduce hull noise.

On 4 May 1983, HMS Avenger, and sister ship HMS Ambuscade, were on the Royal Navy 'Armilla' patrol, a permanent presence in the Persian Gulf during the 1980s and 1990s. The Avenger's commanding officer, Captain Peter Woodhead, was returning from a visit ashore in the ships Westland Lynx, (registration XZ249) when it suffered a tail rotor control failure and, nose down, plunged into the sea off Muscat, Oman. The Lynx helicopter never resurfaced from its entry into the sea and for a short time there was no sign of the aircrew or ship's captain. As HMS Avenger approached the crash sight the crew observed some green clothed bodies breaking the surface on the water. When it was suggested to the Captain that a Westland Lynx helicopter from the Royal Army of Oman would be taking him and the other three crew members to the nearest hospital in Oman, he informed the medics "there is no fucking way I am getting into that helicopter". Captain Woodhead and the three other crew members survived the incident, with Woodhead sustaining a non-life changing injury to his back.

After the war she remained leader of the 4th Frigate Squadron until 1986.

== Pakistan Navy service ==
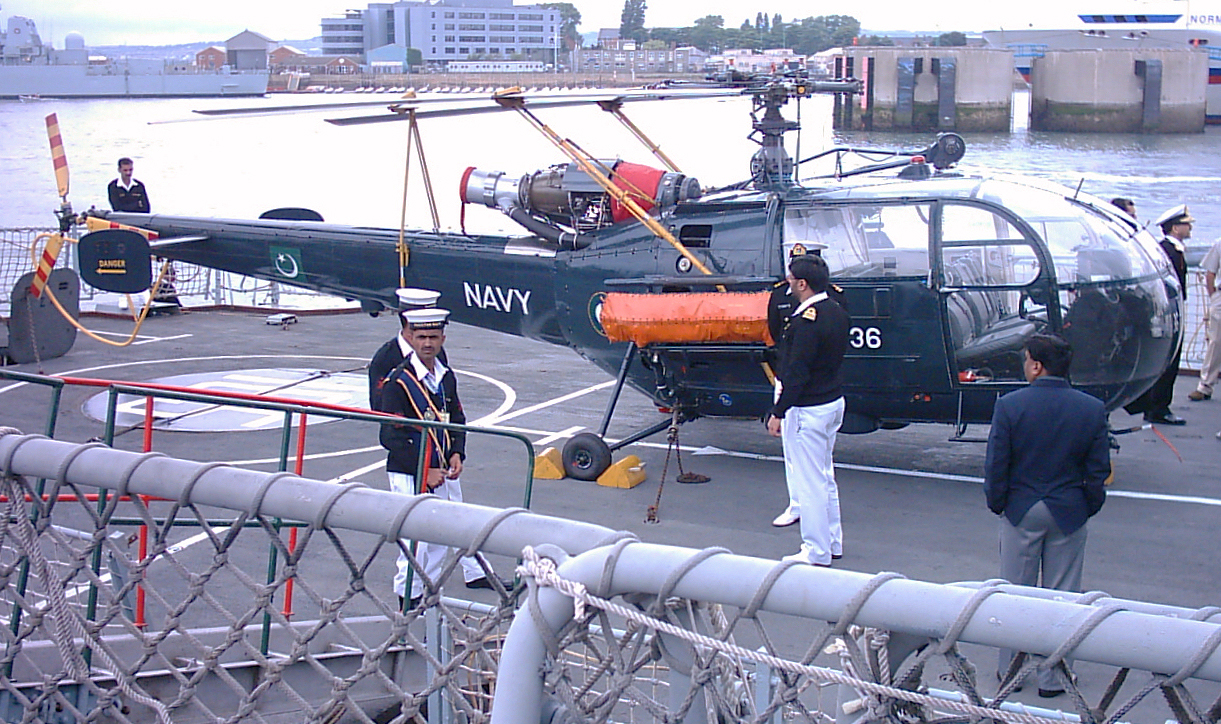
Pakistan Naval Air Arm Alouette III on board Tippu Sultan at Portsmouth in 2005

Avenger was decommissioned and sold to Pakistan on 23 September 1994, where she was refitted and renamed Tippu Sultan. She was the third ship to carry this name and remained in service with the Pakistan Navy as part of the 25th Destroyer Squadron until on 27 April 2020 she was expended as a target.

== Publications ==
- Colledge, J. J.; Warlow, Ben (2006) [1969]. Ships of the Royal Navy: The Complete Record of All Fighting Ships of the Royal Navy from the 15th Century to the Present (3rd Rev ed.). London: Chatham Publishing. ISBN 978-1-86176-281-8. OCLC 67375475.
- Marriott, Leo, 1983. Royal Navy Frigates 1945-1983, Ian Allan Ltd, Surrey. ISBN 978-0-7110-1322-3
