= MV York =

Liquefied gas tanker ship

History
- Name: York
- Owner: York Maritime Co., Greece
- Operator: Bernhard Schulte Ship Management, Germany
- Port of registry: Singapore
- Builder: Higaki Shipbuilding
- Launched: 27 March 2000
- Identification: Callsign: 9VED8; IMO number: 9220421; MMSI number: 565525000
- Notes: Captured by Somali pirates in October 2010 and used as mothership for piracy operations (January 2011) Released by the pirates in March 2011.

General characteristics
- Tonnage: 5,076 DWT
- Length: 101 m (331 ft 4 in)
- Beam: 20 m (65 ft 7 in)
- Draft: 5.8 m (19 ft 0 in)
- Crew: 17 (October 2010)

MV York is a tanker for transport of liquefied gas that after its 2010 capture by Somali pirates had become a mothership for pirate operations. The vessel was released on March 10, 2011, after an unknown amount of ransom had been paid.

== Piracy target ==
On its way from Mombasa, Kenya, to Mahé, Seychelles, the vessel was captured by Somali pirates about 205 miles off the coast of Kenya on 23 October 2010. It is possible that the FV Golden Wave 305, a pirate-seized South Korean fishing boat that allegedly had been fishing illegally off the Somali coast, was used in the capture of the MV York. That the York entered service as a mothership for pirate operations was suspected in December 2010, and confirmed in January 2011, when the York was used by pirates to assist taking control of the captured MV Beluga Nomination in the Indian Ocean. The Beluga had run out of its fuel (using apparently the day tank) and was unable to move. Several hours later the York appeared and assisted the captured ship so that the Beluga could resume its course towards Somalia.

== Piracy mothership ==
The York became part of a fleet of captured merchant vessels that have been called "Large Pirate Support Vessels" (LPSVs) and been considered "game-changing" in view of the increased operational capabilities. Previously dhows and fishing boats had been used as motherships. This new strategy of using merchant vessels was initiated with the pirate-seized MV Izumi in the fall of 2010. The use of merchant vessels enlarges the range of operations, increases transit speed, allows more pirates and skiffs to be taken along, provides better accommodations, gives access to radar and navigational technology, and reduces dependency on sea and weather conditions. Using a larger ship, the pirates can attack a ship of equal size and apply heavier weapons from a more stable firing platform. The presence of hostages on such ships poses a problem for naval forces out to protect shipping lanes. The size of the ship, however, makes it easier to detect them and avoid them.

By the end of 2010 four other merchant vessels were used as pirate motherships, namely the chemical tanker MV Hannibal II, the tanker MV Polar, the chemical tanker MT Motivator, and the MV Izumi.
