= Operation Umeed-e-Nuh =

Naval humanitarian and rescue operation by Pakistan Navy

Operation Umeed-e-Nuh (Operation New Hope)
- Part of Piracy in Somalia, Operation Ocean Shield, and Somali Pirates attacks on merchant ships
- Location: Arabian Sea
- Planned: Pakistan Navy
- Planned by: Special Services Group Navy; Naval Intelligence
- Objective: Provide humanitarian assistance to MV Suez evacuation of the crew
- Date: 16–19 June 2011; 13:13 PST – 15:10 PST
- Executed by: PNS Babur; PNS Zulfiqar
- Outcome: Pakistani Operation successful
- Casualties: None; None killed None injured

Operation Umeed-e-Nuh (Operation New Hope), was a naval humanitarian and a rescue operation in order to secure the merchant vessel MV Suez. The operation was carried out by the Pakistan Navy. The merchant vessel MV Suez operated under the flag of Panama and had an Egyptian owner, Red Sea Navigation. On 2 August 2010, the vessel was attacked and taken hostage by Somali pirates. Pakistani human rights activist Ansar Burney and Governor of Sindh, Dr Ishrat-ul-Ibad Khan managed to secure the release of the 22 men crew with a payout of US$2.1 million. The pirates released the vessel on 16 June 2011. However, multiple issues involving low fuel and deteriorated operational and material meant that the crew needed additional help from the Pakistan Navy.

Upon receiving request for help by the commanding officer Captain Syed Wasi Hassan, the Pakistan Navy dispatched its combatant frigates and naval helicopters to escort the merchant vessel to safety. On 13 June 2011, naval frigate PNS Babur successfully evacuated and later shifted the crew members to safety on PNS Zulfiqar. The crew members, consisting of 4 Pakistanis, 6 Indians, 11 Egyptians and one Sri Lankan, were successfully brought to land at the port city of Karachi.

== Background ==
MV Suez was a merchant vessel carrying a cargo of cement bags from Karachi, Pakistan to Eritrea. The vessel displayed the Panamanian flag and was owned by the Egyptian maritime company, Red Sea Navigation Company, of Port Tawfiq. The ship had a 22-member crew with 11 Egyptians, 6 Indians, 4 Pakistanis and a Sri Lankan, including and under the command of Captain Syed Wasi Hassan. The merchant vessel had a 17,000 tons deadweight (DWT).

=== Capture of MV Suez ===
On 2 August 2010, as the merchant vessel sailed through the Internationally Recommended Transit Corridor (IRTC) in the Gulf of Aden, it came under attack from small arms fire by Somali pirates. This particular route in the Gulf of Aden is renowned for its pirate-infested waters. Following initial reports, a combat helicopter from EU Naval Force Somalia was dispatched towards the ship. The pirates had already taken over the command of the vessel once the helicopter reached its vicinity. The pirates demanded a ransom for US$ 20 million for the release of the crew members.

=== Raising the money for sailors' release ===
The Red Sea Navigation company were asked to pay the ransom for the release of its employed sailors, but the company could only manage US$1 million. In desperation, the pirates allowed crew members of other nationalities to contact their respective governments in order to pay for their ransom. The Egyptians, Indians and Pakistanis held three meetings in Dubai from March to May 2011 in order to discuss a plan the strategy for the release of the vessel and the crew on board.

The Egyptian president of the ship's operating firm, Abdel Meguid Matar, was joined by Indian (Chandigarh-based) Alchemist Group's chairman and managing director and Rajya Sabha Member Kanwar Deep Singh. The Pakistani diplomats were renowned human rights activist and former Federal Minister for Human Rights Ansar Burney and Governor of Sindh Dr Ishrat-ul-Ibad Khan.

Burney was effective in trying to negotiate with the pirates and the Red Sea Navigation company. He managed to lowered the ransom amount from the initial US$20 million to US$2.1 million. In the meantime, he asked the Pakistani public to donate the rest of the amount through a charity appeal under his trust, Ansar Burney Trust International. Through his charity appeal, Burney was able to raise around US$1.1 million from all over Pakistan. Along with Burney, Governor Ibad also played a vital role in the release of the captives.

Burney flew to Egypt on 24 May 2011 in order to meet Abdel Maguid Matar. Burney was vocal about the atrocities being committed by the pirates on the captives. He also mentioned to the operators that the balance of the ransom amount had been raised and that the pirates had given a 10-day deadline for the payout.

Burney had shown concern that the Governor would be needed if a naval escort was to be provided for the vessel in open sea. On 3 August 2010, Burney and the Red Sea Navigation company were ready to pay the ransom for the sailors' release. By the time the vessel was released on 13 June 2011, it was in a "deteriorating operational and material state" and was low on fuel.

=== Preparing for a naval rescue mission ===
Governor Ibad's presence on the team meant that help could be acquired from the Pakistan Navy if need arose. He had also participated in preparatory discussions of a naval operation to secure the release of the captives with Chief of Naval Staff Admiral Noman Bashir.

It was reported that the vessel was attacked again by pirates as it sped to safety. Upon request of Captain Wasi Hassan for assistance, Governor Ibad requested Admiral Bashir for an operation to be commenced.

== Engagement ==
On 16 June, PNS Babur was dispatched on the course of action, under a mission codename Operation Ummed-e-Nuh. The operation was completed and executed successfully in two stages. The Navy had dispatched teams of SSGN, medical teams along with medical supplies and food provisions on PNS Babur.

During stage-I, the vessel was again attacked by the pirates to hijack the vessel. At 15:10 PST, the captain of vessel reported that the freed ship was sinking due to rough weather. The captain of MV Suez appealed to the Ministry of Foreign Affairs and the Chief of Naval Staff seeking immediate help in view of their vessel being caught in strong winds feared capsizing since its release with 22-member crew of board by the Somalian pirates and series of misfortunes latest among them the breakdown of the tug towing MV Suez.

The Egyptian operator of the vessel and captain had decided to abandon the ship since its electrical system went down. During Stage-2 of the operation, Admiral Noman Bashir ordered PNS Babur to make arrangements to save the lives of the crew. At 13:13 PST, the Navy reported that the crew had been shifted to PNS Babur. The crew was then planned transferred onboard another Pakistan Navy frigate PNS Zulfiqar for onward passage to Pakistan, and eventually reached Karachi.

== Indo-Pak diplomatic row ==
On16 June 2011, Pakistani naval frigate PNS Babur and Indian naval frigate INS Godavari became the centre point of a diplomatic row between the two nations. Pakistan protested saying that the Indian frigate brushed past the Pakistani frigate that had come to the assistance of crew members on board the sinking MV Suez. Pakistan described the Indian ship as taking "dangerous manoeuvers", however India later denied the incident saying it was Pakistan that was "jeopardising the safety [of their mission]". Pakistani officials said that whilst the rescue operation was under-way, the Indian naval ship arrived in the vicinity of the disabled MV Suez and tried to hamper the efforts of the PN ship that had come along for humanitarian assistance.

The issue gained a serious note when Indian officials claimed that Godavari tried contacting the "master" of the ship to offer support but was declined. Pakistan and India exchanged angry charges over the incident allegedly involving Babur and Godavari. Godvari was later pulled off and the Indian Ministry of External Affairs called the naval attaché of the Pakistan Embassy where the Indian government lodged a formal protest over this incident.

== Aftermath ==
Before the crew members of the ill-fated MV Suez surfaced on land at Karachi, Burney said he wanted this gesture to be a "gift to India from the Burney trust" and that he loved both the countries, India and Pakistan, equally. Burney's attempts at trying to negotiate the response of the captives on board MV Suez has led him to be praised throughout India. Families of the Indian victims at the Delhi airport held posters saying "Thank You, Burney Uncle".

It also became clear how the owner of the ship abandoned all efforts to save it as sailor Ravinder mentioned in an earlier interview before boarding PNS Babur. "We have not been sent any help from our owner. The ship is in danger of sinking which is why we have decided to abandon it," he said

=== Criticism of Indian response ===
The Indian media criticised the Indian Navy for not acting quickly enough when the freed MV Suez was attacked again by pirates. NDTV, an Indian news channel, reported that the captain of MV Suez did not respond to Godavari; however, this was dismissed later by one of the sailors on board saying that the Indian vessel never responded to their pleas. This was reported by NDTV in such a way that it seemed the merchant vessel gave the Indian navy a cold shoulder. The Indian sailors made clear that it was in fact only PNS Babur that responded to them.

Furthermore, the owners of the ship had told NDTV that they had approached the Indian government for help. In an email to NDTV, a senior company official said, "I've contacted the (Indian) Navy, but there's no response. I have called them so many times." He says Indian officials advised him to "call the NATO hotline and ask if they have any warships in this area for escort."
