= MV Izumi =

History
- Name: MV Izumi
- Owner: NYK-Hinode Line Ltd., Japan
- Operator: Fair Field Shipping KK, United States
- Port of registry: Panama
- Launched: 1 June 2007
- Completed: 2007
- Identification: Callsign: 3EMF4; IMO number: 9414955; MMSI number: 354717000
- Status: Captured by Somali pirates in October 2010, and used as mothership for piracy operations.

General characteristics
- Tonnage: 20,170 GT
- Length: 147 m (482 ft)
- Beam: 25 m (82 ft)
- Draft: 5.6 m (18 ft)
- Crew: 20 (October 2010)

The MV Izumi is a multi-purpose, RoLo (roll-on lift-off) merchant vessel. After its capture by Somali pirates it was used as the first captured merchant vessel in a novel mothership role for pirate operations that expands the pirates' operational capabilities.

Transporting steel and on its way from Japan to Mombasa, Kenya, the vessel was intercepted and captured by Somali pirates in Somali waters on October 10, 2010. It was brought to Xamdule (Hamdule) between Hobyo and Harardheere. The crew, all Filipino nationals although the government of the Philippines had prohibited the use of their nationals in pirate waters, was made hostage.

Thereafter, with hostages as a human shield the pirates used the Izumi as a mothership in attacks on other vessels, first on the tanker MV Torm Kansas near Pemba Island, and then, on November 6, 2010, in an attack on the EU NAVFOR Spanish warship Infanta Christina and her escort object, the AMISOM-chartered merchant vessel Petra 1 heading for Mogadishu. During the night action, the warship moved between Izumi and Petra to protect its escort and used only "minimal force" to deter the pirates out of concern for the hostages. The pirate ship could leave unharmed.

Izumi has become the first vessel of a fleet of captured merchant vessels that have been called "Large Pirate Support Vessels" (LPSVs) and been considered "game-changing"; previously pirates had used only dhows and fishing boats as motherships. This new strategy of using merchant vessels presents an escalation in the war against pirates. The use of merchant vessels enlarges the range of operations, increases transit speed, allows more pirates and skiffs to be taken along, provides better accommodations, gives access to radar and navigational technology, and reduces dependency on sea and weather conditions. Using a larger ship, the pirates can attack ships of equal size and apply heavier weapons from a more stable firing platform; skiffs would still be used to board the victim vessel. The presence of hostages on such ships poses a problem for naval forces, as their superior firepower cannot be effectively applied. The size of the captured merchant ships, however, makes it easier to detect them and avoid them.

By the end of 2010 four other merchant vessels had been enrolled as pirate motherships, namely the LPG tanker MV York, the chemical tanker MV Hannibal II, the tanker MV Polar, and the chemical tanker MT Motivator.
