= Ansar Burney =

Pakistani human and civil rights activist

SI HI Ansar Burney
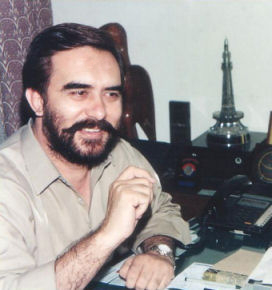
- Ansar Burney
- Born: 14 August 1956 (age 70); Karachi, Sindh, Pakistan
- Citizenship: (Pakistan) Pakistani
- Education: University of Karachi
- Occupation: Senior lawyer/human rights activist
- Known for: Human rights activism
- Spouse: Shaheen Burney
- Children: Fahad Burney; Raheel Burney; Sana Burney
- Awards: More than 250 awards.See list
- Honours: Sitara-e-Imtiaz; Hilal-e-Imtiaz; Anti-Human Trafficking Hero by the US State Department
- Website: www.ansarburney.org

Ansar Burney (Urdu: انصار برنی; born 14 August 1956) is a Pakistani human and civil rights activist and a former Federal Minister for Human Rights in Pakistan’s caretaker cabinet from 2007 to 2008. He graduated with a master's in law from Karachi University. He is widely credited as a leading human rights activist in Pakistan since 1980.

== Early life ==
Burney was born on 16 August 1956 in Karachi, Pakistan. He is the son of Syed Mukhtar Ahmed Burney. He graduated with a Master's of Law degree from Karachi University. His ancestors migrated from western Uttar Pradesh to Pakistan.

Burney was a prominent student leader with the People's Student Federation in his youth, during the 1970s, and was known to speak out for justice, human dignity, and civil rights. His efforts in the movement landed him in trouble with the military government of the time, and in 1977, at age 20, he was arrested on charges of delivering pro-democracy speeches against martial law and was sentenced to eight months rigorous imprisonment by the Martial Law Court. On his release in 1978, the martial law authorities once again arrested him and sentenced him to prison for a further two months. In 1979, Burney was arrested for a third time and detained for a month.

During his detention in different Pakistani prisons, Burney witnessed, firsthand, the deplorable conditions and met numerous prisoners who had been imprisoned having committed no crime nor having been charged. Some had been in detention for over 40 years without ever appearing in court.

On his release, and the completion of his law degree in 1980, Burney set up the Prisoners Aid Society, Commission Against Terrorism and the Bureau of Missing and Kidnapped Children in Karachi (Pakistan). He eventually formed Ansar Burney Trust International with offices in Karachi, Islamabad, Peshawar, Mirpur, Quetta, Washington D.C., and London.

The Ansar Burney Trust is a non-governmental, non-political, and nonprofit organisation which initially worked for the release of illegally and unlawfully detained prisoners, the welfare of prisoners, reforms in prisons and mental asylums, and to raise a voice against corruption and to trace missing and kidnapped children. However, it later widened its scope to cover all areas of human & civil rights and worked against human trafficking worldwide.

== Positions held ==
=== Chairman: Ansar Burney Trust International ===
Established initially in 1980 as the Prisoners Aid Society, Commission Against Terrorism and the Bureau of Missing and Kidnapped Children by Ansar Burney in the Pakistani port city of Karachi, the Ansar Burney Trust International (as it is now known) was the first Pakistani organization to fight for the concept of human rights in Pakistan.

With a mission to work as a non-political, non-governmental, and non-profitable organization, it started its fight against all forms of injustices, cruel inhuman and degrading treatment, child abuse, cruelty to women, and other more subtle forms of human and civil rights violations without any discrimination or affiliation.

The Trust is a network of human rights organisations and volunteers working to deliver justice, better treatment of human beings, and for the rights and freedoms of civil liberty. It works to raise awareness, provide free legal advice. and services and humanitarian assistance where needed.

It has been involved in bringing reforms to police stations, prisons, and mental institutions, and worked for the aid, advice, release, rehabilitation, and welfare of illegally and unlawfully detained prisoners and mental patients. It also works for the rehabilitation and welfare of the families of these victims on humanitarian grounds in the greater interest of justice and humanity without any affiliation or consideration for any political party, group or activity.

The Trust has made steady progress in achieving its objectives and has started a number of centers for various projects in Pakistan and abroad. It also publishes newsletters and human rights reports to spread awareness of issues and to encourage more people to become involved.

=== Federal Minister for Human Rights (Pakistan) ===
On 16 November 2007, Ansar Burney was sworn in as Pakistan's caretaker federal minister for the newly established Human Rights ministry. He was in charge of establishing the ministry, creating a national commission on human rights, and overseeing the general elections in Pakistan.

During his term as a federal minister, Burney visited 25 prisons and mental asylums throughout Pakistan, resulting in the release of several hundred innocent persons including children as young as seven. He also pushed for further reforms to prisons, government-controlled orphanages, and shelter homes for women.

== Expert advisor to the United Nations Human Rights Council ==
On 27 March 2008, Ansar Burney was elected unopposed for a term of three years as a member of the United Nations Human Rights Council Advisory Committee and due to "his recognized experience in the field of human rights and acknowledged competence and impartiality, Burney received wide support from all regional groups of the Council."

== Humanitarian activities ==
=== Prominent cases ===
Burney has been involved in the release of thousands of prisoners from prisons across the world. The following are some of the most prominent cases he had been involved in during his initial years as the head of the Prisoners Aid Society.

==== Syed Muzaffar Ali Shah ====
In 1985, Syed Muzaffar Ali Shah visited a police station to lodge a burglary report. He had been arrested under the Lunacy Act 37 years earlier. He was detained without ever being charged or presented before a court. He was finally released after the efforts of the Prisoners Aid Society.

==== Mehar Din ====
Arrested by police at age 20 on charges of murder because he had the same name as the person they were looking for, Meher Din spent the next four years behind bars until he was acquitted. Rather than being released, he was re-arrested on another murder charge and spent the next seventeen years behind bars without ever appearing in court. He was eventually transferred to a mental asylum within a prison and had no contact with his family for 21 years. He was released in 1987 after he was discovered by Burney of the Prisoners Aid Society.

==== Mukhtar ====
Mukhtar was arrested in an attempted murder case in 1952 in Kohat and was sentenced to seven years hard labour. After a year and a half in the D. I. Khan Jail, he was sent to the Peshawar Jail, where he remained for the next 18 years without being charged with any crime. In 1970, when someone noticed his continued incarceration, he was released but was rearrested in Karachi where he remained until 1987 when he was discovered by Ansar Burney who took this matter to the Sindh High Court, and he was finally released. Mukhtar had spent a total of 35 years in jail.

==== Mohammed Akhtar ====
A female prisoner was sent to prison in 1946, where she was raped and gave birth to Mohammed Akhter in 1948. The mother then died when Akhter was five years old. With no one to claim him, he spent 40 years in the prison, never leaving its premises. He was spotted by Ansar Burney during a visit to the prison and released in 1988.

==== Woman imprisoned for 55 years ====
A girl, whose name was never known, was arrested in 1936 at age 15 for upsetting the British Viceroy at the time. Without any charge or ever being presented before a court, she remained in prison for 55 years, becoming deaf and mute. She was released in 1991 at age 70 only after she was discovered by Burney who took up her situation with Sindh Governor, Justice (ret'd) Fakhruddin G. Ebrahim, who ordered her immediate release.

==== Ghulam Fatima ====
A witness to the murder of her husband during the Muslim-Hindu riots of 1947, Ghulam Fatima lost her mental balance and was arrested by the police for loitering and sent to Lahore Mental Prison where she remained for 45 years. She was discovered by Burney during a trip to the asylum and released in 1992.

== Lobbying against death penalty in Pakistan ==
Burney has appealed to both the Pakistani Supreme Court and various presidents of Pakistan to commute the death sentence of all condemned prisoners to life imprisonment as a human rights lawyer and expert on the Pakistani legal system for many years

Investigations by Burney and his organisation have uncovered that many condemned to death in Pakistan are in fact either innocent victims of false testimonies or circumstances, and are now mentally and physically disabled due to their decades-long confinement in harsh and inhumane conditions within Pakistani prisons.

In 2012, as a direct result of Burney's petitions, former President of Pakistan Asif Ali Zardari instructed various branches of the Pakistani government to provide advice on the possibility of converting all death sentences in Pakistan into life imprisonment. The president stayed or postponed executions for two years.

However, following the 2014 Peshawar school massacre, Pakistan lifted its moratorium on death penalty. The moratorium was not put in place as a result of Burney's actions, although he might have affected that earlier decision.

== Campaign against human trafficking, false imprisonment and slavery ==
Ansar Burney is an internationally recognised campaigner against human trafficking and slavery, and has been working against such practices in Pakistan, the Middle East, and Africa for decades. During that time, with assistance from various governments and authorities, his Trust has secured the release of thousands of people from false imprisonment and slavery across the world, including young girls sold in the sex trade and young children used for slavery. In 2005, the Trust was involved in the release and repatriation of 13,967 victims from the Middle East alone. The Government of the United States Department of State declared Burney as International Anti Human Trafficking HERO in 2005.

=== Prominent cases ===
==== Child camel jockeys ====
Burney is particularly credited as the man whose efforts led to the end of child slavery in the form of child camel jockeys in the Middle East, resulting in thousands of children being freed and returned to their homes in South Asia and Africa.

Beginning his campaign against child trafficking two decades earlier, Burney had been involved in raising awareness of the issue of child camel jockeys for many years and had been involved in the rescue and repatriation of many children from the Gulf region. During 2003–04 in the UAE alone, as per reports by the Bureau of Democracy, Human Rights, and Labor at the US State Department, Burney had managed to rescue and repatriate over 400 children.

By 2005, the use of child camel jockeys was banned in the UAE, and in other neighbouring Gulf nations the year after, and in recognition the Ansar Burney Trust was declared an international best practice by the US State Department in its 2005 Trafficking in Persons Report. The report stated:

A noted Pakistani human rights activist, Ansar Burney has worked relentlessly to bring to light the plight of thousands of South Asian and African children trafficked to Arab countries in the Persian Gulf for exploitation as camel jockeys. These abused children, some as young as two years of age, are purposely malnourished (to keep them lightweight) and denied education. As a result of Mr. Burney's efforts, the Government of the United Arab Emirates (U.A.E.) established its first-ever shelter for rescued child camel jockeys, and rescued 68 such children and repatriated 43 through the shelter. Mr. Burney oversees this shelter. He is quick to point out, however, that much more needs to be done to rescue, rehabilitate, and repatriate thousands of trafficked children throughout the Gulf region.

Burney continues on his mission to end any such existing practices across the Middle East. A documentary on his work rescuing child camel jockeys that aired on the American TV channel HBO won both an Emmy Award and an Alfred DuPont Award.

==== Killings of 7 immigrants in Macedonia ====
Six Pakistani immigrants and an Indian immigrant attempting to cross illegally into Europe were arrested by Macedonian authorities in March 2002. According to Macedonian police, a plan was hatched and the men were taken to a remote spot in Macedonia where they were murdered and framed as terrorists in an attempt to prove Macedonia's credentials as a frontline US ally in the war on terror. At the time, it was stated by the Macedonian authorities that the men had travelled from Pakistan in an attempt to attack the embassy and the plan had been foiled by the actions of the Macedonian police. Macedonian police accused then Interior Minister Ljube Boškoski of ordering the killings. Burney campaigned on behalf of the victims' families, raising money for the families, and calling for repatriation of the victims' bodies.

==== Pakistani Taekwondo players falsely accused of terrorism ====
Ten Pakistani taekwondo players, who were representing their country in games being held in Latvia, were arrested in 2003 on terrorism charges. The players' families contacted Burney who in turn contacted the Latvian authorities to seek the men's release. After an investigation, it was revealed that the players' only crime was that they had booked a connecting flight to Pakistan via Russia – a flight on which an Israeli basketball team was also travelling. The men were arrested without any evidence, purely due to the fact that they were Pakistani and Muslim. Burney ensured the players' release and repatriation to Pakistan.

==== Pakistanis sold into slavery in Sudan ====
In March 2005, 60 Pakistanis arrived legally in Khartoum, Sudan in search of a better future and to work a job they were promised by an agency at an oil company. However they found themselves to have been sold into slavery at a labour camp in Bageer (near Khartoum). Surrounded by armed guards and with no escape, the men spent five months in the private prison, working as slave labourers and fed mostly boiled rice and dirty water.

When they finally managed to contact the Pakistani Embassy in Sudan they were given full support – until it was revealed that the company that arranged their travel and sold them into slavery was actually owned by a senior minister in Pakistan. The men were abandoned and left to suffer even longer. The Ansar Burney Trust was informed through volunteers and launched a campaign for the return of the men, who were finally returned a few months later.

==== Release of hostages from Somali pirates ====
MV Suez, a Panamanian flag cargo vessel with 22 crew members was hijacked by Somali pirates on 4 August 2010. The crew consisted of eleven Egyptians, six Indians, four Pakistanis and a Sri Lankan. The pirates demanded a ransom of $20 million from the ship's owner; however, they could only manage $1 million. In desperation, the pirates allowed the crew members to contact their homes. Unable to raise the large sum of money to pay the ransom, the families contacted Burney who, along with Governor of Sindh Dr. Israt Ibab, launched a national campaign to raise the funds. Burney travelled to the UAE, Egypt, Somalia, and India in a bid to secure the release of the crew members. He finally succeeded and the vessel was released on 13 June 2011. An operation was then launched by the Pakistan Navy entitled Operation Umeed-e-Nuh to escort the ship and its sailors to Karachi, Pakistan.

==== Offer to bring back the body of Ajmal Kasab ====
In November 2012, after the Government of India stated that Pakistan had refused to claim the body of slain alleged Lashkar-e-Taiba terrorist Ajmal Kasab, Burney offered to bring back the body to Pakistan citing humanitarian reasons.

== Anti-corruption movement ==
On 22 August 2011, Ansar Buney announced that following the Eid-ul-Fitr celebrations at the end of Ramadan, he would initiate an anti-corruption movement in Pakistan based on the popular movement of Anna Hazare in India.

== Allegations ==
While working for the release of Indian prisoners in Pakistan, Sarabjit Singh's sister has alleged that Ansar Burney told her that the Pakistani Army was demanding 250 million rupees to bring Sarabjit Singh back to India.

== Awards and recognition ==
In 1991, due to his work and achievements in the field of human rights at a young age, particularly his efforts for prison reforms and release of innocent prisoners, he was awarded the Outstanding Young Person of the World Award by the Junior Chamber International (JCI).

Burney was the first man to receive the Pakistani National Civil Award Sitara-i-Imtiaz on 23 March 2002. This was the first occasion in the history of Pakistan that such an award was awarded in the field of human rights.

In recognition of his two decade international campaign against human trafficking and child slavery in the Middle East in the form of child camel jockeys, Burney was declared an Anti-Human Trafficking Hero by the then-United States Secretary of State Condoleezza Rice and in the 2005 Trafficking in Persons Report by the United States Department of State.

For his humanitarian work and efforts to improve people to people relations between Pakistan and India, Burney was in 2008 awarded the Mother Teresa Memorial (International) Award by the Harmony Foundation in the field of Social Justice.

In 2011, due to his untiring efforts for the release of MV Suez and its crew from Somali pirates and his great achievements in the field of human rights for the last three decades, Burney was awarded the prestigious MKRF award by the Mir Khalil-ur-Rahman Foundation.

In 2012, in recognition of his humanitarian work in Pakistan and abroad, Burney was awarded the Diamond Award by the Secretary of State for Wales, Cheryl Gillan MP, on the occasion of the Diamond Jubilee of Elizabeth II.

Ten years after receiving the civil award Sitara-i-Imtiaz, on 14 August 2012, the President of Pakistan Asif Ali Zardari announced the civil award Hilal-i-Imtiaz for Ansar Burney. Burney received this honour on 23 March 2013 at the Presidency in Islamabad.

Ansar Burney has been the recipient of over 250 national and international awards over the last three decades. He received an honorary PhD. in Philosophy from Sri Lanka.

He has also received many awards from Pakistan's institutes; recently, he was seen in UET of Lahore.

== Private life ==
Burney married Shaheen on 28 May 1981. They have three children: Fahad, Raheel and a daughter Sana.

== Bibliography ==
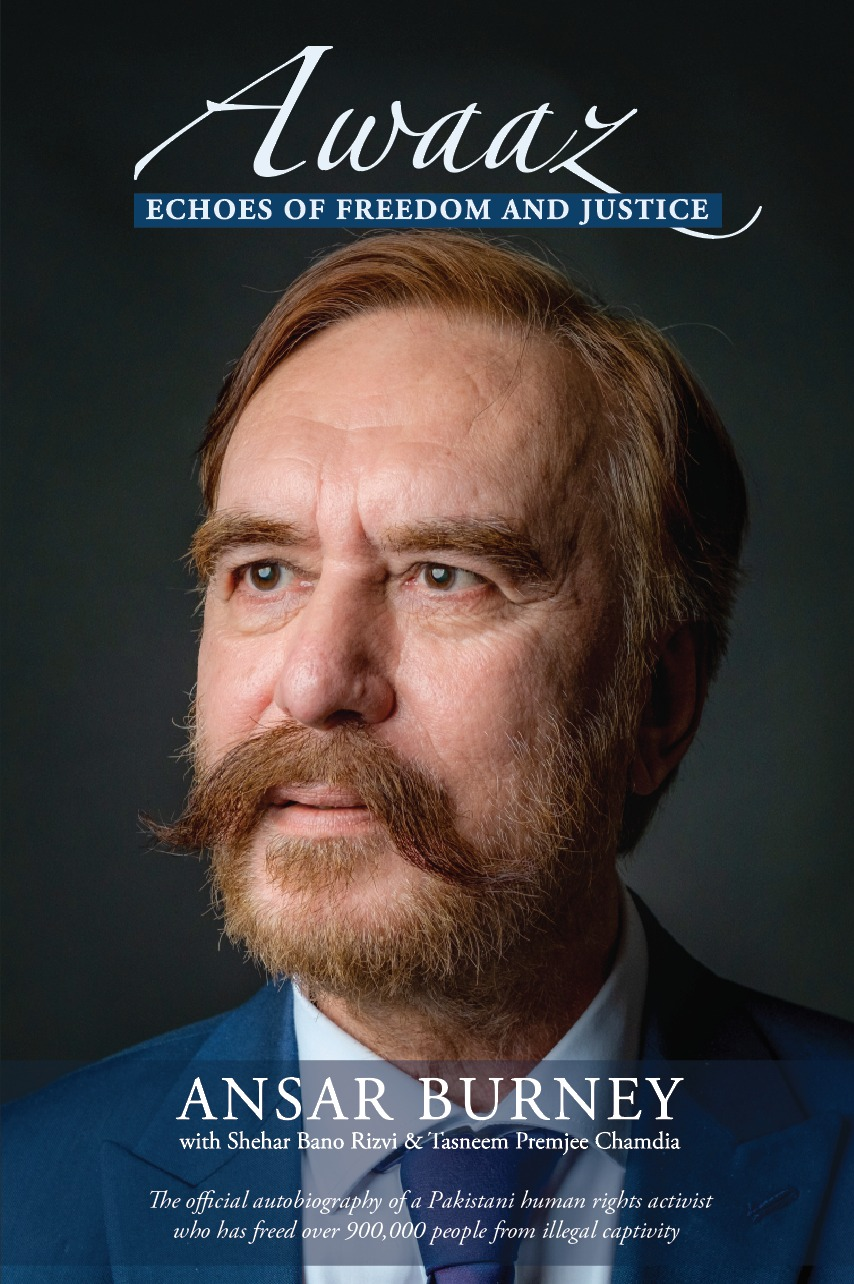
Ansar Burney's official autobiography

Burney published his autobiography, Awaaz: Echoes of Freedom and Justice, in 2024. The book has been co-authored by Shehar Bano Rizvi and Tasneem Premjee Chamdia. Awaaz is published by the Ansar Burney Trust, and 100% of profits from the book's sales go towards the Trust's ongoing social and humanitarian projects.

The book was launched on 18 February 2024, at the Karachi Literature Festival in Pakistan, followed by a press conference at the Karachi Press Club.

=== Articles & reviews ===
- Voice for the Voiceless. Book review by Sheharyar Ahmed for Dawn (April 14, 2024).
- A journey of rights, resilience - An interview with the co-authors, Shehar Bano Rizvi and Tasneem Premjee Chamdia by Kamran Rehmat for Gulf Times.
- Ansar Burney’s 'Awaaz' reaches Doha - by Kamran Rehmat for Gulf Times.
- Ansar Burney discusses his transformation from student leader to champion of rights - Qatar Tribune.
- Awaz, Echoes of Freedom: A Documentation of Ansar Burney's Humanitarian Legacy - Friday Times.
- Legendary Burney’s Awaaz strikes a chord by Kamran Rehmat for Gulf Times.
- Ansar Burney launches his autobiography Awaaz - Business Recorder.
- Job creation is crucial for reducing poverty - The Nation (March 2, 2024).
- Ansar Burney Launches Autobiography Awaaz - Daily Times.
- Ansar Burney, former minister for human rights & recipient of over 250 international awards, launches his autobiography Awaaz - The Azb (February 20, 2024).
