= International Recommended Transit Corridor =

The International Recommended Transit Corridor (IRTC) is a shipping route through the Gulf of Aden that is patrolled against pirates by international naval forces. The IRTC is 490 nautical miles (910 km) long and 20 nautical miles (37 km) wide.

Shipping companies are encouraged to register their vessels' trips through the IRTC with the Maritime Security Centre – Horn of Africa (MSCHOA). This registration is a key component of the operation of the IRTC .
