= HMS Broadsword (F88) =

1979 Type 22 or Broadsword-class frigate of the Royal Navy

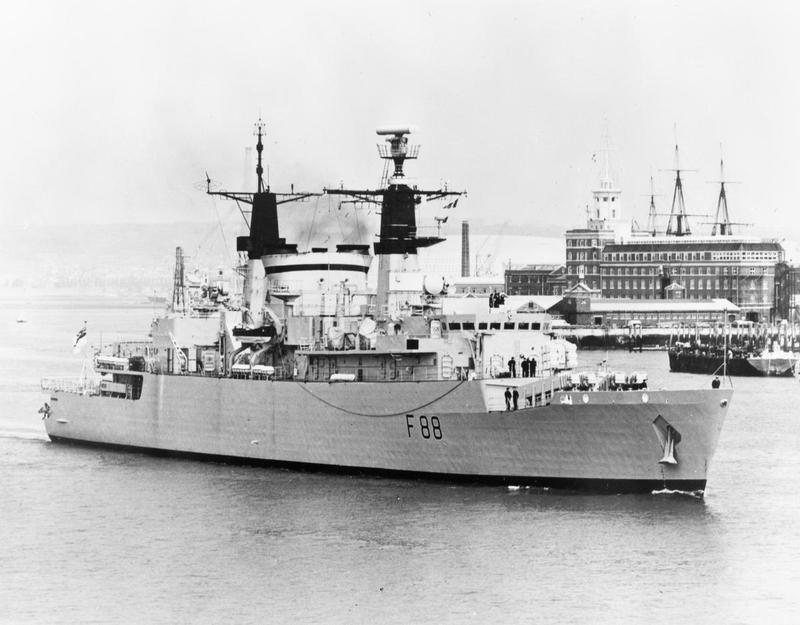
- HMS Broadsword in Portsmouth Harbour, 1982

History

United Kingdom
- Name: Broadsword
- Operator: Royal Navy
- Builder: Yarrow Shipbuilders
- Laid down: 7 February 1975
- Launched: 12 May 1976
- Commissioned: 4 May 1979
- Decommissioned: 31 March 1995
- Home port: HMNB Devonport
- Identification: Pennant number: F88
- Fate: Sold to Brazil 30 June 1995

Brazil
- Name: Greenhalgh
- Operator: Brazilian Navy
- Identification: MMSI number: 710405000; Callsign: PWGH; Pennant number: F46
- Fate: Sunk as target 2024

General characteristics
- Class & type: Type 22 frigate
- Displacement: 4,400 tons
- Length: 131.2 m (430 ft)
- Beam: 14.8 m (48 ft)
- Draught: 6.1 m (20 ft)
- Propulsion: 2 shafts, COGOG; 2 × Rolls-Royce Olympus TM3B boost gas turbines (54,600 shp); 2 × Rolls-Royce Tyne RM1C cruise gas turbines (9,700 shp)
- Speed: 18 knots (33 km/h) cruise; 30 knots (56 km/h) top speed
- Complement: 222
- Armament: 2 × 2x torpedo tubes for Mk-46 torpedoes; 2 ×6 GWS25 Seawolf SAM launchers; 4 × 1 Exocet SSM launchers; 2 × 40 mm Bofors AA guns; 2 × Oerlikon 20 mm cannon
- Aircraft carried: 1 × Lynx Lynx HAS.2 helicopter

HMS Broadsword was the lead ship and first Batch 1 unit of the Type 22 frigates of the Royal Navy.

== Construction ==
Broadsword was ordered from Yarrow Shipbuilders on 8 February 1974 and was laid down at Yarrow's Scotstoun shipyard on 7 February 1975. She was launched on 12 May 1976 and commissioned on 3 May 1979.

== Royal Navy service ==
While on sea trials, Broadsword was called into service as the command ship during the large rescue operation required after storms struck the 1979 Fastnet race.

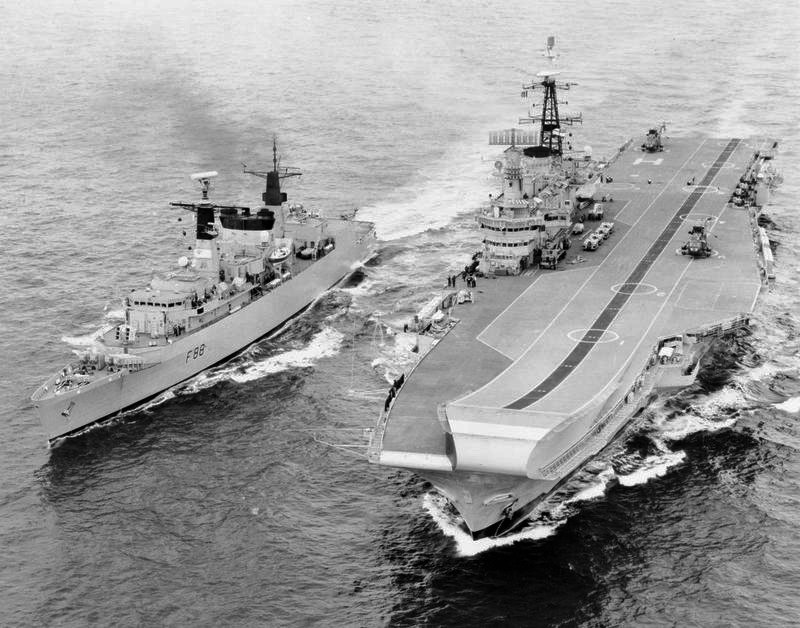
Broadsword in formation with HMS Hermes in 1982

Broadsword took part in the 1982 Falklands War. On 25 May 1982, she was paired with HMS Coventry to draw Argentine aircraft away from the landings at San Carlos. If Coventry's long range Sea Dart missiles missed, then Broadsword's shorter range Sea Wolf missile system could engage aircraft (and missiles). Two pairs of Argentine aircraft attacked the ships at low level. Coventry was not able to achieve a missile lock on the first pair and Broadsword's Sea Wolf system shut down. Broadsword was hit by one bomb from the first pair, which bounced up through the helicopter deck, hitting the Westland Lynx helicopter, before exiting and exploding harmlessly. The other pair of aircraft targeted Coventry which made a turn to reduce her profile—this took her into the line of fire of Broadsword's Sea Wolf system, preventing Broadsword from firing on the aircraft. Bombs from the two Argentine Douglas A-4 Skyhawks damaged and sunk the Coventry. Broadsword subsequently rescued 170 of the sunken Coventry's crew.

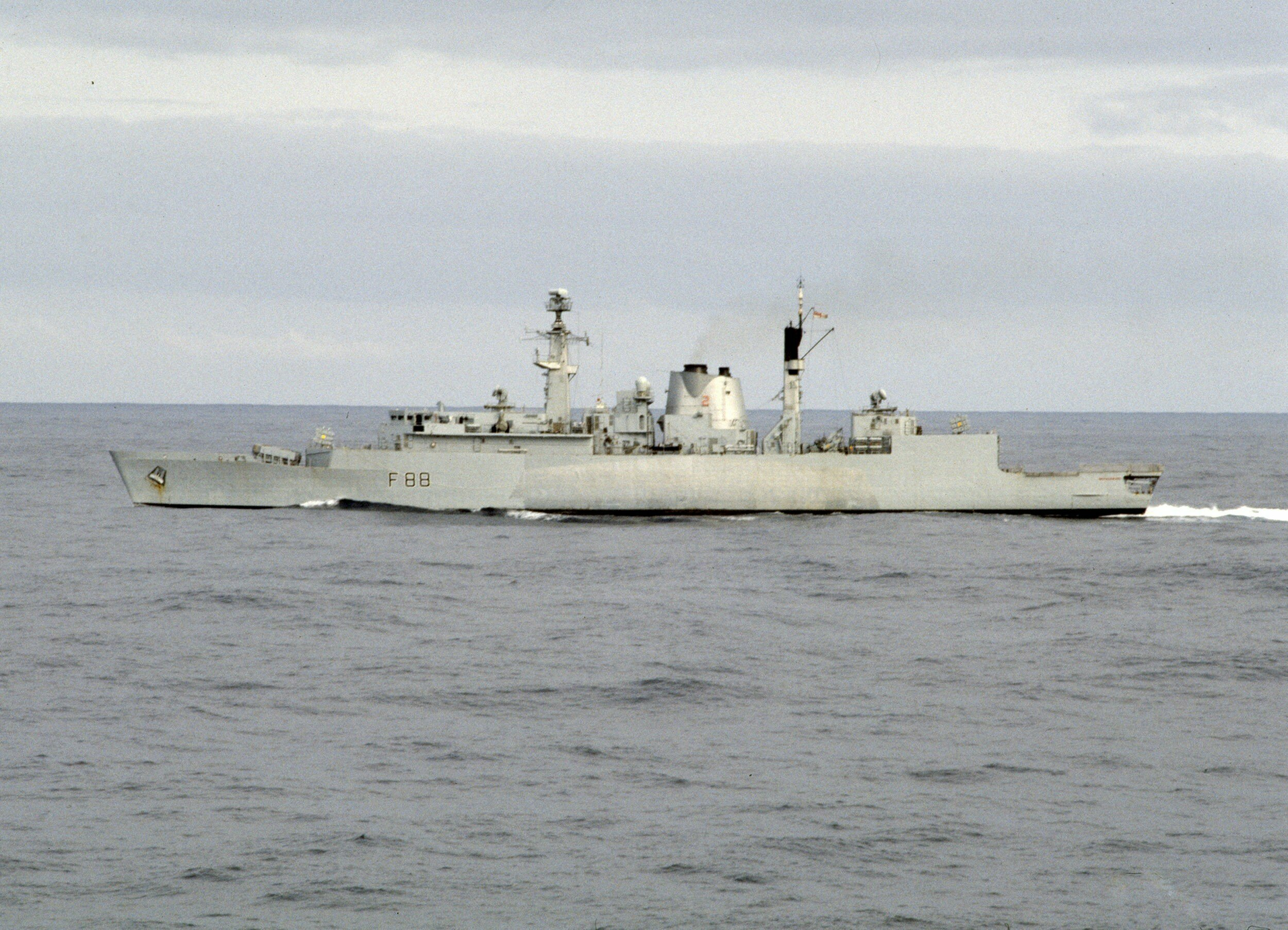
Broadsword, port view

She shot down one IAI Dagger of FAA Grupo 6 and shared an Douglas A-4C Skyhawk kill with HMS Antelope's SeaCat, land-based Rapiers and Blowpipe surface to air missiles.

Captain G W R Biggs commanded Broadsword between 10 April 1985 and 15 May 1986 and Commander M W G Kerr who commanded between 27 July 1988 and 18 May 1990 both subsequently became flag officers.

In 1993 Broadsword took part in the naval operation in support of Operation Grapple (Yugoslavia), in the Adriatic Sea. Upon completion on 8 July 1993, a fire broke out in the aft auxiliary machinery room which resulted in the deaths of two on-watch engineers.

By July 1994, HMS Broadsword was serving as the West Indies Guard Ship until she returned to the United Kingdom in March 1995 for decommissioning.

== Brazilian service ==
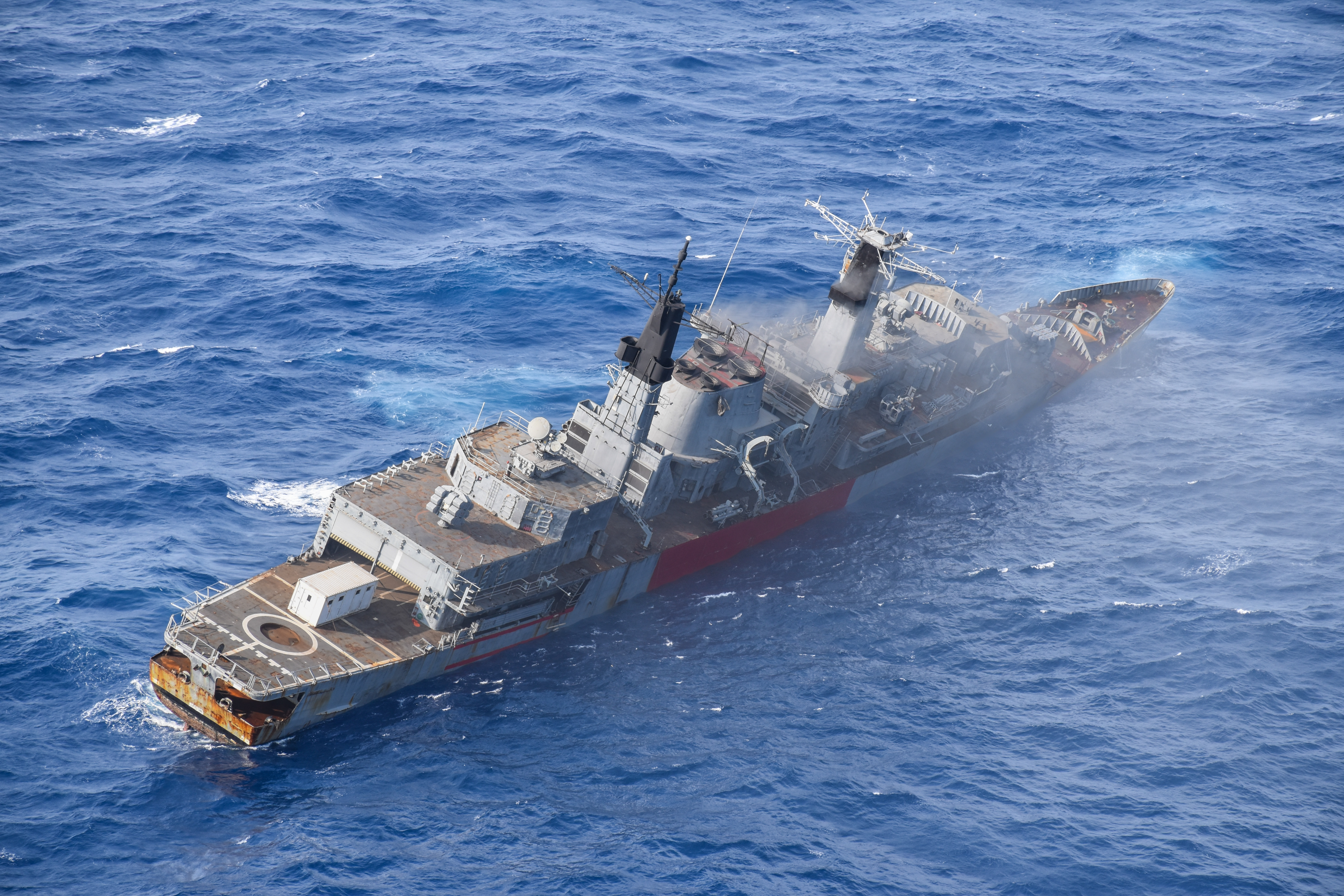
Greenhalgh, before sunk as target in the South Atlantic Ocean

In November 1994, Broadsword was sold to Brazil alongside her sisters HMS Brazen, HMS Brilliant, and HMS Battleaxe for £116,000,000. She was officially decommissioned from Royal Navy service on 31 March 1995 and entered the Brazilian Navy on 30 June 1995 as Greenhalgh.

Greenhalgh was the first Brazilian navy ship to integrate in a U.S. strike group in July 2008 during a Composite Training Unit Exercise (COMPUTEX) led by USS Iwo Jima.

On 10 August 2021, Greenhalgh was decommissioned from Brazilian service. On 13 September 2024, the ship was sunk as target during a SINKEX near Rio de Janeiro.

== Publications ==
- Colledge, J. J.; Warlow, Ben (2006) [1969]. Ships of the Royal Navy: The Complete Record of All Fighting Ships of the Royal Navy from the 15th Century to the Present (3rd Rev ed.). London: Chatham Publishing. ISBN 978-1-86176-281-8. OCLC 67375475.
- Prézelin, Bernard; Baker III, A.D., eds. (1991). The Naval Institute Guide to Combat Fleets of the World 1990/1991. Annapolis, Maryland, USA: Naval Institute Press. ISBN 0-87021-250-8.
