= Romanian frigate Regele Ferdinand =

Frigate originally built for Royal navy, Now in service with Romanian Naval forces

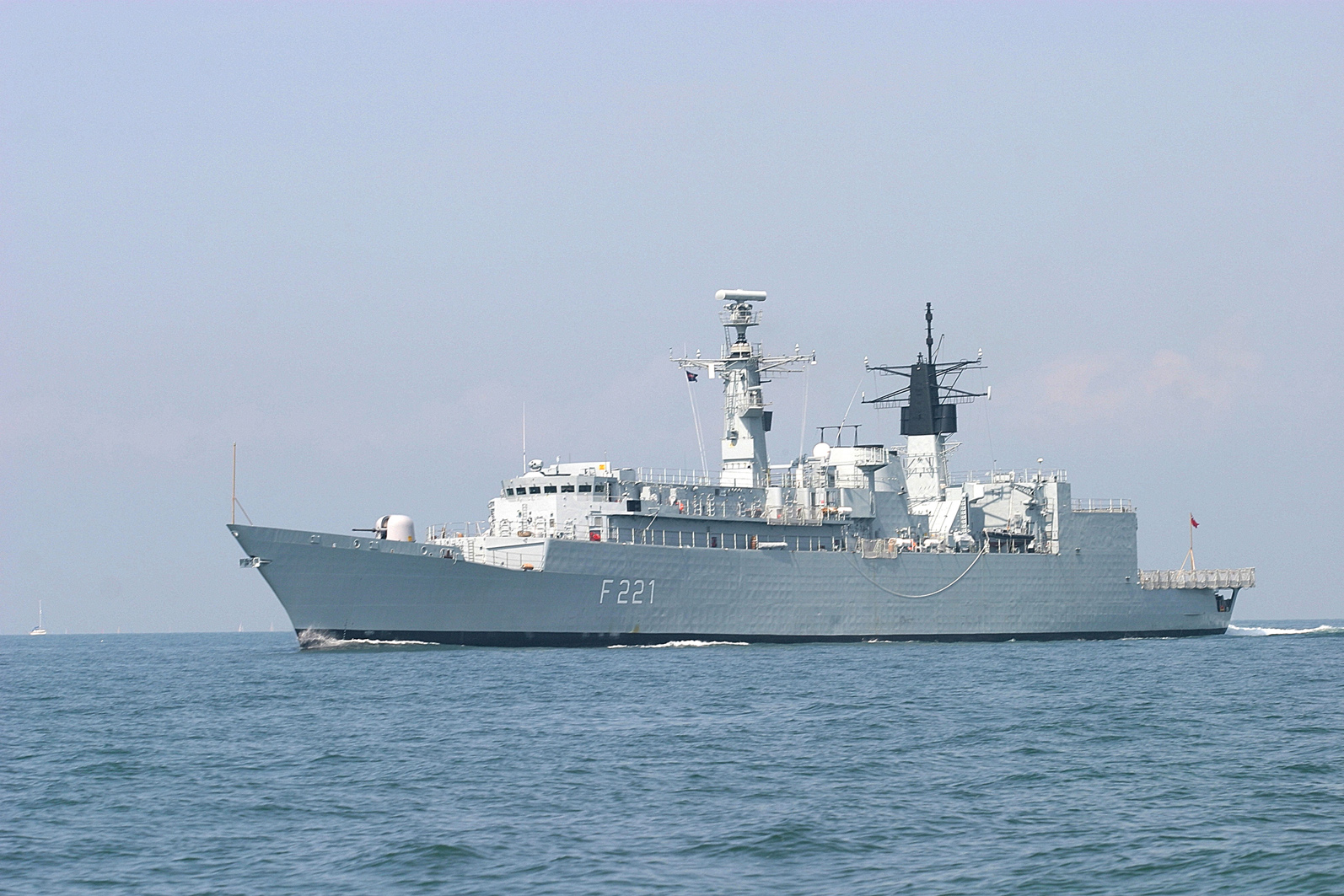
- Regele Ferdinand, the flagship of the Romanian Navy

History

United Kingdom
- Name: HMS Coventry
- Namesake: HMS Coventry (D118)
- Builder: Swan Hunter
- Laid down: 29 March 1984
- Launched: 8 April 1986
- Commissioned: 14 October 1988
- Decommissioned: 17 January 2002
- Identification: Pennant number: F98
- Fate: Sold to Romania on 14 January 2003
- Badge

Romania
- Name: Regele Ferdinand
- Namesake: King Ferdinand of Romania
- Acquired: 14 January 2003
- Commissioned: 9 September 2004
- Identification: Pennant number: F221; MMSI number: 264800090; MarineTraffic ID: 5799671; Callsign:YQYM
- Status: In active service
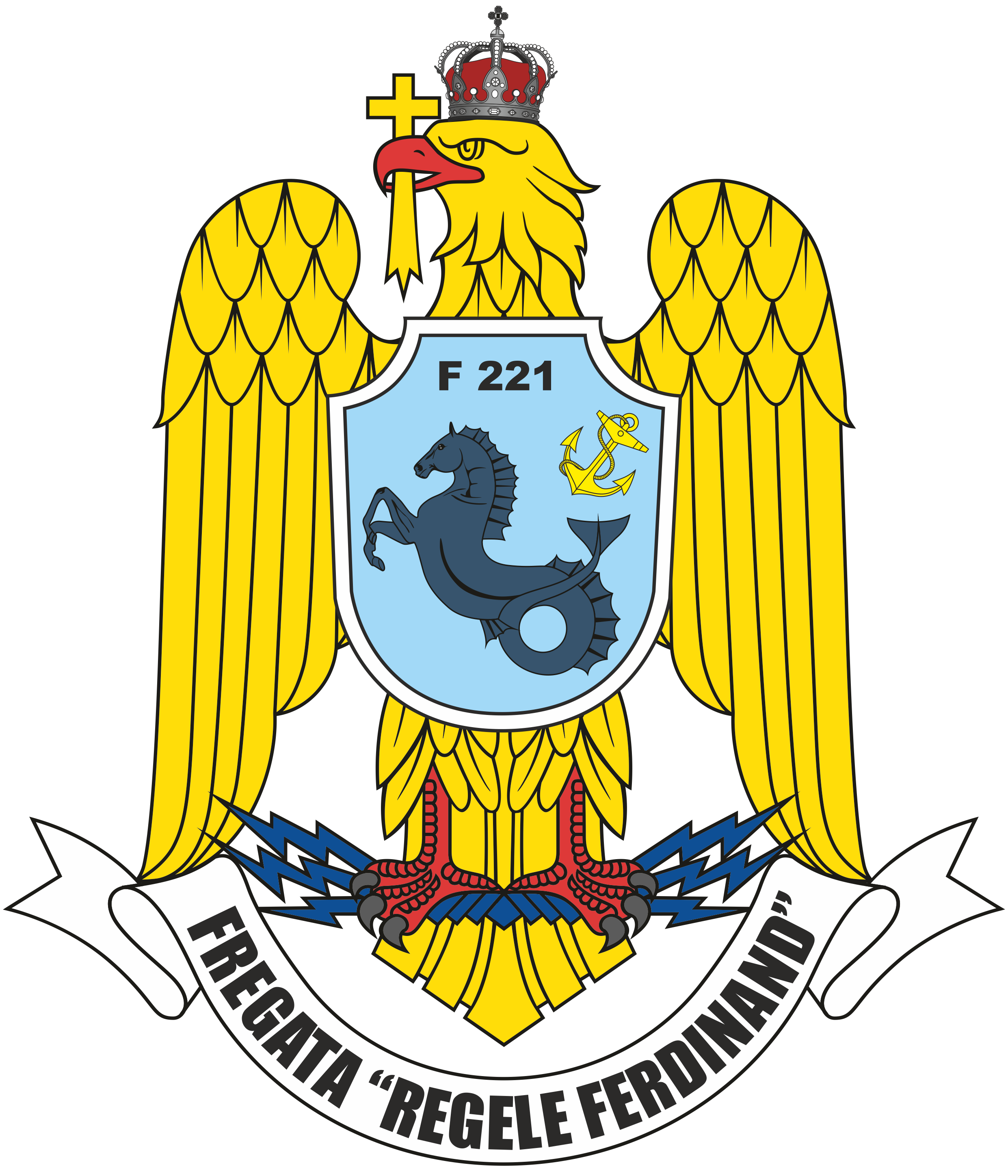
- Badge

General characteristics (as HMS Coventry)
- Class & type: Type 22 frigate
- Displacement: 4,800 tons
- Length: 146.5 m (481 ft)
- Beam: 14.8 m (49 ft)
- Draught: 6.4 m (21 ft)
- Propulsion: 2-shaft COGOG; 2 × Rolls-Royce Olympus TM3B high-speed gas turbines (54,000 shp / 40 MW); 2 × Rolls-Royce Tyne RM1C cruise gas turbines (9,700 shp / 7.2 MW)
- Speed: 18 knots (33 km/h; 21 mph) (cruise); 30 knots (56 km/h; 35 mph) (max)
- Range: 8,000 nautical miles (15,000 km; 9,200 mi)
- Complement: 273
- Armament: 2 × 6 GWS25 Sea Wolf SAM launchers; 4 × 1 Exocet SSM launchers; 2 × Twin 30 mm AA guns; 2 × 20 mm GAM-BO1 guns; 4 × 7.62 mm GPMGs
- Aircraft carried: 2 × Lynx MK 8 helicopters

General characteristics (as Regele Ferdinand)
- Class & type: Type 22 frigate
- Displacement: 5,300 tons
- Length: 148.1 m (486 ft)
- Beam: 14.8 m (49 ft)
- Draught: 6.4 m (21 ft)
- Propulsion: 2 × Rolls-Royce Olympus TM3B high-speed gas turbines (54,000 shp / 40 MW); 2 × Pratt & Whitney ST40M turbine engines
- Speed: 18 knots (33 km/h; 21 mph) (cruise); 30 knots (56 km/h; 35 mph) (max)
- Range: 4,500 nautical miles (8,300 km; 5,200 mi)
- Complement: 250
- Armament: 76/62 Oto Melara Super-Rapid gun
- Aircraft carried: IAR-330 Puma Naval; MQ-35A V-BAT UAV

Regele Ferdinand (F221) is a Type 22 frigate of the Romanian Naval Forces, formerly a Royal Navy ship named HMS Coventry (F98). She was originally intended to be named Boadicea but was named Coventry in honour of the previous Coventry, a Type 42 destroyer sunk in the Falklands War. Following service in the Royal Navy she was sold to the Romanian Navy in 2003.

== Operational Service ==
=== Royal Navy ===
Between 1990 and 1996 Coventry was the leader of the 1st Frigate Squadron. The ship received the freedom of the city of Coventry in 1988.

=== Romanian Navy ===
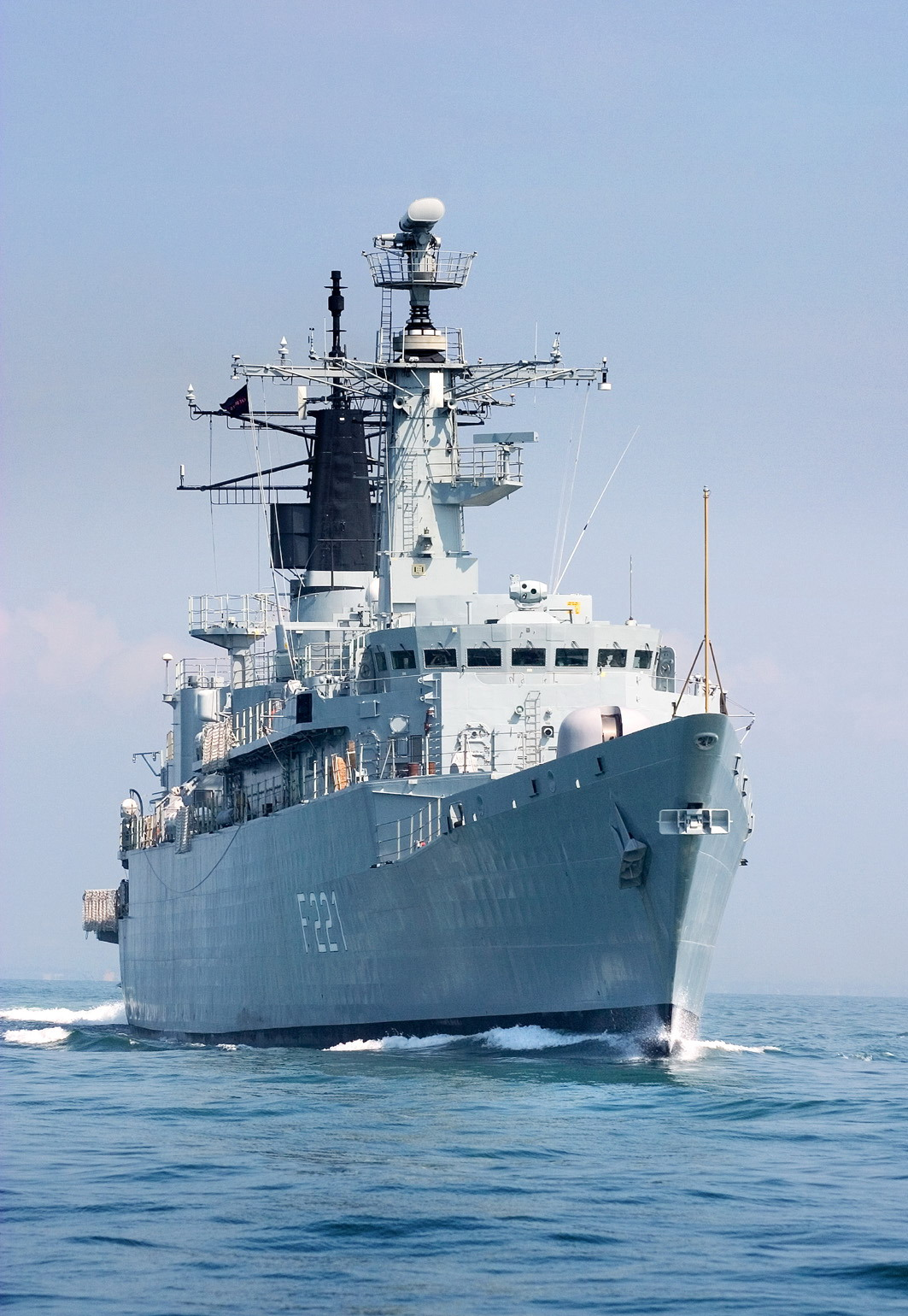
Regele Ferdinand in 2005

She was purchased from the United Kingdom by the Romanian Navy on 14 January 2003, and renamed Regele Ferdinand (King Ferdinand) after Ferdinand I of Romania. The ship was handed over to Romania on 19 August 2004, and underwent sea trials at the same time. Regele Ferdinand was commissioned into the Romanian Navy on 9 September 2004 with the pennant number F221, and is the current flagship of the Romanian Navy. There has since been some controversy over the price at which she was bought.

On 22 March 2011, President of Romania Traian Băsescu said, after a CSAT meeting, that Romania will send the frigate Regele Ferdinand with 205 mariners and two officers on board to enforce an arms embargo in the Mediterranean Sea, as part of the 2011 military intervention in Libya - Operation Unified Protector. During their run in the NATO naval group acting on Operation Unified Protector - 2011, the frigate has traveled over 17,400 nautical miles (32,200 km) and carried out around 770 specific tasks.

Since entry into service of the Romanian Navy, Regele Ferdinand has performed a series of tasks among which the most important are deployments to Operation Active Endeavour in 2005, 2007, 2008, 2010 in the Mediterranean Sea, the exercise in Bulgaria "Breeze -CertExam" 2007, 2008, the exercise "Noble Midas" in Croatia in 2007 and 2008 in Italy.

Since 13 September 2012 Regele Ferdinand has participated in Operation Atalanta. The ship embarked naval commandos of Grupul Naval de Forțe pentru Operații Speciale (GNFOS).

In August 2014, Regele Ferdinand sailed alongside Standing NATO Maritime Group 2 Task Unit 2 which operated in the Black Sea as part of Exercise Sea Breeze.

In July 2019, the Romanian authorities announced the selection of Naval Group and its partner Santierul Naval Constanta (SNC) for the programme to build four new Gowind multi-mission corvettes and to modernise the T22 frigates.

As of 2021, Romanian authorities were working in collaboration with the Romanian COMOTI institute to replace two of the Rolls-Royce gas turbine engines with two ST40M turbine engines designed at COMOTI.

While the ship type was designed to employ both Sea Wolf and Exocet missiles, as of 2025 Romania does not possess these two types of missiles.

== Gallery ==
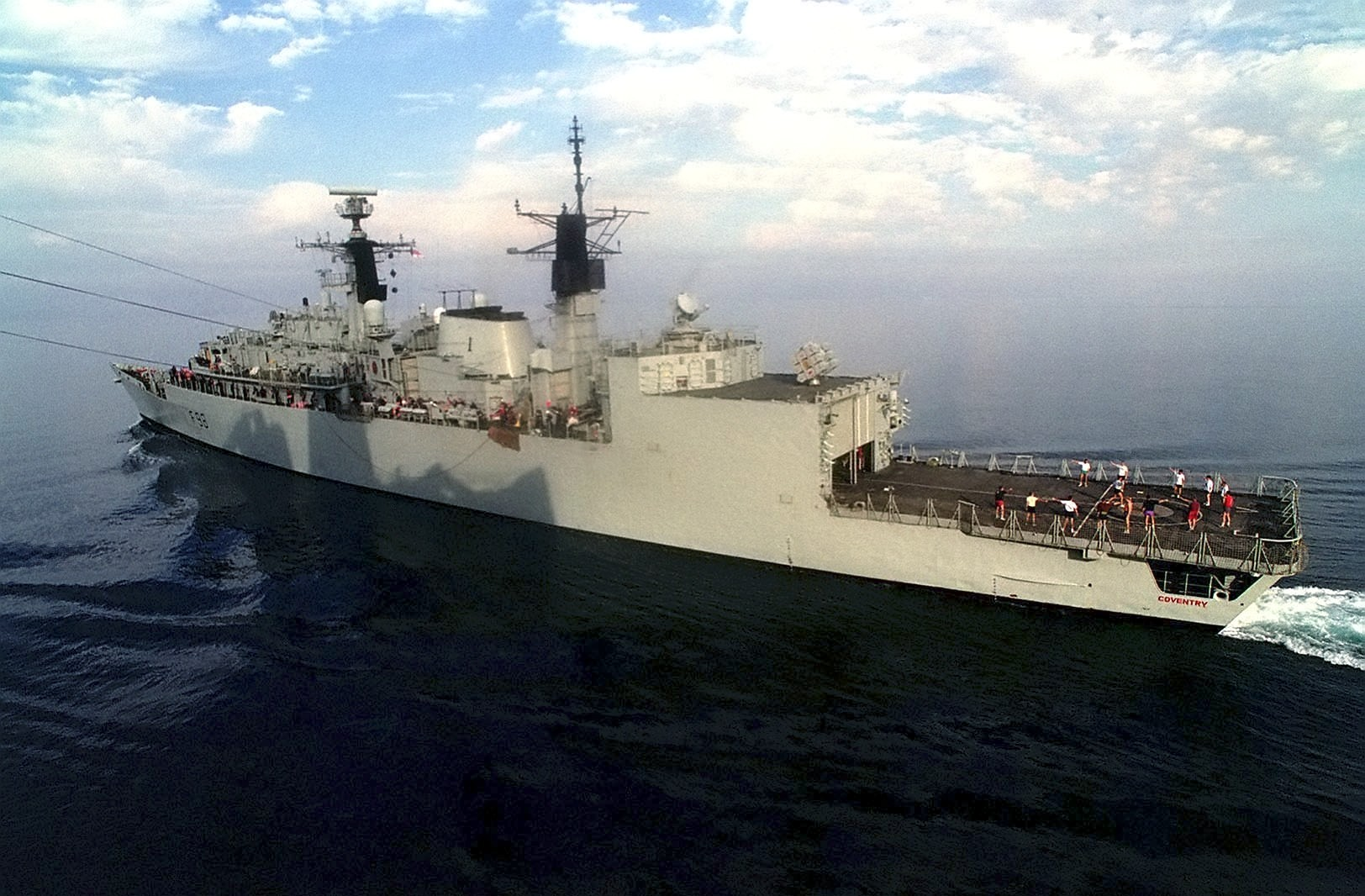
HMS Coventry (F98), conducts an underway replenishment while on station in the Persian Gulf.

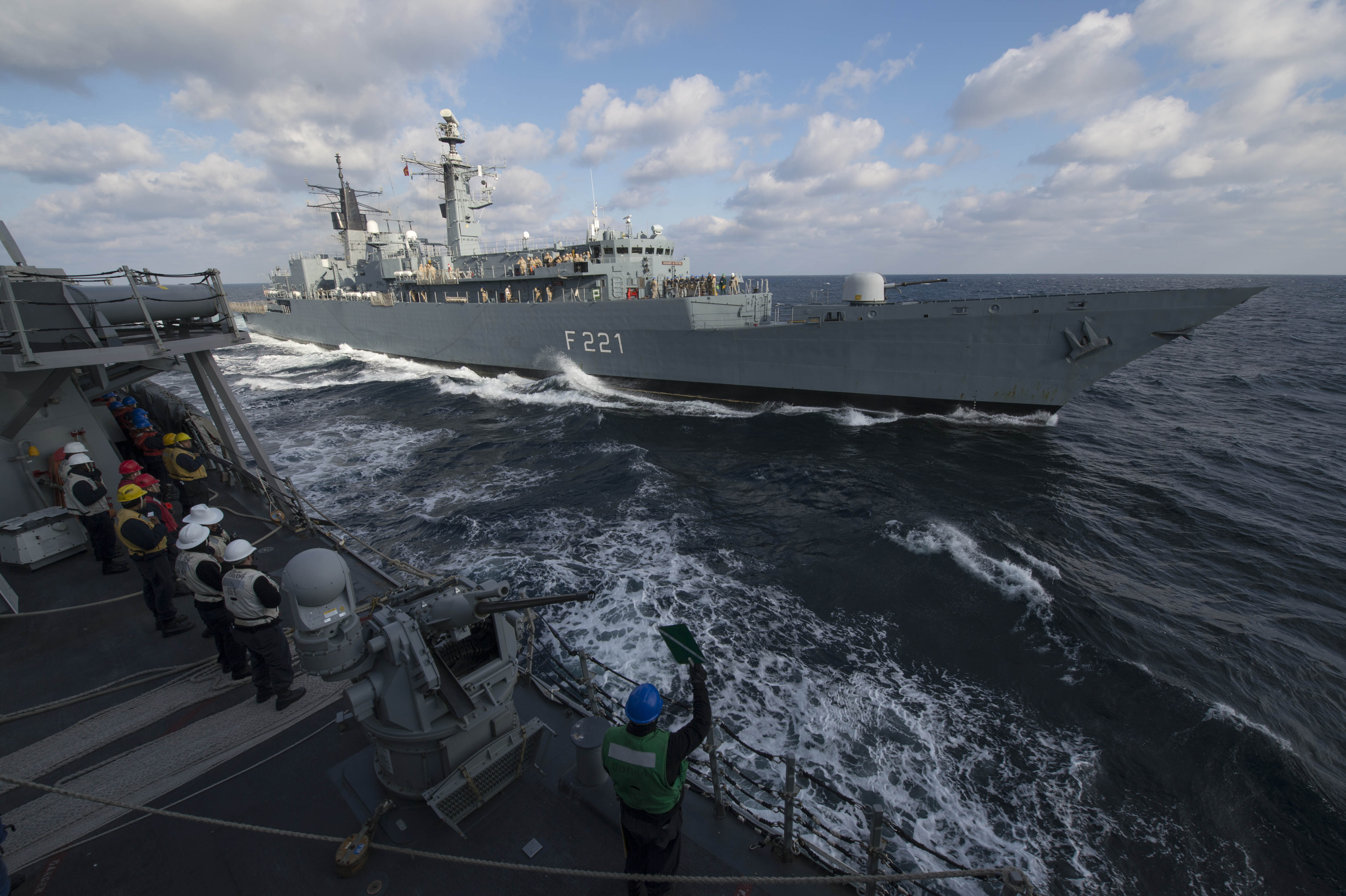
The Romanian Navy frigate Regele Ferdinand (F221) approaches USS Carney (DDG-64) to conduct replenishment-at-sea training in the Black Sea 28 Oct. 2016.

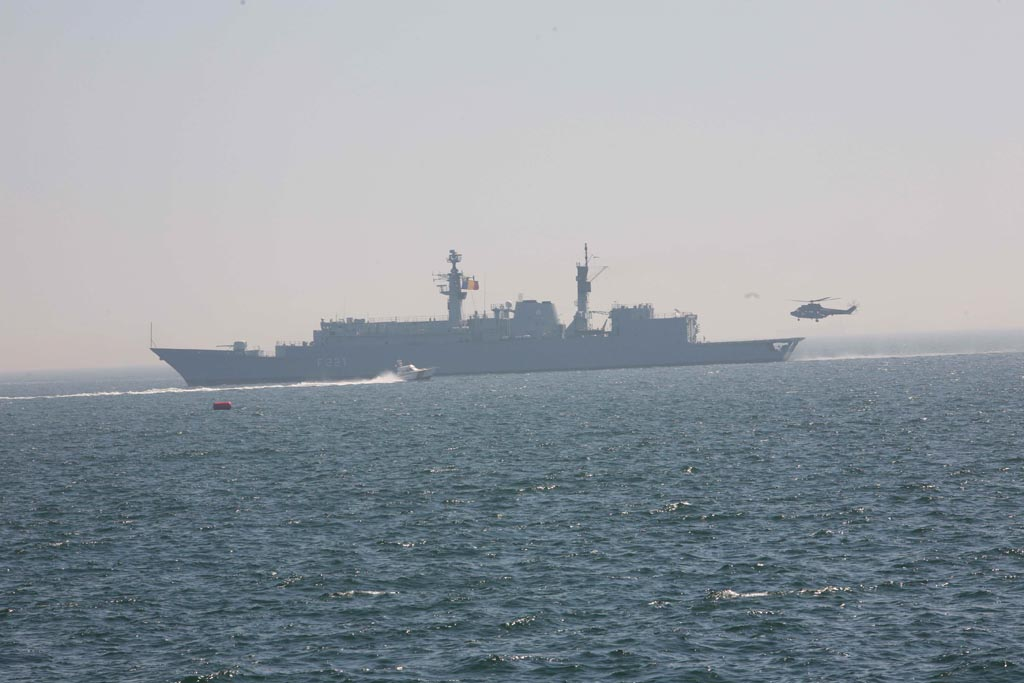
Navy helicopter landing on Regele Ferdinand.

== See also ==
- Regele Ferdinand class, a World War II-era namesake
- NMS Regele Ferdinand (Regele Ferdinand class destroyer)
