= HMS Brazen (F91) =

1982 Type 22 or Broadsword-class frigate of the Royal Navy

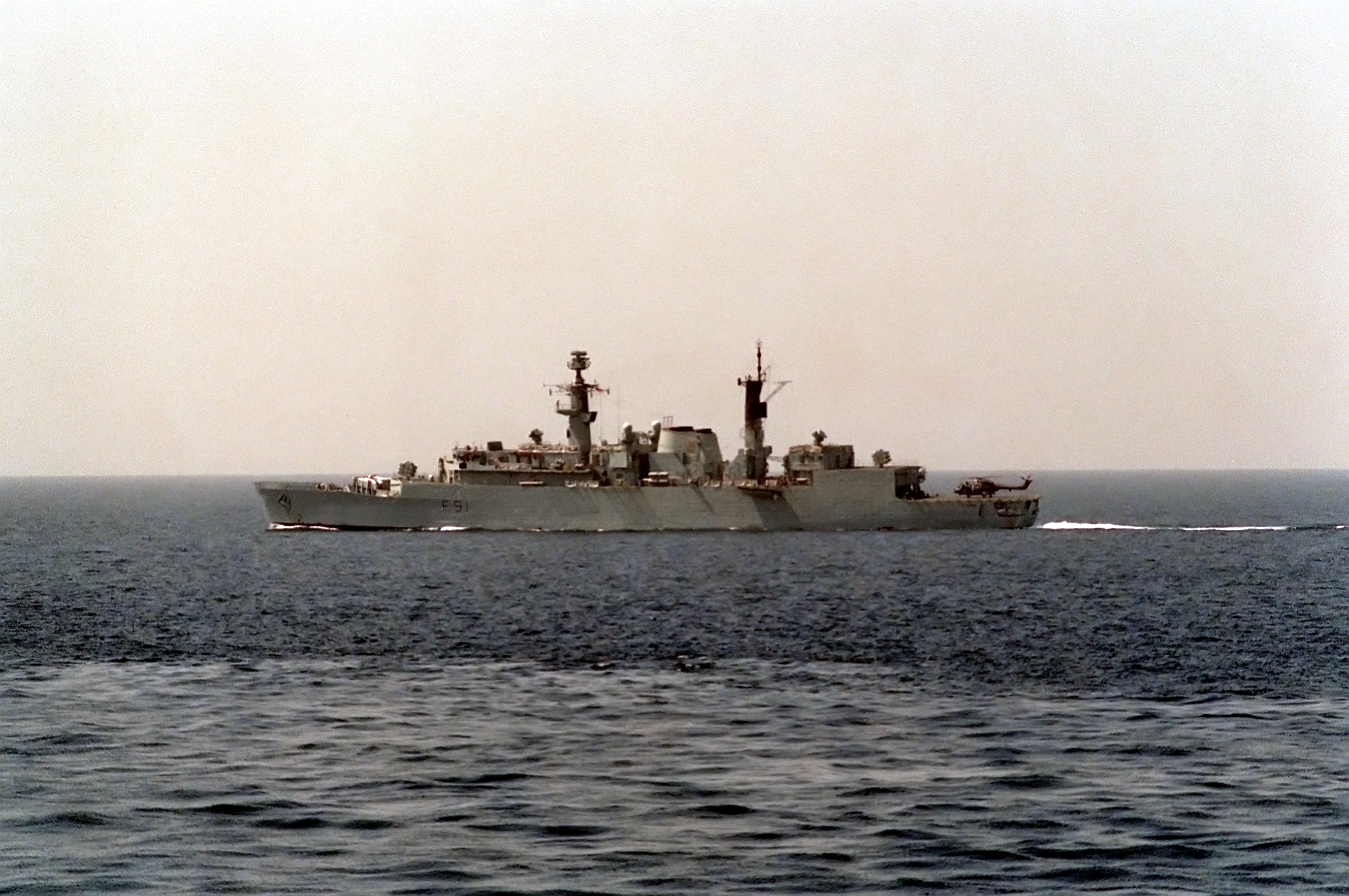
- HMS Brazen

History

United Kingdom
- Name: Brazen
- Builder: Yarrow Shipbuilders
- Laid down: 18 August 1978
- Launched: 4 March 1980
- Commissioned: 2 July 1982
- Decommissioned: 30 August 1996
- Identification: Pennant number: F91
- Honours and awards: "Kuwait 1991"
- Fate: Sold to Brazil 18 November 1994

Brazil
- Name: Bosisio
- Namesake: Almirante Paulo Bosísio
- Acquired: 18 November 1994
- Commissioned: 30 August 1996
- Decommissioned: 29 September 2015
- Home port: Rio de Janeiro
- Identification: Pennant number: F-48; MMSI number: 709360424; Callsign: PWBO
- Fate: Sunk as target, July 2017

General characteristics
- Class & type: Type 22 frigate
- Displacement: 4,400 tons
- Length: 131.2 m (430 ft 5 in)
- Beam: 14.8 m (48 ft 7 in)
- Draught: 6.1 m (20 ft 0 in)
- Propulsion: 2 shafts, COGOG; 2 × Rolls-Royce Olympus TM3B boost gas turbines, 54,600 shp (40,700 kW); 2 × Rolls-Royce Tyne RM1C cruise gas turbines, 9,700 shp (7,200 kW)
- Speed: 30 knots (56 km/h; 35 mph) max
- Complement: 222
- Armament: 2 × 2 × torpedo tubes for Mk 46 torpedoes; 2 × 6 GWS25 Seawolf surface-to-air missile launchers; 4 × 1 Exocet surface-to-surface missile launchers; 2 × 40 mm Bofors AA guns; 2 × Oerlikon 20 mm cannon
- Aircraft carried: 2 × Lynx MK 8 helicopters
- Aviation facilities: Helipad and hangar

HMS Brazen was a Type 22 frigate of the Royal Navy. She was completed three months ahead of schedule due to the Falklands War.

== Royal Navy service ==
Brazen served on the Armilla Patrol which became a task force during the Gulf War as part of Operation Granby. For this she received the battle honour "Kuwait 1991". On 24 January 1991, Brazen would screen the British Casualty Receiving ship RFA Argus when a pair of Iraqi Mirage F1 aircraft made a run for the vessel, armed with AM39 Exocet anti-ship missiles. The Iraqi aircraft were shot down by Saudi F-15C fighter aircraft before they could fire their anti-ship missiles. During the war, her Lynx helicopter attacked fast patrol boats.

By late 1995, Brazen was back in active service, operating in the Adriatic Sea as part of a Royal Navy task group led by the aircraft carrier HMS Ark Royal for Operation Sharp Guard. In early 1996, Brazen rescued 30 Albanians from a sinking vessel. In May 1996, she returned to Devonport for the final time before being officially handed over to the Brazilian Navy in August 1996.

=== 1994 Grounding ===
On the night of 11 September 1994, following a deployment to the Falkland Islands, Brazen was returning home via the Patagonian Canals when she ran aground on charted rocks in the Paso Shoal passage. The weather was unpredictable, "gusting from calm to storm force in minutes", though at the time of the grounding visibility was 5 miles with light rain. The collision took place just after low tide. The subsequent investigation found that the ship had missed a planned turn around the time of watch handover and continued ahead into rocks.

On grounding, the ship rode up over a pinnacle before coming to rest with the bow on a ledge elevated two metres from normal waterline, with a 3° list to port. Flooding was successfully contained within 90 minutes, and a first, unsuccessful atempt to refloat the ship was made at the next high tide. Over the next day, fuel, water and stores were moved aft and pressurised air and inflatable bags were used to add buoyancy to the bow, however the second attempt to refloat under the ship's own power was also unsuccessful. A small Chilean tug attended in the evening, but while it was able to prevent the ship from yawing in the wind and current (a danger due to proximity to more rocks to starboard) the third attempt to refloat was also unsuccessful.

Afer one more abortive attempt called off due to foul weather, at 0700 on the 13^{th} (79 hours after grounding) a larger tug arrived and begun preparing for the final, ultimately successful refloating. For this attempt, 140 of the ship's company were mustered on the flight deck "and succeeded in rocking the ship 2° to 3° about the upright" through "...co-ordinated jumping, in phase with the resonant frequency of the ship..." raising the bow. This rocking proved successful in freeing the ship and allowed the two tugs and the ship's own engines to pull the ship off the rocks.

The ship manoeuvred into a safe anchorage under its own power, before proceeding to Talchahuano, Chile for initial repair work. The ship then returned to Devonport for further work. The total cost of repair was estimated at £2.5 million.

The subsequent court martial in February 1995 found the commanding officer guilty and dismissed him from his then current role, after he admitted negligence in allowing an inexperienced officer to take charge of the ship as Officer of the Watch (OOW) when the incident took place. The OOW pled guilty to negligence but this was not accepted by the court martial, as she had only been on the bridge for eight minutes at the time of the grounding, and was insufficiently supervised having only piloted Brazen once previously. The navigating officer was also reprimanded for negligence and failing to preserve navigation data.

== Brazilian service ==
She was purchased from the United Kingdom by the Brazilian Navy on 18 November 1994, and renamed Bosísio. The ship was commissioned into the Brazilian Navy on 30 August 1996.

In June 2009, Bosísio participated in the recovery mission for the wreckage of Air France Flight 447.

She was decommissioned from Brazilian Navy service on 23 September 2015. The ship was sunk as a target in July 2017 during the Brazilian Navy operation 'MISSILEX 2017'.

== Publications ==
- Colledge, J. J.; Warlow, Ben (2006) [1969]. Ships of the Royal Navy: The Complete Record of All Fighting Ships of the Royal Navy from the 15th Century to the Present (3rd Rev ed.). London: Chatham Publishing. ISBN 978-1-86176-281-8. OCLC 67375475.
