= Type 22 frigate =

Class of frigates built for the Royal Navy

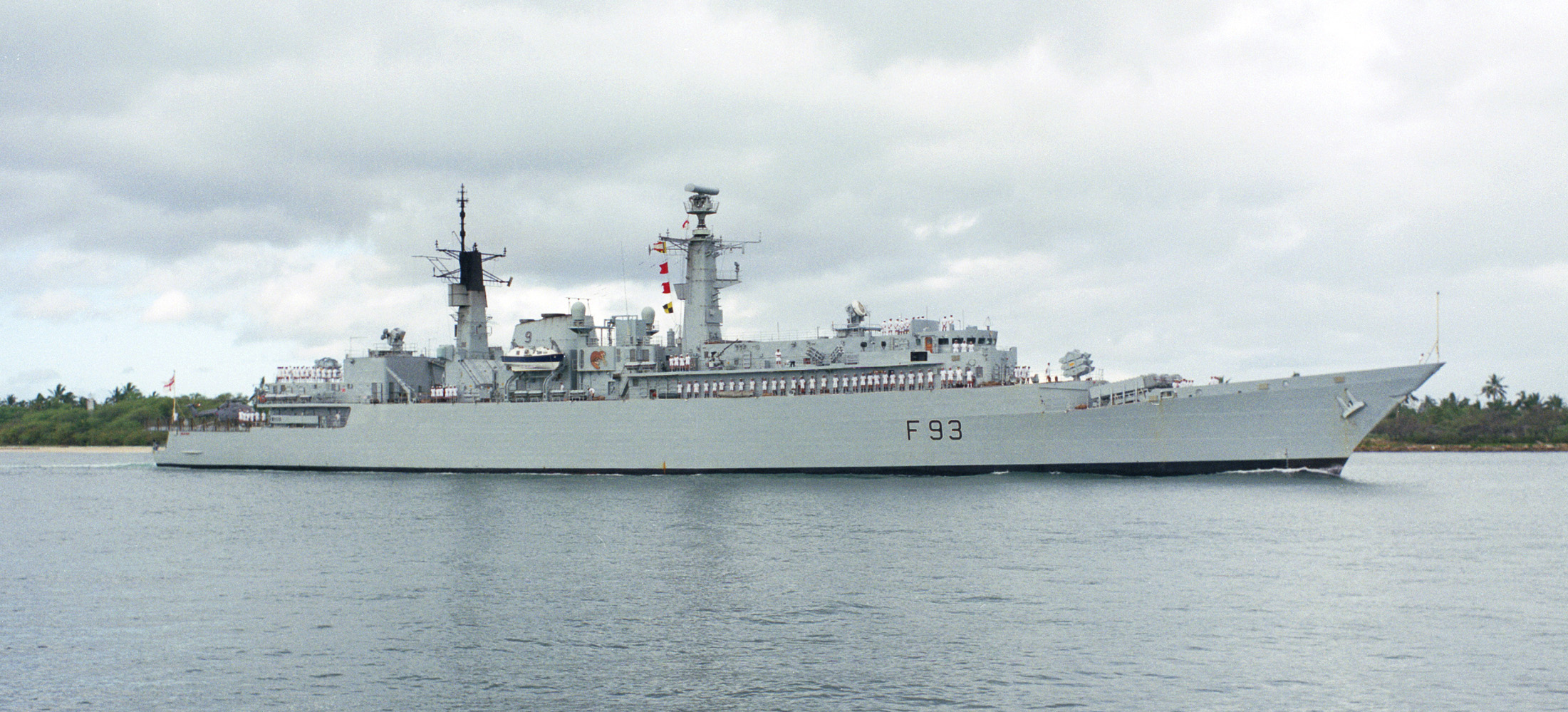
- HMS Beaver, 30 June 1986

Class overview
- Builders: Yarrow (Shipbuilders) Ltd, Cammell Laird, Swan Hunter
- Operators: Royal Navy (former operator); Brazilian Navy; Romanian Naval Forces; Chilean Navy
- Preceded by: Type 21
- Succeeded by: Type 23 (United Kingdom); Tamandaré class (Brazil)
- Subclasses: Batch 1 Broadsword; Batch 2 Boxer; Batch 3 Cornwall
- In commission: 3 May 1979 – 30 June 2011
- Completed: 14
- Active: 4 (with Brazil, Romania and Chile)
- Retired: 10 (3 sunk as targets)

General characteristics
- Displacement: Batch 1: 4,500 tonnes, standard; Batch 2: 4,800 tonnes, standard; Batch 3: 5,300 tonnes, standard
- Length: Batch 1: 131.2 m (430 ft); Batch 2: 146.5 m (481 ft); Batch 3: 148.1 m (486 ft)
- Beam: 14.8 m (49 ft)
- Draft: Batch 1: 6.1 m (20 ft); Batch 2 & 3: 6.4 m (21 ft)
- Propulsion: Batch 1 plus Boxer, Beaver, London, Sheffield & Coventry: 2-shaft COGOG; 2 Rolls-Royce Marine Olympus TM3B high-speed gas turbines: 54,000 shp (40 MW); 2 Rolls-Royce Tyne RM1C cruise gas turbines: 9,700 shp (7.2 MW); Batch 2, Brave & Batch 3: 2-shaft COGAG (Brave remained COGOG); 2 Rolls-Royce Marine Spey SM1A boost gas turbines: 37,400 shp (27.9 MW); 2 Rolls-Royce Tyne RM3C cruise gas turbines: 9,700 shp (7.2 MW)
- Speed: 30 knots (56 km/h) full; 18 knots (33 km/h) cruise
- Complement: Batch 1: 222; Batch 2: 273; Batch 3: 250
- Sensors & processing systems: 1 × Type 967/968 air-search radar; 2 × Type 910 or 911 fire-control radars; 1 × Type 1006 or 1007 navigation radar; 1 × Type 2016 sonar (Batch 1 & 2); 1 × Type 2050 sonar (Batch 3); 1 × Type 2031Z towed array sonar (Batch 2 & 3); 1 × Type 162M bottom target classification sonar; 1 × Type 2008 underwater comms system
- Electronic warfare & decoys: NATO Seagnat decoy launchers
- Armament: Batch 1 and 2: 2 × Sextuple Sea Wolf anti-air missile launchers; 4 × Exocet MM-38 anti-ship missile launchers; 2 × triple STWS-2 tubes for Mk.46 or Stingray anti-submarine torpedoes; 2 × 40mm Bofors guns; 2 × 20 mm GAM-BO1 guns; L7A2 GPMGs; M134 Miniguns; Batch 3: 2 × Sextuple Sea Wolf anti-air missile launchers; 2 × quad Harpoon anti-ship missile launchers; 2 × triple STWS-2 tubes for Mk.46 or Stingray anti-submarine torpedoes; 1 × 4.5-inch (113 mm) Mk.8 gun; 1 × 30mm Goalkeeper CIWS; 2 × 30mm DS30B guns or 2 × 20 mm GAM-BO1 guns; L7A2 GPMGs; M134 Miniguns
- Aircraft carried: 1 or 2 × Westland Lynx helicopters, armed with: 2 × L7A2 GPMGs machine guns, and; 4 × Sea Skua anti-ship missiles, or; 2 × Sting Ray anti-submarine torpedoes; Brave onwards capable of handling 1 × Sea King or Merlin helicopter.
- Aviation facilities: Flight deck and hangar

The Type 22 frigate also known as the Broadsword class was a class of frigates built for the British Royal Navy. Fourteen were built in total, with production divided into three batches.

Initially intended to be anti-submarine warfare frigates as part of NATO contribution, the ships became general purpose warships.

HMS Cornwall was the last Royal Navy Type 22 frigate, retired from service on 30 June 2011.

Five Type 22s were scrapped and two more were sunk as targets. The seven other vessels were sold to the Brazilian, Romanian and Chilean navies; four of these remain in service, one was sunk as a target, one laid up, and one sold for scrap (see detail in disposal section).

== Ship naming ==
=== Broadsword, Boxer ===
It was originally envisaged that all Type 22s would have names beginning with 'B' (Broadsword, etc.), following the 'A' names used for Type 21 frigates (Amazon, etc.). This changed after the Falklands War when two replacement ships were ordered for the destroyers sunk (Sheffield and Coventry) and were named to commemorate them. Another vessel ordered earlier but not yet started, which was to be named Bloodhound was renamed London.

=== Cornwall ===
The alphabetical progression was re-established with the Batch 3 ships (Cornwall, etc.) before being temporarily abandoned with the Type 23 class, named after Dukedoms (Norfolk, Lancaster, etc.). The Royal Navy's latest escort class – the Type 45 or Daring class – have re-introduced the alphabetical progression, using destroyer names from the 1930s and 1950s.

The names selected for the four Batch 3 ships were a mixture: two, Cornwall and Cumberland, revived County-class names previously carried both by First World War-era Monmouth-class armoured cruisers, and by Second World War-era County-class heavy cruisers. The other Batch 3s, Chatham and Campbeltown, were Town names, the former reviving a 1911 Town-class light cruiser name, and the latter commemorating HMS Campbeltown famous for participation in the St Nazaire Raid in 1942; the name for HMS Chatham was selected as a salute to the Medway town, where the Chatham Dockyard, established in 1570, had closed in 1984.

== Design ==
The Type 22 was designed to be a specialist anti-submarine warfare vessel as part of the Royal Navy's contribution to NATO. During Royal Navy service the ships evolved into general purpose frigates with weapons for use against other surface ships, aircraft and submarines. They were built in three batches giving rise to three sub-classes, the first Broadsword of four ships, the second Boxer of six ships and the third and final, Cornwall of four ships. During their Royal Navy service the ships had enhanced command, control and co-ordination facilities that resulted in their often being used as flagships on deployments.

The four Broadswords were sold to Brazil in the mid-1990s. In the early 2000s Romania acquired and modernised two of the Batch 2 ships (without acquiring the SeaWolf or Exocet missiles), while a third was purchased by Chile.

== Development ==
Following the cancellation of the aircraft carrier programme CVA-01 in 1966, the Royal Navy undertook a reappraisal of the surface fleet, and concluded that the following five new ship types were required:

- A cruiser-type ship to operate large ASW helicopters (this requirement eventually led to the Invincible-class aircraft carriers);
- An air defence destroyer smaller and cheaper than the County class (this resulted in the Type 42 programme);
- A missile-armed frigate as an eventual successor to the Type 12 Leander class (this requirement led to the Type 22);
- A cheap patrol frigate (this requirement led to the Type 21); and
- A dual-role mine countermeasures vessel successor to the Ton class (this resulted in the Hunt class)

Of these, the air defence destroyer appeared to have been given highest priority, the imperative being to get Sea Dart to sea in numbers to replace the air defence capability which would be lost with the retirement of the carrier fleet.

Due to the workload of the Admiralty design department in the 1960s, a private design (Type 21) was purchased as an interim stop-gap whilst the Type 22 was under development. Priority was given to the Type 21 and the urgently needed Type 42 projects.

The Type 22 design was protracted by attempts to produce a common Anglo-Dutch design. The Dutch were participating in the NATO Sea Sparrow Project, whilst the RN was developing Seawolf. Plus, the use of Rolls-Royce gas turbines and David Brown gearboxes would have led an imbalance in the economic benefit to each country. So agreement could not be met.

The Type 22 was designed by the Royal Corps of Naval Constructors. Concept designs were developed by Jack Daniel's Forward Design Group in the late 1960s as an ASW frigate replacement for the Leander-class. Full COGOG gas turbine drive was chosen, with reduced vibration and underwater noise. Extensive helicopter facilities were included. Seawolf air defence missile system was selected. The final length was set to the maximum compatible with the Devonport Frigate Refit Complex, to provide good seakeeping. Alan Creighton RCNC was the MoD Project Leader and worked with Yarrows monitoring progress, costs and weight.

The first Type 22 order was placed in 1972 with Yarrow Shipbuilders; Yarrow undertook much of the detailed design work whilst overall responsibility remained with the Ship Department at Bath.

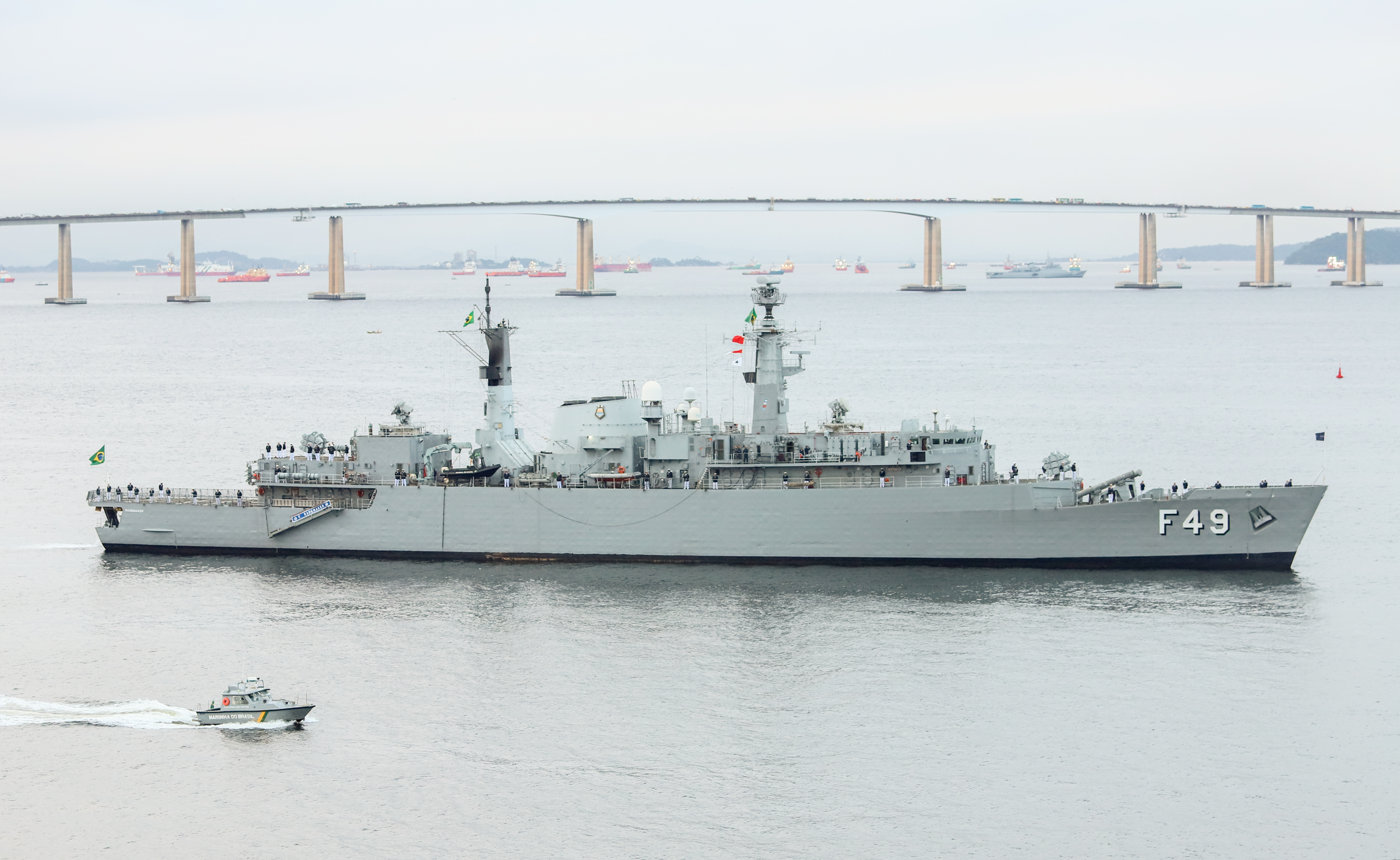
Rademaker, formerly Battleaxe, a Type 22 frigate of the Brazilian Navy

=== Batch 1 ===
The length of the first four Type 22s was dictated by the dimensions of the undercover Frigate Refit Complex at Devonport Dockyard. The ships would be powered by a combination of Olympus and Tyne gas turbines in a COGOG (combined gas turbine or gas turbine) arrangement. Machinery spaces were sited as far aft as possible to minimise shaft lengths. The after configuration was dictated by the requirement for a large hangar and a full-width flight deck. Electrical power was provided by GEC generators powered by four Paxman Ventura 16YJCAZ diesel engines, each rated at 1MW.

Weapons fit was determined by the primary ASW role combined with a perceived need for a general purpose capability. The principal ASW weapons systems were the ship's Westland Lynx helicopter and triple torpedo tubes (STWS), with the large Type 2016 sonar a key part of the sensor fit. Air defence was provided in the form of two 'six-pack' launchers for the Seawolf (GWS 25) point-defence missile system. Surface warfare requirements were met by the provision of four Exocet missile launchers, the standard RN fit at that time. A pair of Bofors 40 mm L/60 guns were fitted in the first batch for patrolling and "junk-busting" on summer Indian Ocean deployments, but proved an impediment in the Falklands War where Type 22 captains considered they interfered with concentrating on the Seawolf setup.

The Broadsword design was unique to the Royal Navy in lacking a main gun armament. Although some of the Leander-class frigates had lost their main gun armament during upgrades, Broadsword was the first to be designed from the beginning without a large-calibre gun turret.

Ordering of Type 22s proceeded slowly, in part because of the comparatively high unit cost of the ships. The unit cost of the last Type 12Ms (Rothesay class) had been about £10m; Type 21s cost around £20m each; when the first Type 22s were ordered, unit costs were estimated at £30m though, by the time that the first ship (Broadsword) commissioned in 1979, inflation had driven this figure up to £68m, which was far higher than the cost of the contemporary Type 42s (HMS Glasgow, also commissioned in 1979, cost £40m).

=== Batch 2 ===
After the first four ("Batch I") ships, the design was "stretched", with the Devonport Frigate Refit Complex docks lengthened to accommodate them. Visually, and in addition to the increase in length, the biggest difference was the sharply raked stem, usually indicative of bow sonar though none of the Batch II ships was thus fitted. An important addition to the Batch II group was a new computer assisted command system (CACS-1), replacing the CAAIS fitted to the Batch I ships. This could track up to 500 targets, including those detected by the ships' new Type 2031Z passive towed array sonar and ESM. The most significant change in this group of six Type 22 frigates is much more sophisticated electronic warfare systems, particularly the Classic Outboard system for the intercept of Soviet naval and submarine communications. This very sophisticated and specialised versions of the Type 22 were specifically approved by the Prime Minister James Callaghan. The larger hull also improved sea keeping, but never achieved the expected quietness with towed arrays due to failure to raft mount the diesel generators. This would be important in operations in the Greenland-Iceland-UK gap where the ships were expected to play an important role in preventing and monitoring the passage of Soviet naval units at a critical stage of the Cold War. A revised machinery installation was adopted for HMS Brave, with Rolls-Royce Spey turbines replacing the previous Rolls-Royce Olympus in a Combination Of Gas turbine Or Gas turbine (COGOG) arrangement. Though this reverted to the previous Olympus / Tyne COGOG arrangement for the next three batch II ships, the future machinery arrangement adopted for the batch III vessels would be Combination of Gas turbine And Gas turbine (COGAG) utilising the Spey / Tyne arrangement as fitted in HMS Brave. Further improvements from HMS Brave onwards included a taller helicopter hangar, giving the ships the ability to carry a single Westland Sea King or EH101 Merlin instead of two Lynx. By 1982, the quoted unit cost of a Type 22 had risen to £127m.

Broadsword and Brilliant participated in the Falklands War and replacements for the ships lost in the South Atlantic were all Type 22s.

=== Batch 3 ===
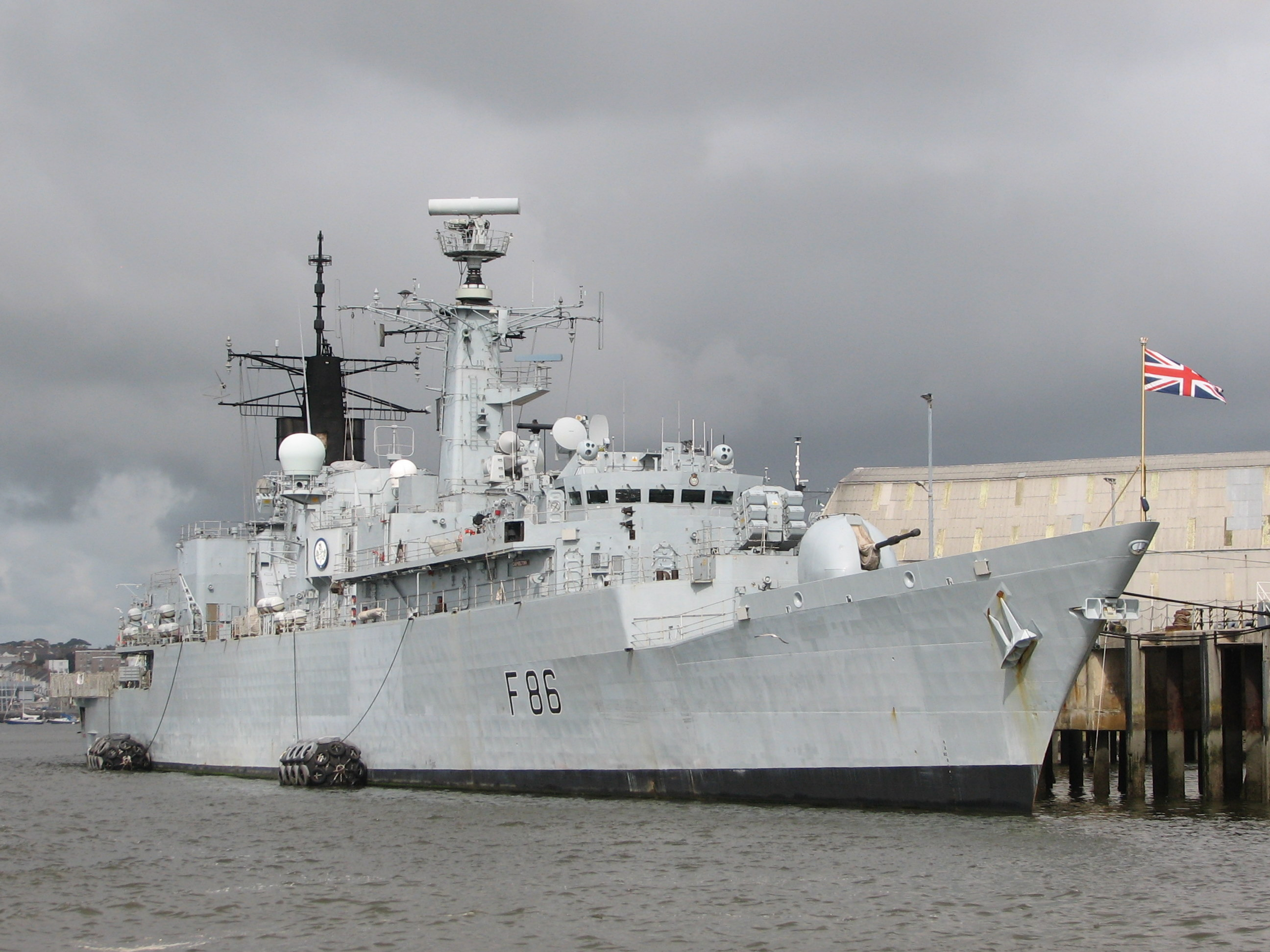
HMS Campbeltown, displaying some of the external differences of the Batch 3 units; the 4.5-inch gun instead of Exocet launchers, and the Goalkeeper CIWS visible in front of the foremast.

The four Batch III ships – Cornwall, Cumberland, Campbeltown and Chatham – were completed to a revised design which reflected lessons learned in the Falklands War. The weapons fit was changed, becoming more optimised for a general warfare role. The only major weapon systems shared with the previous vessels were the pair of six-cell Seawolf launchers and the torpedo tubes. The ships were fitted with a 4.5-inch (113 mm) Mk.8 gun, primarily to provide naval gunfire support for forces on land. Exocet was replaced by the superior Harpoon with eight GWS 60 missile launchers fitted laterally abaft the bridge, and each ship carried a 30 mm Goalkeeper CIWS to provide last-ditch defence against anti-ship missiles.

Electrical power in Batch 3 ships is provided by Paxman Valenta 12RPA200 diesel engines, replacing the Ventura engines used on earlier ships.

In their final form, the Type 22s were the largest frigates built to date for the Royal Navy. Reflecting this, Type 22s were often deployed as flagships for NATO Task Groups.

=== Specifications ===
	Batch 1	Batch 2	Batch 3
Displacement	4,400 tons	4,800 tons	5,300 tons
Dimensions	131 metres (430 ft) length 14.8 metres (49 ft) beam 6.1 metres (20 ft) draught	146.5 metres (481 ft) length 14.8 metres (49 ft) beam 6.4 metres (21 ft) draught	148.1 metres (486 ft) length 14.8 metres (49 ft) beam 6.4 metres (21 ft) draught
Armament	4 × single MM38 Exocet SSM; 2 × sextuple GWS25 Seawolf SAM; 2 × twin Oerlikon 30 mm/75 2 × single Oerlikon/BMARC 20 mm GAM-B01; 2 × triple STWS Mk.2 torpedo tubes	4 × single MM38 Exocet SSM; 2 × sextuple GWS25 Seawolf SAM; 2 × twin Oerlikon 30 mm/75 Oerlikon/BMARC 20 mm GAM-B01; 2 × triple STWS Mk.2 torpedo tubes	2 × quadruple RGM-84 Harpoon SSM; 2 × sextuple GWS25 Seawolf SAM; 1 × 30 mm Goalkeeper CIWS; 1 × single 4.5-inch/55 Mk.8; 2 × triple STWS Mk.2 torpedo tubes
Propulsion	2 × Rolls-Royce Olympus TM3B; 2 × Rolls-Royce Tyne RM1C	2 × Rolls-Royce Olympus TM3B (Note: Brave was fitted with 2 × Rolls-Royce Spey SM1C in place of the Olympus TM3B); 2 × Rolls-Royce Tyne RM1C	2 × Rolls-Royce Spey SM1A; 2 × Rolls-Royce Tyne RM3C
Speed	30 knots		

== Construction and running costs ==
=== Construction programme ===
Pennant	Name	(a) Hull builder	Ordered	Laid down	Launched	Accepted into service (Note: The term used in Navy Estimates and Defence Estimates is "accepted into service". Hansard has used the term "acceptance date". Marriott in his books uses the term "completed", as does Jane's Fighting Ships. These terms all mean the same thing: the date the Navy accepts the vessel from the builder. This date is important because maintenance cycles, etc. are generally calculated from the acceptance date.)	Commissioned	Est. building cost
Batch 1
F88	Broadsword	Yarrow, Glasgow	8 February 1974	7 February 1975	12 May 1976	21 February 1979	4 May 1979	£68.6M
F89	Battleaxe	Yarrow, Glasgow	5 September 1975	4 February 1976	18 May 1977	20 December 1979	28 March 1980	£69.2M
F90	Brilliant	Yarrow, Glasgow	7 September 1976	25 March 1977	15 December 1978	10 April 1981	15 May 1981	£102.2M
F91	Brazen	Yarrow, Glasgow	21 October 1977	18 August 1978	4 March 1980	11 June 1982	2 July 1982	£112M
Batch 2
F92	Boxer	Yarrow, Glasgow	25 April 1979	1 November 1979	17 June 1981	23 September 1983	22 December 1983	£147M
F93	Beaver	Yarrow, Glasgow	25 April 1979	20 June 1980	8 May 1982	18 July 1984	13 December 1984	£148M
F94	Brave	Yarrow, Glasgow	27 August 1981	24 May 1982	19 November 1983	21 February 1986	4 July 1986	£166M
F95	London (ex-Bloodhound)	Yarrow, Glasgow	23 February 1982	7 February 1983	27 October 1984	6 February 1987	5 June 1987	£159M
F96	Sheffield (ex-Bruiser)	Swan Hunter, Wallsend.	2 July 1982	29 March 1984	26 March 1986	25 March 1988	26 July 1988	£151M
F98	Coventry (ex-Boadicea)	Swan Hunter, Wallsend.	14 December 1982	29 March 1984	8 April 1986	1 July 1988	14 October 1988	£147M
Batch 3
F99	Cornwall	Yarrow, Glasgow	14 December 1982	19 September 1983	14 October 1985	19 February 1988	23 April 1988	£131.05M
F85	Cumberland	Yarrow, Glasgow	27 October 1984	12 October 1984	21 June 1986	18 November 1988	10 June 1989	£141.17M
F86	Campbeltown	Cammell Laird, Birkenhead	January 1985	4 December 1985	7 October 1987	24 February 1989	27 May 1989	£161.97M
F87	Chatham	Swan Hunter, Wallsend.	28 January 1985	12 May 1986	20 January 1988	4 May 1990	4 May 1990	£175.28M

On 11 January 1985, Mr. Dalyell asked the Secretary of State for Defence: "what is the latest cost estimate of a type 22 frigate, with stores, spare parts and ammunition." The Secretary of State for Defence, Mr. Lee, replied: "The average cost of a batch III type 22 frigate is currently estimated at £140 million at 1984–85 prices. The cost of embarked helicopters, the first outfit of stores, spare parts and ammunition are estimated at £18 million at the same price level."

=== Running costs ===
Date	Running cost	What is included	Citation
1981–82	£11.0 million	Average annual running cost of Type 22s at average 1981–82 prices and including associated aircraft costs but excluding the costs of major refits.	
1985–86	£12 million	The average cost of running and maintaining a type 22 frigate for one year.	
1987–88	£4.8 million	The average annual operating costs, at financial year 1987–88 prices of a type 22 frigate. These costs include personnel, fuel, spares and so on, and administrative support services, but exclude new construction, capital equipment, and refit-repair costs.	
2001–02	£11.9 million	Type 22 Batch 3 frigate, average annual operating costs, based on historic costs over each full financial year. The figures include manpower, maintenance, fuel, stores and other costs (such as harbour dues), but exclude depreciation and cost of capital.	
2002–03	£13.1 million	Type 22 Batch 3 frigate, average annual operating costs, based on historic costs over each full financial year. The figures include manpower, maintenance, fuel, stores and other costs (such as harbour dues), but exclude depreciation and cost of capital.	
2007–08	£32.45 million	"The annual operating cost for the Type 22 Class of Frigates, which comprises four ships, is £129.8M. This is based on information primarily from Financial Year 07/08 the last year for which this information is available, and includes typical day-to-day costs such as fuel and manpower and general support costs covering maintenance, repair and equipment spares. Costs for equipment spares are also included, although these are based on Financial Year 08/09 information as this is the most recent information available. Costs for weapon system support are not included as they could only be provided at disproportionate cost."	
2009–10	£32.725 million	"The average running cost per class... Type 22 is £130.9 million... These figures, based on the expenditure incurred by the Ministry of Defence in 2009–10, include maintenance, safety certification, military upgrades, manpower, inventory, satellite communication, fuel costs and depreciation.".	
2010–11	£16 million	"The projected operating cost for HMS Cumberland in financial year 2010–11, based on actual costs to February 2011 and those estimated for the remainder of the financial year".	

== Availability ==
In February 1998, in response to a written question in parliament by Mike Hancock, the Minister of State for the Armed Forces, Dr John Reid said: "Type 22 frigates achieved approximately 82 to 86 per cent. average availability for operational service in each of the last five years. This discounts time spent in planned maintenance."

== Ships – disposal and current state ==
Pennant	Name	Commissioned by RN	Disposal by RN	Sale contract signed	Re-commissioned new owner	Home port	Status
Batch 1
F88	Broadsword	3 May 1979	30 June 1995 to Brazil.	18 November 1994	30 June 1995	Rio de Janeiro	Brazilian Greenhalgh (F46), decommissioned 10 August 2021. Sunk as target 2024.
F89	Battleaxe	28 March 1980	30 April 1997 to Brazil.	18 November 1994	30 April 1997		Active in Brazil as Rademaker (F49).
F90	Brilliant	15 May 1981	30 August 1996 to Brazil.	18 November 1994	31 August 1996		Brazilian Dodsworth (F47). Scrapped 2012.
F91	Brazen	2 July 1982	30 August 1996 to Brazil.	18 November 1994	31 August 1996		Brazilian Bosísio (F48). Retired September 2015. Sunk as target 2017.
Batch 2
F92	Boxer	22 December 1983	4 August 1999 decommissioned. 1999 deleted.				Sunk as target in 2004.
F93	Beaver	13 December 1984	1 May 1999 decommissioned. 1999 deleted.	21 February 2001 for scrap.			Scrapped 2001
F94	Brave	4 July 1986	23 March 1999 decommissioned. 1999 deleted.				Sunk as target in August 2004 by the submarine HMS Sceptre and the frigate HMS Argyll.
F95	London	5 June 1987	14 January 1999 decommissioned. 1999 deleted.	14 January 2003 to Romania.	21 April 2005		Active in Romania as Regina Maria (F222)
F96	Sheffield	26 July 1988	15 November 2002 decommissioned.	April 2003 to Chile.	5 September 2003	Valparaíso	Active in Chile as Almirante Williams (FF-19)
F98	Coventry	14 October 1988	December 2001 decommissioned. 2001 deleted.	14 January 2003 to Romania.	9 September 2004		Active in Romania as Regele Ferdinand (F221)
Batch 3
F99	Cornwall	23 April 1988	Decommissioned 30 June 2011	July 2013 for scrap.			Scrapped 2013
F85	Cumberland	10 June 1989	Decommissioned 23 June 2011	July 2013 for scrap.			Scrapped
F86	Campbeltown	27 May 1989	Decommissioned April 2011	July 2013 for scrap.			Scrapped 2013
F87	Chatham	4 May 1990	Decommissioned 9 February 2011	July 2013 for scrap.			Scrapped

In May 2000, the Secretary of State for Defence was asked the planned service life of London, Beaver, Boxer, and Brave and the forecast date for withdrawal from Royal Navy service, "prior to the decision in the Strategic Defence Review to dispose of them." The Minister of State for the Armed Forces, John Spellar, replied in a written answer: "The planned service for each ship was 18 years" and The additional information is given in the table." Note that the 18 years was dated from the date of acceptance, not the date first commissioned.

Ship	Pre-SDR date for withdrawal
HMS Boxer	31 January 2002
HMS Beaver	31 December 2002
HMS Brave	29 February 2004
HMS London	28 February 2005

In July 2000, the Secretary of State for Defence was asked when he planned to withdraw the remaining Type 22 Batch II frigates from service. The Minister of State for the Armed Forces, John Spellar, replied that HMS Sheffield would be withdrawn in 2012 and superseded by a Type 45 destroyer, Coventry in 2001 superseded by HMS St. Albans, a Type 23 frigate

== See also ==
- List of frigate classes in service
- List of frigate classes by country

Equivalent frigates of the same era

- Tourville class
- Tromp class
- Baleares class
- Suffren class
- Oliver Hazard Perry class

== Bibliography ==
- Marriott, Leo (1986), Type 22, Modern Combat Ships 4, Ian Allan, ISBN 0-7110-1593-7
