= HMS Antelope (F170) =

1975 Type 21 or Amazon-class frigate of the Royal Navy

Coordinates: 51°33′3″S 59°3′30″W

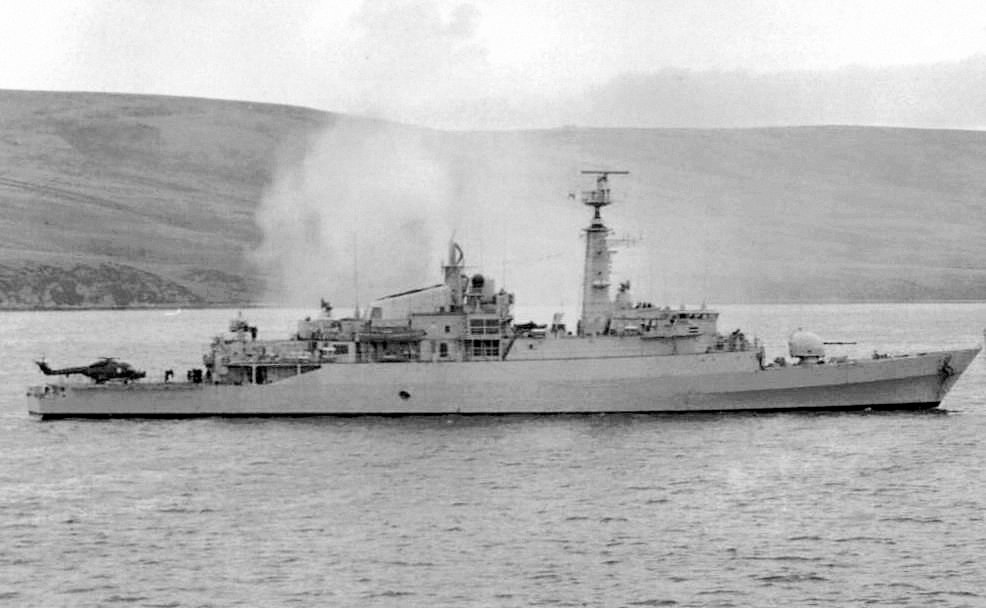
- HMS Antelope at San Carlos Water on 23 May 1982. Note damaged mast (mostly hidden by smoke) and bomb entry hole on hull below funnel.

History

United Kingdom
- Name: HMS Antelope
- Builder: Vosper Thornycroft
- Laid down: 23 March 1971
- Launched: 16 March 1972
- Commissioned: 19 July 1975
- Motto: "Audax et vigilans"
- Fate: Sunk 23 May 1982

General characteristics
- Class & type: Type 21 frigate
- Displacement: 3,250 tons full load
- Length: 384 feet (117 metres)
- Beam: 41 3/4 feet (12.7 metres)
- Draught: 19 1/2 feet (5.9 metres)
- Propulsion: 2 × Rolls-Royce Olympus; 2 × Rolls-Royce Tyne
- Speed: 32 knots (59 km/h; 37 mph)
- Range: 4,000 nmi (7,400 km; 4,600 mi) at 17 kn (31 km/h; 20 mph); 1,200 nmi (2,200 km; 1,400 mi) at 30 kn (56 km/h; 35 mph)
- Complement: 177 crew
- Armament: 1 × 4.5-inch Mark 8 naval gun; 2 × Oerlikon 20 mm cannon; 1 × quadruple Seacat missiles; 2 × triple ASW torpedo tubes; 2 × Corvus Chaff launchers; 1 × Type 182 towed decoy
- Aircraft carried: 1 × Westland Wasp; 1 × Westland Lynx (refitted)

HMS Antelope was a Type 21 frigate of the Royal Navy that saw service in the Falklands War and was sunk by Argentinian aircraft.

== Construction and commissioning ==
Her keel was laid down 23 March 1971 by Vosper Thornycroft in Woolston, Southampton, England.

Initial budget costs for this class were £3.5 million, with final costs exceeding £14 million. She was commissioned on 17 July 1975, and was the only unit of the class never to be fitted with Exocet launchers.

In 1977, she attended the fleet review for the Silver Jubilee of Elizabeth II. At this time, she was part of the 7th Frigate Squadron.

== Falklands War ==
=== Bombing ===
Antelope took part in the Falklands War, arriving in the area of operations on 21 May 1982. Two days later, while on air defence duty at the entrance to San Carlos Water, protecting the beachhead established two days before, she came under attack by four Argentinian A-4B Skyhawks of Grupo 5. The first pair attacked from astern, with the flight leader breaking off his attack after one of Antelope's Seacat missiles exploded under the port wing of his aircraft.

The pilot, Captain Pablo Carballo, managed to nurse his aircraft back to Rio Gallegos. The second aircraft on this flight pressed home his bomb run and put a 1,000-pound bomb in Antelope's starboard side, killing one crewman, Steward Mark R. Stephens. The bomb did not explode and the Argentinian aircraft was damaged by small arms fire. The second pair of Skyhawks attacked minutes later from the starboard quarter. During this attack, one of the Argentinian jets, piloted by First Lieutenant Luciano Guadagnini, was hit by the ship's Oerlikon 20 mm cannon before colliding with Antelope's main mast and disintegrating. Guadagnini had released the bombs before being brought down, and one bomb penetrated Antelope's hull amidships. However, like the first bomb that hit the ship, it failed to explode.

Antelope fired a Seacat at what she believed to be a fifth attacker, but this was Captain Carballo, trying to establish if his aircraft was fit to fly. The missile missed, but passed less than 10 metres (33 ft) from Carballo's cockpit.

=== Unexploded ordnance ===
After initial damage control efforts, Antelope proceeded to more sheltered waters so that two bomb disposal technicians from the Royal Engineers could come aboard and attempt to defuse the two unexploded bombs. One of the bombs was inaccessible because of wreckage; the other had been damaged and was thought to be in a particularly dangerous condition. Three attempts by the bomb disposal team to withdraw the fuse of this bomb by remote means failed.

=== Sinking ===
A fourth attempt using a small explosive charge detonated the bomb, killing Staff Sergeant James Prescott instantly and removing an arm of Warrant Officer John Phillips, the other member of the bomb disposal team.

The ship was torn open from waterline to funnel, with the blast starting major fires in both engine rooms, which spread very quickly. The starboard fire main was fractured, the ship lost all electrical power, and the commanding officer, Commander Nick Tobin, gave the order to abandon ship. Tobin was the last person to leave the ship; about five minutes after his departure, the missile magazines began exploding.

Explosions continued throughout the night. The following day Antelope was still afloat, but her keel had broken and her superstructure melted into a heap of twisted metal. Antelope broke in half and sank that day. TV and still pictures of Antelope's demise became some of the iconic images of the Falklands War and appear repeatedly in histories of the event.

=== Aftermath ===
Corporal Alan White received a commendation from the Task Force Commander, Admiral Sir John Fieldhouse, for his part in rescuing 41 crew from Antelope using a Mark 2 LCVP, one of four carried by the assault ship Fearless. The landing craft, Foxtrot 7, is now located in the Royal Marines Museum in Portsmouth, with detailed accounts from Corporal Alan White of the missions he took part in, including the landings at San Carlos.

In January 2002, a diving team from the frigate Montrose replaced the naval ensign on Antelope. The wreck is designated as a prohibited area under the Falkland Islands Protection of Wrecks Act.
