= Type 21 frigate =

Class of general purpose frigates built for Royal Navy

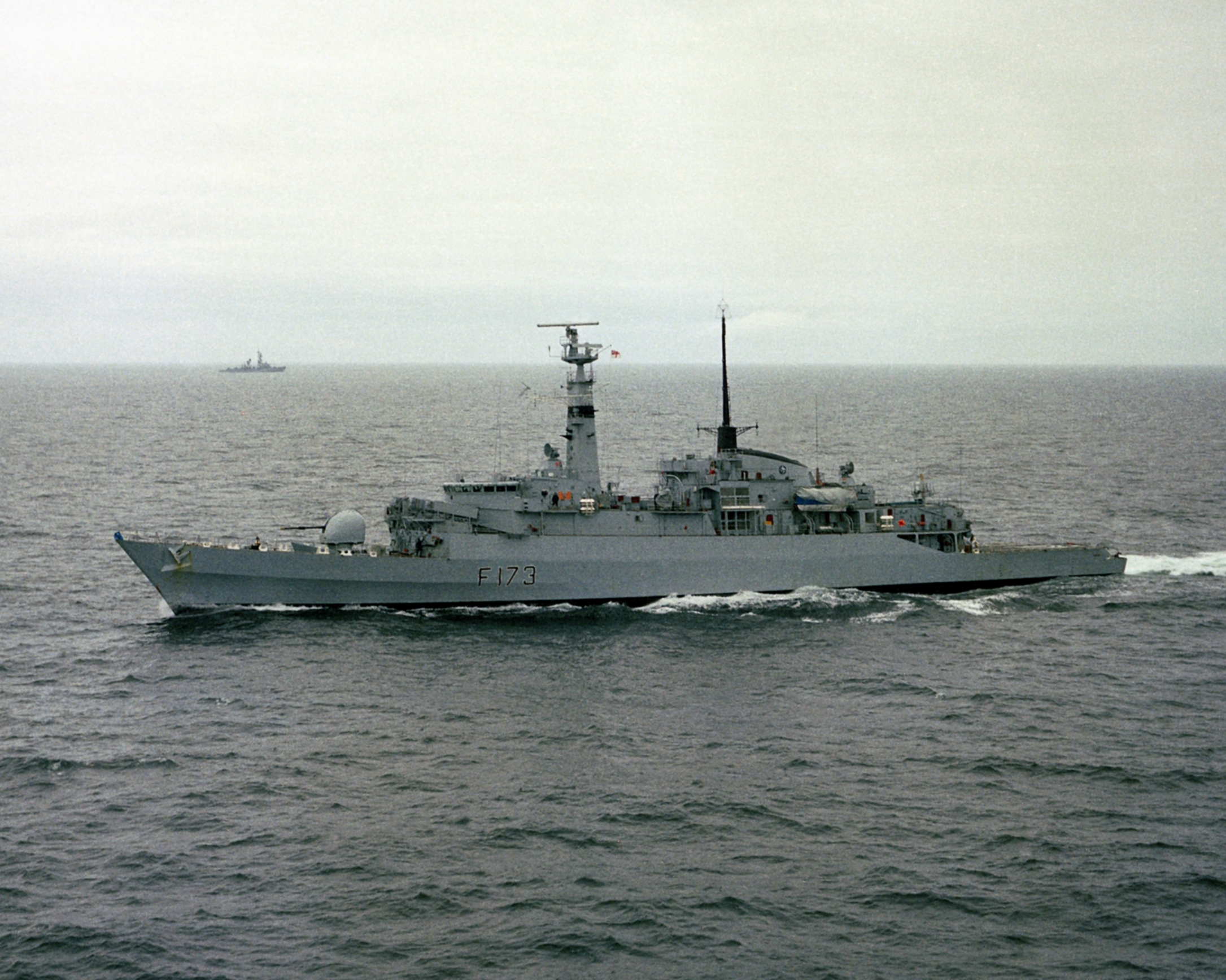
- The Royal Navy frigate HMS Arrow underway (circa 1982)

Class overview
- Name: Type 21 Amazon
- Builders: Yarrow Shipbuilders, Vosper Thornycroft
- Operators: Royal Navy (historical); Pakistan Navy
- Preceded by: Type 12I Leander
- Succeeded by: Type 22 Broadsword
- Subclasses: Niteroi class; Alvand class; Tariq class
- Built: 6 November 1969-20 November 1975
- In commission: 11 May 1974
- Completed: 8
- Active: 0
- Lost: 2
- Retired: 6
- Preserved: 1 (planned)

General characteristics
- Type: Frigate
- Displacement: As built: 2,750 tons (standard); 3,250 tons (full load); After strengthening: 2,860 tons (standard); 3,360 tons (full load)
- Length: 360 ft (110 m) (waterline); 384 ft (117 m) (overall)
- Beam: 41.8 ft (12.7 m)
- Draught: 19 ft (5.8 m)
- Propulsion: COGOG on 2 shafts; 2 × Tyne cruise turbines: 8,500 shp (6,300 kW); 2 × Olympus boost turbines: 50,000 shp (37,000 kW)
- Speed: 32 knots (59 km/h; 37 mph) 37 knots burst speed (Olympus); 18 knots (33 km/h; 21 mph) (Tyne)
- Range: 4,000 nmi (7,400 km; 4,600 mi) at 17 knots (31 km/h; 20 mph); 3,500 nmi (6,500 km; 4,000 mi) at 18 knots (33 km/h; 21 mph); 1,200 nmi (2,200 km; 1,400 mi) at 30 knots (56 km/h; 35 mph)
- Complement: 13 officers, 164 ratings
- Sensors & processing systems: 1 × Radar Type 992Q low-level search; 1 × Radar Type 978 navigation; 2 × Radar Type 912 fire-control; Sonar Type 184M and 162M
- Armament: 1 × 4.5 in (114 mm) Vickers Mark 8 gun; 2 × 20 mm Oerlikon guns (later 4); 1 × 4-rail launcher for GWS-24 Sea Cat; 2 × 8-barrelled Knebworth Corvus countermeasures launchers; Later additions: 4 × launchers for MM38 Exocet surface-surface missiles; 2 × 12.75 in (324 mm) 3-tube STWS-1 anti-submarine torpedo launchers; Pakistani modifications: TKWA/MASS (Multi Ammunition Softkill System); 2 x 4-cell Harpoon missile launchers (3 ships); or; 1 x 6-cell LY-60N Hunting Eagle SAM launcher (3 ships); 1 × Vulcan Phalanx 20mm CIWS
- Aircraft carried: 1 × Wasp or Lynx
- Aviation facilities: Flight deck and hangar

The Type 21 frigate, or Amazon-class frigate, was a British Royal Navy general-purpose escort that was designed in the late 1960s, built in the 1970s, and that served into the 1990s.

== Development ==
In the mid-1960s, the Royal Navy (RN) had a requirement for a replacement for the diesel-powered Leopard-class (Type 41) anti-aircraft frigates and Salisbury-class (Type 61) air direction frigates. While the Royal Navy's warships were traditionally designed by the Ministry of Defence's Ship Department based at Bath, private shipyards (in particular Vosper Thorneycroft) campaigned for the right to design and build a ship to meet this requirement. Vospers claimed that, by ignoring what they claimed to be the conservative design practices followed by the MoD team at Bath, they could deliver the new frigate at a significantly lower price (£3.5 million compared with the £5 million price of the contemporary Leander class), while being attractive to export customers.

The class was ordered under political and Treasury pressure for a relatively cheap, yet modern, general purpose escort vessel which would be attractive to governments and officers of South America and Australasia: the traditional export markets of British shipyards. It was also envisaged as an out-of-area RN gunboat that would retain UK presence in those areas, as well as the Caribbean and the Persian Gulf; essentially replacing the diesel-powered Type 41s and Type 61s and the combined steam and gas-powered Tribal-class frigate (Type 81) frigates with smaller crewed vessels. The RN staff disliked the idea and would have preferred to continue to develop steam types – in the RN's case, the Type 12I Leander class, which was regarded as a successful and quiet anti-submarine hunter, but was seen by the politicians as dated and by the Treasury and export-oriented shipyards as too expensive to market.

The development of Vosper's own export designs, the Mk 5 for Iran and the Mk 7 for Libya, increased the pressure on the Admiralty to accept this line of naval development, which seemed to offer a cheap export frigate with a range of 6,000 nautical miles (11,000 km; 6,900 mi), a top speed of 37 knots (69 km/h; 43 mph), a superficially good armament of the new Mark 8 4.5-inch (113 mm) gun, facilities for a Westland Wasp helicopter, anti-ship missiles and two triple lightweight Seacat missile launchers. When plans for the new Libyan frigate Dat Assawari were finalised in 1968, the Admiralty board accepted that its paper specifications were unanswerable and they would have to allow the shipyards to develop a low cost fill in anti-submarine warfare and general purpose version for the RN that would be stretched and fully gas turbine-powered rather than combined diesel and gas like the Mk 5 and Mk 7. In reality, it was a much more difficult design, with the lack of heavy propulsion machinery low in the hull to balance the top weight of bulky superstructure. The fitting of Tyne gas turbines for cruising, instead of the diesels used in the Iranian and Libyan versions, meant fuel consumption and cost would be high, which was a tremendous problem for the Royal Navy in the early 1980s when the austerity of early Thatcherism cut the Royal Navy fuel allowance and meant that most frigates spent more time tied up, rather than at sea in 1980–1981; and despite the smaller crew, running costs of the Type 21 were ten percent higher than those of the Leanders.

The Type 21 would provide the shipyards with experience in building fully gas turbine powered ships and provide them with useful work for the shipyards while the Type 42-class destroyer and Type 22-class frigate would not be ready until the mid-to-late 1970s. As the Admiralty design board were busy with the latter, the Type 21 project was given to the private shipyards of Vosper Thornycroft and Yarrow. The unmistakably yacht-like and rakish lines were indicative of their commercial design.

At one stage, it was hoped to build a joint design that would meet both the Royal Navy's requirement for a low-cost Patrol Frigate and Australia's General Purpose Escort requirement, with discussions between the two navies beginning in 1967, with Australia, who hoped to build a series of Type 21s in Australian shipyards, part-funding design work on the proposal. The requirements of the two navies were significantly different, with Australia wanting higher speeds (35 knots (65 km/h; 40 mph) rather than the 32-knot (59 km/h; 37 mph) requirement of the Royal Navy) and American armament (including Sea Sparrow missiles and a 5-inch (127 mm) Mark 45 gun). Australia pulled out of the project in November 1968, later refining its requirements into the Australian light destroyer project. After the Royal Australian Navy (RAN) DDL was cancelled the RAN and Royal New Zealand Navy (RNZN) reconsidered the Type 21 but still found it too expensive, and considered the UK gun and radar inferior to the United States Navy options. Australia ordered the US Oliver Hazard Perry-class design in 1976.

A contract for detailed design of the new frigate to meet Royal Navy requirements and to build the first example was placed in March 1969. By this time cost had crept up to £7.3 million, more than Leander-class frigates.

Attempts continued to sell frigates derived from the Type 21 to export customers, including Argentina. A broad-beam derivative armed with vertical-launch Sea Wolf surface-to-air missiles was offered to Pakistan in 1985.

The first of the eight built, Amazon, entered service in May 1974.

== Design ==
These ships were the Royal Navy's first privately designed warships for many years. They were also the first design to enter service with the Royal Navy to be solely powered by gas-turbine engines, with two Rolls-Royce Tynes for cruising and two Rolls-Royce Olympus for high speeds arranged in a combined gas or gas (COGOG) arrangement. The design had a large superstructure in relation to the volume of the main hull (below No 1 Deck) and made use of large amounts of aluminium alloy in the superstructure with the aim of reducing the topweight. However the design team miscalculated the weight of the ‘Outfit’ in and on the superstructure. The height of the superstructure exacerbated the error. Worries later surfaced about aluminium's resilience to fire, particularly following a major fire on Amazon in 1977 during which aluminium ladders distorted, preventing fire-fighting teams from reaching the blaze, and its ability to withstand blast damage. Later British warships avoided aluminium for superstructure and load-bearing structure, and reverted to steel.

As delivered, the Type 21s were armed with a single 4.5 inch Mark 8 naval gun forward, and a four-round launcher for the SeaCat surface-to-air missile aft. The Italian Selenia Orion-10X lightweight fire control radar was adopted to control both the gun and the SeaCat missile (as the GWS-24 system) in an effort to save weight. A Type 992Q air/surface radar was fitted, but a long-range air-search radar was not provided. A hangar and flight deck were provided for a single helicopter, at first the Westland Wasp. The CAAIS was provided to integrate the ship's weapons and sensor systems and provide the crew with all the relevant information they required to fight the ship, as and when they needed it.

In terms of automation, systems integration and habitability, they were well in advance of many of the ships that they replaced, such as the Tribal-class frigate and Type 12M Rothesay-class frigate - the latter's basic design could be traced back to 1945.

=== Modifications ===
MoD discovered the error in weight and Vertical Centre of Gravity about 6 months after the first of class was launched. When they entered service, the Type 21s were criticised for being under-armed in relation to their size and cost. A programme was put in hand to increase their firepower by fitting four French-built MM38 Exocet anti-ship missiles. These were sited in front of the bridge screen aft of the forecastle, displacing the Corvus countermeasure launchers to amidships. This improvement was quickly carried out to all ships of the class during their build period except Amazon, Antelope and Ambuscade; Amazon and Ambuscade were fitted with Exocet in 1984/85. The Exocets were located in two pairs and the missiles would deploy across the ship and clear the opposite side of the vessel to their launchers in flight.

The design error in weight and stability had more than wiped out the margins that had been intended for replacing Seacat by the more capable Seawolf and the Type 2016 bow sonar. The ships lacked the margins of weight and space customary to in-house Royal Navy warship designs for major modernization.

Five modernisation proposals for the Type 21s were considered by the Royal Navy but rejected by 1979, when it was 'reluctantly' decided not to modernize the class, and it was estimated that they would be laid up by 1988.

The small Wasp helicopter was replaced by the vastly more capable Westland Lynx when it became available. Compared to the Wasp, the Lynx was faster and carried its own sensors, plus more and better weapons. As and when ships came in for refit, ship-launched anti-submarine torpedoes were also fitted (though not in Amazon), in the form of two STWS-1 triple-tube launchers capable of firing United States USN/NATO-standard Mark 44 or Mark 46 torpedoes. After the Falklands War, two more 20 mm Oerlikon guns were mounted on some ships of the class, one each side of the hangar, to provide extra close-in armament. The first of these guns was actually salvaged from the wreck of Antelope by divers, and was fitted to Avenger, where it carried the slogan 'Antelope's Avenger' on its gunshield.

=== Analysis ===
Criticism was levelled at the performance of the type in the Falklands conflict. The ships developed cracks in their decks due to the different strength and fatigue properties of steel and aluminium. This was a vulnerability particularly demonstrated under the severe weather conditions that they encountered in the South Atlantic. Steel reinforcing plates were eventually fitted down the sides of the ships and on No. 1 Deck. Although built to a tight budget and design specification (and carrying insufficient anti-aircraft weaponry) they distinguished themselves in a theatre for which they had not been designed. As shore bombardment platforms and in lethal, accurate gunfire support for the Royal Marines and British Army landing at San Carlos, they were superb, pinning down any possibility of Argentine army counterattack, but they remained shallow water surface fighting ships, designed for Vosper's export market to provide nations like Libya and Iran with the firepower to replace the United States/UK as western supporting stabilisers under the Kissinger/Healy strategy. The lack of margin to accept the Type 2031 towed array sealed the fate of the class.

The class was criticised for being overcrowded: at 384 feet (117 m), they had 177 crewmen compared to 436 feet (133 m) and 185 crewmen for the Type 23-class frigate. This was important at a time when the Royal Navy was facing a manpower shortage. However the standard of accommodation for the officers was better than the RN average and the senior ratings enjoyed separate cabins – unlike the petty officers of the Type 42 destroyer of the same era, who slept in bunk rooms. The ratings' accommodation was also improved, with four-man sleeping berths leading off from the communal mess deck; again, far better than those of the Type 42 destroyer. In essence, the standard of accommodation and fitting were better, especially for officers, because it was a design intended to attract export orders. Higher automation and the new Mk 8 4.5-inch automatic gun combined with an electronic fit meant that the Type 21 was in some ways simpler than that of the Leanders or Type 42. The Type 21 class lacked both the long range Type 965 radar carried by most UK warships and the Limbo mortar with its associated sonar.

== Service ==
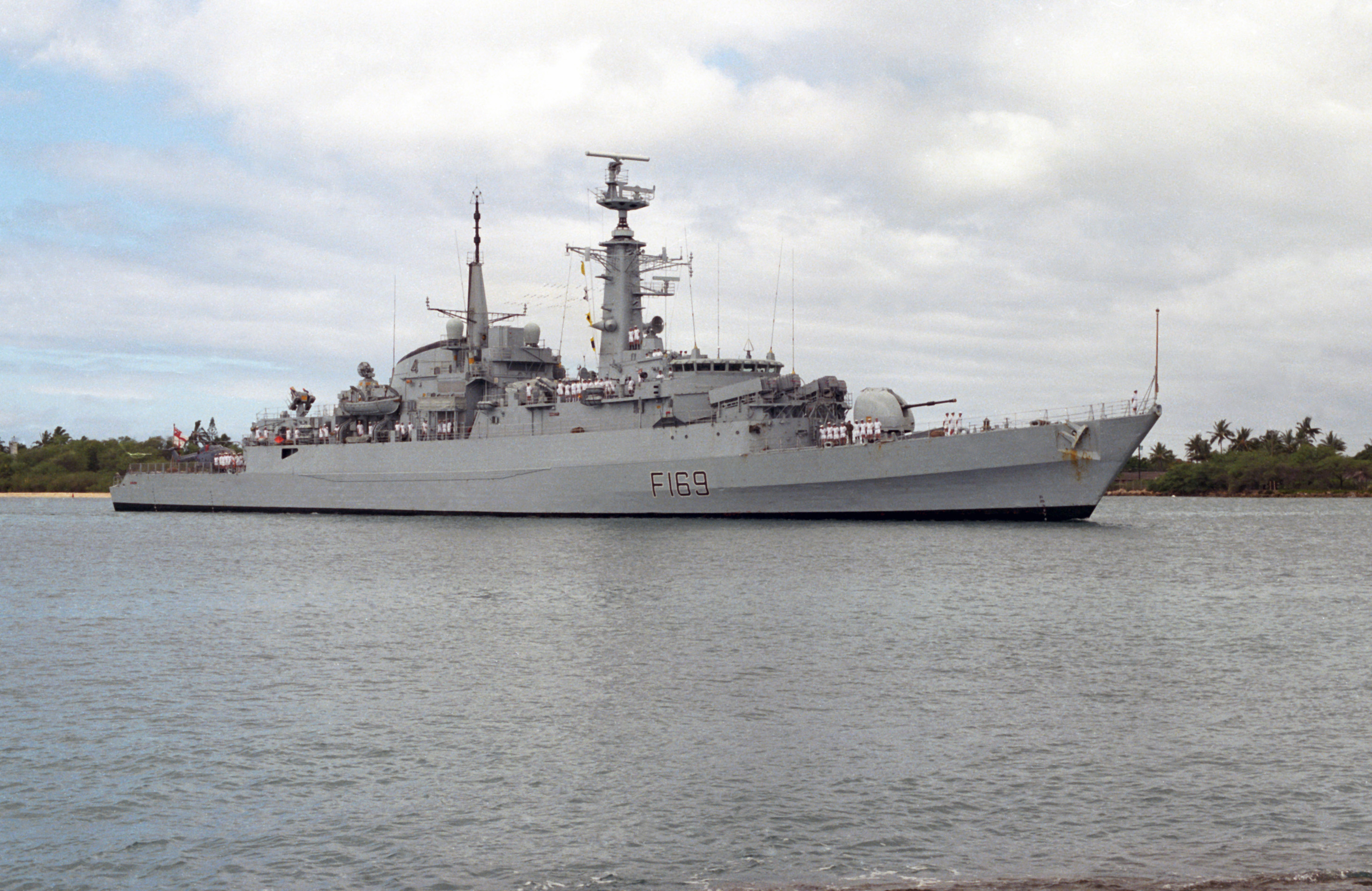
HMS Amazon during Exercise RIMPAC 86

Except for HMS Amazon which was in the Persian Gulf at the time, all ships in the class took part in the 1982 Falklands War as the 4th Frigate Squadron. They were heavily involved, performing extensive shore-bombardment missions and providing anti-submarine and anti-aircraft duties for the task force. On 10 May, HMS Alacrity and Arrow probed through Falkland Sound at night searching for minefields that might have impeded landings and operations, almost as expendable hulls. Alacrity engaged and sank an Argentine naval supply vessel in the Sound. On exiting the Sound at daybreak, they were attacked by the Argentine submarine San Luis, which fired two torpedoes; one hit Arrow's submarine towed decoy (as intended) and the other bounced off her hull, having failed to arm itself.

Two ships were lost: Ardent was hit by bombs dropped by Argentine aircraft on 21 May and consumed by fire; Antelope was hit by bombs on 23 May, one of which detonated while a bomb disposal team was attempting to defuse it on 24 May. The ship caught fire and set off her magazines, resulting in her breaking her back and sinking.

=== Sale to Pakistan ===
The six surviving Type 21 frigates were sold to Pakistan in 1993–1994 for 60 million US dollars. The Exocet and Seacat were removed before the sale and the frigates were given a basic refit at Karachi with US Harpoon anti-ship missile. Three of them were fitted with Phalanx CIWS, the others with 40mm Bofors L70 guns. The class was renamed by the Pakistan Navy as the Tariq class, after the first vessel that was acquired, Tariq, formerly Ambuscade. Only two of the six remain in service: Badr and Babur were both decommissioned in 2014, while Tippu Sultan and Shah Jahan were sunk as targets in 2020 and 2021 respectively. By the closing years of the class the Harpoon was generally seen as slow and obsolete and in 2008 Harpoon was removed. The Pakistan frigates were given the Chinese 6-cell LY-60N Hunting Eagle surface-to-air missile system.

== Ships ==
Pennant	Name	Hull builder	Ordered	Laid down	Launched	Accepted into service (Note: The term used in Navy Estimates and Defence Estimates is "accepted into service". Hansard has used the term "acceptance date". Leo Marriott in his various books uses the term "completed", as does Jane's Fighting Ships. These terms all mean the same thing: the date that the Navy accepts the vessel from the builder. This date is important because maintenance cycles, etc. are generally calculated from the acceptance date.)	Commissioned	Est. building cost (Note: "Unit cost, i.e. excluding cost of certain items (e.g. aircraft, First Outfits).")	Fate
F169	Amazon	Vosper Thornycroft, Woolston	26 March 1969	6 November 1969	26 April 1971	19 July 1974	11 May 1974	£16.8M	To Pakistan as PNS Babur. Decommissioned in December 2014.
F170	Antelope	Vosper Thornycroft	11 May 1970	23 March 1971	16 March 1972	30 June 1975	16 July 1975	£14.4M	Bombed by Argentinian Air Force Douglas A-4 Skyhawks on 23 May 1982 and sank following day in San Carlos Water
F171	Active	Vosper Thornycroft	11 May 1970	21 July 1971	23 November 1972	2 June 1977	17 June 1977	£24.1M	To Pakistan as PNS Shah Jahan. Decommissioned and sunk as a target in January 2021.
F172	Ambuscade	Yarrow Shipbuilders, Scotstoun	11 November 1971	1 September 1971	18 January 1973	23 August 1975	5 September 1975	£16.5M	To Pakistan as PNS Tariq
F173	Arrow	YSL	11 November 1971	28 September 1972	5 February 1974	16 May 1976	29 July 1976	£20.2M	To Pakistan as PNS Khaibar. Decommissioned and Sunk as a target during SEASPARK-2022 naval exercise
F174	Alacrity	YSL	11 November 1971	5 March 1973	18 September 1974	2 April 1977	2 July 1977	£23.8M	To Pakistan as PNS Badr. Decommissioned in 2014.
F184	Ardent	YSL	11 November 1971	26 February 1974	9 May 1975	10 September 1977	14 October 1977	£26.3M	Bombed by Argentine A-4 Skyhawks on 21 May 1982 in San Carlos Water and sank following day in Grantham Sound
F185	Avenger	YSL	11 November 1971	30 October 1974	20 November 1975	15 April 1978	15 April 1978	£27.7M	To Pakistan as PNS Tippu Sultan. Decommissioned and sunk as a target in 2020.

== Running costs ==
Date	Running cost	What is included
1981-82	£6.5 million	Average annual running cost of Type 21s at average 1981–82 prices and including associated aircraft costs, but excluding the costs of major refits.
1985–86	£7 million	The average cost of running and maintaining a type 21 frigate for one year.
1987–88	£3.8 million	The average annual operating costs, at financial year 1987-88 prices of a type 21 frigate. These costs include personnel, fuel, spares and so on, and administrative support services, but exclude new construction, capital equipment, and refit-repair costs.

== The Type 21 Club ==
In 2010, like-minded former crew members decided that an association should be formed for former shipmates and officers who ever served on these frigates. It also includes Pakistan Naval crew members of the frigates now part of the Pakistan navy.

== See also ==
- List of frigate classes by country

Equivalent frigates of the same era

- Lupo class
- Koni class
- Wielingen class
- Type 053
- Almirante Padilla class
- Ulsan class

== Bibliography ==
- Colledge, J. J.; Warlow, Ben (2006) [1969]. Ships of the Royal Navy: The Complete Record of All Fighting Ships of the Royal Navy from the 15th Century to the Present (3rd Rev ed.). London: Chatham Publishing. ISBN 978-1-86176-281-8. OCLC 67375475.
- Couhat, Jean Labayle and A.D. Baker. Combat Fleets of the World 1986/87. Annapolis, Maryland, USA: Naval Institute Press, 1986. ISBN 0-85368-860-5.
- Friedman, Norman. British Destroyers & Frigates: The Second World War and After. Barnsley, UK: Seaforth Publishing, 2008. ISBN 978-1-84832-015-4.
- Gardiner, Robert and Stephen Chumbley. Conway's All The World's Fighting Ships 1947–1995. Annapolis, Maryland, USA: Naval Institute Press, 1995. ISBN 1-55750-132-7.
- Marriott, Leo. Royal Navy Frigates 1945-1983 Ian Allan, 1983 ISBN 0-7110-1322-5.
- Moore, John E. Warships of the Royal Navy; New Edition, Jane's Publishing, 1981 ISBN 0-7106-0105-0.
- Preston, Antony. The World's Worst Warships. London: Conway Maritime Press, 2002. ISBN 0-85177-754-6.
- Lippiett, Capt. R.J. Type 21 - Modern Combat Ships 5 Ian Allan, 1990 ISBN 0-7110-1903-7.
