= Rolls-Royce Tyne =

1950s British turboprop aircraft engine

Tyne
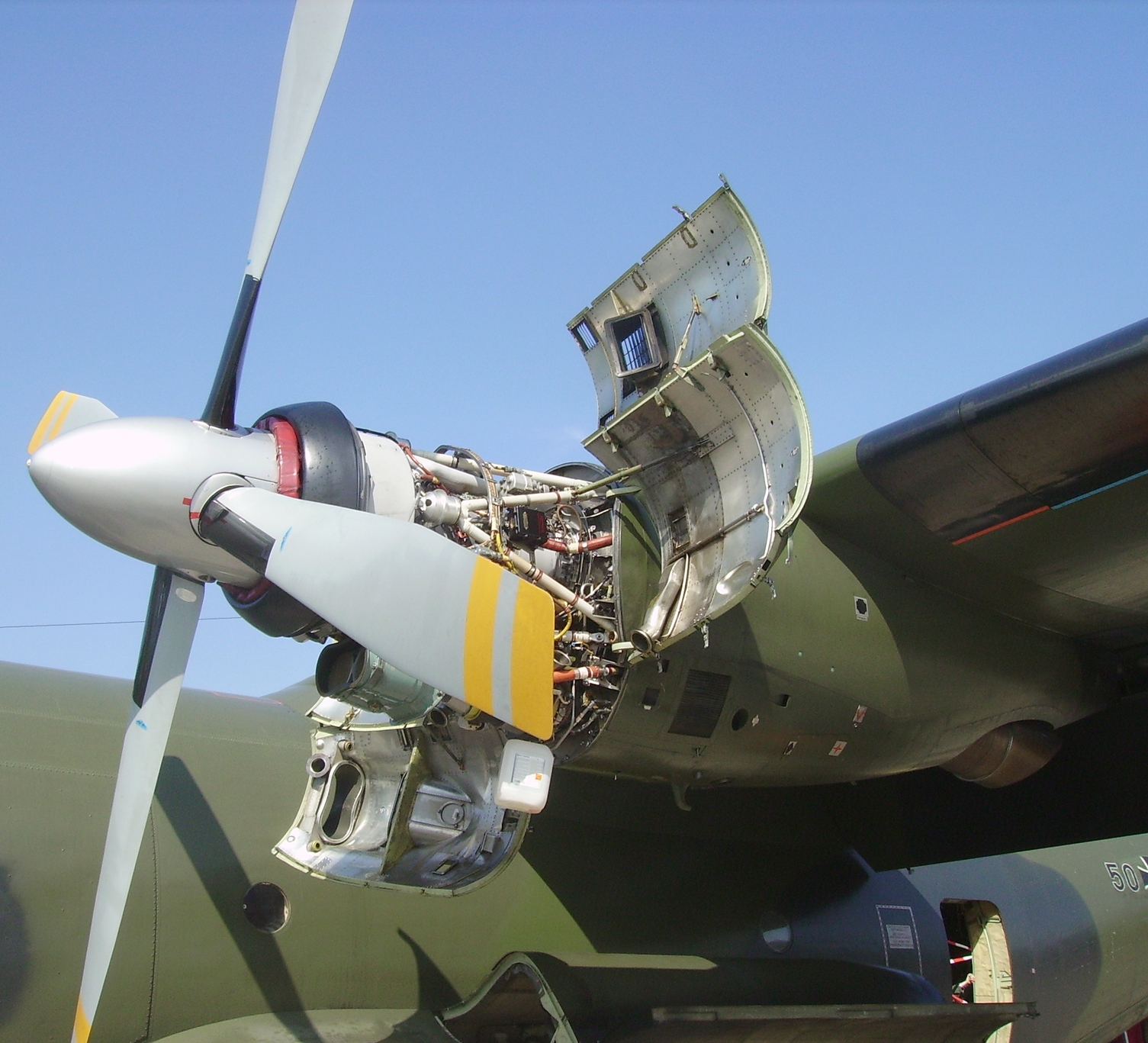
- Rolls-Royce Tyne installed in a Luftwaffe C-160
- Type: Turboprop
- Manufacturer: Rolls-Royce Limited
- First run: April 1955
- Major applications: Breguet Atlantic; Canadair CL-44; Transall C-160; Vickers Vanguard

The Rolls-Royce RB.109 Tyne is a twin-shaft turboprop engine developed in the mid to late 1950s by Rolls-Royce Limited to a requirement for the Vickers Vanguard airliner. It was first test flown during 1956 in the nose of a modified Avro Lincoln. Following company naming convention for gas turbine engines this turboprop design was named after the River Tyne.

== Design and development ==
Designed in 1954 by a team under Lionel Haworth and intended as a more powerful alternative to the Dart, the RB.109 Tyne was initially designed for a power of 2,500 shp but when first run in April 1955 the engine far exceeded expectations and was soon being type-tested at 4,220 shp. The Tyne was developed primarily for the four-engined Vickers Vanguard airliner, the prototype first flying on 20 January 1959 equipped with four Tyne Mk.506 of 4,985 e.s.h.p. Production deliveries of the engine were made from mid-1959 onwards to power the 43 Vanguards delivered to British European Airways and Trans-Canada Airlines.

The engine was further developed with greater power and used in the later twin-engined Dassault-Breguet Atlantique long-range reconnaissance aircraft; also in the Canadair CL-44 and Transall C-160 transport aircraft.

A single stage HP turbine drives the nine-stage HP compressor. A three-stage LP turbine drives the six-stage LP compressor and, through a reduction gearbox, the propeller. The combustor is cannular.

The Mark 515 Tyne had a nominal takeoff power output of 5,730 hp (4,273 kW) equivalent power, flat rated to ISA+16.8C.

An agreement was signed in 1963 between Hispano-Suiza and Rolls-Royce for the licence production of the Tyne for the Breguet Atlantic and Transall C-160. Each company that was part of the agreement built parts for itself and the partners, Rolls-Royce (United Kingdom) 20%, Hispano-Suiza (France) 44%, MAN (Germany) 28% and FN (Belgium) 8%. The final assembly was undertaken by both MAN and Hispano-Suiza. The first production batch was for 80 engines and 40 spares for the Atlantic.

== Variants ==
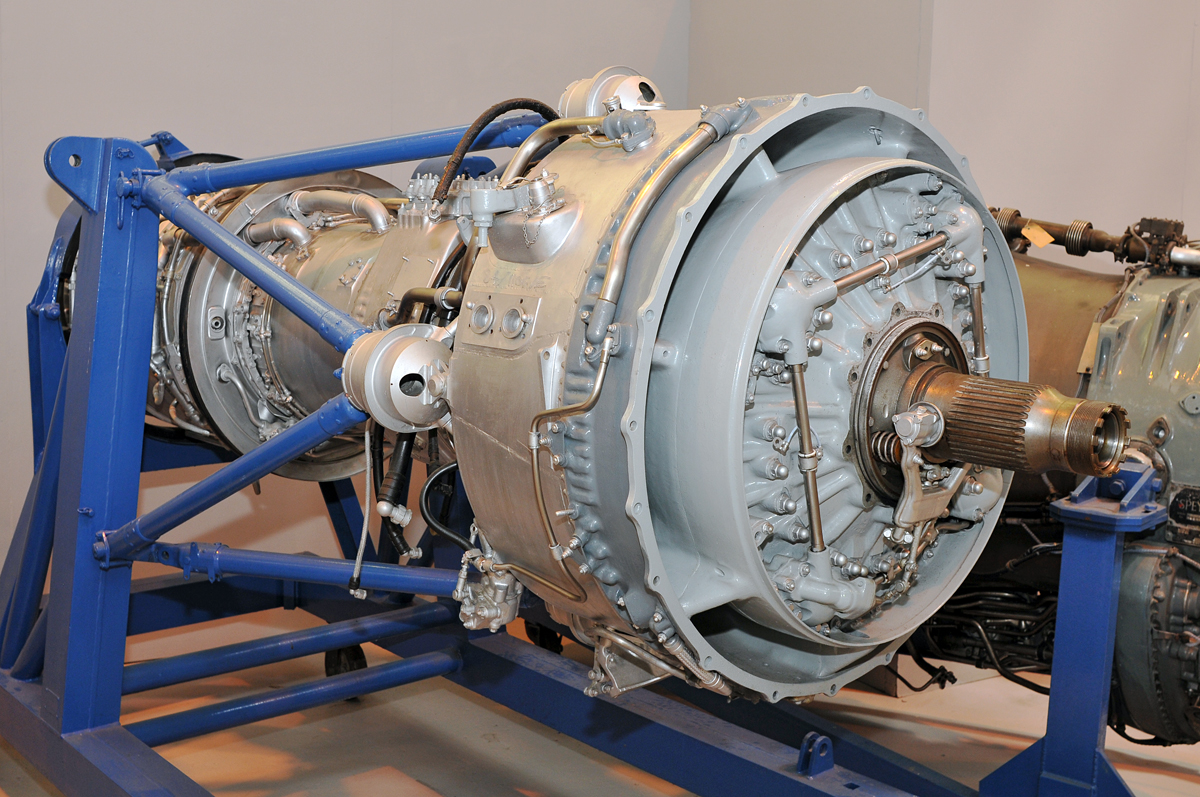
Rolls-Royce Tyne Mk.506 at RAF Museum Cosford

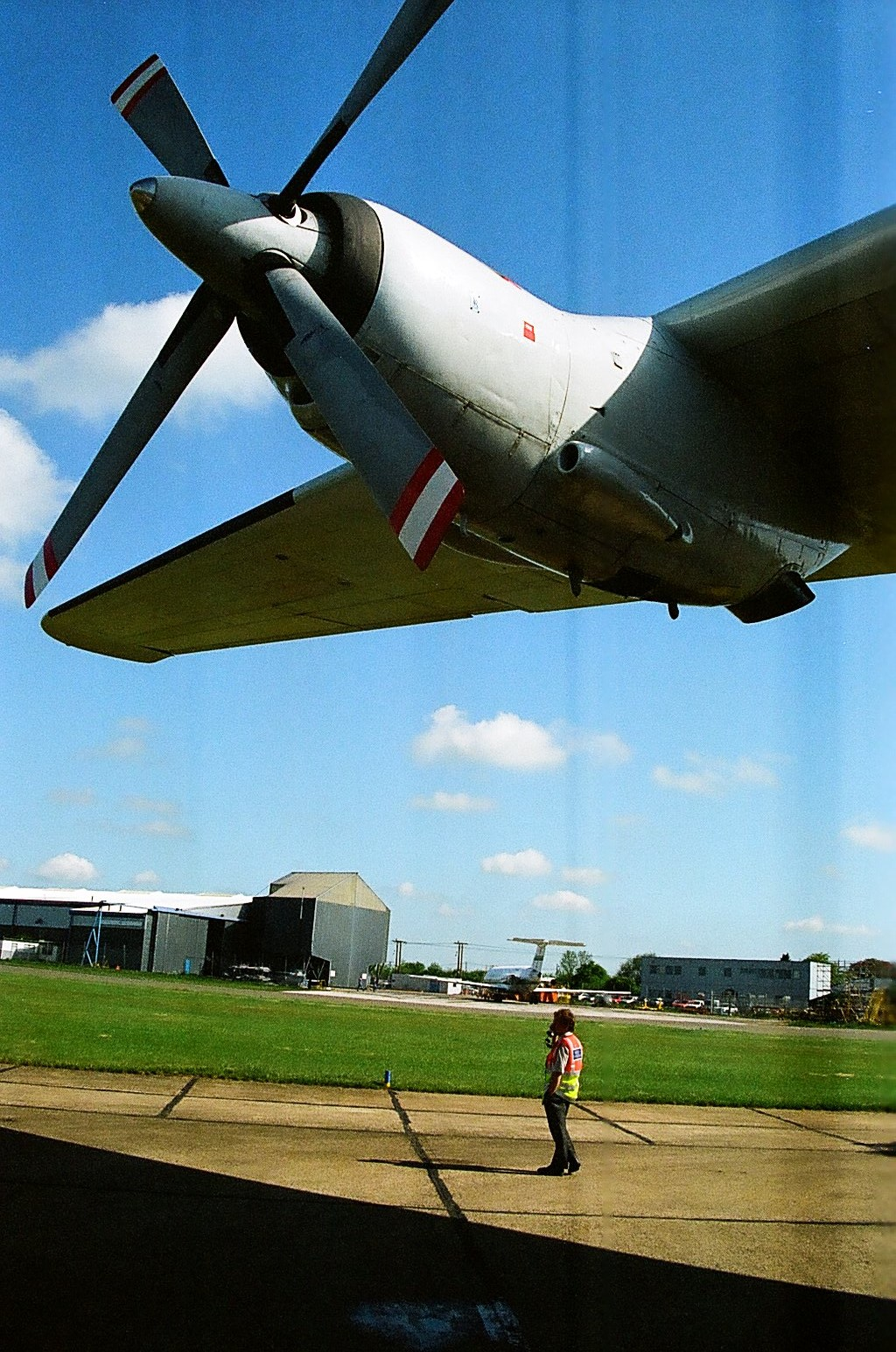
Rolls-Royce Tyne Mk.12 on Short Belfast G-HLFT, Stansted 1997

RTy.1
Takeoff power of 4,500 bhp (3,400 kW); cruise power of 2,455 bhp (1,831 kW) at 425 mph (684 km/h; 369 kn) and 25,000 ft (7,600 m) altitude, with specific fuel consumption (SFC) of 0.405 lb/(hp⋅h) (0.184 kg/(hp⋅h); 0.246 kg/kWh); fitted to Vickers Type 951 Vanguard and Vickers Merchantman
RTy.11
Takeoff power of 5,050 bhp (3,770 kW) with SFC of 0.48 lb/(hp⋅h) (0.22 kg/(hp⋅h); 0.29 kg/kWh); cruise power of 2,845 bhp (2,122 kW) at 425 mph (684 km/h; 369 kn) and 25,000 ft (7,600 m) altitude, with SFC of 0.388 lb/(hp⋅h) (0.176 kg/(hp⋅h); 0.236 kg/kWh); for Vickers Type 952 Vanguard
RTy.12
4,616 hp (3,442 kW) for Canadair CL-44
RTy.12
Takeoff power of 5,305 bhp (3,956 kW) with SFC of 0.449 lb/(hp⋅h) (0.204 kg/(hp⋅h); 0.273 kg/kWh); for Short Belfast
RTy.20 Mk 21
5,667 hp (4,226 kW) for Breguet 1150 Atlantic and Breguet ATL2 Atlantique
RTy.20 Mk 22
5,670 hp (4,228 kW) for Transall C-160
RTy.20
4,860 hp (3,624 kW) for Aeritalia G.222T
RTy.20
6,035 hp (4,500 kW) for Transall C-160 and Breguet ATL2 Atlantique
RTy.22
projected military use engine rated at 7,075 hp (5,276 kW) equivalent
RTy.32
projected military use engine rated at 8,400 hp (6,264 kW) equivalent
Mk.101
(RTy.12)
Mk.506
Mk.512
Mk.515
Mk.515-101W
Mk 801
Mk 45
RM1A
Marinised ship powerplant
RM1C
Essentially similar to the RM1A
RM3C
Essentially similar to the RM1A

== Applications ==
=== Aircraft ===
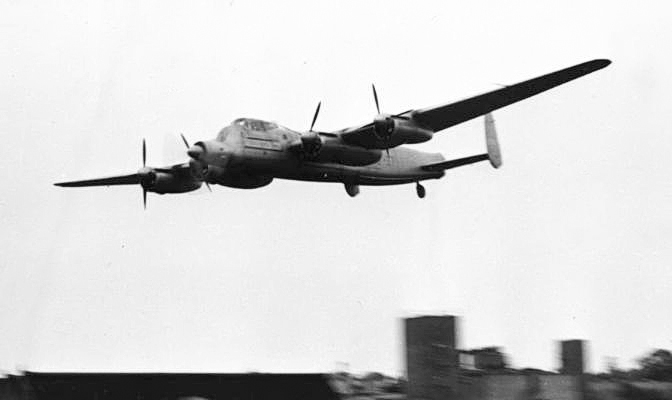
Rolls-Royce Tyne testbed Avro Lincoln demonstrating at Farnborough 1956 on just the nose Tyne, the four Merlins being shut down

- Aeritalia G.222
- Avro Lincoln (testbed)
- Breguet Atlantic
- Canadair CL-44
- Conroy Skymonster
- Short Belfast
- Transall C-160
- Vickers Vanguard

=== Ships ===
The marine version, the Rolls-Royce Tyne RM1A, RM1C and RM3C remained in service as the cruise gas turbines in Royal Navy Type 21 frigates, Type 42 destroyers and Type 22 frigates until the retirement of the 4 Batch 3 Type 22 frigates (2011) and the last remaining Type 42 Destroyer (2013). They were also used in numerous other European ships such as the Tromp and Kortenaer-class frigates.

== Engines on display ==
A Rolls-Royce Tyne is on public display at the Royal Air Force Museum Cosford.

- East Midlands Aeropark
- Rolls-Royce Heritage Trust, Derby

== Specifications (Tyne RTy.20 Mk 21) ==
Data from Jane's All the World's Aircraft 1962-63.

==== General characteristics ====
- Type: Twin-spool turboprop
- Length: 108.724 in (2,762 mm)
- Diameter: 55.12 in (1,400 mm)
- Dry weight: 2,391 lb (1,085 kg)

==== Components ====
- Compressor: Axial, six-stage LP, nine-stage HP
- Combustors: 10 cannular flame tubes
- Turbine: Three-stage LP, single-stage HP
- Fuel type: Avtur
- Oil system: Pressure spray/splash with dry sump

==== Performance ====
- Maximum power output: 6,100 hp (4,549 kW) equivalent power
- Overall pressure ratio: 13.5:1
- Air mass flow: 46.5 lb/s (21.1 kg/s)
- Turbine inlet temperature: 800 °C (1,470 °F)
- Specific fuel consumption: 0.485 lb/hp·h (0.298 kg/kW·h) for take-off
- Power-to-weight ratio: 2.55 hp/lb (4.194 kW/kg)

== See also ==
Comparable engines

- Allison T56
- Bristol Proteus
- Ivchenko AI-20
- Lycoming T55
- Napier Eland

Related lists

- List of aircraft engines
