= Clive Johnstone =

Royal Navy admiral (1963–2024)

Vice Admiral Sir Clive Johnstone KBE CB
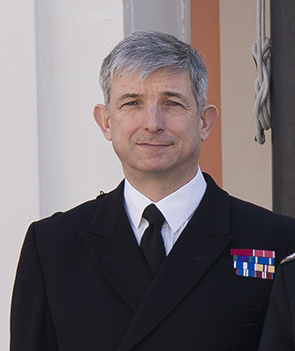
- Johnstone in 2016
- Born: 6 September 1963; Kampala, Uganda
- Died: 12 May 2024 (aged 60); Newport, Wales
- Military career
- Allegiance: United Kingdom
- Branch: Royal Navy
- Service years: 1985–2020
- Rank: Vice Admiral
- Commands: Allied Maritime Command; HMS Bulwark; HMS Iron Duke
- Conflicts: Bosnian War; Kosovo War; Iraq War
- Awards: Knight Commander of the Order of the British Empire; Companion of the Order of the Bath

Vice Admiral Sir Clive Charles Carruthers Johnstone, KBE, CB (6 September 1963 – 12 May 2024) was a British Royal Navy officer who served as Commander, Allied Maritime Command from 2015 to 2019. During his tenure as commanding officer of HMS Bulwark, he participated in Operation Highbrow, the largest British evacuation since the evacuation of Dunkirk. From May 2023 until Johnstone's death in May 2024, he was the National President of the Royal British Legion.

== Early life and education ==
Johnstone was born on 6 September 1963 in Kampala, Uganda. He was educated at Shrewsbury School, an all-boys public school. He studied anthropology at Durham University, graduating with a Bachelor of Arts (BA) degree.

== Naval career ==
Johnstone joined the Royal Navy in 1985. The first ship he served on was the fishery protection vessel HMS Shetland. Later, he was the navigator on the minesweeper HMS Nurton. From 1996 to 1997, he was the first lieutenant of HMY Britannia. His tenure during her final commission covered a visit by then-Prince Charles to Northern Ireland, Prince Charles's participation in the 1997 Hong Kong handover ceremony, and a summer cruise by Queen Elizabeth II to the Western Isles. He became commanding officer of the frigate HMS Iron Duke in 1999. He became the Fleet Programmer in 2001, commanding officer of the amphibious transport dock HMS Bulwark in 2005, and Director of Naval Staff at the Ministry of Defence in April 2008.

While he commanded Bulwark, he participated in Operation Highbrow, the largest British evacuation since the evacuation of Dunkirk. Bulwark took 1,300 evacuees from Beirut to Cyprus. After the operation, Johnstone was appointed a Commander of the Order of the British Empire.

Johnstone went on to be Principal Staff Officer to the Chief of the Defence Staff in December 2008, Flag Officer, Sea Training in July 2011, and Assistant Chief of the Naval Staff (Policy) in May 2013. His latest appointment was as Commander Allied Maritime Command in October 2015, when he was promoted to vice admiral on 15 October 2015. Johnstone was replaced as Commander Allied Maritime Command by Vice Admiral Keith Blount on 20 May 2019.

Johnstone was appointed a Knight Commander of the Order of the British Empire in the 2019 New Year Honours, and retired from the Royal Navy on 3 January 2020.

== Later life and death ==
On 21 May 2023, at the National Conference in Torquay, he took over as National President of The Royal British Legion from Lieutenant General James Bashall CBE, CB.

Johnstone died on 12 May 2024, at the age of 60.

Military offices
Preceded by Christopher Snow	Flag Officer Sea Training; 2011–2013	Succeeded by Ben Key
Preceded by Matt Parr	Assistant Chief of the Naval Staff (Policy); 2013–2015	Succeeded by Nick Hine
Preceded by Peter Hudson	Commander Allied Maritime Command; 2015–2019	Succeeded by Keith Blount
