= Commander Fleet Operational Standards and Training =

Royal navy training organisation

Commander Fleet Operational Standards and Training Fleet Operational Standards and Training
- Command badge
- Active: 1958–present
- Country: United Kingdom
- Branch: Royal Navy
- Role: Training
- Size: Commodore's Command
- Part of: Fleet Commander
- Command HQ: RN Warfighting Centre, HMNB Portsmouth

Commanders
- Current Commander: Commodore Andrew Stacey

Fleet Operational Standards and Training (FOST) is a Royal Navy training organisation. FOST is the training organisation responsible for ensuring that Royal Navy and Royal Fleet Auxiliary vessels are fit to join the operational fleet.

Commander Fleet Operational Standards and Training Headquarters (COM FOST HQ) is the HQ from where FOST is run, and this is headed up by a Commodore.

== History ==
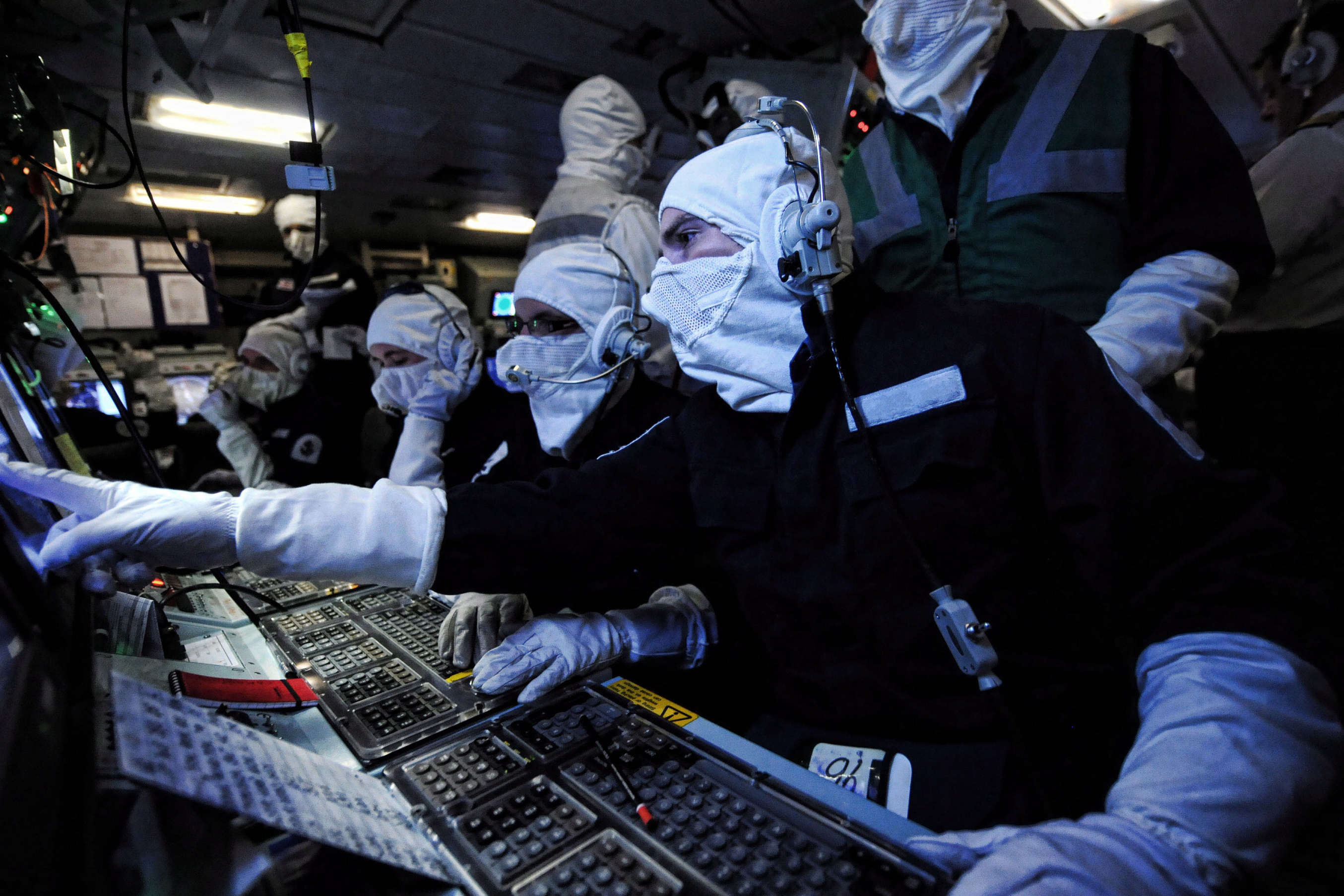
Operations room staff on board HMS Illustrious during Basic Operational Sea Training.

A. Cecil Hampshire's "The Royal Navy Since 1945" writes that

[U]nder the system of Home Service, General Service, and Foreign Service commissions which was introduced in 1954, warships required to be re-manned with completely new crews more frequently than in the old days of "running" commissions. Thus in September 1958 under a Flag Officer Sea Training, special "shakedown" or settling in courses lasting seven weeks were started to train the crews of newly commissioned ships in operating their equipment and give them experience in dealing with every eventuality likely to be met with in subsequent service at home and abroad.

Portland was the selected location and by the time Hampshire wrote in the early 1970s, "warships from other NATO and Commonwealth countries and from foreign navies" were undertaking the same courses of training.

Originally operating out of Portland, Flag Officer Sea Training moved to Plymouth in 1995 when Rear-Admiral John Tolhurst transferred his flag courtesy of HMS Iron Duke. FOST's superior officer changed from Flag Officer Surface Flotilla to Commander-in-Chief Fleet.

As a result of the Royal Navy programme 'Fleet First', FOST became the single command responsible for all sea training. The submarine sea-training organisation came under FOST and surface ship training previously undertaken by Flag Officer Surface Flotilla and the squadron staffs also shifted to FOST.

FOST operated a pair of Eurocopter Dauphin helicopters to allow its instructors to join vessels with minimal delay during intense training periods. Plymouth Airport closed on 23 December 2011. The aircraft operate from HMS Raleigh in Cornwall but are based at Newquay. The Dauphins were replaced by Dorset-based HeliOperations Leonardo AW139 helicopters.

As well as training Royal Navy personnel, it has also been an important source of revenue in training foreign naval crews to handle and fight their vessels, with around one third of its work used in this capacity.

A March 2020 edition of Navy News noted that the Director People and Training took over the commands under FOST, namely BRNC Dartmouth, HMS Raleigh, Commando Training Centre Royal Marines, HMS Collingwood and HMS Temeraire.

In May 2020, Flag Officer Sea Training became Fleet Operational Sea Training and the position was taken up by a Commodore in the appointment of Commander Fleet Operational Sea Training (COM FOST).

== Training regime ==
The main training and testing period is called Basic Operational Sea Training (BOST), which typically lasts six weeks. It combines surveys of the physical condition of the ship with tests of the crew's readiness for deployment, including a weekly war-fighting and damage control scenario known as a 'Thursday War'. BOST thus has elements of the US Navy's Board of Inspection and Survey (INSURV) and Composite Training Unit Exercise assessments. When USS Forrest Sherman underwent a short version of BOST in 2012, comments from her sailors included "I've been through other exercises, inspections, and deployment and this was by far the hardest ... It was even more intense than INSURV".

== Commanders ==
=== Flag Officer Sea Training ===
Flag Officers Sea Training included:

- Vice-Admiral William G. Crawford, September 1958-August 1960
- Vice-Admiral Sir Peter Gretton, August 1960-December 1961
- Rear-Admiral Horace R. Law, December 1961-May 1963
- Rear-Admiral Patrick U. Bayly, May 1963-April 1965
- Rear-Admiral Philip G. Sharp, April 1965-July 1967
- Rear-Admiral John C. Y. Roxburgh, July 1967-May 1969
- Rear-Admiral J. Anthony R. Troup, May 1969-March 1971
- Rear-Admiral E. Gerard N. Mansfield, March 1971-October 1972
- Rear-Admiral John O. Roberts, October 1972-April 1974
- Rear-Admiral James H. F. Eberle, April 1974-April 1975
- Rear-Admiral John R.S. Gerard-Pearse, April 1975-November 1976
- Rear-Admiral Gwynedd I. Pritchard, November 1976-November 1978
- Rear-Admiral Anthony J. Whetstone, November 1978-September 1980
- Rear-Admiral David M. Eckersley-Maslin, September 1980-April 1982
- Rear-Admiral John M. Webster, April 1982-May 1984
- Rear-Admiral Michael H. Livesay, May 1984-December 1985
- Rear-Admiral Barry N. Wilson, December 1985-June 1987
- Rear-Admiral John F. Coward, June 1987-June 1988
- Rear-Admiral Roy T. Newman, June 1988-December 1989
- Rear-Admiral A. Bruce Richardson, December 1989-July 1991
- Rear-Admiral Michael C. Boyce, July 1991-September 1992
- Rear-Admiral John G. Tolhurst, September 1992-April 1996
- Rear-Admiral Peter M. Franklyn, April 1996-July 1997
- Rear-Admiral R. John Lippiett, July 1997-September 1999
- Rear-Admiral Alexander K. Backus, September 1999-November 2001
- Rear-Admiral James C. Rapp, November 2001-April 2004
- Rear-Admiral Roger S. Ainsley, April 2004-June 2006
- Rear-Admiral Anthony J. Rix, June 2006-May 2007
- Rear-Admiral Richard J. Ibbotson, May 2007-February 2009
- Rear-Admiral Christopher A. Snow, February 2009-July 2011
- Rear-Admiral Clive C. C. Johnstone, July 2011-April 2013
- Rear-Admiral Benjamin J. Key, April 2013-July 2015

=== Flag Officer Sea Training and Assistant Chief of the Naval Staff (Training) ===
Post holders include:

- Rear-Admiral John R.H. Clink, July 2015-June 2018
- Rear-Admiral William J. Warrender June 2018 – 2020

=== Commander Fleet Operational Sea Training ===
- Commodore Andrew Stacey, circa June 2020

== Notes ==
- Hampshire, A. Cecil (1975). The Royal Navy Since 1945. London: William Kimber & Co. Ltd. p. 176. ISBN 0718300343.
