= HMS Westminster (F237) =

Former Type 23 or Duke-class frigate of the Royal Navy, 1994

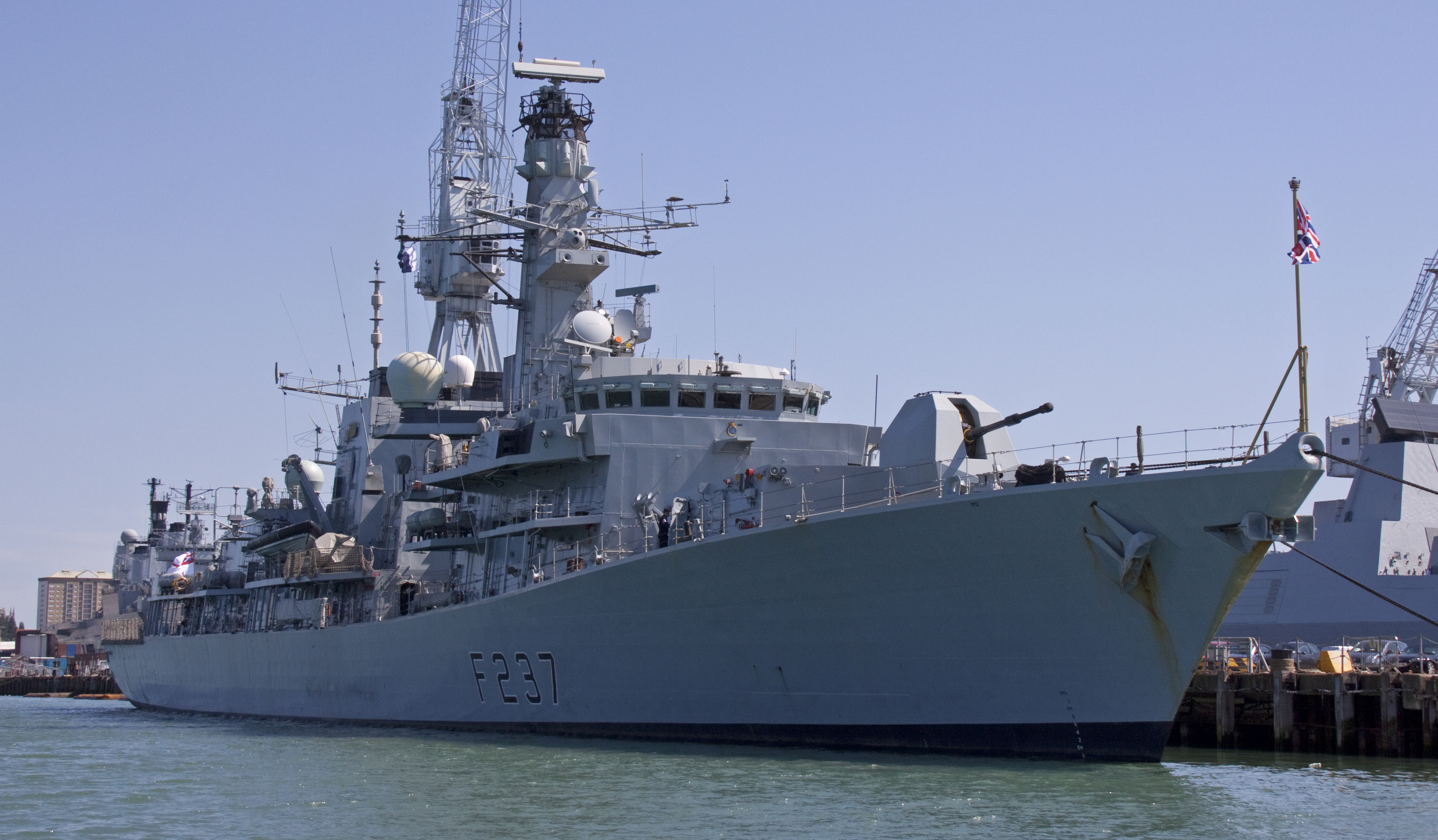
- HMS Westminster, 2011

History

United Kingdom
- Name: Westminster
- Ordered: December 1989
- Builder: Swan Hunter, Tyne and Wear, United Kingdom
- Laid down: 18 January 1991
- Launched: 4 February 1992
- Commissioned: 13 May 1994
- Out of service: May 2024
- Home port: Portsmouth
- Identification: IMO number: 8949654; MMSI number: 234641000; Callsign: GCOK
- Motto: For Nation and for Glory
- Fate: Scrapped 2026
- Badge

General characteristics
- Class & type: Type 23 frigate
- Displacement: 4,900 t (4,800 long tons; 5,400 short tons)
- Length: 133 m (436 ft 4 in)
- Beam: 16.1 m (52 ft 10 in)
- Draught: 7.3 m (23 ft 11 in)
- Propulsion: CODLAG: Four 1,510 kW (2,020 shp) Paxman Valenta 12CM diesel generators; Two GEC electric motors delivering 2,980 kW (4,000 shp); Two Rolls-Royce Spey SM1C delivering 23,190 kW (31,100 shp)
- Speed: In excess of 28 knots (52 km/h; 32 mph)
- Range: 7,500 nautical miles (14,000 km) at 15 kn (28 km/h)
- Boats & landing craft carried: 2 × PAC 24 RIBs
- Complement: 185 (accommodation for up to 205)
- Sensors & processing systems: Sonar 2087
- Electronic warfare & decoys: UAF-1 ESM, or, UAT Mod 1; Seagnat; Type 182 towed torpedo decoy; Surface Ship Torpedo Defence
- Armament: Anti-air missiles: 1 × 32-cell GWS 35 Vertical Launching System (VLS) for: 32 × Sea Ceptor missiles (1–25+ km); Anti-ship missiles: Originally up to 2 × quad Harpoon launchers (8 × missiles); Anti-submarine torpedoes: 2 × twin 12.75 in (324 mm) Sting Ray torpedo tubes; Guns: 1 × BAE 4.5 inch Mk 8 naval gun; 2 × 30 mm DS30M Mk2 guns, or, 2 × 30 mm DS30B guns; 2 × Miniguns; 4 × General-purpose machine gun
- Aircraft carried: 1 × Wildcat HMA2, armed with: 2 × Sting Ray anti-submarine torpedoes, or; 20 × Martlet multirole air-surface missiles (from 2021); Mk 11 depth charges; or; 1 × Westland Merlin HM2, armed with; 4 × anti submarine torpedoes
- Aviation facilities: Flight deck; Enclosed hangar

HMS Westminster was a Type 23 frigate of the Royal Navy, and the second ship to bear the name. She was launched on 4 February 1992 and named after the Dukedom of Westminster.

== Operational history ==
=== 1994–2000 ===
In early August 1995, Operation Harlech was initiated in response to a volcanic eruption in Montserrat. The Westminster arrived off the island on 9 August and provided emergency relief aid. The ship was joined by HMS Southampton on 19 August, both ships provided emergency relief assistance until the end of the month.

Westminster was used for the interior shots in the 1997 James Bond film Tomorrow Never Dies as three different (fictional) Type 23 frigates – HMS Chester, HMS Devonshire and HMS Bedford.

On 3 February 1999, Westminster joined the Atlantic Patrol Ship South, relieving HMS Norfolk which was taking part in Operation Basilica in Sierra Leone. When the situation improved it was decided to withdraw Westminster and she sailed from the area on 18 March.

=== 2001–2010 ===
In 2004, Westminster was assigned one of the Royal Navy's first Merlin helicopters. Also in 2004, the ship was the first to be fitted with the new low-frequency Sonar 2087 designed to detect the most advanced submarines. The technology is controversial as its effects on marine wildlife remain unclear.

In December 2005, the ship's company of Westminster were all granted Freedom of the City of Westminster. 200 naval officers and sailors in full ceremonial uniform paraded through the streets of London from Westminster Abbey to Horse Guards as part of the celebration service. Westminster was chosen as a very rare recognition of her contributions to Westminster schools, local charities and the community as a whole. The honour entitles the crew the freedom to "parade through the City on all ceremonial occasions in full panoply and with drums beating, colours flying and bayonets fixed".

The frigate was deployed to Burma in May 2008 to spearhead the British relief effort after Cyclone Nargis devastated the country, but later had to withdraw after the junta refused to grant permission for aid to be landed.

=== 2011–2022 ===
In March 2011, Westminster took part in Operation Ellamy, the British role in the coalition action during the 2011 Libyan civil war by enforcing a naval blockade. She took part in Exercise Saxon Warrior in the Western Approaches with the US aircraft carrier George H.W. Bush in May 2011, culminating in a so-called 'Thursday War'.

On 23 January 2012, Westminster departed Portsmouth to reinforce the British guided-missile destroyer Daring that was also underway for the Persian Gulf to relieve the frigate Argyll.

Whilst in the Persian Gulf she made a port call in Dubai where one of her sailors (Leading Seaman Timothy Andrew MacColl, 27, from Gosport in Hampshire) disappeared, prompting a bilateral search between the Royal Navy and local authorities. He was declared dead by the Royal Navy in May 2014.

In early 2013, she was part of the multi-national Exercise Joint Warrior, practising amphibious operations off the coast of Scotland. In September she was part of the COUGAR 13 task group, for a series of joint exercises in the Mediterranean and Persian Gulf. She visited Gibraltar on the way to the Middle East. This came amidst growing tensions between Spain and Britain over the status of Gibraltar; however the British Government described the visit as 'routine'. In September 2013, she practised anti-submarine drills with the Italian Navy's Sauro-class submarine Salvatore Pelosi and the Durand de la Penne-class destroyer Francesco Mimbelli. In the Gulf of Oman, Westminster conducted anti-submarine drills against USS Dallas. In October 2013, she exercised with the Indian Navy off Goa.

On 8 September 2014, she docked at East India Docks, by Canary Wharf, in London. In November 2014, Westminster entered extended refit in Portsmouth; she returned to sea in January 2017 with a new principal weapon system, Sea Ceptor, in place of Seawolf, Radar Type 997 and numerous modifications and alterations to her accommodation and working spaces.

Westminster, in company with Iron Duke sailed with USS George H.W. Bush again, as in 2011, by taking part in Exercise Saxon Warrior off Scotland.

During December 2018 on a tour of the Baltic Sea, Westminster experienced problems with her propulsion and engines while visiting the port of Gdynia, curtailing other port visits in the region.

In July 2020, she took part in NATO exercise Dynamic Mongoose.

In September 2022, Westminster fired two Harpoon missiles in Operation Atlantic Thunder 22 in a SinkEx exercise alongside US forces in which the decommissioned US frigate USS Boone was sunk in the North Atlantic.

In 2022, Westminster spent 90 days at sea.

Westminster entered a planned two-year refit in October 2022 with the intent of extending her service life until 2028–29.

=== 2023–2026 ===
In May 2023, it was reported that the refit had been suspended due to the poor material condition of the ship, making her future uncertain.

In January 2024, it was reported the possibility that Westminster would be decommissioned and the crew reassigned to a future Type 26 frigate. In May 2024, it was indicated that HMS Westminster would be retired and scrapped.

In August 2026 Westminster arrived at a scrapyard in Turkey and was subsequently scrapped.

== Affiliations ==
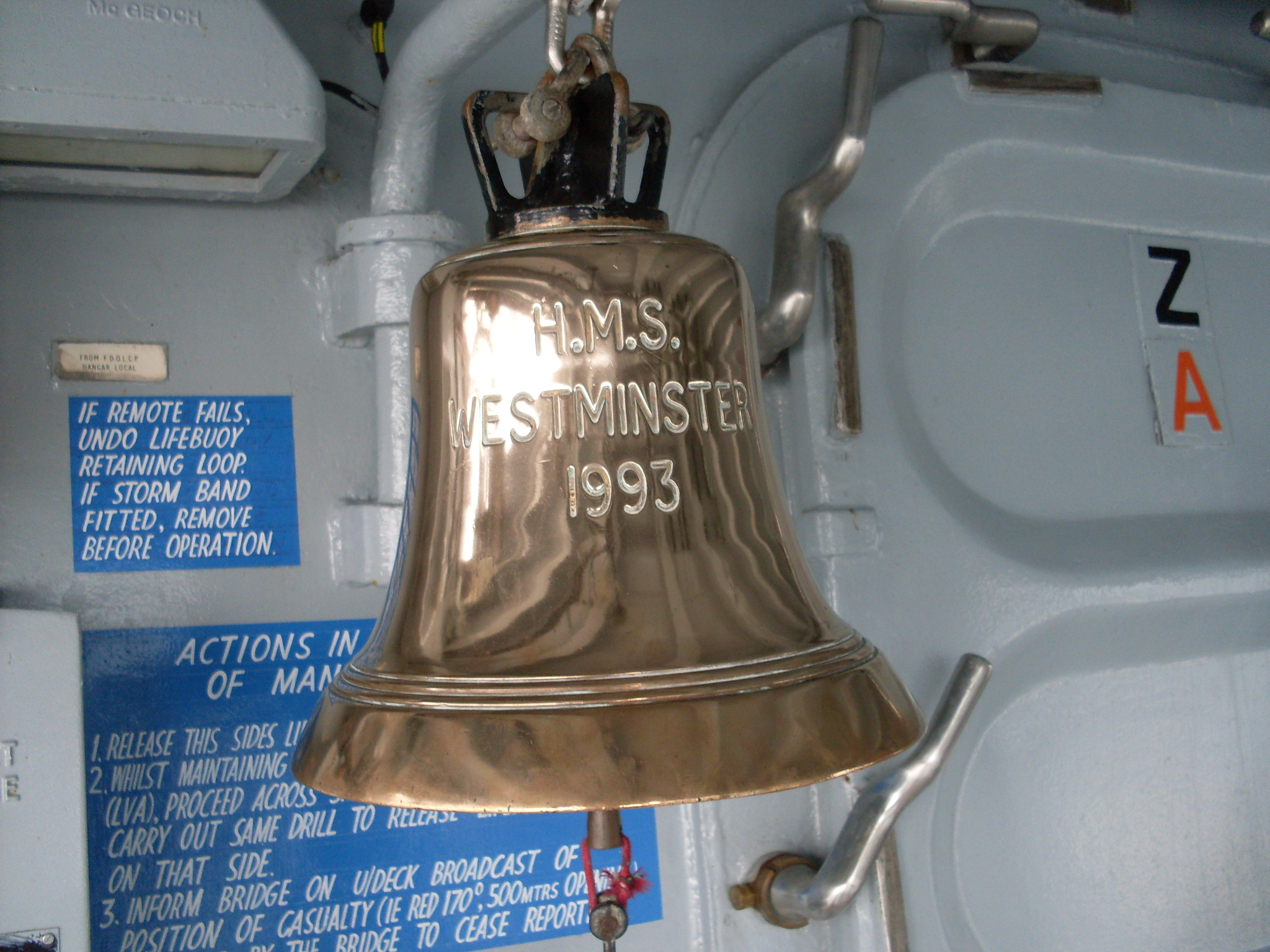
Westminster's ship's bell

- Churchers College Royal Navy CCF Section
- City of London School Royal Navy CCF Section
- City of Westminster
- Duke of Westminster
- Haringey and Enfield Sea Cadet Unit
- Household Cavalry Mounted Regiment
- National Westminster Bank (Westminster branch)
- Southgate and Barnet Sea Cadet Unit
- The Parliamentary Maritime Group
- Queen's Own Yeomanry
- University of London Royal Naval Unit
- Westminster Abbey Choir School
- Westminster Underground Station
- Worshipful Company of Fan Makers
