= Christopher Snow =

Rear Admiral Christopher Snow CBE DL
- Born: 16 April 1958 (age 68)
- Military career
- Allegiance: United Kingdom
- Branch: Royal Navy
- Service years: 1976–2011
- Rank: Rear Admiral
- Commands: HMS Atherstone; HMS Iron Duke; HMS Coventry; HMS Ocean
- Conflicts: War in Afghanistan
- Awards: Commander of the Order of the British Empire

Rear Admiral Christopher Allen Snow CBE DL (born 16 April 1958) is a former Royal Navy officer who served as Flag Officer Sea Training.

== Personal life ==
Snow was born on 16 April 1958 to Rear Admiral Kenneth Arthur Snow, CB and Pamela Elizabeth Snow. In 1983 he married Helen Maria Young and they had a son and a daughter.

== Education ==
Snow attended King's School, Canterbury as a junior, then Churcher's College, Petersfield, and Durham University, where he gained a BA Hons. in Archaeology.

== Naval career ==
Snow joined the Royal Navy in 1976. In 1982 he was 2nd Navigator HM Yacht Britannia. In 1983 in the aftermath of the Falklands War he took charge of HM Prize Tiger Bay, a captured Argentinian patrol boat.

He became commanding officer of the minesweeper HMS Atherstone in 1993, commanding officer of the frigate HMS Iron Duke in 1994 and Military Assistant to the Vice Chief of the Defence Staff in 1996. He went on to be commanding officer of the frigate HMS Coventry in 1998, Assistant Director, Partnerships and International Relationships (Navy) at the Ministry of Defence in 2000 and Operations Team Leader at Permanent Joint Headquarters, Northwood, during the War in Afghanistan, in 2001. He went on to be Assistant Chief of Staff, Programmes and Resources at Fleet Headquarters in 2002, Director of Naval Resources and Plans at the Ministry of Defence in 2004 and commanding officer of the helicopter carrier HMS Ocean in 2005. After that he became Senior Naval Member of the Directing Staff at the Royal College of Defence Studies in 2007, Deputy Commander Naval Striking Forces at NATO in 2008 and Flag Officer Sea Training in 2009 before retiring in 2011.

Snow was appointed a Commander of the Order of the British Empire for his services in relation to the War in Afghanistan in October 2002. He is a Deputy Lieutenant of Devon.

Military offices
Preceded by Richard Ibbotson	Flag Officer Sea Training; 2009–2011	Succeeded by Clive Johnstone
