= D78 =

D78 may refer to:

- D. 78, Aria "Son fra l’onde" for soprano and piano, composed by Franz Schubert in 1813
- HMS Archer (D78), Long Island-class escort carrier built by the US in 1939–1940, operated by the Royal Navy during World War II
- HMS Vidette (D78), Admiralty V class destroyer of the Royal Navy
- HMS Wolverine (D78), Admiralty modified W class destroyer built for the Royal Navy
- London Underground D78 Stock, type of sub-surface rolling stock which operated on the District line of the London Underground
