= John Tolhurst =

Royal Navy Rear Admiral (born 1943)

Rear Admiral John Tolhurst CB
- Born: 22 April 1943 (age 83)
- Military career
- Allegiance: United Kingdom
- Branch: Royal Navy
- Service years: 1961–1997
- Rank: Rear Admiral
- Commands: Scotland, Northern England and Northern Ireland; HMS Invincible; HM Naval Base, Portsmouth; HMS Exeter; HMS Berwick
- Conflicts: Falklands War
- Awards: Companion of the Order of the Bath

Rear Admiral John Gordon Tolhurst, CB (born 22 April 1943) is a former Royal Navy officer who served as Flag Officer Scotland, Northern England and Northern Ireland from 1996 to 1997.

== Naval career ==
Tolhurst joined the Royal Navy in 1961. His first command was the frigate HMS Berwick: after that he was appointed Commanding Officer of the destroyer HMS Exeter in 1984, Commodore of HMS Nelson, the Naval Base at Portsmouth, in 1988, and captain of the aircraft carrier HMS Invincible in 1990. He went on to be Flag Officer Sea Training in 1992 and Flag Officer Scotland, Northern England and Northern Ireland in 1996 before retiring in 1997.

On retiring from active service, Tolhurst became senior military officer at the Defence Export Services Organisation. He subsequently set up his own defence and security consultancy business, specialising in exhibitions in those sectors. He is a Trustee of the Royal National Lifeboat Institution.

Military offices
| Preceded by Michael Boyce | Flag Officer Sea Training; 1992–1996 | Succeeded by Peter Franklyn |
| Preceded by Sir Christopher Morgan | Flag Officer Scotland, Northern England and Northern Ireland; 1996–1997 | Succeeded by Michael Gregory |
