= William Crawford (Royal Navy officer) =

Royal Navy Vice Admiral (1907–2003)

Vice-Admiral Sir William Crawford KBE CB DSC
- Born: 14 September 1907
- Died: 16 June 2003 (aged 95)
- Military career
- Allegiance: United Kingdom
- Branch: Royal Navy
- Service years: 1929–1963
- Rank: Vice-Admiral
- Commands: HMS Pelican; HMS Devonshire
- Conflicts: Second World War
- Awards: Knight Commander of the Order of the British Empire; Companion of the Order of the Bath; Distinguished Service Cross

Vice-Admiral Sir William Godfrey Crawford, KBE, CB, DSC (14 September 1907 – 16 June 2003) was a Royal Navy officer who served as Flag Officer Sea Training.

== Naval career ==
Educated at the Royal Naval College, Dartmouth, Crawford joined the Royal Navy in 1929 and saw action during the Second World War. He became commanding officer of the sloop HMS Pelican and commander of the 2nd Frigate Squadron in November 1947. He went on to be commanding officer of the cruiser HMS Devonshire in April 1952, Captain of the Royal Naval College, Dartford in August 1953 and Senior Naval Officer on the Directing Staff of the Imperial Defence College in April 1956. After that he became Flag Officer Sea Training in September 1958 and naval attaché in Washington, D.C. in November 1960 before retiring in 1963.

Crawford was appointed a Knight Commander of the Order of the British Empire in the 1961 New Year Honours and a Companion of the Order of the Bath in the 1958 Birthday Honours. He was awarded the Distinguished Service Cross on 7 June 1946.

Military offices
Preceded by New Post	Flag Officer Sea Training; 1958–1960	Succeeded by Sir Peter Gretton
