= Anthony Rix =

Royal Navy Rear Admiral (born 1956)

Rear Admiral Anthony Rix CB
- Born: 12 August 1956 (age 70)
- Military career
- Allegiance: United Kingdom
- Branch: Royal Navy
- Service years: 1975–2009
- Rank: Rear Admiral
- Commands: HMS Glasgow; HMS Marlborough
- Awards: Companion of the Order of the Bath

Rear Admiral Anthony John Rix CB (born 12 August 1956) is a former Royal Navy officer who served as Flag Officer Sea Training.

== Naval career ==
Educated at Sherborne School and Britannia Royal Naval College, Rix joined the Royal Navy in 1975. He became commanding officer of the destroyer HMS Glasgow in 1995, commanding officer of the frigate HMS Marlborough and commander of the 4th Frigate Squadron in June 1999 and Commodore, Devonport Flotilla in March 2002. He went on to be Director of Corporate Communications for the Royal Navy in January 2003, Commander United Kingdom Task Group in November 2003 and Flag Officer Sea Training in June 2006, with promotion to rear admiral on 4 July 2006. After that he became Chief of Staff to the Commander of Allied Naval Forces Southern Europe in June 2007 before retiring in 2009.

Rix was appointed a Companions of the Order of the Bath in the 2009 Birthday Honours. In retirement he became Director of Maritime Security at Salamanca Risk Management and then Business Development and Board advisor at MAST, a maritime security business.

Military offices
Preceded by Roger Ainsley	Flag Officer Sea Training; 2006–2007	Succeeded by Richard Ibbotson
