= Disappearance of Timothy MacColl =

Mysterious disappearance of a Royal Navy leading seaman

Timothy MacColl
- Born: Timothy Andrew MacColl; 1984; Killin, Stirlingshire, Scotland
- Disappeared: 27 May 2012 (aged 28); Port Rashid, Dubai, United Arab Emirates
- Status: Missing for 13 years, 11 months and 12 days
- Spouse: Rachael MacColl
- Children: 3
- Mother: Sheena MacColl
- Military career
- Allegiance: United Kingdom
- Branch: Royal Navy
- Service years: 2005–2012
- Rank: Leading seaman
- Service number: D257698W

Timothy Andrew MacColl (born 1984) was a Royal Navy leading seaman who disappeared early on the morning of 27 May 2012 in the Port Rashid area of Dubai.

His disappearance was investigated by the police in Dubai and by the Royal Navy. In 2014, the Royal Navy issued a death certificate listing death by drowning, despite there being no evidence of this and contrary to his wife's wishes.

== Disappearance ==
MacColl was serving aboard the Type 23 frigate HMS Westminster as part of the ship's seven-month security mission in the Middle East. The ship docked in Port Rashid, Dubai on 26 May 2012 and left four days after MacColl's disappearance on 31 May. MacColl spent an earlier part of the day swimming at the Seafarers Mission in Dubai before he and some of his shipmates went out drinking in the town.

The last time that MacColl was accounted for was when they were at the Rock Bottom Café in the Deira area of Bur Dubai. MacColl was put into a taxi to take him back to the ship at 2:00 am local time by some of his shipmates. The drive time between the Rock Bottom Café and where HMS Westminster was docked was about 15 minutes. He never made it on board the ship and there have been possible sightings of MacColl getting into a taxi at 3:00 am local time to head back into Bur Dubai.

== Investigation ==
The Royal Navy reported him missing later that same day. An investigation was launched by the Dubai Police Force and two Counter Terrorism Command officers from the United Kingdom were flown out to Dubai to assist in this. Members of HMS Westminster walked the route that the taxi should have taken between the Rock Bottom Café and the location of the ship's berth and also talked to local people in the area. The port area was searched by divers, dogs and helicopters with heat-seeking equipment, but nothing was found. The police in Dubai interviewed the taxi driver who dropped MacColl off at a tea shack in the port area.

Checks were made at police stations, hospitals, mortuaries, medical centres and prisons with there being no record of him. His wife Rachael said that the disappearance was completely out of character and that she had arranged to talk to her husband via Skype later on in the same day that he went missing.

MacColl never appeared in a Skype call with his wife Rachael as arranged, but she was not informed of his disappearance for 72 hours. She has criticised the Royal Navy for the delay.

MacColl's family have also been openly critical of the Royal Navy and the Foreign and Commonwealth Office's investigation into his disappearance. They say that they have often been met with a wall of silence, that no information is being passed along and that the Ministry of Defence prevented MacColl's shipmates from wearing yellow ribbons as a tribute to their missing co-worker. Rachael MacColl and Neil Cunningham (MacColl's uncle, who is a detective constable in Hampshire) flew out to Dubai in January 2013.

After the new witnesses came forward, they asked MacColl's former shipmates if they knew anything at all. Cunningham was quoted as saying "197 members of the ship's company in and around Dubai for eight days – I'm sure there's more information that can assist us and encourage the Dubai Police to carry on the investigation."

== Theories ==
The belief held by the Royal Navy is that MacColl fell into the sea near to where HMS Westminster was berthed, and drowned. This is what they have recorded on his death certificate. However, a new theory came to light when new witnesses recalled seeing another taxi turn up at the ship with MacColl getting in and returning to Dubai.

== Subsequent events ==
When HMS Westminster returned to dock in the United Kingdom at Portsmouth, the crew were instructed to leave a space when they stand on the deck as they were cheered on by family and friends. The lining of the deck, known as Procedure Alpha, is traditional when returning to port for Royal Navy ships.

In February 2013, Rachael MacColl closed down the Facebook group associated with her husband's disappearance. The group had attracted over 100,000 people and offered up lots of information, but Rachael MacColl said that it just reminded her of what she and her children had lost. By that point, it had been over a year since the family had last seen Timothy MacColl due to him setting sail for the naval mission that HMS Westminster was undertaking. Rachael MacColl described the website as having an adverse effect on all of their lives.

Two years later, in May 2014, Leading Seaman MacColl was declared dead. His death certificate lists his death as being due to drowning. His wife maintains that MacColl "is disappeared, not missing" and contested the notion that he died by drowning and disagreed with the Navy about declaring death. The Navy maintain that this was necessary to enable his wife to claim his pension, and she was also served notice that she must vacate her military Service Family Accommodation (SFA) at Gosport as she no longer had an entitlement to it, as is normal procedure for all spouses.

== See also ==
- List of people who disappeared mysteriously: post-1970
