= Alexander Backus =

Royal Navy Rear Admiral (born 1948)

Rear Admiral Alexander Backus CB OBE
- Born: 1 April 1948 (age 78)
- Military career
- Allegiance: United Kingdom
- Branch: Royal Navy
- Service years: 1966–2003
- Rank: Rear Admiral
- Commands: 6th Frigate Squadron; HMS Hermione; HMS Arethusa
- Awards: Companion of the Order of the Bath; Officer of the Order of the British Empire

Rear Admiral Alexander Kirkwood Backus, CB, OBE (born 1 April 1948) is a former Royal Navy officer who served as Flag Officer Sea Training from 1999 to 2001.

== Naval career ==
Educated at Sevenoaks School and Britannia Royal Naval College, Backus joined the Royal Navy in 1966. He became commanding officer of the frigate HMS Arethusa in 1984, Commander Sea Training in 1988 and commanding officer of the frigate HMS Hermione and commander of the 6th Frigate Squadron in December 1990.

He went on to be Commander, British Forces in the Falkland Islands in 1995, Assistant Chief of Staff (Policy) to the Commander-in-Chief Fleet in 1996 and Flag Officer Sea Training in September 1999. After that he became Flag Officer, Surface Flotilla in November 2001 and Chief of Staff (Warfare) to the Commander-in-Chief Fleet in February 2002 before retiring in June 2003.

Backus was appointed an Officer of the Order of the British Empire in the 1989 Birthday Honours, and a Companion of the Order of the Bath in the 2003 Birthday Honours.

Military offices
Preceded by John Lippiett	Flag Officer Sea Training; 1999–2001	Succeeded by James Rapp
