= Richard Ibbotson =

Royal Navy Vice Admiral (born 1954)

Vice Admiral Sir Richard Ibbotson KBE CB DSC DL
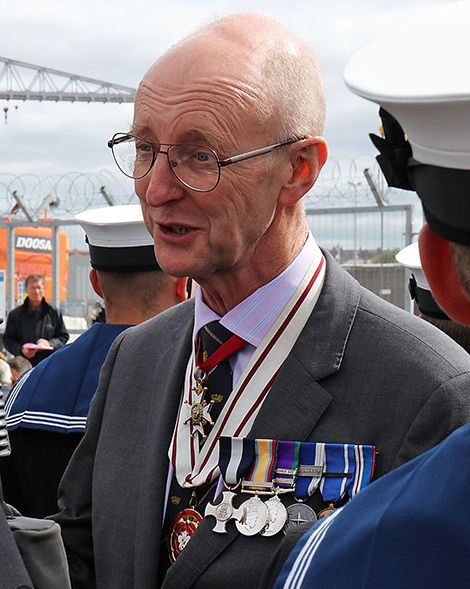
- Ibbotson in 2017
- Born: 27 June 1954 (age 72)
- Military career
- Allegiance: United Kingdom
- Branch: Royal Navy
- Service years: 1975–2011
- Rank: Vice Admiral
- Commands: Naval Secretary; Royal Naval College, Dartmouth; Falkland Islands; HMS Beaver; HMS Boxer; HMS Hurworth
- Conflicts: Gulf War
- Awards: Knight Commander of the Order of the British Empire; Companion of the Order of the Bath; Distinguished Service Cross

Vice Admiral Sir Richard Jeffrey Ibbotson, KBE, CB, DSC, DL (born 27 June 1954) is a former Royal Navy officer who served as Deputy Commander-in-Chief Fleet.

== Naval career ==
Educated at Durham University, Ibbotson joined the Royal Navy in 1975 and specialized in underwater warfare. He was promoted to lieutenant on 1 September 1977 (seniority 1 January 1977), to lieutenant commander on 1 January 1985, and was promoted to commander on 31 December 1990.

Ibbotson was given command of the mine countermeasure vessel HMS Hurworth before serving in the Gulf War in 1991 for which he was awarded the Distinguished Service Cross. He went on to command the frigate HMS Boxer before joining the Directorate of Nuclear Policy at the Ministry of Defence. He became Staff Operations Officer to the Commander United Kingdom Task Group in the Adriatic Sea and was present during the withdrawal from Hong Kong in July 1997.

Promoted to captain on 30 June 1997, he became commanding officer of the frigate HMS Beaver as well as Captain of the 1st Frigate Squadron and then served as Assistant Director, and then as Acting Director of the Directorate of Operational Capability at the Ministry of Defence, before becoming Commander of British Forces in the Falkland Islands in 2002. He was appointed Commander of the Standing Naval Force, Atlantic (STANAVFORLANT) in 2003 and Commander of the Royal Naval College, Dartmouth in 2004. He went on to be Naval Secretary in 2005, with a promotion to rear admiral on 23 June. He was appointed Flag Officer, Sea Training in 2007 and Deputy Commander-in-Chief Fleet in 2009.

He was appointed Knight Commander of the Order of the British Empire (KBE) in the 2011 New Year Honours.

Military offices
Preceded by Peter Wilkinson	Naval Secretary; 2005–2007	Succeeded by Sir Charles Montgomery
Preceded by Anthony Rix	Flag Officer Sea Training; 2007–2009	Succeeded by Christopher Snow
Preceded by Paul Boissier	Deputy Commander-in-Chief Fleet; 2009–2011	Succeeded by Sir George Zambelles
