= Roger Ainsley =

British officer

Rear Admiral Roger Ainsley
- Born: September 1950 (age 76)
- Military career
- Allegiance: United Kingdom
- Branch: Royal Navy
- Rank: Rear Admiral
- Commands: HMS Exeter; HMS Liverpool

Rear Admiral Roger Stewart Ainsley (born September 1950) is a former Royal Navy officer who served as Flag Officer Sea Training.

== Naval career ==
Ainsley became commanding officer of the destroyer HMS Exeter in 1988, commanding officer of the destroyer HMS Liverpool and commander of the 3rd Destroyer Squadron in July 1995 and Chief of Staff to the Commander, Surface Flotilla in 2000. He went on to be Commodore, Portsmouth Flotilla in March 2002 and Flag Officer Sea Training in April 2004 before retiring in June 2006.

In 2012, Ainsley attempted to become the Conservative Party candidate for the Hampshire and Isle of Wight Police and Crime Commissioner.

Military offices
Preceded by James Rapp	Flag Officer Sea Training; 2004–2006	Succeeded by Anthony Rix
