= Philip Sharp (Royal Navy officer) =

Rear-Admiral Philip Sharp CB DSC
- Born: 1913
- Died: 1988 (aged 74–75)
- Military career
- Allegiance: United Kingdom
- Branch: Royal Navy
- Service years: 1939–1967
- Rank: Rear-Admiral
- Commands: HMS Centaur
- Conflicts: Second World War
- Awards: Companion of the Order of the Bath; Distinguished Service Cross

Rear-Admiral Philip Graham Sharp CB DSC (1913–1988) is a former Royal Navy officer who served as Flag Officer Sea Training.

== Naval career ==
Sharp joined the Royal Navy in 1939 and saw action in destroyers during the Second World War. He became Captain of the Fleet for the Home Fleet in November 1960, commanding officer of the aircraft carrier HMS Centaur in June 1962 and commanding officer of HMNB Portsmouth in June 1963. He went on to be Flag Officer Sea Training in April 1965 before retiring in July 1967.

Sharp was appointed a Companion of the Order of the Bath in the 1967 New Year Honours.

Military offices
Preceded by Patrick Bayly	Flag Officer Sea Training; 1965–1967	Succeeded by John Roxburgh
