= Italian submarine Dagabur =

Italian submarine

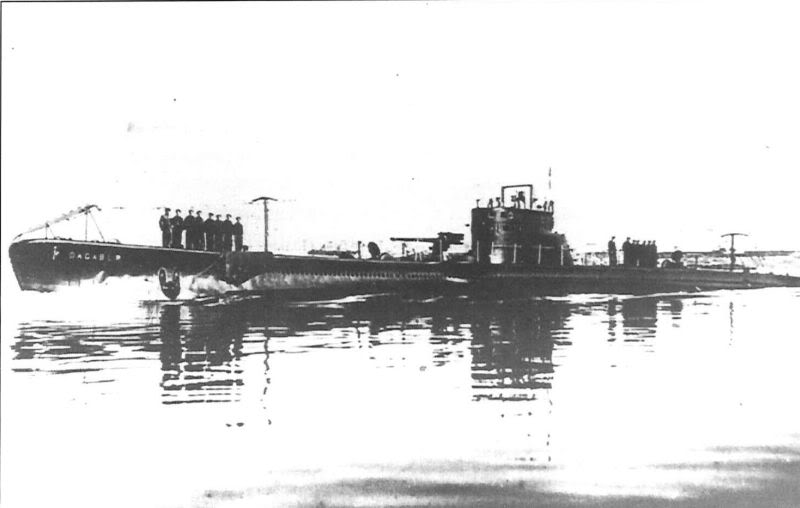
- Dagabur

History

Kingdom of Italy
- Name: Dagabur
- Namesake: Dagabur
- Builder: Tosi, Taranto
- Laid down: April 16, 1936
- Launched: November 22, 1936
- Commissioned: April 9, 1937
- Fate: Sunk, 12 August 1942

General characteristics
- Class & type: 600-Serie Adua-class submarine
- Displacement: 680 long tons (691 t) surfaced; 844 long tons (858 t) submerged
- Length: 60.28 m (197 ft 9 in)
- Beam: 6.45 m (21 ft 2 in)
- Draught: 4.64 m (15 ft 3 in)
- Installed power: 1,400 hp (1,000 kW) (diesels); 800 hp (600 kW) (electric motors)
- Propulsion: Diesel-electric; 2 × Tosi diesel engines; 2 × Marelli electric motors
- Speed: 14 knots (26 km/h; 16 mph) surfaced; 7.5 knots (13.9 km/h; 8.6 mph) submerged
- Range: 3,180 nmi (5,890 km; 3,660 mi) at 10.5 kn (19.4 km/h; 12.1 mph) surfaced; 74 nmi (137 km; 85 mi) at 4 kn (7.4 km/h; 4.6 mph) submerged.
- Test depth: 80 m (260 ft)
- Complement: 44 (4 officers + 40 non-officers and sailors)
- Armament: 1 × 100 mm (4 in) deck gun; 2 × single 13.2 mm (0.52 in) anti-aircraft guns; 6 × 533 mm (21 in) torpedo tubes (4 forward, 2 aft); 12 × torpedoes

Italian submarine Dagabur was an Adua-class submarine built for the Royal Italian Navy (Regia Marina) during the 1930s. It was named after the town of Dagabur in eastern Ethiopia. The submarine played a minor role in the Spanish Civil War of 1936–1939, supporting the Spanish Nationalists. On August 11, 1942, during World War II, Dagabur was rammed by destroyer HMS Wolverine and sank with all hands.

== Design and description ==
The Adua-class submarines were essentially repeats of the preceding Perla class. They displaced 680 long tons (690 t) surfaced and 844 long tons (858 t) submerged. The submarines were 60.18 meters (197 ft 5 in) long, had a beam of 6.45 meters (21 ft 2 in) and a draft of 4.7 meters (15 ft 5 in).

For surface running, the boats were powered by two 600-brake-horsepower (447 kW) diesel engines, each driving one propeller shaft. When submerged, each propeller was driven by a 400-horsepower (298 kW) electric motor. They could reach 14 knots (26 km/h; 16 mph) on the surface and 7.5 knots (13.9 km/h; 8.6 mph) underwater. On the surface, the Adua class had a range of 3,180 nautical miles (5,890 km; 3,660 mi) at 10.5 knots (19.4 km/h; 12.1 mph), submerged, they had a range of 74 nmi (137 km; 85 mi) at 4 knots (7.4 km/h; 4.6 mph).

The boats were armed with six internal 53.3 cm (21.0 in) torpedo tubes, four in the bow and two in the stern. One reload torpedo was carried for each tube, for a total of twelve. They were also armed with one 100 mm (4 in) deck gun for combat on the surface. The light anti-aircraft armament consisted of one or two pairs of 13.2 mm (0.52 in) machine guns.

== Construction and career ==
Dagabur was built at the Tosi shipyard in Taranto. She was laid down on 16 April 1936, launched on 22 November of the same year, and commissioned on 9 April 1937. On April 25, 1937, she was assigned to the 43rd Submarine Squadron in Taranto. During 1937, she carried out training and exercises in the Dodecanese and Libya. Between August and September of 1937, she performed three missions during the Spanish Civil War. During the first one, on August 13, 1937, Dagabur unsuccessfully attacked a ship during a patrol in the Aegean Sea. In 1938, she was reassigned to Tobruk, and in 1940, she returned to Italy and was assigned to the 46th Squadron (IV Submarine Group) based first at Taranto and then at Augusta.

After Italy's entrance into World War II, Dagabur, under the command of Captain Domenico Romano, was engaged in various defensive missions, mainly anti-submarine, in the Gulf of Taranto and off the coasts of Tunisia and Libya. She did not encounter any enemy units during these missions.

On January 1, 1941, Dagabur commenced her patrol off Cyrenaica coast, lasting until January 12, but it proved to be uneventful.

On February 19, 1941, she unsuccessfully patrolled off Malta.

On March 29, 1941, Dagabur, along with two other submarines, was sent to patrol between Alexandria and Cape Krio. These three submarines were a part of the screening force covering the main Italian battle formation involved in Operation "Gaudo". At 20:27 on March 30, Dagabur sighted in position 33°47′N 25°24′E light cruiser HMS Bonaventure escorting, along with three destroyers, two transports. Being in an ideal position for attack, at 20:37, she launched two torpedoes, and heard two strong explosions. There was no news of the result of this attack, and it's likely the cruiser was damaged, but hours later, HMS Bonaventure was torpedoed again, this time, by the submarine Ambra and sunk with a loss of 23 officers and 115 other members of the crew.

On December 14, 1941, Dagabur, now under the command of Captain Alberto Torri, intercepted while surfaced, and launched two torpedoes at an unknown unit, and immediately disengaged by diving. From the British documentation, it was later learned that the unit attacked was the British submarine Talisman, which did not sustain any damage and it reacted with the launch of two torpedoes and deck gunfire, but also with no results.

At the beginning of August 1942, Dagabur, now under the command of Captain Renato Pecori, left Cagliari and was sent to patrol an area between Ibiza and Mallorca and the northern coast of Algeria. On August 10, 1942, she was ordered to report sightings of enemy units, but not attack any ships until after the start of the British Operation "Pedestal". On August 11, 1942, she sighted the British Force, part of Operation "Bellows", including the British aircraft carrier HMS Furious and eight destroyers south of the Balearic Islands. Dagabur attempted to maneuver into approach on the surface but was spotted and attacked and rammed by the destroyer HMS Wolverine and sank with all hands in position 37°18′N 1°58′E on August 12. HMS Wolverine was also damaged in the collision, and had to be escorted back to Gibraltar for repairs.
