= James Rapp =

British naval officer (1952– )

Rear Admiral James Rapp CB
- Born: May 1952 (age 74)
- Military career
- Allegiance: United Kingdom
- Branch: Royal Navy
- Rank: Rear Admiral
- Commands: HMS Brazen; HMS Brilliant; HMS Cornwall
- Awards: Companion of the Order of the Bath

Rear Admiral James Campsie Rapp CB (born May 1952) is a former Royal Navy officer who served as Flag Officer Sea Training.

== Naval career ==
Educated at Ampleforth College and Britannia Royal Naval College, Rapp was Navigating Officer of HMS Bronington when Lieutenant The Prince of Wales was in command in 1976. He commanded the frigate HMS Brazen from 1989, deploying to the Gulf for the first Gulf War and later became commanding officer of the frigate HMS Brilliant in July 1993. His time in command included the production of a BBC documentary about the ship directed by Chris Terrill. He later became commanding officer of the frigate HMS Cornwall, then commander of the 2nd Frigate Squadron in May 1998 and Flag Officer Sea Training in November 2001, serving until April 2004. Prior to retirement Rapp became director general of Trafalgar 200 for which he was appointed Companion of the Order of the Bath in the 2006 New Year Honours.

After retirement Rapp became senior naval advisor to CAE Inc., a Canadian manufacturer of simulation technologies.

Military offices
Preceded by Alexander Backus	Flag Officer Sea Training; 2001–2004	Succeeded by Roger Ainsley
