= Ben Key =

Royal Navy officer (born 1965)

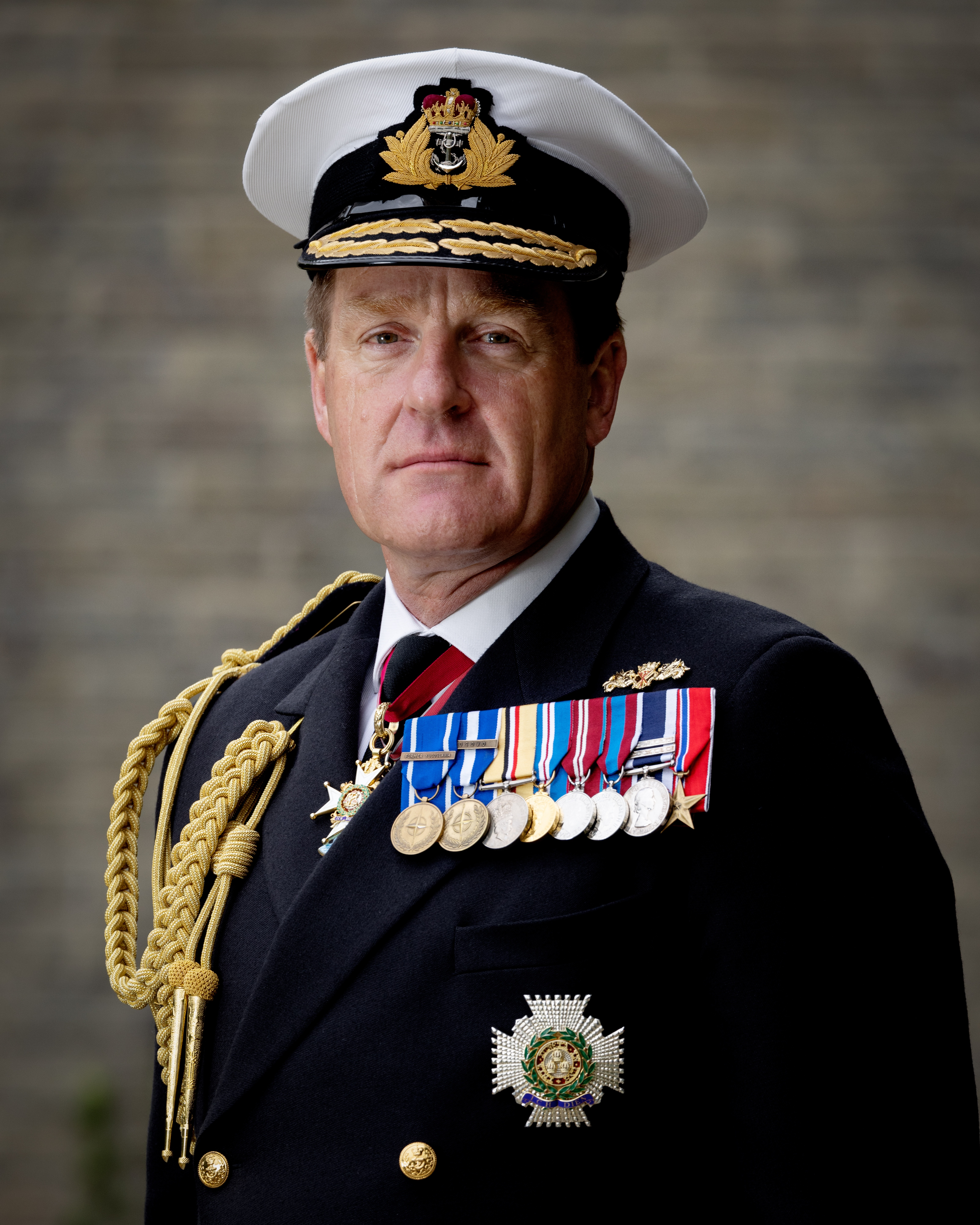
- Key in 2022
- Born: 7 November 1965 (age 60)
- Education: Royal Holloway, University of London; Britannia Royal Naval College
- Military career
- Allegiance: United Kingdom
- Branch: Royal Navy
- Service years: 1984–2025
- Rank: Admiral (until 2025)
- Service number: C031724D
- Commands: First Sea Lord; Chief of Joint Operations; Fleet Commander; HMS Illustrious; HMS Lancaster; HMS Iron Duke; HMS Sandown
- Conflicts: Kosovo War; Iraq War
- Awards: Bronze Star Medal (United States)

Benjamin John Key (born 7 November 1965) is a former Royal Navy officer, who served as First Sea Lord from November 2021 to May 2025. On 2 July 2025, the Ministry of Defence announced that Key's service and commission had been terminated following an investigation into allegations of inappropriate behaviour, which found him to have "fallen far short of the values and standards expected of service personnel".

Key had commanded HM Ships Sandown, Iron Duke, Lancaster, and Illustrious, and deployed on operations to Kosovo and Iraq. He was appointed Fleet Commander in 2016, and the Chief of Joint Operations in 2019.

== Early life and education ==
Key was born on 7 November 1965. He was educated at Bromsgrove School, a private school in Bromsgrove, Worcestershire. He studied physics at Royal Holloway, University of London, graduating with a Bachelor of Science (BSc) degree in 1988.

== Naval career ==
Key joined the Royal Navy in 1984. After serving as an observer in the Fleet Air Arm, he saw action as a Principal Warfare Officer in the frigate HMS Somerset during the Kosovo War in 1999. After briefly serving as commanding officer of the minehunter HMS Sandown, he became commanding officer of the frigate HMS Iron Duke in 2000 and HMS Lancaster in 2001. He went on to be a staff officer in the Directorate of Naval Resources and Plans at the Ministry of Defence in 2003, then Advisor to the Director Joint Staff in the Iraqi Joint Headquarters in 2006. Following promotion to captain on 30 June 2006, he was appointed a staff officer at the Permanent Joint Headquarters in Northwood in 2007. After that he became commanding officer of the aircraft carrier HMS Illustrious in February 2009, Commodore Joint Air Maritime Organisation in February 2010 and Director of Naval Plans and Resources at the Ministry of Defence in May 2011.

Key was appointed Principal Staff Officer to the Chief of the Defence Staff in November 2011, and Flag Officer Sea Training in April 2013. He was appointed Fleet Commander and promoted to the rank of vice admiral on 10 February 2016. He became Chief of Joint Operations in April 2019.

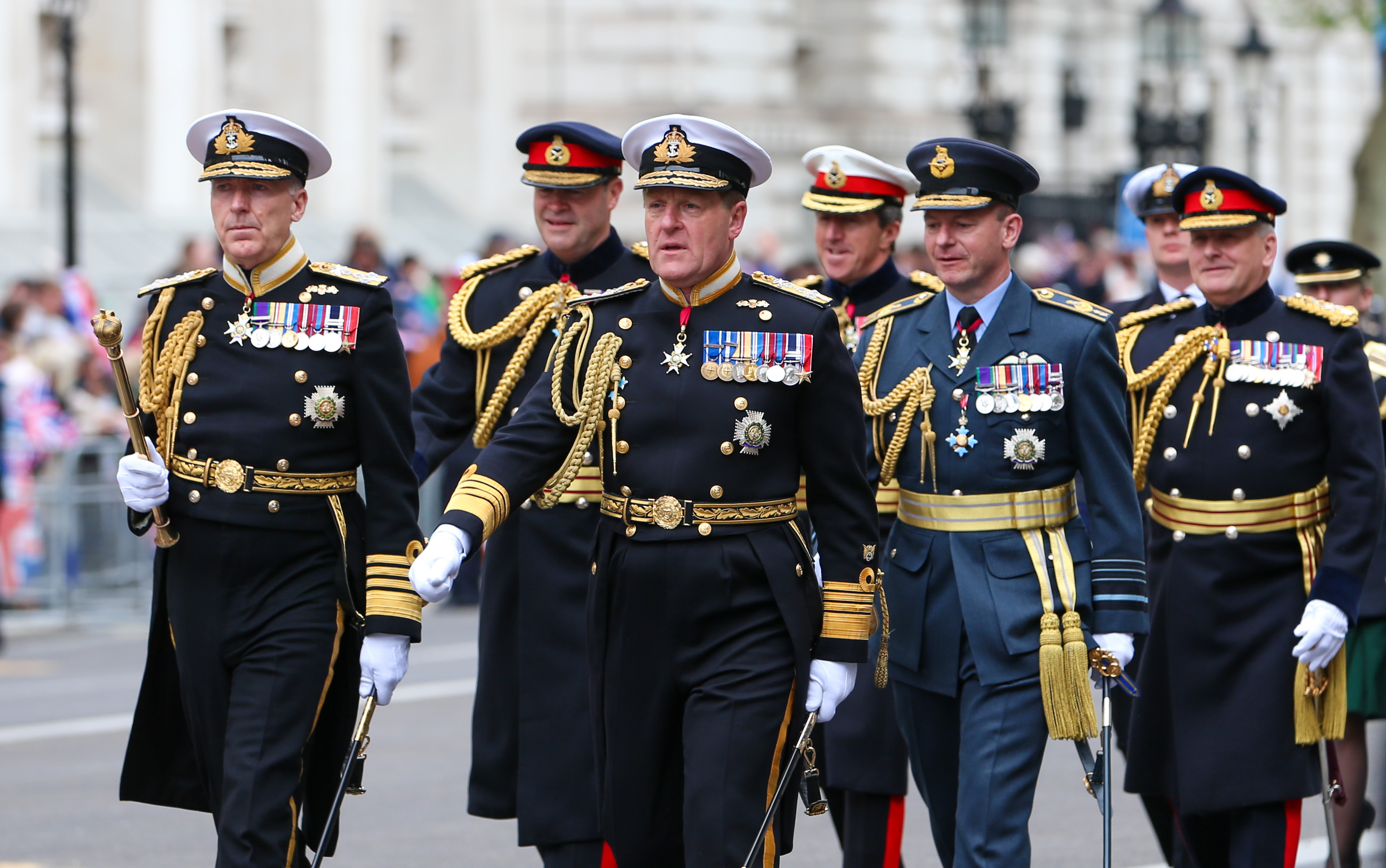
Key (centre) with other defence chiefs during the Coronation Procession of Charles III, May 2023

Key received the United States Bronze Star Medal in 2006, and was appointed Commander of the Order of the British Empire (CBE) in the 2016 New Year Honours, and Knight Commander of the Order of the Bath (KCB) in the 2021 New Year Honours. He was awarded the Honorary degree of Doctor of Science (D.Sc) by Royal Holloway, University of London on 20 December 2018.

Key led Operation Pitting, the UK's evacuation efforts in Afghanistan following the 2021 Taliban offensive, in August 2021 and, on 15 October, it was announced that Key was to be the next First Sea Lord. He assumed the post from Admiral Sir Tony Radakin on 8 November 2021.

On 9 May 2025, it was reported that Key had attempted to resign, citing personal reasons, but that his resignation had been rejected and that he was under investigation for engaging in a personal relationship with a subordinate.

On 2 July 2025, the Ministry of Defence announced that, following the investigation, Key's Royal Navy service and commission had been terminated. The BBC reported that Key had violated the military's code of conduct by having an affair with a more junior female officer.

On 1 October 2026, Key's appointments as a Knight Commander of the Order of the Bath (KCB) and Commander of the Order of the British Empire (CBE) were annulled following his resignation and the investigation.

== Personal life ==
In 1994, Key married Elly. They have two sons and one daughter.

== Honours and decorations ==

Ribbon	Description	Notes
	NATO Medal for the former Yugoslavia	
	NATO Medal for Kosovo	1999
	Iraq Medal	2006
	Queen Elizabeth II Golden Jubilee Medal	6 February 2002
	Queen Elizabeth II Diamond Jubilee Medal	6 February 2012
	Queen Elizabeth II Platinum Jubilee Medal	6 February 2022
	King Charles III Coronation Medal	6 May 2023
	Naval Long Service and Good Conduct Medal (1848)	With 2 Bars
	Bronze Star Medal	Awarded in 2006

Military offices
Preceded by Clive Johnstone	Flag Officer Sea Training; 2013–2015	Succeeded by John Clink
Preceded by Sir Philip Jones	Fleet Commander and Deputy Chief of the Naval Staff; 2016–2019	Succeeded by Jerry Kyd
Preceded by Tim Fraser	Chief of Joint Operations; 2019–2021	Succeeded by Charles Stickland
Preceded by Sir Tony Radakin	First Sea Lord and Chief of the Naval Staff; 2021–2025	Succeeded by Sir Gwyn Jenkins
