= Patrick Bayly =

British military officer (1914–1998)

Vice-Admiral Sir Patrick Bayly KBE CB DSC & Two Bars
- Born: 4 August 1914
- Died: 1 May 1998 (aged 83)
- Military career
- Allegiance: United Kingdom
- Branch: Royal Navy
- Service years: 1932–1970
- Rank: Vice-Admiral
- Commands: Royal Naval College, Greenwich; 6th Destroyer Squadron
- Conflicts: Second World War: Battle of the Mediterranean; Korean War
- Awards: Knight Commander of the Order of the British Empire; Companion of the Order of the Bath; Distinguished Service Cross & Two Bars; Legion of Merit (United States)

Vice-Admiral Sir Patrick Uniacke Bayly, KBE, CB, DSC & Two Bars (4 August 1914 – 1 May 1998) was a Royal Navy officer who became President of the Royal Naval College, Greenwich.

== Naval career ==
Born the son of Lancelot Francis Sanderson Bayly and educated at the Royal Naval College, Dartmouth, Bayly joined the Royal Navy in 1932 and served in the Second World War in combined operations in the Mediterranean area. After serving in the Korean War he became Commander of the 6th Destroyer Squadron in 1958, joined the staff of the Supreme Allied Commander Atlantic in 1960 and then became Chief of Staff, Mediterranean Fleet in 1962. He went on to be Flag Officer Sea Training in 1963, President of the Royal Naval College, Greenwich in 1965 and Chief of Staff, Allied Naval Forces Southern Europe in 1967 before retiring in 1970.

== Later life ==
In retirement, Bayly was Director of The Maritime Trust. He died on 1 May 1998, aged 83.

== Honours and decorations ==
Bayly was awarded the Distinguished Service Cross (DSC) on three occasions. This was shown with the addition of two bars to his medal. On 19 May 1953, he was awarded the DSC for a third time "for distinguished service in operations in Korean waters". He was awarded the Legion of Merit (Degree of Legionnaire) by the President of the United States of America "for distinguished services during the operations in Korea". In February 1955, he was granted unrestricted permission to wear the medal. In the 1965 New Year Honours, he was appointed Companion of the Order of the Bath (CB). In the 1968 Queen's Birthday Honours, he was appointed Knight Commander of the Order of the British Empire (KBE).

Military offices
Preceded by Horace Law	Flag Officer Sea Training; 1963–1965	Succeeded by Philip Sharp
Preceded by Sir Ian McGeoch	President, Royal Naval College, Greenwich; 1965–1967	Succeeded by Sir Horace Lyddon
