= Peter Franklyn =

Former Royal Navy officer

Rear Admiral Peter Franklyn CB MVO
- Born: 10 September 1946 (age 80)
- Military career
- Allegiance: United Kingdom
- Branch: Royal Navy
- Service years: 1963–2000
- Rank: Rear Admiral
- Commands: Commander United Kingdom Task Group; School of Maritime Operations; HMS Bristol; HMS Active
- Awards: Companion of the Order of the Bath; Member of the Royal Victorian Order

Rear Admiral Peter Michael Franklyn, CB, MVO (born 10 September 1946) is a former Royal Navy officer who served as Flag Officer Sea Training from 1996 to 1997.

== Naval career ==
Educated at King's College, Taunton, Franklyn joined the Royal Navy in 1963. He became commanding officer of the frigate HMS Active in 1980, Training Commander at Britannia Royal Naval College in 1982 and Staff Officer, Operations to the Flag Officer, 3rd Flotilla in 1982. He went on to be Naval Assistant to the First Sea Lord in August 1986, commanding officer of the destroyer HMS Bristol in August 1988 and Captain of the School of Maritime Operations in January 1992. After that he became Director of Naval Officers' Appointments (seamen) in 1993, Commander United Kingdom Task Group in December 1994 and Flag Officer Sea Training in April 1996. He finally became Flag Officer, Surface Flotilla in July 1997, before retiring in April 2000.

Franklyn was appointed a Member of the Royal Victorian Order in the 1978 New Year Honours, and a Companion of the Order of the Bath in the 1999 Birthday Honours.

Military offices
Preceded by John Tolhurst	Flag Officer Sea Training; 1996–1997	Succeeded by John Lippiett
