= Peter Gretton =

Royal Navy Vice Admiral (1912–1992)

Vice-Admiral Sir Peter Gretton KCB DSO** OBE DSC
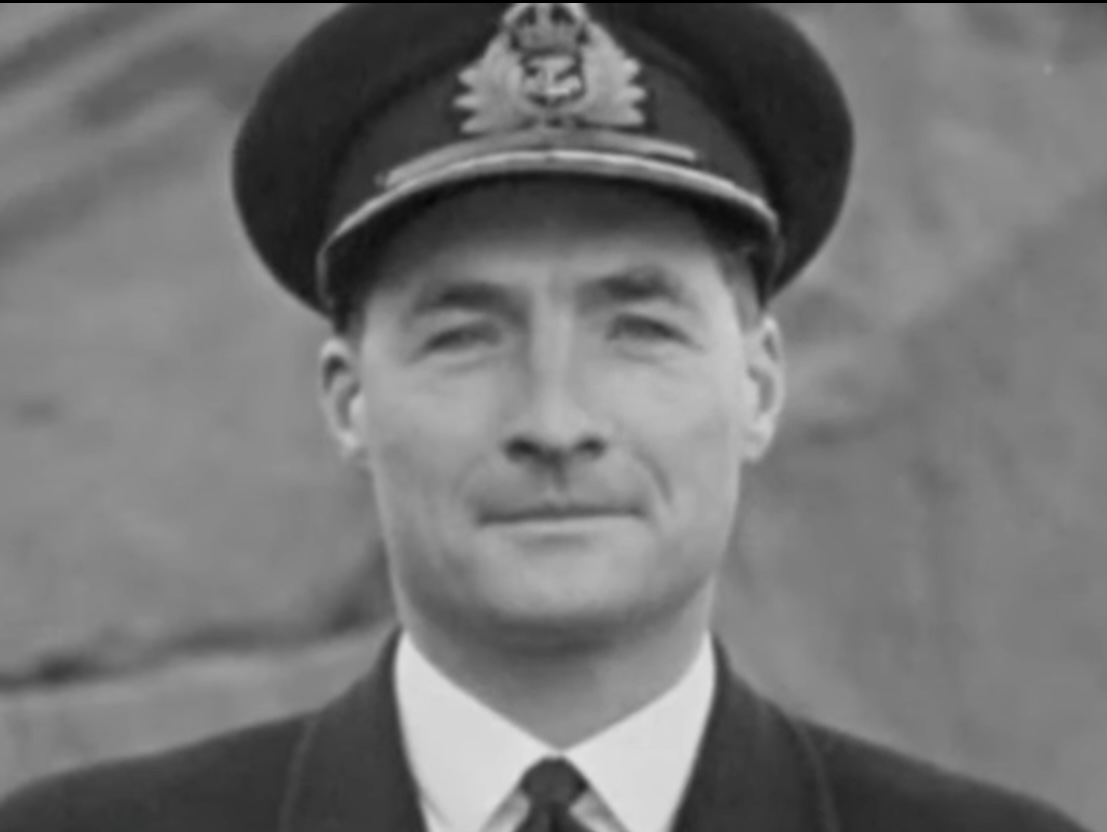
- Sir Peter Gretton
- Born: 27 August 1912; Farnham, Surrey
- Died: 11 November 1992 (aged 80); Oxford, Oxfordshire
- Military career
- Allegiance: United Kingdom
- Branch: Royal Navy
- Service years: 1930–1963
- Rank: Vice-Admiral
- Commands: Fifth Sea Lord (1962–63); Flag Officer Sea Training (1960–61); HMS Saker (1954–55); HMS Gambia (1952–53); HMS Chelmer (1943–44); HMS Vidette (1943); HMS Duncan (1943); HMS Wolverine (1942); HMS Sabre (1941–42)
- Conflicts: Abyssinia crisis Arab rebellion in Palestine; Second World War: Norwegian Campaign; Battles of Narvik; Operation Pedestal; Battle of the Atlantic
- Awards: Knight Commander of the Order of the Bath; Distinguished Service Order & Two Bars; Officer of the Order of the British Empire; Distinguished Service Cross; Mentioned in Despatches
- Other work: Domestic Bursar of University College, Oxford; Senior Research Fellow; President of the Royal Humane Society

Vice-Admiral Sir Peter William Gretton, KCB, DSO**, OBE, DSC (27 August 1912 – 11 November 1992) was an officer in the Royal Navy. He was active in the Battle of the Atlantic during the Second World War, and was a successful convoy escort commander. He eventually rose to become Fifth Sea Lord and retired as a vice admiral before entering university life as a bursar and academic.

== Early career ==
Gretton joined the Royal Navy as a cadet at the Royal Naval College, Dartmouth, Dartmouth. He served in the aircraft carrier Courageous before seeing action in the cruiser HMS Durban during the Abyssinia crisis and the Spanish Civil War. He led a landing party in Haifa during the Arab rebellion in Palestine. He attended an anti-submarine course at Portland and, on the outbreak of the Second World War, was assigned to the destroyer HMS Vega as first lieutenant.

== Second World War ==
After a short period as first lieutenant in the old destroyer HMS Vega, from September 1939 to April 1940, Gretton was appointed at very short notice as first lieutenant in the large modern destroyer HMS Cossack and saw action at the Second Battle of Narvik during the Norwegian Campaign. He was given command of the old destroyer HMS Sabre in 1941 and served in the North Atlantic. Promoted to lieutenant-commander on 1 June 1942, he was given command of the marginally newer destroyer HMS Wolverine and returned to the Mediterranean. He took part in Operation Pedestal, the Malta convoy operation in August 1942, and sank the Italian submarine Dagabur by ramming.

=== Escort Group B7 ===
Promoted to commander on 31 December 1942, he was given command of Escort Group B7 as Senior Officer Escort, based in Derry. As his flagship (the destroyer HMS Duncan) was still being refitted, he initially embarked on the frigate HMS Tay. He assumed command of HMS Duncan on 7 April 1942 when Escort Group B7 arrived in Derry after covering Convoy HX 231. From 22 April 1943 to 6 May 1943, Commander Gretton led Escort Group B7 in covering Convoy ONS 5, considered to be the turning point of the Battle of the Atlantic. On the return voyage Commander Gretton and Escort Group B7 successfully covered Convoy SC 130, with no losses to enemy action and an on-time arrival that allowed his wedding to happen as scheduled.

Gretton continued in command of Escort Group B7 until the summer of 1944, when it was disbanded as part of the preparations for Operation Neptune, the naval portion of the Normandy invasion. His next posting was to the Admiralty plans division, where he worked from 1944 to 1946.

== Post war ==
Promoted to captain on 30 June 1948, Gretton became naval assistant to the First Sea Lord and then chief of staff to the senior naval officer at the Joint Services Mission in Washington, D.C., before being given command of the Naval task group for Operation Grapple in 1956. Promoted to rear-admiral on 7 July 1958, he became Senior Naval Member of the Directing Staff at the Imperial Defence College in 1958 and Flag Officer Sea Training in 1960. Promoted to vice-admiral on 10 March 1961, he went on to be Deputy Chief of the Naval Staff and Fifth Sea Lord in 1962. He retired due to ill-health in May 1963.

Gretton served as the domestic bursar of University College, Oxford, from 1965 until 1971, and became a senior research fellow in 1971. He published widely on defence matters and was the president of the Royal Humane Society. He died on 11 November 1992 at the age of 80.

Gretton was featured talking about his wartime experience on the World at War documentary series, where he appears in Episode 10 "Wolf Pack: U-Boats in the Atlantic (1939–1944)" which was first screened on 9 January 1974.

== Personal life ==
In 1943 he married Dorothy N. G. "Judy" Du Vivier. They had three sons and one daughter.

== Works ==
- Convoy escort commander (1964; memoirs)
- Maritime strategy: a study of British defence problems (1965)
- Former Naval Person: Churchill and the navy (1968) (published as Winston Churchill and the Royal Navy in the US, 1969.)
- Crisis convoy: the story of HX231. Peter Davies. 1974. ISBN 0-4320-6340-4.
- El Factor Olvidado: La Marina Británica y la Guerra Civil Española. Editorial San Martín (published in Spanish from Admiral Gretton manuscripts), 1984. ISBN 84-7140-224-6.

== Honours ==
Gretton was awarded the Distinguished Service Cross in 1936 for service during the Arab rebellion in Palestine, and was mentioned in dispatches in 1940 after the Second Battle of Narvik. He was appointed an Officer of the Order of the British Empire in the 1941 Birthday Honours. He received the Distinguished Service Order and Two Bars; the first in 1942 for Operation Pedestal; the second in 1943 for the defence of ONS 5; and the third in late 1943 for the actions as support group leader.

For his postwar career he was appointed a Companion of the Order of the Bath in the 1960 New Year Honours and advanced to Knight Commander of the Order of the Bath in the 1963 New Year Honours.

Military offices
Preceded by William Crawford	Flag Officer Sea Training; 1960–1961	Succeeded by Horace Law
Preceded by Sir Laurence Durlacher	Fifth Sea Lord; 1962–1963	Succeeded by Sir Frank Hopkins
