= John Lippiett =

Former Royal Navy admiral

Rear Admiral John Lippiett CB CBE DL
- Born: Richard John Lippiett; 7 July 1949 (age 77)
- Military career
- Allegiance: United Kingdom
- Branch: Royal Navy
- Service years: 1967–2003
- Rank: Rear admiral
- Commands: HMS Amazon; HMS Norfolk
- Conflicts: Falklands War
- Awards: Companion of the Order of the Bath; Commander of the Order of the British Empire

Rear Admiral Richard John Lippiett, CB, CBE, DL (born 7 July 1949) is a retired senior Royal Navy officer who became Commandant of the Joint Services Command and Staff College.

== Early life and education ==
Lippiett was born on 7 July 1949. He was educated at Brighton, Hove and Sussex Grammar School.

== Naval career ==
Lippiett joined the Royal Navy in 1967. He served in the Falklands War as executive officer of HMS Ambuscade. He was appointed captain of the frigate HMS Amazon in 1986, naval assistant to the First Sea Lord in 1988 and Commanding Officer of the frigate HMS Norfolk as well as Captain of the 9th Frigate Squadron in 1991.

He went on to be Chief of Staff for the surface flotilla in 1993, commodore at the School of Maritime Operations in 1995 and Flag Officer Sea Training in 1997. After that he became Chief of Staff to the Commander of Allied Naval Forces Southern Europe in 1999 and Commandant of the Joint Services Command and Staff College in 2002 before retiring in 2003.

== Later life ==
In retirement he became chief executive of the Mary Rose Trust. He is also the Patron of The Nautical Training Corps.

Between June 2016 and July 2025, Lippiett was a director on the board of trustees at Chichester Festival Theatre, where he chaired its development committee.

== Honours ==
Already a Member of the Order of the British Empire (MBE), Lippiett was appointed Commander of the Order of the British Empire (CBE) in the 2014 New Year Honours for services to British heritage with the Mary Rose Trust. He was appointed Companion of the Order of the Bath (CB) in the 2004 New Year Honours.

Military offices
| Preceded by Peter Franklyn | Flag Officer Sea Training; 1997–1999 | Succeeded by Alexander Backus |
| Preceded by Brian Burridge | Commandant of the Joint Services Command and Staff College; 2002–2003 | Succeeded by John McColl |
