= HMS Wolverine (D78) =

Destroyer of the Royal Navy

- HMS Wolverine in 1944

History

United Kingdom
- Name: HMS Wolverine
- Ordered: April 1918
- Builder: James Samuel White & Co Ltd
- Laid down: 8 October 1918
- Launched: 17 July 1919
- Commissioned: 27 February 1920
- Out of service: To reserve May 1945; Disposal List September 1945
- Stricken: sold for scrap 28 January 1946
- Identification: Pennant numbers D78 and I78
- Motto: Avidus laboris gloriae – "Greedy of work, greedy of labour"
- Honours and awards: Martinique 1808; Dardanelles 1915–16; Atlantic 1939–45; Norway 1940; Malta Convoys 1942
- Fate: Scrapped 1946
- Badge: On a Field White, on a mount Green, a Wolverine proper.

General characteristics
- Class & type: Admiralty modified W-class destroyer
- Displacement: 1,140 tons standard; 1,550 tons full load
- Length: 300 feet (91 m) o/a, 312 feet (95 m) p/p
- Beam: 29.5 feet (9.0 m)
- Draught: 9 feet (2.7 m), 11.25 feet (3.43 m) under full load
- Propulsion: Yarrow type Water-tube boilers, Brown-Curtis geared steam turbines, 2 shafts, 27,000 shp
- Speed: 34 knots (63 km/h)
- Range: 320-370 tons oil; 3,500 nmi (6,480 km) at 15 knots (28 km/h); 900 nmi (1,670 km) at 32 knots (59 km/h)
- Complement: 127
- Sensors & processing systems: Type 286M Air Warning Radar fitted 1941; Type 271 Target Indication Radar fitted 1942
- Armament: As built 1920: 4 × BL 4.7 in (120-mm) Mk.I guns, mount P Mk.I; 2 × QF 2 pdr Mk.II "pom-pom" (40 mm L/39); 6 × 21-inch torpedo tubes (2×3); 1942 SRE conversion: 3 × BL 4.7 in (120mm) Mk.I L/45 guns; 1 × QF 12 pounder 12 cwt naval gun; 2 × QF 2 pdr Mk.II "pom-pom" (40mm L/39); 3 × 21-inch torpedo tubes (1×3); 2 × depth charge racks; Hedgehog anti-submarine mortar (replaced 'A' turret 1942)

Service record
- Operations: World War II
- Victories: Dagabur; U-76

HMS Wolverine was an Admiralty modified W-class destroyer built for the Royal Navy. She was one of four destroyers ordered in April 1918 from James Samuel White & Co Ltd under the 14th Order for Destroyers of the Emergency War Programme of 1917–1918. She was the seventh Royal Navy Ship to carry the name. It had been introduced in 1798 for a gun brig and last borne by a destroyer sunk after a collision in 1917.

== Construction ==
Wolverine's keel was laid on 8 October 1918 at the James Samuel White & Co. Ltd. Shipyard in Cowes, Isle of Wight. She was launched on 17 July 1919. She was 312 feet (95 m) overall in length with a beam of 29.5 feet (9.0 m). Her mean draught was9 feet (2.7 m), and would reach 11.25 feet (3.43 m) under full load. She had a displacement of 1,140 tons standard and up to 1,550 full load.

She was propelled by three White-Foster type water-tube boilers powering Parsons geared steam turbines developing 27,000 shaft horsepower (20,000 kW) driving two screws for a maximum designed speed of 34 knots (63 km/h; 39 mph). She was oil-fired and had a bunkerage of 320 to 370 long tons (330 to 380 t). This gave a range of between 3,500 nautical miles (6,500 km; 4,000 mi) at 15 knots (28 km/h; 17 mph) and 900 nautical miles (1,700 km; 1,000 mi) at 32 knots (59 km/h; 37 mph).

She shipped four BL 4.7 in (120 mm) Mk.I guns, mount P Mk.I naval guns in four single center-line turrets. The turrets were disposed as two forward and two aft in super imposed firing positions. She also carried two QF 2 pdr Mk.II "pom-pom" (40 mm L/39) mounted abeam between the funnels. Abaft of the second funnel she carried six 21 in (530 mm) torpedo tubes in two triple mounts on the centreline.

== Inter-war period ==
Wolverine was commissioned into the Royal Navy on 27 January 1920 with the pennant number D78. After commissioning she was assigned to the 3rd Destroyer Flotilla of the Atlantic Fleet. The Flotilla served in Home waters in the early 1920s. The Flotilla was first assigned to the Mediterranean where Wolverine helped to evacuate Greek civilians from Turkey. In 1926 the ship was reassigned to the China Station.

In early 1930s she underwent a refit and was placed in reserve as more modern destroyers came into service. Wolverine was laid-up in Maintenance Reserve at Rosyth with a special complement. She was reactivated, manned by Reservists, for a Royal Review at Weymouth in August 1939. With war looming, she was retained in service and brought to war readiness.

== Second World War ==
In September 1939 Wolverine was allocated to the 15th Destroyer Flotilla at Rosyth for East Coast convoy defence. On 5 September she deployed with HMS Witherington, HMS Volunteer and HMS Vimy as escort for convoy GC1 from Milford Haven. She was based at Milford Haven and engaged in convoy escort duty in the English Channel and South-West Approaches. During this period she escorted 19 convoys, one of which was attacked.

In April 1940 she was transferred to the Home Fleet for the Norwegian campaign for convoy defence and support. On 14 May she deployed with HMS Stork to escort the Polish troopship MS Chrobry as she delivered reinforcements and AA guns to Bodø. Under heavy and sustained air attack, Chrobry received three hits. Wolverine embarked nearly 700 soldiers from the burning troopship, including the Irish Guards, while Stork provided air defence. These troops were delivered to Harstad. At this time her pennant number was changed to I72 for visual signalling purposes.

In June she was involved in the evacuation of France, assisting in the evacuation of the Biscay ports, an action known as Operation Aerial.

In August 1940 Wolverine returned to convoy escort duty, joining the 6th Escort Group for escort duty in the North-West Approaches. In this role she was engaged in all the duties performed by escort ships; protecting convoys, searching for and attacking U-boats, and rescuing survivors. She operated in this role the next 21 months. She escorted 27 North Atlantic convoys, 10 of which were attacked, and was involved in two major battles there.

In March 1941 she was leader of the escort group for Convoy OB 293 which was attacked by a U-boat pack. The escorts were able to drive this attack off, destroying U-70 in the process. She made an attack on a contact, an attack which was believed to have resulted in the destruction of U-47; this assessment was revised later, and Wolverine is believed to have hit UA, which escaped with damage. HMS Wolverine had made an earlier attack on a submarine at 0510hrs 7 March 1941, 5 minutes after U-47's last known torpedo attack on the Whale Factory Ship, Terje Viken. Nothing further was heard from U-47 after this time.

In April 1941 Wolverine deployed with HMS Scarborough and HMS Arbutus, the escort force for Convoy SC 26. Under sustained attacks by U-46, U-74 and U-73 six ships were sunk and several others were damaged. On 5 April, after sonar contact was made, Wolverine and Scarborough depth-charged U-76 to the surface. U-76 sank by the stern after her crew was rescued.

In February 1942 Wolverine was converted to a short-range escort (SRE). To augment the earlier changes, the replacement of the after bank of torpedo tubes with a single QF 12-pounder 12 cwt naval gun and the landing of 'Y' gun for additional space for depth charge gear and stowage, the 2-pounder "pompoms" were replaced with two Oerlikon 20 mm cannons amidships and the 'A' gun was replaced with a Hedgehog anti-submarine mortar. A Type 271 target indication radar was added on the bridge to augment the Type 286M air warning radar. In April she undertook training and practice under her new captain, Commander P W Gretton (promoted to Vice Admiral and knighted after the war).

In July she moved to Gibraltar for operations in the Mediterranean. In August Wolverine took part in Operation Pedestal. While escorting HMS Furious she detected a submarine on the surface. She carried out a ramming attack and sank submarine Dagabur. She suffered major bow damage and her port turbine was disabled. She returned to Gibraltar under her own power for temporary repair, followed by several months in dock at Devonport. During her stay at Gibraltar she escorted six Gibraltar and six South Atlantic convoys, three of which were attacked.

After repairs completed in December she was employed in Western Approaches convoy defence duties. She served mainly on local escort assignments until her transfer to Freetown, South Africa in February 1943. She remained on station performing convoy escort duties until January when she returned to the UK for a refit. During this period she escorted 17 convoys, two of which were attacked.

In January 1944 Wolverine returned to Britain for a refit, before returning to escort duty with Western Approaches. In January 1945 she was engaged in anti-submarine patrols in the Channel and Southwest Approaches, where she continued to the end of the war in Europe. In May she was withdrawn from operational service, paid off into reserve pending a decision on disposal.

== Disposition ==
Wolverine was placed on the disposal list after VJ-day and sold for scrapping on 28 January 1946 to West of Scotland Shipbreakers. She was towed to the breaker's yard at Troon in September 1946.

== Bibliography ==
- Blair, Clay (1996). Hitler's U-Boat War. Vol. I. ISBN 0-304-35260-8.
- Campbell, John (1985). Naval Weapons of World War II. Annapolis, Maryland: Naval Institute Press. ISBN 0-87021-459-4.
- Chesneau, Roger, ed. (1980). Conway's All the World's Fighting Ships 1922–1946. Greenwich, UK: Conway Maritime Press. ISBN 0-85177-146-7.
- Colledge, J. J.; Warlow, Ben (2006) [1969]. Ships of the Royal Navy: The Complete Record of All Fighting Ships of the Royal Navy from the 15th Century to the Present (3rd Rev ed.). London: Chatham Publishing. ISBN 978-1-86176-281-8. OCLC 67375475.
- Cocker, Maurice. Destroyers of the Royal Navy, 1893–1981. Ian Allan. ISBN 0-7110-1075-7.
- Friedman, Norman (2009). British Destroyers From Earliest Days to the Second World War. Annapolis, Maryland: Naval Institute Press. ISBN 978-1-59114-081-8.
- Gardiner, Robert & Gray, Randal, eds. (1985). Conway's All the World's Fighting Ships 1906–1921. Annapolis, Maryland: Naval Institute Press. ISBN 0-85177-245-5.
- Gretton, Paul (1956). Convoy Escort Commander.
- Kemp, Paul (1997). U-Boats Destroyed. ISBN 1-85409-515-3.
- Lenton, H. T. (1998). British & Empire Warships of the Second World War. Annapolis, Maryland: Naval Institute Press. ISBN 1-55750-048-7.
- March, Edgar J. (1966). British Destroyers: A History of Development, 1892–1953; Drawn by Admiralty Permission From Official Records & Returns, Ships' Covers & Building Plans. London: Seeley Service. OCLC 164893555.
- Niestle, Axel (1998). German U-Boat Losses during World War II. ISBN 1-85367-352-8.
- Preston, Antony (1971). 'V & W' Class Destroyers 1917–1945. London: Macdonald. OCLC 464542895.
- Raven, Alan & Roberts, John (1979). 'V' and 'W' Class Destroyers. Man o'War. Vol. 2. London: Arms & Armour. ISBN 0-85368-233-X.
- Rohwer, Jürgen (2005). Chronology of the War at Sea 1939–1945: The Naval History of World War Two (Third Revised ed.). Annapolis, Maryland: Naval Institute Press. ISBN 1-59114-119-2.
- Roskill, Stephen (1954). The War at Sea 1939–1945. Vol. I.
- van der Vat, Dan (2000). Standard of Power. ISBN 0-09-180121-4.
- Whinney, Bob (2000). The U-boat Peril: A Fight for Survival. Cassell. ISBN 0-304-35132-6.
- Whitley, M. J. (1988). Destroyers of World War 2. Annapolis, Maryland: Naval Institute Press. ISBN 0-87021-326-1.
- Winser, John de D (1999). B.E.F. Ships Before, At and After Dunkirk. Gravesend, Kent: World Ship Society. ISBN 0-905617-91-6.
