= HMS Iron Duke (F234) =

1993 Type 23 or Duke-class frigate of the Royal Navy

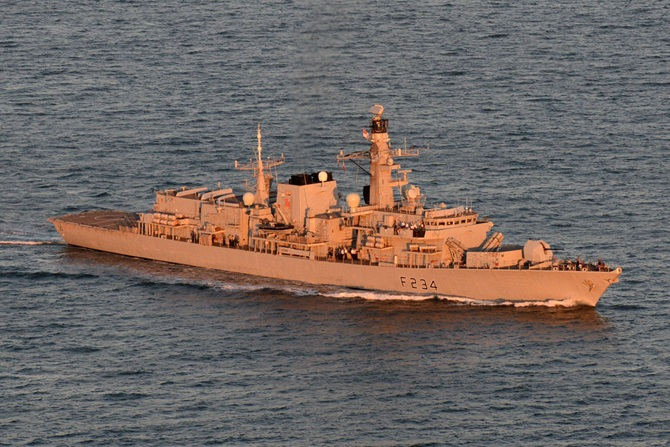
- HMS Iron Duke, 2013

History

United Kingdom
- Name: Iron Duke
- Operator: Royal Navy
- Ordered: July 1988
- Builder: Yarrow Shipbuilders
- Laid down: 12 December 1988
- Launched: 2 March 1991
- Commissioned: 20 May 1993
- Out of service: 2026
- Refit: Major 2012–2014, LIFEX 2019-2022
- Home port: HMNB Devonport
- Identification: IMO number: 8949628; MMSI number: 234604000; Pennant number: F234; International call sign: GCOB
- Motto: Virtutis Fortuna Comes; ("Fortune is the companion of valour")
- Status: Out of service
- Badge

General characteristics
- Class & type: Type 23 frigate
- Displacement: 4,900 t (4,800 long tons; 5,400 short tons)
- Length: 133 m (436 ft 4 in)
- Beam: 16.1 m (52 ft 10 in)
- Draught: 7.3 m (23 ft 11 in)
- Propulsion: CODLAG: Four 1510 kW (2,025 shp) Paxman Valenta 12CM diesel generators; Two GEC electric motors delivering 2980kW (4000 shp); Two Rolls-Royce Marine Spey SM1C gas turbines delivering 23,190 kW (31,100 shp)
- Speed: In excess of 28 kn (52 km/h; 32 mph)
- Range: 7,500 nautical miles (14,000 km) at 15 kn (28 km/h)
- Complement: 185 (accommodation for up to 205)
- Electronic warfare & decoys: UAF-1 ESM, or, UAT Mod 1; Seagnat; Type 182 towed torpedo decoy; Surface Ship Torpedo Defence
- Armament: Anti-air missiles: 1 × 32-cell GWS 35 Vertical Launching System (VLS) for: 32 × Sea Ceptor missiles (1–25+ km) (in refit as of 2021); Anti-ship missiles: 2 × quad Harpoon Block 1C (originally fit, retired 2023); may be fitted with Naval Strike Missile in due course; Anti-submarine torpedoes: 2 × twin 12.75 in (324 mm) Sting Ray torpedo tubes; Guns: 1 × BAE 4.5 inch Mk 8 naval gun; 2 × 30 mm DS30M Mk2 guns, or, 2 × 30 mm DS30B guns; 2 × Miniguns (originally fitted; replaced by Browning .50 caliber heavy machine guns as of 2023); 4 × General-purpose machine gun
- Aircraft carried: 1 × Wildcat HMA2, armed with: 4 × Sea Venom anti-ship missiles (initial operating capability from October 2025; full operating capability projected from 2026), or, 2 × Sting Ray anti-submarine torpedoes, or; 20 × Martlet multirole missiles (from 2021); Mk 11 depth charges; or; 1 × Westland Merlin HM2, armed with; 4 × anti submarine torpedoes
- Aviation facilities: Flight deck; Enclosed hangar

HMS Iron Duke was a Type 23 frigate of the Royal Navy, and the third ship to bear the name. She was withdrawn from service in 2026.

Over her career, Iron Duke intercepted several large consignments of illegal drugs being sent from the Caribbean to Europe.

In her only combat mission, she was in action off Libya in 2011, destroying a gun battery outside the besieged town of Misrata. She also fired star shells through the night to illuminate pro-Gaddafi positions for NATO aircraft to destroy rocket launchers, fuel dumps, ammo stores, artillery batteries and command and control centres, whilst also confirming that no civilians were in the area.

== Commissioning and construction ==
Iron Duke was launched on 2 March 1991 by Lady Jane King in the presence of the Duke and Duchess of Wellington. Her affiliated town is Kingston upon Hull, and she is named after Arthur Wellesley, the first Duke of Wellington (the "Iron Duke"). She was the fifth Duke-class Type 23 frigate to be launched for the Royal Navy, at a cost of £140 million.

The motto of Iron Duke is Virtutis Fortuna Comes (Latin: "Fortune is the companion of valour") – inherited from the 33rd (The Duke of Wellington's) Regiment of Foot.

Iron Duke carries a number of weapons and sensors which make her a multi-purpose combat vessel. Like all T23s, her original design role was anti-submarine warfare, but she can be employed in a variety of roles. She carries a Wildcat Helicopter which can be used in an anti-submarine and anti-surface role as well as for humanitarian and search and rescue purposes. The ship, like her sisters HMS Monmouth, HMS Montrose, HMS Lancaster and HMS Argyll, did not receive the new Sonar 2087 upgrade that other frigates of the class subsequently received. Therefore she has been regarded as a "general purpose" frigate without the more specialized anti-submarine capability of the other eight ships in the Type 23 fleet. However, on the retirement of HMS Westminster in 2024, it was reported that the S2087 towed array from that ship might now be fitted to Iron Duke instead, though it remained unconfirmed whether this would actually occur.

Iron Duke was the First of Class fit for the Royal Navy's new Type 997 Artisan 3D, successfully firing her missile system, using the new radar combined with the updated 'SWMLU' Seawolf missile targeting system, in the English Channel.

== Operational history ==
=== 1993–2000 ===
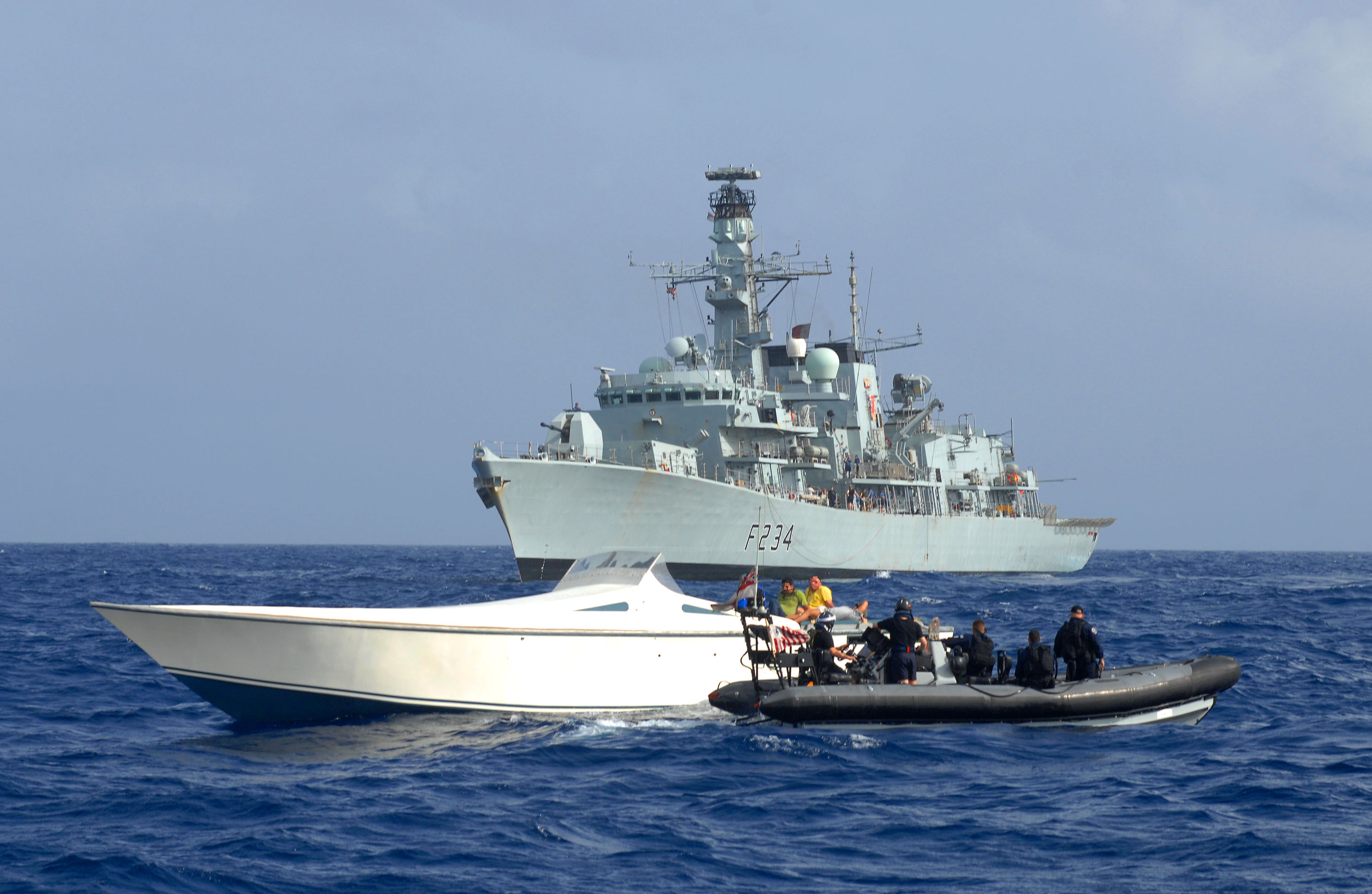
Iron Duke intercepting a suspected smuggling vessel in the Caribbean.

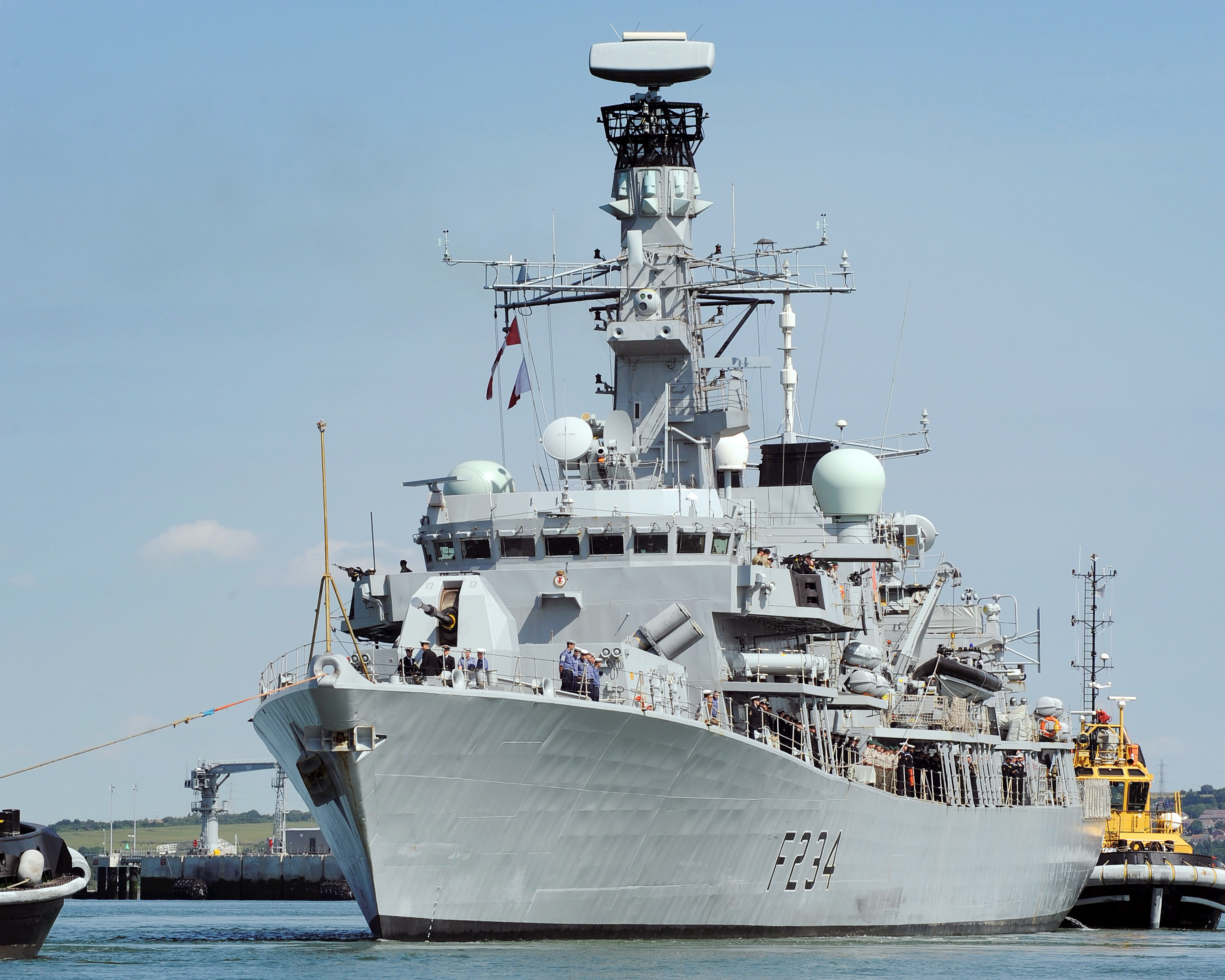
Leaving Portsmouth post refit, with new radar, July 2014.

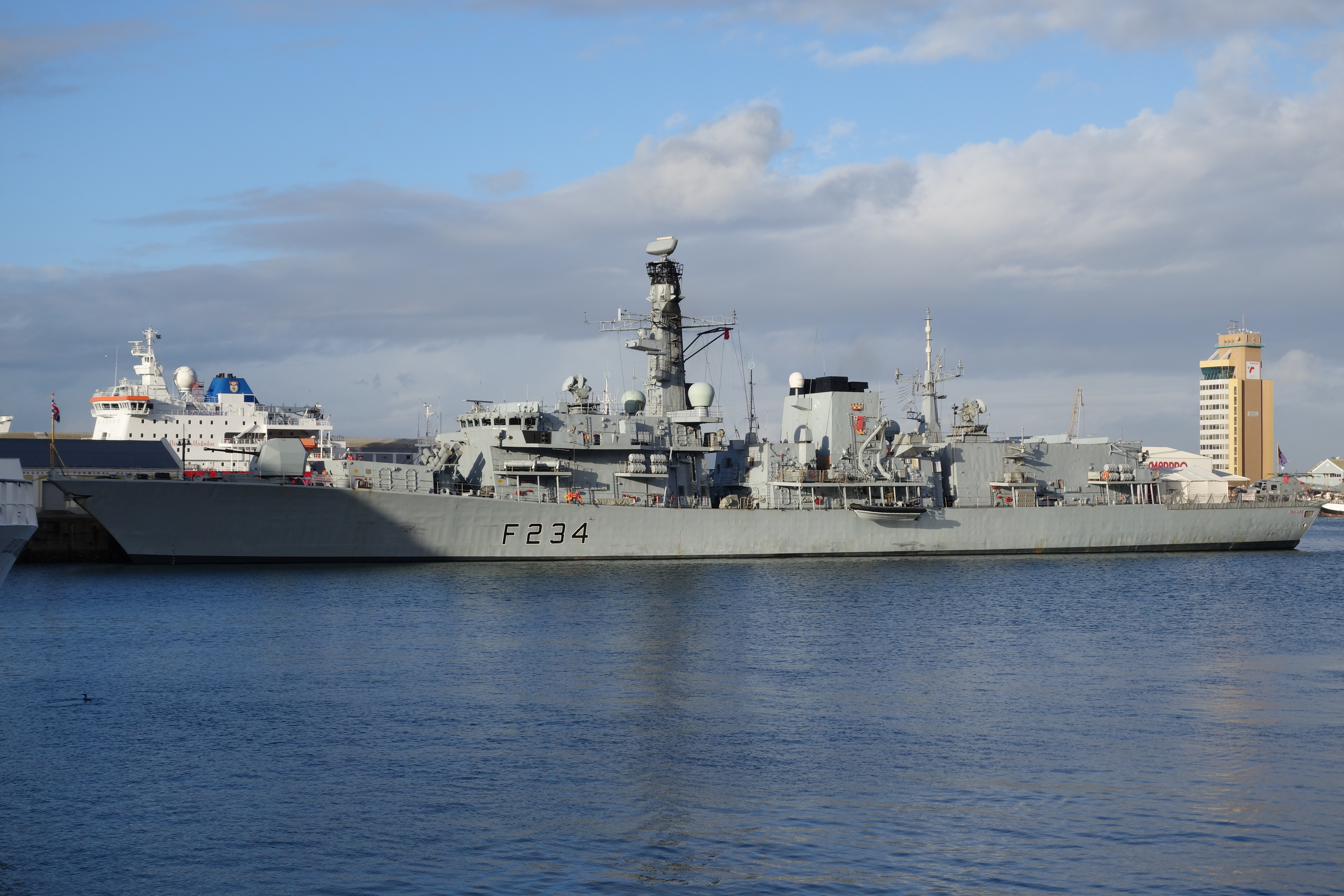
Iron Duke in Cape Town, August 2014.

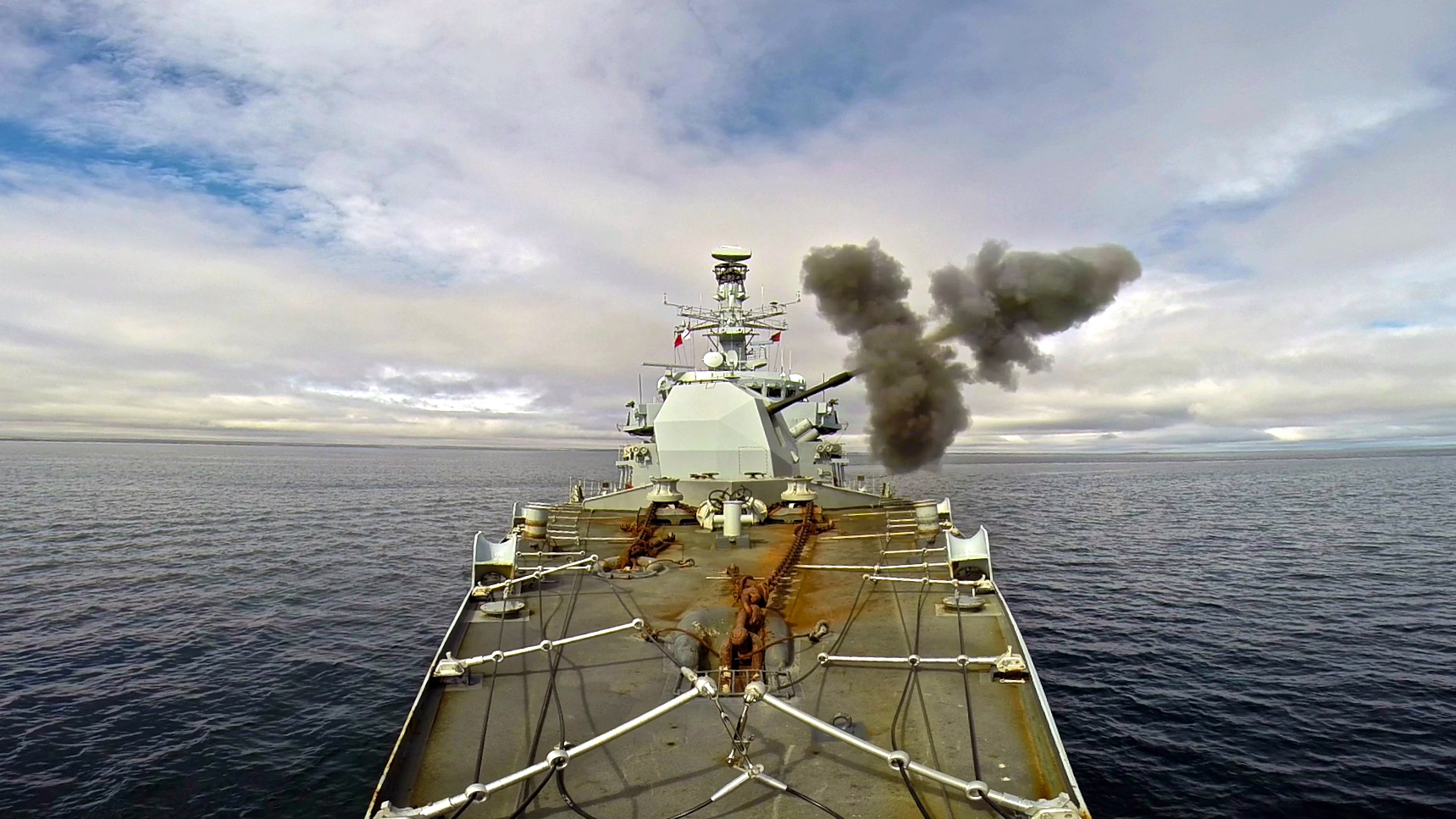
Iron Duke fires her naval gun in the South Atlantic Ocean in 2014.

In 2000, under the command of Commander Ben Key for Atlantic Patrol Tasking (South), Iron Duke was part of Task Group 342.1 that deployed to Sierra Leone. The Task Group was led by HMS Illustrious (R06) and was made up of Ocean, Argyll, Iron Duke, Chatham and four Royal Fleet Auxiliary ships. Operation Palliser aimed at restoring peace and stability to Sierra Leone. Commodore Niall Kilgour, Commander Amphibious Task Group, served as the seagoing commander for the operation.

Iron Duke relieved Argyll of her duties in September. During this incident Argyll, assisted by Ocean, laid the foundation for the Iron Duke Community School;a school for orphans in Freetown. President Ahmad Tejan Kabbah of Sierra Leone decreed the school be named after the Iron Duke in honour of their crew completing the construction of the six classrooms.

During this deployment Iron Duke also visited the Falkland Islands, Brazil, Ghana, Senegal and attended Exponaval 2000 when she made a good will visit to Valparaíso, Chile, to help improve relations with the UK's traditional ally. This was the RN's first visit since the UK arrest of General Pinochet.

=== 2001–2010 ===
In May 2002 Iron Duke re-entered service after a refit, armed with a new 4.5 inch Mod 1 gun. Under the command of Commander Phil Warwick, Iron Duke sailed into Portsmouth for her re-dedication. Amongst those in attendance were the present Duke of Wellington and Earl Jellicoe, both related to figures associated with the ship's name and career. The following January Iron Duke deployed to the Caribbean for counter-drugs operations, hurricane season disaster relief standby, and visiting UK Overseas Territories for diplomatic purposes. This was the frigate's first operation since completing her refit at the end of 2001 and comprehensive training including multi-national exercises off Scotland.

In February 2006 Iron Duke conducted trials in Loch Goil and Loch Fyne.

In September 2006 Iron Duke, under Commander Andy Jordan, was providing a presence for UK overseas territories in the Caribbean and providing the UK contribution to the war on drugs. She returned to the UK in December 2006. During her six-month deployment, Iron Duke steamed over 31,000 nautical miles (57,000 km), and made 22 port visits to 18 different locations.

In 2007 Iron Duke, now under the command of Commander Andy Gurr, was dry-docked for ten months at HMNB Portsmouth. Various systems were upgraded including the anti-submarine warfare equipment, and the ability to operate the Merlin helicopter was added. The first installation of a NATO Radial Chemical, Biological, Radioactive, Nuclear filter system was made; this filter was undergoing trials prior to installation across the fleet, if successful.

After 18 months of refit and upgrading, by March 2008 Iron Duke was halfway through her Operational Sea Training, in readiness for deployment to the North Atlantic at the end of May. All aspects of warfare were included in the training, including the infamous 'Thursday War' training exercise.

On 18 April 2008 Iron Duke deployed to Avonmouth to train in sea and harbour safety. Avon and Somerset Police assisted in training in the co-operation between the Royal Navy and uniformed police in the event of harbour security being breached. Civic dignitaries also viewed the ship. Later in April the Iron Duke's Operational Sea Training increased in difficulty with a simulation of tension between Brownian and Ginger forces with negotiations in neutral Freeport (Devonport) and a high risk of terrorist attacks. This exercise tested the defensive capabilities of the ship and the flexibility of proportional response to threats. Later in the series of exercises a hurricane hit the simulated island of Bullpoint, allowing Iron Duke to test her disaster relief capabilities including first aid, providing food and shelter to the survivors and helping to rebuild basic amenities.

Iron Duke visited her home town, Kingston upon Hull, over the weekend of 26 to 29 April 2008 and was open to the public for six hours.

By Friday 13 June Iron Duke arrived in Lisbon, Portugal after two operational stand-offs to determine that she was ready to deploy operationally. Iron Duke was briefed by the Maritime Analysis and Operations Centre-Narcotics, a pan-European counter-narcotics agency, about intelligence on criminal matters such as cannabis and cocaine smuggling on the high seas. She then moved to Gibraltar for re-supply and the infamous Rock Run. Iron Duke was now on Maritime Security Patrol in the North Atlantic.

As of 31 August 2008 Iron Duke was dispatched to assist relief efforts for the Atlantic Hurricane Gustav.

Iron Duke has intercepted illegal drugs being shipped from the Caribbean to Europe on several occasions, sometimes aided by embarked United States Coast Guard personnel. Large shipments were intercepted on 25 June 2003 (3.7 tonnes of cocaine on MV Yalta), 2 June 2008 (900 kilograms of cocaine in a speedboat which later sank), late July 2009 (drugs with a street value of £33 million on a speedboat later sunk by gunfire). and September 2009 (5.5 tonnes of cocaine).

=== Since 2011 ===
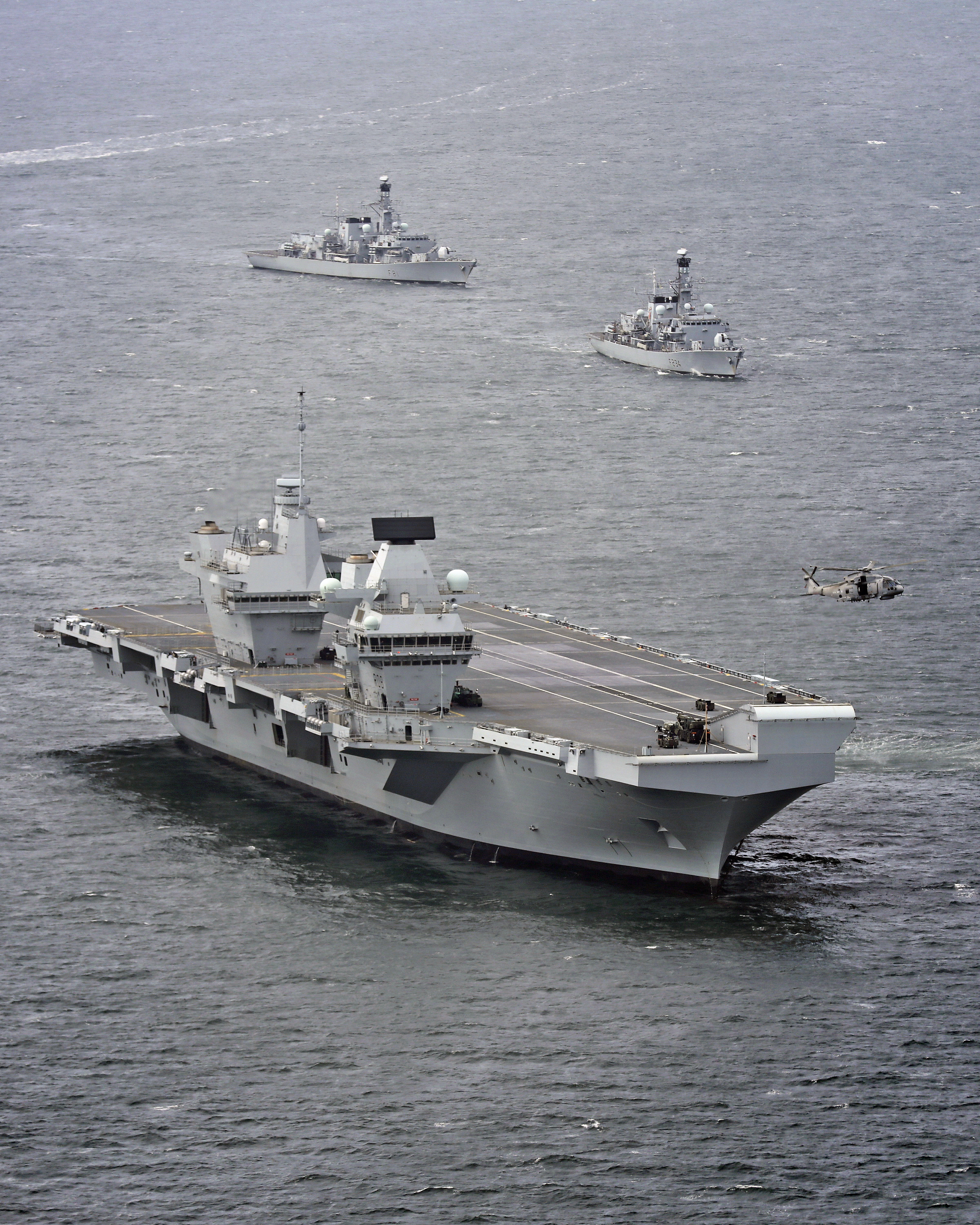
Iron Duke (upper right) in front of Sutherland and behind Queen Elizabeth during the latter's first sea trials

Iron Duke spent the first half of 2011 in the Persian Gulf before relieving HMS Liverpool off the coast of Libya, where she took part in combat operations for the first time in her 20-year history. She entered the Joint Operating Area on 16 July 2011 and over the course of the next five days, she went to Action Stations several times to support operations ashore. She was responsible for the destruction of a gun battery outside the besieged town of Misrata, while the frigate’s 4.5-inch gun fired many illuminating starshells to light up targets for NATO planes. She returned to Portsmouth in late July, in a joint homecoming with her sister ship Richmond

The Royal Navy's next generation helicopter, Wildcat, completed 20 days of demanding trials aboard Iron Duke, her first frigate, in January 2012.

In March 2012 Iron Duke began a major refit in HM Naval Base, Portsmouth. Some major parts of the refit took place for the first time on a Type 23 class of ship. The MOD was extending the life of the Type 23 frigates beyond the original time frame to coincide with the introduction of the Type 26 frigate class, expected at the time to enter service as soon as possible after 2020. Also included in the refit was the installation of BAE Systems Artisan medium-range 3D surveillance radar. In June 2013 she went back to sea. She test-fired her 7.62mm General Purpose Machine Guns and Mini-Guns, 3lb ceremonial guns and the torpedo system. In early 2014, she successfully fired her new 'SWMLU' Seawolf missile system against towed targets, destroying two simulated hostile aircraft skimming the surface of the sea, targeting from the brand new 3D radar system.

On 20 June 2014, Iron Duke deployed on routine Atlantic Patrol Tasking (South) operations for the first time since her refit, to sail down the Atlantic, gradually working her way south via the west coast of Africa to the British Overseas Territories in the region. On 20 August 2014, Iron Duke received a 21 gun salute as she approached Robben Island to dock at the V&A Waterfront in Cape Town, South Africa.

In January 2016, Iron Duke sailed on a six-month deployment including being tasked to Standing NATO Maritime Group 1. She took part in Exercise Dynamic Guard, and Exercise BALTOPS 16.

In June 2017, Iron Duke was assigned to maritime security operations and training around the United Kingdom but deployed at short notice to represent the Royal Navy in the BALTOPS exercise in the Baltic. Upon completion of the exercise she took part in Kiel Week 2017.

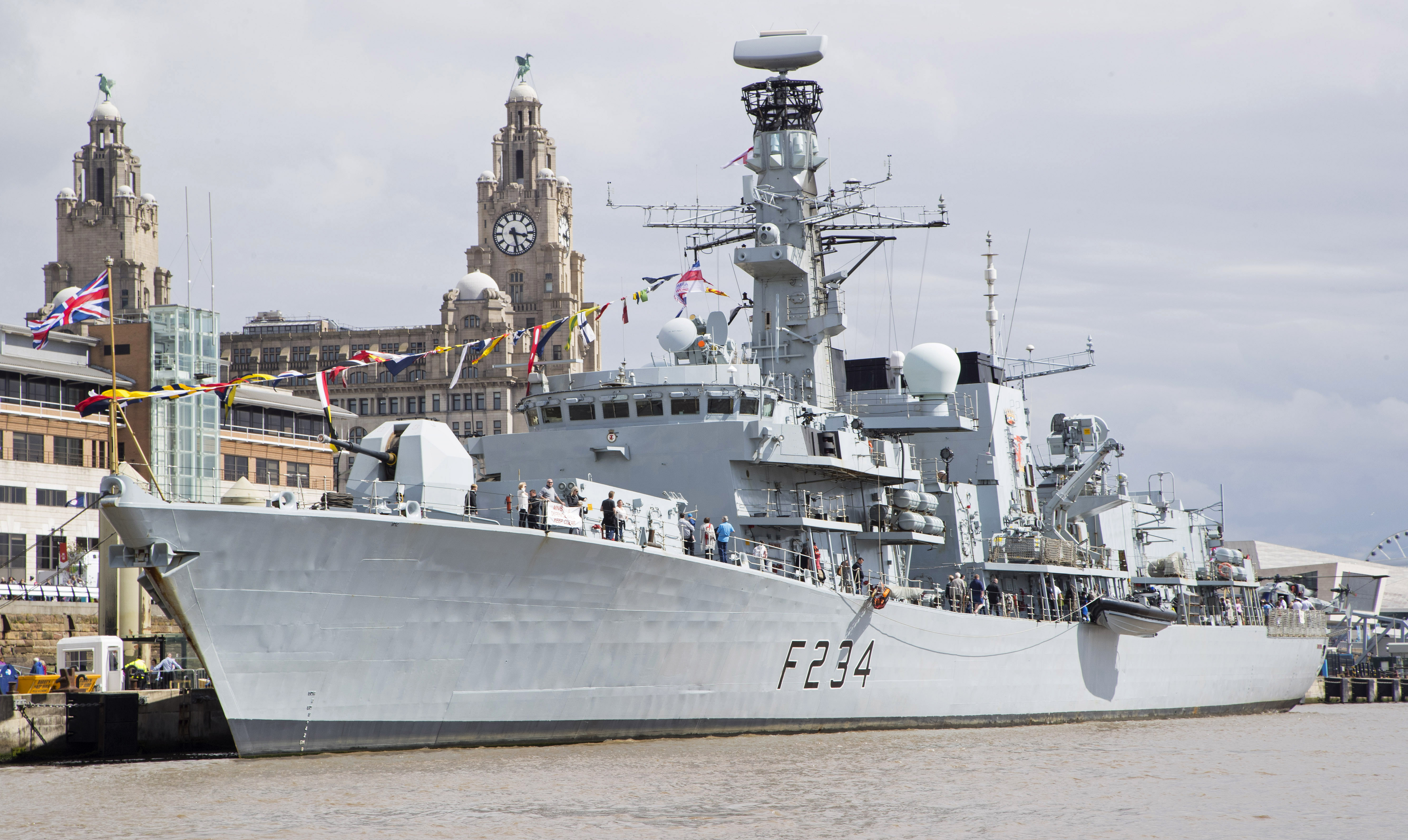
HMS Iron Duke, Liverpool, 2017

Iron Duke was exhibited at the National Armed Forces day in Liverpool which ran from 24–25 June 2017 where the prime minister Theresa May visited the ship. Iron Duke was also open to the public. On 28 June, in company with HMS Sutherland, Iron Duke provided escort for the aircraft carrier HMS Queen Elizabeth during her first days of sea trials. It was reported in 2018 that Iron Duke was laid up alongside in Portsmouth as a training ship since mid-2017, owing to a lack of manpower to fully crew the ship. In January 2019, the ship was towed out of Portsmouth for a major refit at Devonport, Plymouth. This 'LIFEX' refit would add Sea Ceptor, Artisan radar and new diesel generator sets. The ship's nearly five-year refit involved nearly 1.7 million hours of labour and was completed in 2023. She returned to sea for post-refit sea trials in May 2023.

In November 2024, HMS Iron Duke, along with tanker RFA Tideforce, monitored a trio of Russian vessels: the Admiral Gorshkov-class frigate Admiral Golovko, oceanographic research vessel Yantar and Kaliningradneft-class tanker Vyazma as they passed through the North Sea and English Channel en route to the Atlantic. All three had been tracked by the Royal Norwegian Navy before the Royal Navy took over. HMS Iron Duke and RFA Tideforce both followed the trio through the Dover Strait and Channel before handing over monitoring duties to the French Navy. The Yantar, however, continued to remain in the UK’s area of interest, heading north into the Irish Sea, with minehunter HMS Cattistock monitoring the survey vessel. As the Golovko and Vyazma continued their journey past France, Iron Duke took over shadowing duties of a second Russian group: frigate Neustrashimy and the replenishment oiler Akademik Pashin, which were making for their home port in the Baltic. The British ships remained in contact with the pair back through the Channel and into the North Sea before handing over to Dutch warship, HNLMS De Ruyter to finish escorting them back into the Baltic. Throughout the week-long operation, Iron Duke made use of both her own Wildcat helicopter from 815 Naval Air Squadron, plus a Merlin of 814 Naval Air Squadron based at Culdrose, an RAF P8 Poseidon maritime patrol aircraft and aerial assets of other allies to ensure the Russian vessels were closely monitored throughout.

HMS Iron Duke conducted a similar operation tracking Russian vessels in the Channel in February 2025.

Due to serious personnel shortages, in early May 2026 the ship was reported to have been stripped of its weapons and sensors and effectively laid up out of service, leaving the Royal Navy with five active frigates. In July 2026, the Royal Navy confirmed that the ship had effectively been withdrawn from service.

== Notable billeting ==
Prince William served on Iron Duke in the Caribbean for 5 weeks from late June 2008 with the rank of sub-lieutenant.

== Affiliations ==
- His Grace, The Duke of Wellington
- The Yorkshire Regiment (14th/15th, 19th and 33rd/76th Foot)
- No. 31 Squadron RAF
- Yorkshire Universities Royal Naval Unit (YURNU) serving the universities of Hull, Leeds and Sheffield.
- Jersey
- City of Kingston upon Hull
- Worshipful Company of Founders
- The Training ship Iron Duke
- Wellington College
- Victoria College CCF, Jersey
