= Thursday War =

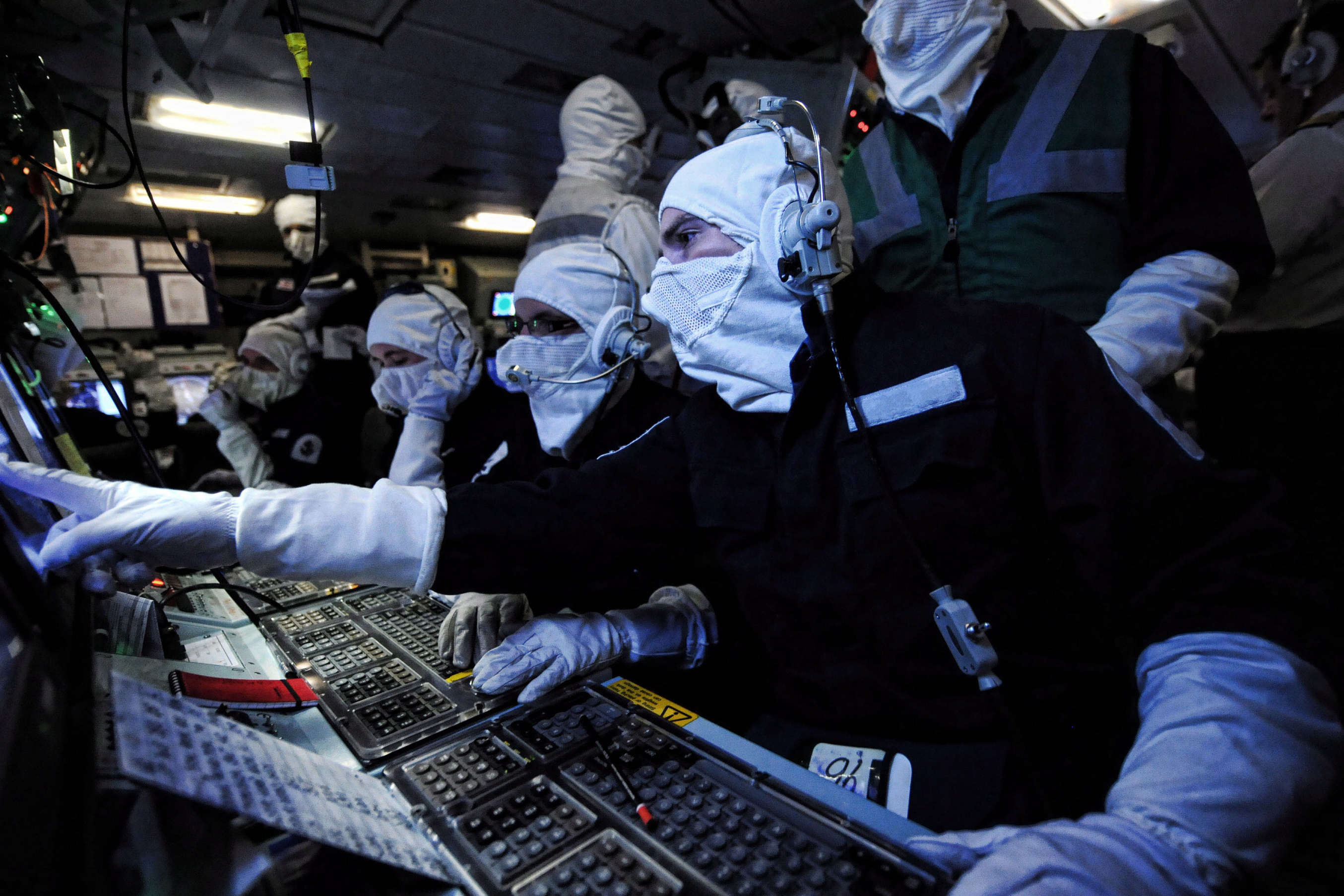
Operations room staff on board HMS Illustrious during a Thursday War. The operations room on board the ship is the hub of the vessel's sensors, and it is from here that her weapons systems are directed.

A Thursday War is the colloquial name given in the Royal Navy for the weekly war-fighting and damage control exercises that are held during Fleet Operational Sea Training (FOST), so named because they are usually held on a Thursday. FOST is responsible for ensuring that Royal Navy and Royal Fleet Auxiliary vessels are fit to join the operational fleet by testing vessels' readiness through a series of drills and exercises. These culminate in the so-called 'Thursday War', war-fighting scenarios designed to test a ship's company's reaction to various situations and emergencies.

Typically a 'Thursday War' involves a range of scenarios which include the vessel undergoing simulated attacks by aircraft, missiles and submarines; sustaining damage and casualties, and testing the crew's ability to fight fire, floods and deal with personnel injuries while underway. The exercise is designed to test the ship's operational readiness to fight in a real war situation and is the culmination of the FOST training period.

== See also ==
- Composite Training Unit Exercise (COMPTUEX) - US Navy predeployment exercise
