= List of Royal Navy vice admirals =

Vice admiral is a flag officer rank of the British Royal Navy and equates to the NATO rank code OF-8. It is immediately superior to the rear admiral rank and is subordinate to the full admiral rank. Naval personnel could be advanced to the rank of vice-admiral, normally from rear-admiral, whilst on active service, on the Reserved List (liable to be recalled to duty at short notice) or on the Retired List.

The Royal Navy has had vice admirals since at least the 16th century. When the fleet was deployed, the vice admiral would be in the leading portion or van, acting as the deputy to the admiral.

== Serving Vice Admirals ==
- Christopher Gardner (promoted 2019)
- Paul Marshall (promoted 2023)
- Andrew Kyte (promoted 2023)
- Edward Ahlgren (promoted 2024)
- Simon Asquith (promoted 2024)
- James David Morley (promoted 2024)
- Stephen Moorhouse (promoted 2025)
- Paul Beattie (promoted 2025)
- Robert Pedre (promoted 2026)

See also List of serving senior officers of the Royal Navy.

== List of vice admirals ==
Promoted	Name	Born	Died	Notes
November 1661	John Mennes	1599	1671	Comptroller of the Navy, 1661–71.
1682	Sir Thomas Allin, 1st Baronet	1612	1685	Comptroller of the Navy, 1671–80.
June 1693	Matthew Aylmer, 1st Baron Aylmer	1650?	1720	Admiral of the Fleet, 1708; MP for Dover.
1708	Sir John Jennings	1664	1743	Promoted Admiral, December 1708; MP for Queenborough.
12 November 1709	John Baker	1660	1716	MP for Weymouth.
1743	Nicholas Haddock	1686	1746	C-in-C Mediterranean; MP for Rochester; promoted Admiral, June 1744.
1743	Chaloner Ogle	1681	1750	C-in-C West Indies; promoted Admiral, June 1744.
1744	William Rowley	1690?	1768	Promoted Admiral, 1747.
23 June 1745	Isaac Townsend	1685?	1765	Promoted Admiral, July 1747.
1745	Henry Medley	1687	1747	Died in August within weeks of promotion to Vice Admiral of the Red (announced in the same Gazette which announced that Townsend, his immediate senior on the Navy List, became Admiral).
1748	Edward Hawke, 1st Baron Hawke	1705	1781	Promoted Admiral, February 1757; MP for Portsmouth.
1747	John Byng	1704	1757	Promoted Admiral, June 1756. Executed by firing squad, 1757.
1755	Sir Charles Knowles, 1st Baronet	1704	1777	Promoted Admiral, December 1760.
February 1758	Thomas Cotes	1712	1767	MP for Great Bedwyn.
1759	Harry Powlett, 6th Duke of Bolton	1720	1794	MP for Christchurch; promoted Admiral, October 1770.
1779	George Darby	1720?	1790	MP for Plymouth.
1790	Thomas Fitzherbert	1747	1794	MP for Arundel; C-in-C Jamaica; Captured American privateer ships. Promoted Admiral, 1790.
1793	Sir Richard King, 1st Baronet	1730	1806	Promoted Admiral, June 1795.
1 June 1795	Sir Thomas Rich, 5th Baronet	c.1733	1803	
1801	Sylverius Moriarty	1735	1809	Latterly the regulating captain at Cork.
23 April 1804	Horatio Nelson, 1st Viscount Nelson	1758	1805	Killed in action, Battle of Trafalgar.
4 June 1814	Sir William Hargood, GCH KCB	1762	1839	
12 August 1819	Robert Riddell-Carre, CB	1782	1860	Of Cavers-Carre.
19 July 1821	Sir Richard King, 2nd Baronet, KCB	1774	1834	C-in-C East Indies Station, 1816.
19 July 1821	Sir George Parker, KCB	1767	1847	Promoted Admiral, January 1837.
1841	George McKinley	1766	1852	Promoted Admiral, June 1851.
28 April 1847	Charles Malcolm	1782	1851	
8 January 1848	Richard Darton Thomas	1777	1857	Promoted Admiral, September 1854.
12 November 1849	Sir Josiah Coghill Coghill, 3rd Baronet	1773	1850	
11 June 1851	Sir Anthony Maitland, 10th Earl of Lauderdale KCB KCMG	1785	1863	Promoted Admiral, June 1857.
16 June 1851	Hon. Granville Leveson Proby	1782	1868	Promoted Admiral, July 1857.
27 October 1854	Robert Merrick Fowler	1778	1860	On Retired List.
2 July 1855	Hon. Alexander Montgomery Jones	1778	1862	On Reserved List.
28 December 1855	Joseph Needham Tayler	1783	1864	On Retired List.
9 July 1857	Henry Lorraine Baker, Bt, CB	1787	1859	On Retired List.
9 July 1857	John Sheridan	c.1778	1862	On Retired List.
30 July 1857	Houston Stewart KCB	1791	1875	Promoted Admiral, November 1862; Admiral of the Fleet, 1872.
10 September 1857	Provo Wallis GCB	1791	1892	Promoted Admiral, March 1863; Admiral of the Fleet, December 1875.
10 September 1857	Charles Orlando Bridgeman	1791	1860	On Retired List.
27 September 1857	David Leslie-Melville, 8th Earl of Leven	1785	1860	On Retired List.
2 October 1857	Benedictus Marwood Kelly	1785	1867	Promoted Admiral on Reserved List, 1863.
5 January 1858	Sir George Richard Brooke-Pechell, Bt	1789	1860	On Reserved List.
5 January 1858	Hon. Henry John Rous	1795	1877	Promoted Admiral, June 1863.
6 March 1858	Alexander Dundas Young Arbuthnott	1789	1871	On Retired List. Promoted Admiral on Retired List in November 1863.
7 May 1858	William Waldegrave CB	1788	1859	On Retired List.
25 June 1858	Sir Montagu Stopford, KCB	1798	1864	Promoted Admiral, November 1863.
18 December 1858	George Robert Lambert, GCB	1796	1869	
4 June 1861	James Scott	1790	1872	Promoted Admiral, 1865.
29 July 1861	George William Conway Courtenay	1795	1863	Retired 1831.
29 July 1861	John Fitzgerald Studdert	1788	1867	On Retired List.
5 August 1861	Sir Robert Lambert Baynes KCB	1796	1869	Promoted Admiral, 1865.
5 August 1861	Sir John Burnet Dundas, Bt	1794	1868	On Reserved List.
5 August 1861	Sir Frederick William Grey, GCB	1805	1878	First Naval Lord, June 1861. Promoted Admiral, April 1865.
5 August 1861	Charles Gordon			On Retired List.
7 May 1862	Abraham Crawford	1788	1869	On Retired List.
7 May 1862	Russell Henry Manners	1800	1870	On Retired List; promoted Admiral in September 1865; President of Royal Astronomical Society 1868–70.
7 May 1862	James Thorne	1794	1870	On Retired List; promoted Admiral in September 1865.
7 May 1862	John Alexander Duntze	1806	1882	Promoted Admiral, December 1865.
12 April 1862	John Furneaux	1793	1865	On Reserved List.
12 April 1862	Henry Gosset	1796	1877	On Reserved List; promoted Admiral in September 1865.
12 April 1862	Jodrell Leigh KH	1790	1863	On Reserve List.
12 April 1862	Sir Peter Richards, KCB	1798	1869	On Reserved List; promoted Admiral in September 1865.
12 April 1862	Joseph O'Brien	1796	1865	On Reserved List; promoted Admiral in September 1865.
12 April 1862	Henry Smith, KCB	1803	1887	Promoted Admiral in September 1865.
4 October 1862	Sir Thomas Hastings, KCB	1790	1870	Promoted Admiral, April 1866.
4 October 1862	James Wigston	1792	1881	On Reserve list. Promoted Admiral, April 1866.
10 November 1862	Charles Ramsay Drinkwater Bethune CB	1802	1884	Promoted Admiral, April 1866.
11 December 1862	Sir Francis William Austen, GCB	1774	1865	Promoted to Admiral, 1848.
27 April 1863	Henry Wolsey Bayfield	1795	1855	Promoted Admiral, 25 October 1867.
24 September 1863	Henry John Codrington, KCB	1808	1877	Promoted Admiral, October 1867.
24 September 1863	James Burney	1794	1884	On Retired List; promoted Admiral, October 1867.
14 November 1863	James Brasier	1784	1864	On Reserved List.
14 November 1863	Robert Contart McCrea	1793	1875	On Reserved List.
14 November 1863	Michael Quin			
14 November 1863	William Slaughter, KH			On Retired List.
14 November 1863	Thomas Gill			On Retired List.
14 November 1863	William Allan Herringham	1790	1865	On Retired List.
14 November 1863	Robert Gordon			On Retired List.
30 November 1863	John Balfour Maxwell	1799	1874	Promoted on Reserved List.
30 November 1863	John Rivett-Carnac	1796	1869	Promoted on Reserved List. Promoted Admiral, April 1868.
30 November 1863	Thomas Maitland, 11th Earl of Lauderdale, GCB	1803	1878	Promoted Admiral, April 1868.
3 December 1863	William Hargood	1801	1888	On Reserved List.
3 December 1863	Robert Smart, KCB KH	1796	1874	Promoted Admiral, January 1869.
3 December 1863	Sir Thomas Raikes Trigge Thompson	1804	1865	On Reserved List.
15 December 1863	Sir Rodney Mundy GCB	1805	1884	Promoted Admiral, May 1869; Admiral of the Fleet, December 1877.
11 January 1864	Henry Keppel, KCB OM	1809	1904	Promoted Admiral, June 1869.
11 January 1864	Sir William Dickson, 3rd Baronet	1798	1868	On Reserved List.
11 January 1864	William Sydney Smith	1799	1892	On Reserved List; promoted Admiral, July 1869.
11 January 1864	Henry Ommanney Love	1793	1872	On Retired List.
15 June 1864	Russell Eliott	1802	1881	On Reserved List.
15 June 1864	John Elphinstone Erskine	1806	1887	MP for Stirlingshire, 1865–74; promoted Admiral, September 1869.
15 June 1864	Alfred Luckraft	1790	1871	On Retired List; promoted retired Admiral in September 1869.
1865	Henry Chetwynd-Talbot, 18th Earl of Shrewsbury	1803	1868	MP for Hertford and Staffordshire South.
12 September 1865	George Augustus Elliot	1813	1901	Promoted Admiral, September 1869.
2 April 1866	Sir Edward Belcher CB	1799	1877	Put on Retired List, 2 April 1866. Made Admiral, 20 October 1872.
2 April 1866	Patrick John Blake	1798	1884	Made Vice-Admiral on Reserved List.
2 April 1866	James John Stopford	1817	1868	Brother of Robert Fanshawe Stopford.
2 April 1866	Robert Fanshawe Stopford	1811	1891	Promoted Admiral.
2 April 1866	Sackett Hope	1801	1868	Made Vice-Admiral on Reserved List.
2 April 1866	Thomas Leeke Massie	1802	1898	Put on Retired List, 6 April 1866; promoted Admiral on 20 October 1872.
2 April 1866	Robert Spencer Robinson	1809	1889	Controller of the Navy 1861–1869; Third Naval Lord 1869–1871; promoted Admiral, July 1871.
2 April 1866	Thomas Matthew Charles Symonds GCB	1813	1894	Promoted Admiral, 14 July 1871.
2 April 1866	William Warren CB	1798	1871	Made Vice-Admiral on Reserved List.
2 April 1866	Woodford John Williams	1809	1892	On Retired List from April 1870.
6 April 1866	John Venour Fletcher	1801	1877	Promoted on Reserved List; promoted retired Admiral, October 1872.
6 April 1866	Talavera Vernon Anson	1809	1895	Promoted on Reserved List; promoted Admiral, October 1872.
6 April 1866	Charles Eden	1808	1878	
6 April 1866	Charles Gilbert John Brydone Elliot, KCB	1818	1895	Promoted Admiral, February 1873.
6 April 1866	Augustus Leopold Cooper, KCB	1809	1885	Promoted to Admiral, October 1872.
6 April 1866	Samuel Perkins Pritchard	1787	1868	On Retired List.
20 March 1867	George St Vincent King, KCB	1809	1891	C-in-C East Indies Station, 1865.
18 October 1867	Charles Frederick	1797	1875	Third Naval Lord, 1861–65; promoted Admiral, July 1875.
18 October 1867	Hon. Keith Stewart, CB	1814	1879	On Reserved List.
18 October 1867	George Goldsmith, CB			On Retired List.
18 October 1867	William Griffin			On Reserved List.
18 October 1867	John Hallowes			On Reserved List.
10 September 1869	Honourable George Fowler Hastings CB	1814	1876	
1 April 1870	Sir Edward Gennys Fanshawe GCB	1814	1906	Promoted Admiral, June 1876.
1 April 1870	Claude Henry Mason Buckle, CB	1804	1894	Retired.
1 April 1870	Thomas Baillie			Retired 1873.
1 April 1870	George Giffard KCB	1815	1895	Retired List, April 1870. Made Admiral, January 1877.
1 April 1870	Sir Frederick William Erskine Nicolson, Bt., CB	1815	1899	Promoted Admiral, January 1877.
1 April 1870	Henry Bagot	1810	1877	On Reserved List.
1 April 1870	Sir George Nathaniel Broke-Middleton, Bt, CB	1812	1887	On Reserved List.
1 April 1870	Sir Bartholomew James Sulivan KCB	1810	1890	On Reserved List. Promoted to Admiral, 1877.
1 April 1870	William Nevill			On Retired List.
1 April 1870	Joseph Pearse	1794	>1870	On Retired List.
7 May 1872	John Fulford	1809	1888	on the Retired list since 1870; promoted Admiral on the Retired list in 1877
7 May 1872	Sir Alfred Phillipps Ryder, KCB	1820	1888	Promoted Admiral in 1877
29 May 1873	Charles Farrel Hillyar	1817	1888	Promoted Admiral in September 1878.
29 May 1873	Frederick Byng Montresor	1811	!887	On Retired List since April 1870.
29 May 1873	Archibald McMurdo	1812	1875	On Retired List.
29 May 1873	Charles Frederick Schomberg	1815	1874	On Retired List.
1870s	Edwin Clayton Tennyson-d'Eyncourt	1813	1903	on retired list since 1870
December 1880	Charles Fellowes, CB	1823	1886	Died on active duty aboard HMS Minotaur.
July 1884	Sir William Nathan Wrighte Hewett, VC, KCB	1834	1888	
November 1885	Edward Henry Howard	1832	1890	On Retired List from November 1889.
March 1886	Charles Thomas Curme	1827	1892	Died at his official residence serving as Commander-in-Chief the Nore.
April 1886	George Willes Watson	1827	1897	On Retired List from April 1892.
15 July 1887	Henry Rushworth Wratislaw CB	1832	1913	Retired List on 29 January 1891; promoted Admiral on the retired list in 1892.
1888	George Henry Parkin		1902	On the Retired List since 1883.
29 January 1891	Sir St. George Caulfield d′Arcy-Irvine, KCB	1833	1916	Promoted to Admiral in 1897.
14 February 1892	Sir James Elphinstone Erskine, KCB	1838	1911	Promoted Admiral in 1897.
20 February 1892	George Lydiard Sulivan	1832	1904	Retired List on 26 March 1892; promoted Admiral on Retired List in 1897.
20 February 1892	Edward Field, CB	1828	1912	On the Retired List before promotion; promoted Admiral on the Retired List in 1897.
25 February 1892	Sir Henry Frederick Nicholson, KCB	1835	1914	Promoted Admiral in 1897.
25 February 1892	Morgan Singer	1831		On the Retired List since before promotion.
26 March 1892	Sir Alexander Buller, GCB	1834	1903	Promoted Admiral in 1897.
26 March 1892	Sir George Strong Nares, KCB	1831	1915	On the Retired List since 1886.
5 April 1892	Loftus Francis Jones	1836	1912	Promoted Admiral in 1897.
25 July 1892	George Stanley Bosanquet	1835	1914	Retired List in 1894.
13 May 1893	Edward Stanley Adeane, CMG	1836	1902	Promoted Admiral in 1898.
13 May 1893	James Augustus Poland	1832	1918	On the Retired List since 1886.
1 September 1893	Sir Charles Frederick Hotham, GCB, GCVO	1843	1925	Promoted Admiral in 1899.
20 February 1895	Lord Walter Talbot Kerr, GCB	1839	1927	Promoted Admiral in 1900.
22 June 1895	Sir George Digby Morant, KCB	1837	1921	Promoted Admiral in 1901.
9 November 1895	Sir Edward Hobart Seymour, GCB, OM, GCVO	1840	1929	Promoted Admiral in 1901.
19 January 1896	Henry Craven St John	1837	1909	Promoted Admiral in 1901.
19 January 1896	Robert Peel Dennistoun	1837	1915	On the Retired List since before promotion.
11 March 1896	Sir William Robert Kennedy, GCB	1838	1916	Promoted Admiral in 1901.
8 May 1896	John Arbuthnot Fisher, 1st Baron Fisher, GCB, OM, GCVO	1841	1920	Promoted Admiral in 1901.
8 May 1896	George Parsons	1831	1907	On the Retired List since 1886.
10 October 1896	Sir Henry Frederick Stephenson, GCVO, KCB	1842	1919	Promoted Admiral in 1901.
9 November 1896	Sir Charles George Fane, KCB	1837	1909	Promoted Admiral in 1902.
9 November 1896	Harry Woodfall Brent	1834	1911	On the Retired List since 1889.
23 February 1897	Sir Compton Edward Domvile, GCB, GCVO	1842	1924	Promoted Admiral in 1902.
23 February 1897	John Frederick George Grant	1835	1916	On the Retired List since 1894; promoted Admiral on Retired List in 1902.
23 February 1897	Henry Forster Cleveland	1834	1924	On the Retired List since 1894; promoted Admiral on Retired List in 1902.
10 May 1897	Sir Frederick George Denham Bedford, GCB, GCVO	1838	1913	Promoted Admiral in 1902.
23 August 1897	Sir Albert Hastings Markham, KCB	1841	1918	Promoted Admiral in 1903.
23 August 1897	John Fiot Lee Pearse Maclear	1838	1907	On the Retired List since 1891; promoted Admiral on Retired List in 1903.
16 September 1897	Alfred Taylor Dale	1840	1925	Promoted Admiral in 1903.
16 September 1897	Guy Ouchterlony Twiss	1834	1918	On the Retired List since 1889.
16 September 1897	Thomas Harvey Royse	1835		On the Retired List since before promotion.
11 December 1897	Claude Edward Buckle	1839	1930	Promoted Admiral in 1903.
26 December 1897	Richard Duckworth-King	1840	1900	Retired List on 21 December 1898.
19 March 1898	Sir Harry Holdsworth Rawson, GCB, GCMG	1843	1910	Promoted Admiral in 1903.
29 November 1898	Sir Cyprian Arthur George Bridge, GCB	1839	1924	Promoted Admiral in 1903.
29 November 1898	Francis Richard Blackburne	1835	1902	On the Retired List since 1890.
29 November 1898	Richard George Kinahan	1837	19	On the Retired List since before promotion.
29 November 1898	Richard Henry Napier	1836	1903	On the Retired List since 1890.
21 December 1898	Edmund Charles Drummond	1841	1911	Promoted Admiral in 1903.
13 January 1899	Charles Searle Cardale	1841	1904	Retired List on 3 March 1900; promoted Admiral on Retired List in 1904.
30 June 1899	Edmund John Church	1842	1904	Retired List on 11 July 1899; promoted Admiral on Retired List in 1904.
11 July 1899	Sir John Reginald Thomas Fullerton, GCVO, CB	1840	1918	Retired List in ?; promoted Admiral on Retired List in 1904.
13 July 1899	Sir Ernest Rice, KCB	1840	1927	Promoted Admiral in 1904.
13 July 1899	Charles Barstow Theobald	1843	1905	On the Retired List since 1893; promoted Admiral on Retired List in 1904.
13 July 1899	Henry St. Leger Bury Palliser	1839	1907	On the Retired List since June 1899; promoted Admiral on Retired List in 1904.
26 October 1899	Frederick Samuel Vander-Maulen	1839	1913	Retired List on 20 November 1899; promoted Admiral on Retired List in 1904.
20 November 1899	Sir Hilary Gustavus Andoe, KCB	1841	1905	Retired List on 19 February 1901; promoted Admiral on Retired List in 1904.
3 March 1900	Armand Temple Powlett	1841	1925	Retired List on 17 March 1901; promoted Admiral on Retired List in 1904.
21 March 1900	Alexander Plantagenet Hastings, CB	1843	1928	Retired List on 28 March 1901; promoted Admiral on Retired List in 1904.
10 August 1900	Rodney Maclaine Lloyd, CB	1841	1911	Retired List on 1 September 1902; promoted Admiral on Retired List in 1904.
10 August 1900	Robert Woodward, CB	1838	1907	On the Retired List since 1893.
1 January 1901	Charles Lister Oxley	1841	1920	Promoted Admiral in 1904.
1 January 1901	Francis Starkie Clayton	1838	1913	On the Retired List since before promotion.
1 January 1901	Arthur Hildebrand Alington	1839	1925	On the Retired List since 1899.
1 January 1901	Henry John Carr	1839	1914	On the Retired List since 1899.
19 February 1901	Sir Robert Hastings Harris, KCB, KCMG	1843	1926	Promoted Admiral in 1904.
13 March 1901	Sir Hugo Lewis Pearson, KCB	1843	1912	Promoted Admiral in 1904.
17 March 1901	Sir John Fellowes, KCB	1843	1913	Promoted Admiral in 1904.
17 March 1901	Noel Stephen Fox Digby	1839	1920	On the Retired List since 1893.
17 March 1901	Henry Harvey Boys	1839	1914	On the Retired List since 1894.
28 March 1901	Charles Cooper Penrose-Fitzgerald	1841	1921	Promoted Admiral in 1905.
24 May 1901	Sir Arthur Knyvet Wilson, 3rd Baronet, VC, GCM, OM, GCVO	1842	1921	Promoted Admiral in 1905.
15 June 1901	Sir Archibald Lucius Douglas, GCB, GCVO	1842	1913	Promoted Admiral in 1905.
15 June 1901	Martin Julius Dunlop	1844?	1911	On the Retired List since 1894.
16 June 1901	William Home Chisholme St Clair	1841	1905	Retired List on 9 September 1901; promoted Admiral on the Retired List in 1905.
9 September 1901	Atwell Peregrine Macleod Lake	1842	1915	Retired List on 1 July 1902; promoted Admiral on the Retired List in 1905.
2 November 1901	Sir Gerard Henry Uctred Noel, GCB, KCMG	1845	1918	Promoted Admiral in 1905.
7 December 1901	John William Brackenbury, CB, CMG	1842	1918	Promoted Admiral in 1905.
7 December 1901	John Borlase Warren	1838	1919	On the Retired List since 1893.
24 January 1902	Sir Thomas Sturges Jackson, KCVO	1842	1934	Promoted Admiral in 1905.
24 January 1902	Arthur Cecil Henry Paget	1839	1924	On the Retired List since 1893.
25 January 1902	Sir Arthur Dalrymple Fanshawe, GCB, GCVO	1847	1936	Promoted Admiral in 1905.
25 January 1902	Richard Horace Hamond	1843	1906	On the Retired List since before promotion; promoted Admiral on the Retired List in 1905.
1 July 1902	Sir Day Hort Bosanquet, GCMG, GCVO, KCB	1843	1923	Promoted Admiral in 1905.
9 September 1902	Sir Lewis Anthony Beaumont, GCB, KCMG	1847	1922	Promoted Admiral in 1906.
3 October 1902	Charles William Beresford, 1st Baron Beresford GCB, GCVO	1846	1919	Promoted Admiral in 1905.
21 January 1903	Albert Baldwin Jenkings	1846	1942	Promoted Admiral in 1907.
30 May 1903	Sir James Andrew Thomas Bruce, KCMG	1846	1921	Promoted Admiral in 1907.
30 May 1903	Sir Henry Coey Kane, KCB	1843	1917	On the Retired List since 1899.
30 May 1903	Frederick Ross Boardman, CB	1843	1927	On the Retired List since 1899.
30 May 1903	Richard Evans	1861	1927	On the Retired List since 1894.
12 August 1903	Pelham Aldrich, CVO	1844	1930	Promoted Admiral in 1907
30 August 1903	Swinton Colthurst Holland	1844	1922	Promoted Admiral in 1907.
30 August 1903	Charles Johnstone	1843	1927	On the Retired list since before promotion.
30 August 1903	John Coke Burnell	1842	1928	On the Retired list since 1897.
15 March 1904	Sir William Alison Dyke Acland, 2nd Baronet, CVO	1847	1924	Promoted Admiral in 1908.
26 June 1905	John Harvey Rainier	1847	1915	Retired List on 1 August 1905; promoted Admiral on Retired List in 1908.
29 June 1905	Sir William Henry May, GCB, GCVO	1849	1930	Promoted Admiral in 1908.
5 July 1905	Alfred Arthur Chase Parr	1849	1914	Retired List on 8 March 1906; promoted Admiral on Retired List in 1908.
22 July 1905	Sir Reginald Friend Hannam Henderson, GCB	1846	1932	Promoted Admiral in 1908.
20 February 1906	Sir Edmund Samuel Poe, GCVO, KCB	1848	1921	Promoted Admiral in 1910.
8 March 1906	Arthur Charles Burgoyne Bromley	1847	1909	Retired List on.
17 October 1906	Sir Charles Campbell, KCMG, CB, DSO	1847	1911	Retired List on 18 October 1906; promoted Admiral on Retired List in 1910.
18 October 1906	Sir John Durnford, GCB, DSO	1849	1914	Promoted Admiral in 1910.
1 January 1907	Sir Hedworth Meux, GCB, KCVO	1856	1929	Promoted Vice Admiral in 1911.
8 February 1907	Sir Francis Powell, KCMG, CB	1849	1927	Retired List on 13 February 1907; promoted Admiral on Retired List in 1911.
13 February 1907	William Des Vœux Hamilton	1852	1907	
16 February 1907	Sir Francis Charles Bridgeman Bridgeman, GCB, GCVO	1848	1929	Promoted Admiral in 1911.
1 March 1907	Sir Richard Poore, 4th Baronet, KCB, CVO	1853	1930	Promoted Admiral in 1911.
1 June 1907	Robert Leonard Groome, CVO	1848	1917	Retired list on 1 September 1907; promoted Admiral on Retired List in 1911.
1 September 1907	George Augustus Giffard, CMG	1849	1925	Promoted Admiral in 1911.
1 September 1907	John Edric Blaxland	1847	1935	on the Retired list since 1902.
12 May 1908	Sir Archibald Berkeley Milne, 2nd Baronet, GCVO, KCB	1855	1938	Promoted Admiral in 1911.
18 May 1908	Sir George Fowler King-Hall, KCB, CVO	1850	1939	Promoted Admiral in 1912.
10 February 1911	Frederick Owen Pike, CMG, DSO	1851	1921	on the Retired list since 1906.
18 September 1911	Sir John Rushworth Jellicoe, KCB OM GCVO	1859	1935	Previously temporary Vice-Admiral; Second Sea Lord, 1912–14; promoted Admiral in 1914.
18 September 1911	Henry Peter Routh, MVO	1851	1944	On Retired List.
18 September 1911	Robert Stevenson Dalton Cumming, CBE	1852	1940	On Retired List.
18 September 1911	James Startin	1855	1948	
1 January 1919	Arthur Cavenagh Leveson, GCB	1868	1929	Previously acting Vice-Admiral; promoted Admiral in 1922.
1 January 1919	Sidney Robert Fremantle, CB MVO	1867	1958	Previously acting Vice-Admiral; promoted Admiral in 1922.
24 March 1920	Francis William Kennedy, CB	1862	1939	Retired list on the following day 25 March 1920; promoted Admiral on the Retired list in 1925.
25 March 1920	Sir Heathcoat Salisbury Grant, KCMG, CB	1864	1938	Retired list on the following day 26 March 1920; promoted Admiral on the Retired list in 1925.
25 March 1920	Rowland Nugent	1861	1948	on the Retired list since 1916; promoted Admiral on the Retired List in 1925.
25 March 1920	Hugh Thomas Hibbert, CBE, DSO	1863	1951	on the Retired list since 1916; promoted Admiral on the Retired List in 1925.
25 March 1920	Arthur Herbert Stevenson Fyler, CB, DSO	1864	1934	on the Retired list since 1916; promoted Admiral on the Retired List in 1925.
26 March 1920	Sir Thomas Jackson, KBE, CB, MVO	1868	1945	Retired list in 1923; promoted Admiral on the Retired list in 1925.
31 July 1920	Frank Edward Cavendish Ryan, CBE	1865	1945	on the Retired list since 1916; promoted Admiral on the Retired list in 1925.
31 July 1920	Philip Nelson-Ward, MVO	1866	1937	on the Retired list since 1916; promoted Admiral on the Retired list in 1925.
31 July 1920	Sir William Edmund Goodenough, GCB, MVO	1867	1945	Promoted Admiral in 1925.
7 October 1920	Sir Michael Culme-Seymour, 4th Baronet, KCB, MVO	1867	1925	
24 November 1920	Sir William Coldingham Masters Nicholson, KCB	1863	1932	Promoted Admiral in 1925.
1 November 1922	Sir John Frederick Ernest Green, KCMG, CB	1866	1948	Retired list on 1 January 1925; promoted Admiral on Retired list in 1927.
1 November 1923	Brian H F Barttelot KBE CB CVO	1867	1942	Retired List on 2 November 1923; promoted Admiral on Retired List in 1927.
2 November 1923	Sir Walter Henry Cowan Bt, KCB DSO MVO ADC	1871	1956	Promoted Admiral in 1927.
July 1924	Sir Guy Reginald Archer Gaunt, KCMG, CB	1869	1953	on the Retired list; promoted Admiral on the Retired List in 1928.
1 October 1924	Hubert George Brand, GCB KCMG KCVO	1870	1955	Promoted Admiral in 1928.
1 January 1925	Douglas Lionel Dent, CB, CMG	1869	1959	Retired List on 6 August 1926; promoted Admiral on Retired list in 1929.
1 January 1925	Henry Blackett, CBE	1867	1952	on the Retired list since 1919; promoted Admiral on Retired list in 1929.
1 January 1925	Henry William Grant, CB	1870	1949	on the Retired list since 1919; promoted Admiral on Retired list in 1929.
1 January 1925	Sir Charles Martin de Bartolomé, KCMG, CB	1871	1941	on the Retired list since 1919; promoted Admiral on Retired list in 1929.
1 January 1925	Sydney Stewart Hall, CB	1872	1955	on the Retired list since 1919; promoted Admiral on Retired list in 1929.
1 January 1925	John Edmund Drummond	1873	1926	on the Retired list since before promotion
1 January 1925	Henry Boyle Townshend Somerville, CMG	1863	1936	on the Retired list since 1919.
1 January 1925	James Charles Tancred	1864	1943	on the Retired list since 1919.
1 July 1925	Crawford Maclachlan, CB	1867	1952	On Retired List; promoted Admiral, April 1930.
12 August 1925	John Luce CB	1870	1932	Retired List; promoted Admiral on the Retired list in 1930.
12 August 1925	Alfred Charles Sykes, CMG	1868	1933	on the Retired list since 1920.
24 November 1925	Raymond Andrew Nugent, CMG	1870	1959	on the Retired list since 1920.
24 November 1925	Eustace la Trobe Leatham, CB	1870	1935	on the Retired list since 1921.
24 November 1925	Wilmot Stuart Nicholson, CB	1870	1932	On Retired List; promoted Admiral, April 1930.
1 March 1926	Alfred Ernle Montacute Chatfield GCB, OM, KCMG, CVO, PC, DL	1873	1967	Promoted Admiral, May 1930, First Sea Lord, 1933.
1 March 1926	Arthur Allan Morison Duff	1874	1952	
1 March 1926	Charles Duncan Johnson	1869	1930	On Retired List, 2 March 1926. Promoted Admiral, May 1930.
2 March 1926	Hugh Francis Paget Sinclair KCB	1873	1939	Director of British Naval Intelligence, 1919. On the Retired List from 1926.
6 August 1926	Sir Arthur Kipling Waistell, KCB	1873	1953	Promoted Admiral in 1930.
1 August 1927	Percy Molyneux Rawson Royds, CB CMG ADC	1874	1955	Retired 2 August 1927; promoted Admiral on Retired List, 1932.
2 August 1927	Louis Charles Stirling Woolcombe, CB MVO	1872	1951	Retired 3 August 1927.
2 August 1927	John William Leopold McClintock CB DSO	1874	1929	President of the Royal Naval College, Greenwich, 1929.
3 August 1927	Francis Clifton-Brown CB CMG	1874	1963	Promoted to the rank of Vice-Admiral (retired) on 3 August 1927.
21 January 1928	Bertram Sackville Thesiger KBE CB CMG	1875	1966	Promoted Admiral in 1932.
	Sir Francis Herbert Mitchell, CB, DSO	1876	1946	Promoted Admiral in 1933
23 May 1929	Cecil Dacre Staveley Raikes, CBE	1874	1947	On the Retired List.
23 May 1929	John Ewen Cameron, CB MVO	1874	1939	Retired List on 24 May 1929; promoted Admiral on the Retired list in 1933.
24 May 1929	Cyril Samuel Townsend, CB	1875	1949	Retired List on 25 May 1929; promoted Admiral on the Retired list in 1933.
25 May 1929	Cecil Minet Staveley, CB, CMG	1874	1934	Retired List on 26 May 1929; promoted Admiral on the Retired list in 1933.
26 May 1929	John Derwent Allen, CB	1875	1958	On the Retired List.
26 May 1929	Robert Gordon Douglas Dewar, CBE	1874	1948	On Retired List.
26 May 1929	Sir Frank Larken, KCB, CMG	1875	1953	Promoted Admiral in 1933
26 May 1929	John Ernest Troyte Harper, CB MVO	1874	1949	On Retired List.
31 July 1929	William Rawdon Napier, CB, CMG, DSO	1877	1951	Retired List on 1 August 1929; promoted Admiral on the Retired list in 1933.
1 August 1929	Humphrey Wykeham Bowring, CB DSO	1874	1952	Retired List on 2 August 1929; promoted Admiral on the Retired list in 1933.
2 August 1929	Rudolf Miles Burmester, KBE CB CMG	1875	1956	Promoted Admiral in 1933.
1 April 1930	Henry Edgar Grace, CB	1876	1937	Retired List on 2 April 1930.
2 April 1930	Lionel George Preston, KCB	1875	1971	
8 May 1930	Sir Herbert Meade-Fetherstonhaugh, GCVO CB DSo	1875	1964	Promoted to Admiral, July 1934.
12 October 1932	Sir Martin Eric Dunbar-Nasmith, VC KCB KCMG	1883	1965	Promoted Admiral, January 1936.
6 October 1931	Colin Kenneth Maclean CB CVO DSO	1876	1935	Retired February 1932.
13 October 1932	Matthew Robert Best, KCB DSO&Bar MVO	1878	1940	Promoted Admiral, June 1936.
November 1932	Sir Edward Evans, KCB DSO	1880	1957	Promoted Admiral, July 1936.
31 December 1932	Henry Karslake Kitson, KBE CB	1877	1952	Retired List on the following day, 1 January 1933.
31 December 1932	Gordon Campbell, VC DSO MP	1886	1953	On Retired List.
31 December 1932	Herbert Arthur Buchanan-Wollaston, CMG	1878	1975	On Retired List.
31 December 1932	Norton Allen Sulivan, CVO	1897	1964	On Retired List.
1 January 1933	Harold Owen Reinold, CB CVO	1877	1962	Retired List on the following day, 2 January 1933.
2 January 1933	George Ronald Beddard Blount, DSO	1877	1964	On Retired List.
2 January 1933	Cecil Horace Pilcher, DSO	1887	1953	On Retired List.
2 January 1933	Theodore John Hallett, CB CBE	1878	1957	Retired List on the following day, 3 January 1933.
3 January 1933	Cecil Vivian Usborne, CB CMG	1880	1951	Retired List on the following day, 4 January 1933.
4 January 1933	George Knightley Chetwode, CB, CBE	1877	1957	Promoted Admiral in 1936.
4 January 1933	Wion de Malpas Egerton, DSO	1879	1943	On Retired List.
4 January 1933	Frederick Charles Fisher	1877	1958	On Retired List.
1 September 1933	Sir Charles James Colebrooke Little, GCB, GBE	1882	1973	Promoted Admiral in 1937
30 September 1933	Sir William Milbourne James, GCB	1881	1973	Promoted Admiral in 1938
30 September 1933	Hon. Arthur Charles Strutt, CBE	1878	1973	on the Retired list since 1929.
1 January 1936	Sir Francis Murray Austin, KBE, CB	1882	1953	
1 January 1936	Bernard William Murray Fairbairn	1880	1960	
1 January 1936	Arthur Lionel Snagge, CB	1878	1955	Retired List on 2 January 1936.
2 January 1936	Francis George Gillilan Chilton	1879	1964	
2 January 1936	Arthur Edward Frederick Bedford	1881	1949	Supernumerary.
2 January 1936	Sir Alexander Robert Maule Ramsay KCVO CB DSO	1881	1972	Promoted Admiral in 1939.
19 June 1936	Dudley Burton Napier North, GCVO, CB, CSI, CMG	1881	1961	Promoted Admiral in 1940.
12 July 1936	Noel Frank Laurence, KCB, DSO	1882	1970	Promoted Admiral in 1940.
22 July 1936	Andrew Browne Cunningham, Viscount Cunningham, KT, GCB, OM, DSO	1883	1963	Promoted Admiral in 1941.
27 June 1937	Sir St Aubyn Balwin Wake, KBE, CB	1882	1951	
28 June 1937	Sir Charles Edward Kennedy-Purvis, GBE, KCB	1884	1946	Promoted Admiral in 1942
6 May 1940	Sir Geoffrey Arbuthnot, KCB	1885	1957	
31 December 1943	Sir Louis Henry Keppel Hamilton, KCB, DSO	1890	1957	Promoted Admiral in 1947.
31 December 1943	Sir Irvine Gordon Glennie, KCB	1892	1980	Retired List in 1947; promoted Admiral on the Retired List in 1947.
7 February 1944	Sir Arthur Francis Eric Palliser, KCB, DSC	1890	1956	Promoted Admiral in 1947.
	Sir Geoffrey John Audley Miles, KCB, KCSI	1890	1986	Promoted Admiral in 1948.
15 June 1944	Sir Frederick Hew George Dalrymple-Hamilton, KCB	1890	1974	Promoted Admiral in 1948.
30 June 1944	Sir Denis William Boyd, KCB, CBE, DSC	1891	1965	Promoted Admiral in 1948.
	Sir Charles Eric Morgan, KCB, DSO	1889	1951	Retired List on 11 January 1948.
20 December 1945	Sir Douglas Blake Fisher, KCB, KBE	1890	1963	Retired List on 13 July 1948; promoted Admiral on the Retired List in 1949.
1 February 1946	Sir Cecil Halliday Jepson Harcourt, GBE, KCB	1892	1959	Promoted Admiral in 1949.
16 May 1947	Sir Ernest Russell Archer, KCB, CBE	1891	1958	Promoted Admiral in 1950.
4 January 1948	Sir Randolph Stewart Gresham Nicholson, KBE, CB, DSO, DSC	1892	1975	Retired List on 15 March 1950; promoted Admiral on the Retired List in 1951.
4 January 1948	Sir George Elvey Creasy, GCB, CBE, DSO, MVO	1895	1972	Promoted Admiral in 1951.
4 January 1948	Sir William Edward Parry, KCB	1893	1972	Promoted Admiral in 1951.
4 January 1948	Arthur George Talbot, CB, DSO	1892	1960	Retired List on the same day, 4 January 1948.
4 January 1948	Henry Jack Egerton, CB	1892	1972	Retired List on the same day, 4 January 1948.
21 January 1948	Sir Charles Henry Lawrence Woodhouse, KCB	1893	1978	Retired List on 15 August 1950; promoted Admiral on the Retired List in 1952.
21 January 1948	Richard Shelley, CB, CBE	1892	1968	Retired List on the same day, 21 February 1948.
13 June 1948	John George Lawrence Dundas	1893	1952	On Retired List since January 1946.
2 September 1948	Gervase Boswell Middleton, CB, CBE	1893	1961	Retired List on 1 December 1950; promoted Admiral on the Retired List in 1952.
2 September 1948	Sir Edward Desmond Bewley McCarthy, KCB, DSO	1893	1966	Retired List on 15 December 1950; promoted Admiral on the Retired List in 1952.
26 September 1948	Robert Don Oliver, CB, CBE, DSC	1895	1980	Retired List on the same day, 26 September 1948.
26 September 1948	Sir Arthur Robin Moore Bridge, KBE, CB	1894	1971	Retired List in 1951; promoted Admiral on the Retired List in 1952.
22 October 1948	Edmund Gerard Noel Rushbrooke, CBE, DSC	1892	1972	On the Retired List since 1947.
February 1949	Sir Geoffrey Nigel Oliver, GBE, KCB, DSO	1898	1980	Promoted Admiral in 1952.
22 June 1949	Louis Mountbatten, 1st Earl Mountbatten of Burma, KG, GCB, OM, GCSI, GCIE, GCVO, DSO	1900	1979	Promoted Admiral in 1953.
22 June 1949	Gerald Maxwell Bradshaw Langley, CB, OBE	1895		Retired List on the same day, 22 June 1949.
	Sir Alexander Cumming Gordon Madden, KCB, CBE	1895	1964	Promoted Admiral in 1952?
3 August 1949	Patrick William Beresford Brooking, CB, DSO	1896		Retired List on 15 August 1950; promoted Admiral on the Retired List in 1953.
30 September 1949	Sir Maurice James Mansergh, KCB, CBE	1896	1966	Promoted Admiral in 1953.
1 May 1950	Sir Henry William Urquhart McCall, KCVO, KBE, CB, DSO	1895	1980	Promoted Admiral in 1953.
1 May 1950	Sir Philip King Enright, KBE, CB	1894	1960	Promoted Admiral in 1953.
1950	Sir William Gladstone Agnew, KCVO, CB, DSO	1898	1960	On the Retired list since earlier that year.
15 August 1950	Sir William Rudolph Slayter, KCB, DSO, DSC	1896	1971	Promoted Admiral in 1953.
15 August 1950	Sir Geoffrey Alan Brooke Hawkins, KBE, CB, MVO, DSC	1895	1980	Retired List on 4 December 1952; promoted Admiral on the Retired List in 1953.
15 August 1950	Douglas Young-Jamieson, CB	1893	1955	Retired List on the same day, 15 August 1950.
15 August 1950	Clifford Caslon, CB, CBE	1896		Retired List on the same day, 15 August 1950.
1 December 1950	Sir Charles Edward Lambe, GCB, CVO	1900	1960	Promoted Admiral in 1954.
1 December 1950	Sir William Gerrard Andrewes, KBE, CB, DSO	1899	1974	Promoted Admiral in 1954.
1 December 1950	Sir William York La Roche Beverley, KBE, CB	1895	1982	Retired List on 16 December 1954.
1 December 1950	Lachlan Donald Mackintosh, CB, DSO, DSC	1896	1957	Retired List on the same day, 1 December 1950.
1 December 1950	Brian Betham Schofield, CB, CBE	1895		Retired List on the same day, 1 December 1950.
1 December 1950	Sir Horace Geoffrey Norman, KCVO, CB, CBE	1896		Retired List on the same day, 1 December 1950.
1 December 1950	Basil Charles Barrington Brooke, CB, CBE	1895	1983	On the Retired List since 1949.
15 December 1950	Sir Peveril Barton Reibey Wallop William-Powlett, KCB, KCMG, CBE, DSO	1898	1985	Retired List on 8 September 1954.
15 January 1951	Sir Cecil Aubrey Lawson Mansergh, KBE, CB, DSC	1898	1990	Retired List on 16 December 1954.
	Sir John Augustine Collins, KBE, CB	1899	1989	Retired in 1955.
	Eric William Longley Longley-Cook, CB, CBE, DSO	1898	1983	Retired in 1951.
	Sir Alan Kenneth Scott-Moncrieff, KCB, CBE	1900	1980	Promoted Admiral in 1956.
	Sir Ralph Alan Bevan Edwards, KCB, CBE	1901	1963	Promoted Admiral in 1955
	Sir John Arthur Symons Eccles, GCB, KCVO, CBE	1898	1966	Promoted Admiral in 1955.
	Sir William Wellclose Davis, GCB, DSO	1901	1987	Promoted Admiral in 1956.
	Sir Kenneth Alexander Ingleby-MacKenzie, KBE, CB			Surgeon Vice Admiral; Retired List on 30 April 1956.
15 August 1951	Sir Albert Lawrence Poland, KBE, CB, DSO, DSC	1895	1967	Retired List on 16 December 1954.
15 October 1951	Sir Charles Thomas Mark Pizey, GBE, CB, DSO	1899	1993	Promoted Admiral in 1954.
15 May 1952	Sir Frederick Robertson Parham, GBE, KCB, DSO	1901	1991	Promoted Admiral in 1956
1 September 1952	Sir Edward Michael Conolly Abel Smith, GCVO, CB	1899	1985	Retired List on 14 February 1958.
27 January 1953	Sir Archibald Day, KBE, CB, DSO	1899	1970	Retired List in 1955.
18 March 1953	Sir Ian Murray Robertson Campbell, KBE, CB, DSO	1898	1980	Retired List on 12 July 1956.
	Sir Charles Fred Wivell Norris, KBE, CB, DSO	1900	1989	Retired List on 10 December 1956.
	Sir John Felgate Stevens, KBE, CB	1900	1989	Retired List on 29 February 1956.
30 March 1954	Sir Caspar John, GCB	1903	1984	Promoted Admiral in 1957.
16 September 1954	Sir John William Musgrave Eaton, KBE, CB, DSO, DSC	1902	1981	Retired on 31 January 1958.
16 December 1954	Sir Arthur Gordon Voules Hubback, KBE, CB	1902	1970	Retired List on 3 November 1958.
16 December 1954	Jocelyn Stuart Cambridge Salter, CB, DSO, OBE	1901	1989	Retired list on 3 December 1957.
16 December 1954	Sir Maxwell Richmond, KBE, CB, DSO	1900	1986	
16 December 1954	Sir Stephen Hope Carlill, KBE, CB, DSO	1902	1996	Retired list on 7 July 1959.
c 1954	Sir Frank Trowbridge Mason, KCB		1988	Retired list on 23 September 1957.
	Sir Maurice H. Elliott, KCB, CBE			Retired list on 4 August 1957.
c 1955	Sir Peter Grenville Lyon Cazalet, KBE, CB, DSO, DSC	1899	1982	Retired List on 10 January 1957.
1 February 1955	Sir Gerald Vaughan Gladstone, GBE, KCB	1901	1978	Promoted Admiral in 1958.
22 April 1955	Leslie Newton Brownfield, CB, CBE	1901	1968	Retired List on 28 December 1957.
1 December 1955	Sir Richard George Onslow, KCB, DSO	1904	1975	Promoted Admiral in 1959.
29 February 1956	Sir Walter Thomas Couchman, KCB, CVO, DSO, OBE	1905	1981	Promoted Admiral in 1959.
29 February 1956	Ballin Illingworth Robertshaw, CB, CBE			
30 June 1956	Sir Hilary Worthington Biggs, KBE, CB, DSO	1905	1976	Retired in 1958.
12 July 1956	Sir Robin Leonard Francis Durnford-Slater, KCB	1902	1984	Promoted Admiral in 1959.
10 December 1956	Sir Arthur Reid Pedder, KBE, CB	1904	1995	Retired in 1959
	Sir Guy Bourchier Sayer, KBE, CB, DSC	1903	1985	Retired List on 28 February 1959.
	Sir William Geoffrey Arthur Robson, KBE, CB, DSO	1902	1989	Retired List on 7 July 1958.
	Sir John Peter Lorne Reid, GCB, CVO	1903	1973	Promoted Admiral in 1958.
	Sir Robert Cyril May, KBE, CB			Surgeon Vice-Admiral; Retired List on 30 April 1960.
27 December 1957	Sir William Kaye Edden, KBE, CB	1905	1990	Retired List on 21 May 1960.
7 January 1958	Sir John Gilchrist Thesiger Inglis, KBE, CB	1906	1972	Retired in 1960.
31 January 1958	Sir John David Luce, KCB	1906	1971	Promoted Admiral in 1960.
31 January 1958	Sir Wilfrid John Wentworth Woods, GBE, KCB	1906	1975	Promoted Admiral in 1960.
14 February 1958	Sir Douglas Eric Holland-Martin, GCB, DSO, DSC	1906	1977	Promoted Admiral in 1961.
	Sir Manley Laurence Power, KCB, CBE, DSC	1904	1981	Promoted Admiral in 1960.
	Sir Alexander Noel Campbell Bingley, GCB, OBE	1905	1972	Promoted Admiral in 1960.
7 July 1958	Sir Laurence Durlacher KCB OBE DSC	1904	1986	Promoted Admiral in 1961.
	Sir Charles Madden, 2nd Baronet	1906	2001	Promoted Admiral in 1961.
3 November 1958	Sir St John Reginald Joseph Tyrwhitt, 2nd Bt, KCB, DSO, DSC	1905	1961	Promoted Admiral in 1961.
31 January 1959	Sir Royston Hollis Wright, GBE, KCB, DSC	1908	1977	Promoted Admiral in 1962.
28 February 1959	Sir Charles Leo Glandore Evans, KCB, CBE, DSO, DSC	1908	1981	Retired in 1962
28 July 1959	Sir John Strike Lancaster, KBE, CB	1903	1992	Retired list on 17 July 1962.
	Sir Peter Dawnay, KCVO, CB, DSC			Retired list on 1 February 1962.
	Sir William Robert Sylvester Panckridge, KBE, CB			Surgeon Vice Admiral; Retired list on 30 April 1963.
	Sir William Godfrey Crawford, KBE, CB, DSC	1907	2003	Retired list on 20 February 1963.
	Sir Nicholas Alfred Copeman, KBE, CB, DSC	1906	1969	Retired list on 11 March 1963.
	Sir Reginald Thomas Sandars, KBE, CB			Retired list on 26 May 1962.
	Sir John Michael Villiers, KCB, OBE	1907	1990	Retired list on 26 November 1963.
21 May 1960	Sir Varyl Cargill Begg, GCB, DSO, DSC	1908	1995	Promoted Admiral in 1963.
22 July 1960	Sir Robert Alastair Ewing, KBE, CB, DSC	1909	1997	Retired list on 9 August 1962.
17 August 1960	Sir Nigel Stuart Henderson, GCB, KCB	1909	1993	Promoted Admiral in 1963.
22 August 1960	Sir Hector Charles Donald Maclean, KBE, CB, DSC	1908	2003	
	Sir Desmond Parry Dreyer, GCB, DSC	1910	2003	Promoted Admiral in 1965.
10 March 1961	Peter William Gretton, KCB, DSO, OBE	1912	1992	Fifth Sea Lord, 1962; Retired List on 30 May 1963.
12 April 1961	Sir John Graham Hamilton, GBE, CB	1910	1994	Promoted Admiral in 1965.
25 October 1961	Sir Michael Le Fanu, GCB, DSC	1913	1970	Promoted Admiral in 1965.
8 November 1961	Sir Norman Egbert Denning, KBE, CB	1904	1979	Retired List on 28 September 1965.
26 May 1962	Sir Richard Michael Smeeton, KCB, MBE	1912	1992	Retired List on 5 November 1965.
17 July 1962	Sir Arthur Richard Hezlet, KBE, CB, DSO, DSC	1914	2007	Retired List on 31 July 1964.
9 August 1962	Sir John Byng Frewen, GCB	1911	1975	Promoted Admiral in 1966.
	Sir Arthur Ellison Fitzroy Talbot, KBE, CB, DSO	1909	1998	Retired list on 30 August 1967.
20 February 1963	Sir Frank Roddam Twiss, KCB, KCVO, DSC	1910	1994	Promoted Admiral in 1967.
15 March 1963	Sir Antony Bartholomew Cole, KBE, CB, DSC			Retired List on 7 August 1965.
6 April 1963	Sir Ronald Vernon Brockman, KCB, CSI, CIE, CVO, CBE	1909	1999	Retired list on 6 December 1965.
30 April 1963	Sir Derek Duncombe Steele-Perkins, KCB, KCVO	1908	1994	Surgeon Vice Admiral;
30 May 1963	Sir Isaac William Trant Beloe, KBE, CB, DSC	1909	1966	
14 August 1963	Jack Percival Scatchard, CB, DSC	1910	2001	Retired List on 19 August 1964.
31 July 1964	Sir Raymond Shale Hawkins, KCB	1909	1987	Retired in 1967.
19 August 1964	Sir Hugh Stirling Mackenzie, KCB, DSO, DSC	1913	1996	Retired List on 20 September 1968.
5 June 1965	Sir Horace Rochfort Law, GCB, OBE, DSC	1911	2005	Promoted Admiral in 1968.
16 June 1965	Sir Hugh Martell, KBE, CB	1912	1998	Retired List on 14 December 1967.
7 August 1965	Peter John Hill-Norton, Baron Hill-Norton, GCB	1915	2004	Promoted Admiral in 1968.
11 August 1965	Sir Charles Peter Graham Walker, KBE, CB, DSC			Retired list on 30 September 1967.
28 September 1965	John Michael Dudgeon Gray, KBE, CB	1913	1998	Retired list on 29 September 1967.
29 September 1965	Sir John Osler Chattock Hayes, KCB, OBE	1913	1998	Retired in 1968.
9 February 1966	Sir Horace Collier Lyddon, KBE, CB	1912	1968	
13 April 1966	Sir Ian Leslie Trower Hogg, KCB, DSC	1911	2003	Retired list on 6 April 1970.
1966	Sir Eric Dick Caldwell, KBE, CB	1907	2000	Surgeon Vice Admiral; Retired list on 11 August 1969.
	Sir Charles Piercy Mills, KCB, CBE, DSC	1914	2006	Retired in 1969.
29 September 1967	Sir Patrick Uniacke Bayly, KBE, CB, DSC	1914	1998	Retired list on 15 July 1970.
29 September 1967	Sir Donald Cameron Ernest Forbes Gibson, KCB, DSC			Retired
30 September 1967	Wilfred John Parker, CB, OBE, DSC			Retired
27 November 1967	Sir Hugh Richard Benest Janvrin, KCB, DSC	1915	1993	Retired list on 15 January 1971.
14 December 1967	Sir Ian Lachlan Mackay McGeoch, KCB, DSO, DSC	1914	2007	Retired in 1970.
14 December 1967	Sir William Donough O'Brien, KCB, DSC	1916	2016	Promoted Admiral in 1970.
26 December 1967	Sir Michael Patrick Pollock, GCB, LVO, DSC	1916	2006	Promoted Admiral in 1970.
June 1968	Sir Arthur Francis Turner, KCB, DSC	1912	1991	Promoted Admiral in 1970.
24 July 1968	Sir Edward Beckwith Ashmore, GCB, DSC	1919	2016	Promoted Admiral in 1970.
20 September 1968	Sir Peter Maxwell Compston, KCB	1915	2000	Retired list on 24 December 1970.
20 September 1968	Sir Andrew MacKenzie Lewis, KCB	1918	1993	Promoted Admiral in 1971.
1 October 1968	Dennis Howard Mason, CB, CVO	1916	1996	Retired List on 7 October 1970.
13 November 1968	Sir Anthony Templer Frederick Griffith Griffin, GCB	1920	1996	Promoted Admiral in 1971.
5 December 1968	Sir Robert George Raper, KCB	1915	1990	Retired List on 6 July 1974.
14 July 1969	Sir Eric Blackburn Bradbury, KBE, CB	1911	2003	Surgeon Rear-Admiral; Retired in 1972.
16 October 1969	Sir Peter William Beckwith Ashmore, KCB, KCVO, DSC	1921	2002	Retired list on 12 December 1972.
6 April 1970	Denis Bryan Harvey Wildish, CB	1914	2017	Retired list on 14 September 1972.
21 April 1970	Sir Leslie Derek Empson, GBE, KCB	1918	1997	Promoted Admiral in 1972.
21 April 1970	Sir John Edward Ludgate Martin, KCB, DSC	1918	2011	Retired list on 24 April 1973.
21 April 1970	Sir Louis Edward Stewart Holland Le Bailly, KBE, CB	1915	2010	Retired list on 2 September 1972.
10 June 1970	Sir Michael Frampton Fell, KCB, DSO, DSC	1918	1976	Retired list on 7 October 1974.
15 July 1970	Sir John Charles Young Roxburg, KCB, CBE, DSO, DSC	1919	2004	Retired List on 3 October 1972.
7 October 1970	Terence Thornton Lewin, Baron Lewin, KG, GCB, LVO, DSC	1920	1999	Promoted Admiral in 1973.
20 November 1970	Sir Ian Stewart McIntosh, KBE, CB, DSO, DSC	1919	2003	Retired list on 5 September 1973.
24 December 1970	Sir John Rae McKaig, KCB, CBE	1922	1996	Promoted Admiral in 1974.
21 August 1971	Sir George Francis Allan Trewby, KCB	1917	2001	Retired List on 19 August 1974.
29 November 1971	Sir Arthur Mackenzie Power, KCB, MBE	1921	1984	Retired list on 7 April 1975.
1 August 1972	Sir Edward Gerard Napier Mansfield, KBE, CVO	1921	2006	Retired list on 7 July 1975.
2 September 1972	Sir John Anthony Rose Troup, KCB, DSC	1921	2008	Retired in 1977.
14 September 1972	Sir Ian Easton, KCB, DSC	1917	1989	Promoted Admiral.
3 October 1972	Sir John Ernle Pope, KCB	1921	1998	Retired list on 7 October 1976.
24 April 1973	Sir Iwan Geoffrey Raikes, KCB, CBE, DSC	1921	2011	Retired List on 25 January 1977.
5 September 1973	Sir David Williams, GCB	1921	2012	Promoted Admiral in 1974.
1 December 1973	Sir Peter White, GBE	1919	2010	Promoted Admiral in 1976.
1 December 1973	Sir John Deveraux Treacher, KCB	1924	2018	Promoted Admiral in 1975.
13 May 1974	Sir Philip Alexander Watson, KBE, LVO	1919	2009	Retired List on 31 March 1977.
6 July 1974	Sir Henry Conyers Leach, GCB	1923	2011	Promoted Admiral in 1977.
8 September 1974	Sir James George Jungius, KBE	1923	2020	Retired List on 21 April 1980.
	Sir Peter Murray Austin, KCB			Retired list on 7 October 1976.
	Sir Allen Gordon Tait, KCB	1921	2005	Promoted Admiral in 1978.
	Sir James Watt, KBE	1914	2009	Surgeon Vice Admiral; Retired List on 30 March 1977.
7 April 1975	Sir Anthony Storrs Morton, GBE, KCB	1923	2006	Promoted Admiral in 1979.
7 April 1975	Sir Raymond Derek Lygo, KCB	1924	2012	Promoted Admiral in 1977.
15 December 1975	Sir Richard Pilkington Clayton, GCB	1925	1984	Promoted Admiral in 1978.
6 January 1976	Sir Lancelot Richard Bell Davies, KBE			
28 June 1976	Sir Roderick Douglas Macdonald, KBE	1921	2001	Retired List on 16 May 1979.
7 October 1976	Sir Arthur Desmond Cassidi, GCB	1925	2019	Promoted Admiral in 1979.
7 October 1976	Sir Peter Egerton Capel Berger, KCB, LVO, DSC	1925	2003	Retired list on 7 April 1981.
25 January 1977	Sir James Henry Fuller Eberle, GCB	1927	2018	Promoted Admiral in 1979.
9 February 1977	Sir John Morrison Forbes, KCB	1925	2021	Retired List on 2 April 1979.
30 March 1977	Sir John Stuart Pepys Rawlins, KBE	1922	2011	Surgeon Vice Admiral; Retired List on 17 May 1980.
31 March 1977	Sir Cameron Rusby, KCB, LVO	1926	2013	Retired List on 22 October 1982.
31 March 1977	Sir David Anning Loram, KCB, CVO	1924	2011	Retired List on 2 May 1980.
2 September 1977	Sir Stephen Ferrier Berthon, KCB	1922	2007	Retired list on 3 April 1981.
14 March 1978	Sir Roy William Halliday, KBE, DSC	1923	2007	Retired list on 4 April 1981.
28 March 1978	Sir John Stuart Crosbie Lea, KBE	1923	2015	Retired List on 11 April 1980.
1 April 1978	John Fieldhouse, Baron Fieldhouse, GCB, GBE	1928	1992	Promoted Admiral in 1981.
2 April 1979	Sir William Thomas Pillar, GBE, KCB	1924	1999	Promoted Admiral in 1982.
4 May 1979	Sir Peter William Buchanan, KBE	1925	2011	Retired list on 5 April 1982.
16 May 1979	Sir Thomas Henry Eustace Baird, KCB	1924		Retired List on 1 April 1982.
6 July 1979	Sir Lindsay Sutherlands Bryson, KCB	1925	2005	Promoted Admiral in 1983.
27 September 1979	Sir Edwin John Horlick, KBE	1925	2021	Retired list on 27 June 1983.
18 March 1980	Sir John Albert Bews Harrison, KBE			Surgeon Vice Admiral; Retired list on 30 August 1983.
11 April 1980	Sir William Doveton Minet Staveley, GCB	1928	1997	Promoted Admiral in 1982.
2 May 1980	Robert Risley Squires	1927	2016	Retired list on 1 February 1984.
18 November 1980	Sir Simon Alastair Cassillis Cassels, KCB, CBE	1928	2019	Promoted Admiral in 1984.
4 April 1981	Sir John Michael Holland Cox, KCB	1928	2006	Retired list on 16 December 1983.
7 April 1981	Sir James Edward Campbell Kennon, KCB, CBE	1925	1991	Retired list on 24 February 1984.
23 July 1981	Sir Peter Geoffrey Marshall Herbert, KCB, OBE	1929	2019	Promoted Admiral in 1983.
1 April 1982	Sir David John Hallifax, KCB, KCVO, KBE	1927	1992	Promoted Admiral in 1986.
5 April 1982	Sir John Frederick Cadell, KBE	1929	1998	Retired List on 2 July 1985.
8 June 1982	Sir Edward Rosebery Anson, KCB			Retired List on 3 November 1984.
23 September 1982	Sir David Worthington Brown, KCB	1927	2005	Retired list on 25 July 1985.
1 October 1982	Sir Peter Maxwell Stanford, GCB, LVO	1929	1991	Promoted Admiral in 1985.
11 April 1983	Sir Anthony Sanders Tippet, KCB	1928	2006	Retired List on 20 January 1987.
28 June 1983	Roger John William Lambert		1984	Surgeon Vice Admiral
1 July 1983	Sir Derek Roy Reffell, KCB	1928		Promoted Admiral in 1988.
6 December 1983	Sir Nicholas John Streynsham Hunt, GCB, LVO	1930	2013	Promoted Admiral in 1985.
24 February 1984	Sir Richard George Alison Fitch, KCB	1929	1994	
7 September 1984	Sir John Forster Woodward, GBE, KCB	1932	2013	Promoted Admiral in 1987.
15 November 1984	Sir Robert William Frank Gerken, KCB, CBE	1932	2022	Retired List on 29 April 1987.
23 November 1984	Sir Geoffrey Thomas James Oliver Dalton, KCB	1931	2020	Retired List on 10 September 1987.
25 March 1985	Sir Patrick Jeremy Symons, KBE			
10 May 1985	Sir George Montague Francis Vallings, KCB	1932	2007	Retired List on 18 November 1987.
29 May 1985	Sir John Morrison Webster, KCB	1932	2020	Retired List on 1 June 1990.
3 January 1986	Sir John Julian Robertson Oswald, GCB	1933	2011	Promoted Admiral in 1987.
26 August 1986	Sir Hugh Leslie Owen Thompson, KBE	1931	1996	Retired List 1990
15 October 1986	Sir John Jeremy Black, GBE, KCB, DSO	1932	2015	Promoted Admiral in 1989
22 December 1986	Sir David Benjamin Bathurst, GCB	1936	2025	Promoted Admiral in 1989.
	Sir Michael Howard Livesay, KCB	1936	2003	Promoted Admiral
10 April 1987	Sir William Richard Scott Thomas, KCB, KCVO, OBE	1932	1998	
20 October 1987	Sir John Cunningham Kirkwood Slater, GCB, LVO	1938		Promoted Admiral in 1991.
1 January 1988	Sir Godfrey James Milton-Thompson, KBE	1930	2012	Surgeon Vice Admiral; Retired List in 1995.
1 February 1988	Sir John Beverley Kerr, GCB	1937	2019	Promoted Admiral in 1991.
10 March 1988	Sir Norman Ross Dutton King, KBE	1933	2013	Retired List on 26 June 1991.
28 September 1988	Sir Brian Thomas Brown KCB CBE	1934	2020	Promoted Admiral in 1989.
	Sir Alan Grose, KBE	1937		
	Sir Robert Charles Finch Hill, KBE			
1989	Sir James Lamb Weatherall, KCVO, KBE	1936	2018	
	Sir Barry Nigel Wilson, KCB	1936	2018	Retired in 1992
1989	Sir Kenneth John Eaton, GBE, KCB	1934	2022	Promoted Admiral in 1993.
	Sir Robert Hill, KBE		2026	Retired List, 17 April 1993.
1991?	Sir Neville Purvis, KCB	1936		Retired List, 18 April 1994.
	Sir John Francis Coward, KCB, DSO	1937	2020	Retired List, 29 May 1994.
	Sir David Stuart Dobson, KBE	1938		Retired List, 1 June 1994.
1991?	Sir Anthony Peter Woodhead, KCB	1939		Retired List, 30 April 1994.
	Sir Michael Henry Gordon Layard, KCB, CBE	1936		Promoted Admiral
1992	Sir Geoffrey William Roger Biggs, KCB	1938	2002	Retired List, 29 April 1995.
	The Honourable Sir Nicholas John Hill-Norton, KCB	1939		Retired List, 2 June 1995.
	Sir Michael Antony Claes Moore, KBE, LVO	1942		Retired List, 15 January 1998.
1993?	Sir Peter Charles Abbott, GBE, KCB	1942	2015	Promoted Admiral in 1995.
	Anthony Leslie Revell, CB, QHS	1935	2018	Surgeon Vice Admiral; Retired List, 28 April 1997.
	Sir Charles Christopher Morgan, KBE	1939		
	Sir Richard Tobias Frere, KCB	1938	2020	Retired List on 11 July 1997.
	Sir Roy Thomas Newman, KCB	1936		Retired List on 26 April 1996.
	Sir Jonathan James Richard Tod, KCB, CBE	1939		Retired List on 29 August 1997.
	Sir Robert Walmsley, KCB	1941	2022	
February 1994	Michael Cecil Boyce, Baron Boyce, KG, GCB, OBE	1943	2022	Promoted Admiral in 1995.
1994	Michael Peter Gretton, CB	1946		Retired List on 21 April 1998.
April 1995	Sir John Richard Brigstocke, KCB	1945	2020	Promoted Admiral in 1997.
	Sir Ian David Graham Garnett, KCB	1944		Promoted Admiral in 2001.
	Sir John Hugh Dunt, KCB	1944		Retired List on 11 July 2000.
	John Henry Stuart McAnally, CB, LVO	1945		Retired List 2001.
	Sir Fabian Michael Malbon, KBE	1946		Retired List on 15 June 2002.
	Sir Jeremy Joe Blackham, KCB	1943		Retired List on 8 September 2002.
	Sir Andrew David Hugh Mathews, KCB	1958		Retired List on 26 March 2014.
	Sir David Anthony James Blackburn, KCVO, CB	1945		Retired List on 12 February 2000.
	Ian Lawrence Jenkins, CB, CVO	1944	2009	Surgeon Vice Admiral; Retired List on 16 January 2007.
	Peter Arthur Dunt, CB	1947		Retired List on 9 August 2007.
	Sir Peter Spencer, KCB	1947		Retired List on 25 April 2003.
	Robert George Cooling, CB	1957		Retired List on 31 Mar 2012
	Sir Paul Lambert, KCB	1954		Retired List on 3 April 2012.
	Philip Iain Raffaelli, CB	1955		Surgeon Vice Admiral; Retired List on 15 May 2013.
October 1997	Alan William John West, Baron West of Spithead, GCB, DSC	1948		Promoted Admiral in 2000.
	Sir Paul Kenneth Haddacks, KCB	1946		
January 2000	Sir Jonathon Band, GCB	1950		Promoted Admiral in 2002.
14 November 2002	The Prince Charles, Prince of Wales, KG, KT, GCB, OM	1948		Promoted Admiral in 2006.
2003	Sir James Michael Burnell-Nugent, KCB, CBE	1949		Promoted Admiral in 2005.
18 June 2004	Sir Timothy Pentreath McClement, KCB, OBE	1951		Retired List on 26 December 2006
16 September 2004	Rory Alistair Ian McLean, CB, OBE	1950		Retired List on 6 December 2007.
25 October 2005	Sir Adrian James Johns, KCB, CBE	1951		Retired List on 4 November 2008.
10 January 2006	Charles Rodney Style, CBE	1954		Retired List on 11 January 2008.
30 March 2006	Sir Anthony Knox Dymock, KBE, CB	1949		Retired List on 18 February 2009.
31 October 2006	Robin Paul Boissier, CB	1953		Retired List on 3 July 2009.
16 January 2007	Sir Trevor Alan Soar, KCB, OBE	1957		Promoted Admiral in 2009.
30 April 2007	Sir Timothy James Hamilton Laurence, KCVO, CB	1955		Retired List on 15 August 2010.
31 August 2007	Peter John Wilkinson, CB, CVO	1956		Retired List on 21 October 2010.
2008	Sir Richard Jeffrey Ibbotson, KBE, CB, DSC	1954		Retired List on 19 May 2011.
15 July 2008	Sir Alan Michael Massey, KCB, CBE	1953		Retired List on 8 October 2010.
1 December 2009	The Princess Anne, Princess Royal, KG, KT, GCVO	1950		Promoted Admiral in 2012.
19 July 2010	Sir Charles Percival Ross Montgomery, KBE	1955		Retired List on 16 March 2013.
18 January 2011	Sir George Michael Zambellas, GCB, DSC	1958		Promoted Admiral in 2012.
22 November 2011	Sir Charles Anthony Johnstone-Burt, KCVO, CB, OBE	1958		Retired List on 30 November 2013.
13 December 2011	Sir Philip Andrew Jones, GCB	1960		Promoted Admiral in 2016.
19 January 2012	Alan David Richards, CB	1958		Retired List on 7 May 2015.
10 October 2012	Sir David George Steel, KBE	1961		Retired List on 15 October 2015.
14 February 2013	Peter Derek Hudson, CB, CBE	1961		Retired List on 30 January 2016.
30 May 2013	Sir Ian Fergus Corder, KBE, CB	1960		Retired List on 1 July 2016.
27 November 2013	Sir Simon Robert Lister, KCB, OBE	1959		Retired List on 25 October 2019.
18 September 2014	Duncan Laurence Potts, CB	1961		Retired List on 13 October 2018.
19 February 2015	The Prince Andrew, Duke of York, KG, GCVO	1960		
9 March 2015	Prince Michael of Kent, GCVO	1942		Honorary Vice-Admiral Royal Naval Reserve.
10 March 2015	Sir Simon Jonathan Woodcock, KCB, OBE	1962		Retired List on 30 June 2018.
2 April 2015	Jeffrey Maurice Sterling, Baron Sterling of Plaistow, GCVO, CBE	1934		Honorary Vice-Admiral Royal Naval Reserve.
2 April 2015	Sir Frederick Donald Gosling, KCVO	1929	2019	Honorary Vice-Admiral Royal Naval Reserve.
15 October 2015	Sir Clive Charles Carruthers Johnstone, KBE, CB	1963	2024	Retired List on 1 January 2020.
17 December 2015	Alasdair James Walker, CB, OBE	1956	2019	Surgeon Vice-Admiral; Surgeon General of the Armed Forces 2015–2018; Retired List on 1 May 2019.
10 February 2016	Sir Benjamin John Key, KCB, CBE	1965		Promoted Admiral in 2021.
26 June 2017	Sir Timothy Peter Fraser, KCB	1959/60		Promoted Admiral in 2019.
27 March 2018	Sir Antony David Radakin, GBE, KCB	1965		Promoted Admiral in 2019.
16 July 2018	Paul Martin Bennett, CB, OBE	1964		Retired List on 1 February 2022.
5 March 2019	Jeremy Paul Kyd, CBE	1967		Retired List on 11 March 2022.
8 March 2019	Sir Christopher Reginald Summers Gardner, KBE	1962		
28 April 2019	Sir Nicholas William Hine, KCB	1966		Retired List on 5 May 2022.
20 May 2019	Sir Keith Edward Blount, KCB, OBE	1966		Promoted Admiral in 2023.
1 September 2020	Sir Richard Charles Thompson, KCB, CBE	1966		Retired List on 16 October 2024.
5 July 2021	Guy Antony Robinson, CB, OBE	1967		Retired List on 21 December 2024.
24 September 2021	Andrew Paul Burns, CB, OBE	1969		Retired List on 30 January 2026.
12 January 2022	Sir Martin John Connell, KCB, CBE	1968		Retired List on 28 January 2026.
12 December 2022	Philip John Hally, CB, MBE			Retired List on 8 April 2026.
13 January 2023	Sir Michael Keith Utley, KCB, OBE	1970		Retired List on 12 June 2026.
21 April 2023	Paul Marshall, CB, CBE			
18 September 2023	Sir Andrew Jeffery Kyte, KBE, CB	1966		
1 May 2024	Edward Graham Ahlgren, OBE	1971		
8 July 2024	Simon Philip Asquith, CB, OBE	1972		
14 October 2024	James David Morley, CB	1969		
5 September 2025	Stephen Mark Richard Moorhouse, CBE	1973		
30 September 2025	Paul S. Beattie, CBE			

== See also ==
- List of senior officers of the Royal Navy
- List of Royal Navy admirals
- List of Royal Navy rear admirals
- List of British Army full generals
