= Port Admiral, Devonport =

Office of the Port Admiral, Devonport
- Ensign of the Royal Navy
- Navy Department
- Reports to: Commander-in-Chief, Naval Home Command, (1969-1983)
- Appointer: Prime Minister; Subject to formal approval by the Queen-in-Council
- Term length: Not fixed
- Inaugural holder: Vice-Admiral Sir Rae McKaig
- Formation: 1970-1996

The Port Admiral, Devonport was a senior Royal Navy appointment first created in 1970. In September 1971 all remaining flag officers in the Royal Navy holding dual positions of Admiral Superintendents at Royal Navy Dockyards were re-designated as Port Admirals. This office was held jointly with that of the Flag Officer, Plymouth. It was abolished in 1996.

== History ==
On 30 December 1970, Vice-Admiral J R McKaig CBE was appointed as Port Admiral, Her Majesty's Naval Base, Devonport, and Flag Officer, Plymouth. On 15 September 1971, all Flag Officers of the Royal Navy holding positions of Admiral Superintendents at Royal Dockyards were restyled as Port Admirals.

== Office Holders ==
- 1970 – 1973 Vice-Admiral Sir Rae McKaig.
- 1973 – 1975 Vice-Admiral Sir Arthur Power
- 1975 – 1977 Vice-Admiral Sir Gordon Tait
- 1977 – 1979 Vice-Admiral Sir John Forbes
- 1979 – 1981 Vice-Admiral Sir Peter Berger.
- 1981 – 1982 Vice-Admiral Sir Simon Cassels.
- 1982 – 1985 Vice-Admiral Sir David Brown
- 1985 – 1987 Vice-Admiral Sir Robert Gerken.
- 1987 – 1990 Vice-Admiral Sir John Webster
- 1990 – 1992 Vice-Admiral Sir Alan Grose
- 1992 – 1996 Vice-Admiral Sir Roy Newman
