= Flag Officer, Plymouth =

Flag Officer Plymouth
- Reports to: Commander-in-Chief, Naval Home Command
- Formation: July 1969
- First holder: Vice-Admiral Sir Anthony Griffin
- Final holder: Vice-Admiral Sir Roy Newman
- Abolished: 1996

The Flag Officer Plymouth was a senior Royal Navy appointment first established in July 1969. The office holder was responsible for the administration of the facilities of the two major Royal Navy at Plymouth and Portsmouth. The appointment continued until 1996 when it was abolished.

From July 1970 all new appointees holding this title jointly held the title of Port Admiral, Devonport.

== History ==
The appointment was established in July 1969 when the two major home commanders-in-chief, Commander-in-Chief, Plymouth and Commander-in-Chief, Portsmouth were amalgamated into the new centralised Naval Home Command. As a result of these organisational changes Flag Officer Plymouth became one of the new area commanders subordinate to the Commander-in-Chief, Naval Home Command.

On 30 December 1970, Vice-Admiral J R McKaig CBE was appointed as Port Admiral, Devonport of HM Naval Base, Devonport, and Flag Officer, Plymouth. On 5 September 1971, all Royal Navy Flag Officers holding positions of Admiral Superintendents at Royal Naval Dockyards were restyled as Port Admirals.

== Office Holders ==
Included:

- Jul 1969 – Sept 1969 Vice-Admiral John Roxburgh
- 1969 – 1970 Vice-Admiral Sir Anthony Griffin
- 1970 – 1973 Vice-Admiral Sir Rae McKaig
- 1973 – 1975 Vice-Admiral Sir Arthur Power
- 1975 – 1977 Vice-Admiral Sir Gordon Tait
- 1977 – 1979 Vice-Admiral Sir John Forbes
- 1979 – 1981 Vice-Admiral Sir Peter Berger
- 1981 – 1982 Vice-Admiral Sir Simon Cassels
- 1982 – 1985 Vice-Admiral Sir David Brown
- 1985 – 1987 Vice-Admiral Sir Robert Gerken
- 1987 – 1990 Vice-Admiral Sir John Webster
- 1990 – 1992 Vice-Admiral Sir Alan Grose
- 1992 – 1996 Vice-Admiral Sir Roy Newman.
