= Admiral Power =

Admiral Power may refer to:

- Arthur Power (1889–1960), British Royal Navy admiral
- Arthur Mackenzie Power (1921–1984), British Royal Navy vice admiral
- Manley Laurence Power (1904–1981), British Royal Navy admiral
