= Charles Howeson =

British naval officer and convicted sexual abuser (born 1949)

- Born: Charles Arthur Howeson; November 1949
- Occupation: Royal Navy commander

Charles Arthur Howeson (born November 1949) is a former Royal Navy commander and convicted sex offender who was known as "Mr Plymouth". He was chairman of First Great Western and the South West Strategic Health Authority. He held a senior position at Coutts bank. Howeson Lane in Plymouth is named after him after he donated the land on which it was built. In June 2018 he was jailed for seven years and six months for sexually abusing eight men. One offence was committed while he was a lieutenant commander on HMS Cleopatra. Other sexual assault offences on volunteer workers were committed by him during his tenure at Groundwork Plymouth Area in the early 1990s. These latter offences were not appropriately dealt with at the time.
