= James Fanshawe (Royal Navy officer) =

Commodore James Fanshawe CBE
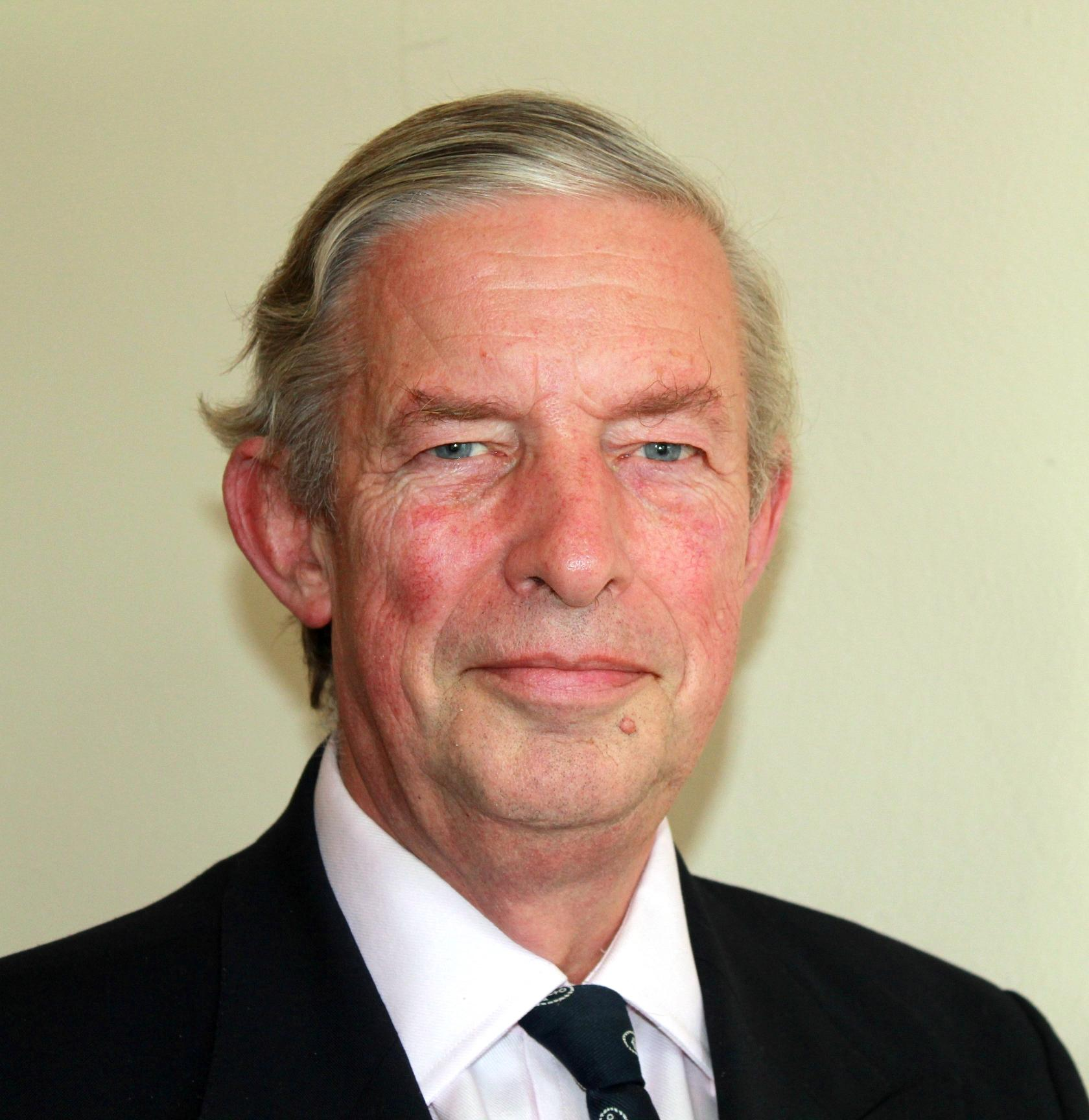
- Born: 1952 (age 73–74)
- Military career
- Allegiance: United Kingdom
- Branch: Royal Navy
- Service years: 1970 – 2005
- Rank: Commodore
- Commands: HMS Hurworth; HMS Cleopatra; HMS Fearless; Commander UK Task Group; Commander Devonport Flotilla
- Awards: Commander of the Order of the British Empire

Commodore James Fanshawe CBE (born 1953) is a retired Royal Navy officer. Fanshawe has been Chairman of numerous organisations since his retirement in 2005.

== Naval career ==
Fanshawe joined the Royal Navy in 1970 and rose to the rank of Commodore, notably commanding HMS Hurworth, HMS Cleopatra, HMS Fearless, UK Task Group and the Devonport Flotilla. He was Commander of the Coalition Maritime Component in the Middle East and Director of Plans at Permanent Joint Headquarters. He notably planned evacuation and stabilisation operations in Sierra Leone in 2000 which were central to Operation Palliser; he also took control of several response operations immediately following the September 11 attacks in 2001. Fanshawe received CBE in 2004 but retired one year later, after 35 years of service.

== Retirement ==
Since retiring from the Royal Navy in 2005, Fanshawe has been the defence advisor to Allocate Software plc., Chairman of the London Alumni branch of Manchester Business School, Executive Chairman of Marine One Stop Technologies Ltd and of the Home Port of Shoreham Trustee Company.

== Personal life ==
Fanshawe was educated firstly at St. George's School, Windsor Castle (where he was Head Chorister). From there he went onto Winchester College in Winchester, Hampshire before joining the Royal Navy in 1970. In 1999, he was made a Freeman of the City of London. He currently lives near Chichester with his wife. His brother was the composer, the late David Fanshawe.

=== Politics ===
Fanshawe was elected Chairman of the Chichester Conservative Association in March 2013.
