= Anthony Griffin (Royal Navy officer) =

Royal Navy Admiral (1920-1996)

Admiral Sir Anthony Griffin GCB
- Born: 24 November 1920; Peshawar, British India
- Died: 16 October 1996 (aged 75)
- Relatives: Admiral Sir Tom Phillips (uncle)
- Military career
- Allegiance: United Kingdom
- Branch: Royal Navy
- Service years: 1934 – 1975
- Rank: Admiral
- Commands: HMS Woodbridge Haven; HMS Ark Royal; Flag Officer, Plymouth
- Conflicts: World War II
- Awards: Knight Grand Cross of the Order of the Bath
- Other work: Businessman

Admiral Sir Anthony Templer Frederick Griffith Griffin GCB (24 November 1920 – 16 October 1996) was a Royal Navy officer who went on to be Controller of the Navy (1971–1975) and chairman of British Shipbuilders (1977–1980).

== Naval career ==
=== Early years (1934–1939) ===
Griffin joined the Royal Navy in 1934, serving as a cadet at Dartmouth Royal Naval College. He was posted in 1939 to HMS Gloucester, the flagship of the East Indies squadron.

=== Second World War (1939–1945) ===
Griffin began his Second World War service in HMS Gloucester patrolling off Madagascar guarding against German pocket-battleships. The Gloucester then moved to the Mediterranean, where it took part in the first action with the Italian Navy in July 1940 off Calabria. After returning to Britain to attend courses, Griffin sailed for Cape Town aboard SS Britannia when she was sunk by the German commerce raider Thor. Giffin's lifeboat sailed for the Cape Verde Islands, when they were rescued by SS Raranga and taken to Montevideo, Uruguay. From there he made his way to Gibraltar and was assigned to HMS Fury.

With Fury, Griffin served in the Mediterranean as part of Force H and as an escort to Convoy PQ 17 to the Soviet Union. Returning to the Mediterranean, Griffin sailed as part of Operation Pedestal to supply Malta in August 1942. The following month the ship then once again joined the Arctic Convoys, escorting Convoy PQ 18. Following promotion to lieutenant and being mentioned in dispatches, Griffin was made second-in-command of the new destroyer HMS Talybont. With Talybont, Griffin served in the Western Approaches. Qualifying as a navigator, he was briefly in the aircraft carrier HMS Implacable off the coast of Norway, where they launched her attacks on the Tirpitz. From there Griffin went to the Far East to serve in the escort carrier HMS Empress. There he was once again mentioned in dispatches.

=== Postwar service (1945–1971) ===
The 1950s saw Griffin promoted to commander in 1951 and captain in 1956. His varied postwar career took him from navigator in HMS Anson, service in aircraft carriers, radar research and development before taking command of the support ship HMS Woodbridge Haven. In 1964 he was given command of the aircraft carrier HMS Ark Royal, and in 1966 he took over as Naval Secretary and promoted to rear-admiral. He was made Assistant Chief of the Naval Staff (Warfare) later in 1966, Flag Officer Second in Command Far East Fleet in 1968 and Flag Officer, Plymouth and admiral superintendent at Devonport in 1969.

At one stage he was required to combine his roles of Admiral Superintendent of Plymouth dockyard with his flag officer position, doing one in the morning and another in the afternoon. Of this period he noted, "Sometimes I would write to myself. I was often quite rude to myself, too." He was promoted to admiral on 29 November 1971, and went on to be Controller of the Navy in 1971 before retiring in 1975. Griffin was appointed Knight Commander of the Bath in 1971 followed by the Knight Grand Cross upon his retirement.

== Post-naval career ==
In retirement he served as chairman of British Shipbuilders from 1977 to 1980. His period in charge of the nationalised shipbuilding company saw the lowest rate of industrial disputes on record. The in coming Conservative Government privatised the company. From there Griffin went on to become chair of the British Maritime League from 1982 to 1987, spent 10 years as vice-chairman of Wellington College and from 1981 to 1984 was president of the Royal Institution of Naval Architects. At the age of 68 he was awarded the Royal Humane Society award for bravery after diving into the River Thames to save a drowning man. The man perished despite Griffin's efforts to save him.

== Family ==
In 1943, he married Rosemary Hickling; they had two sons and one daughter. Lady Griffin died on 2 February 2015. His uncle, Admiral Sir Tom Phillips, was killed when HMS Prince of Wales was sunk in 1941.

Military offices
| Preceded by William O’Brien | Naval Secretary; January 1966–March 1966 | Succeeded by Gervaise Cooke |
| Preceded by Sir John Roxburgh | Flag Officer, Plymouth; 1969–1970 | Succeeded by Sir Rae McKaig |
| Preceded by Sir Michael Pollock | Controller of the Navy; 1971–1975 | Succeeded by Sir Richard Clayton |
Honorary titles
| Preceded by Sir Derek Empson | Rear-Admiral of the United Kingdom; November 1986–October 1988 | Succeeded by Sir Anthony Morton |
| Preceded by Sir Derek Empson | Vice-Admiral of the United Kingdom; October 1988–November 1988 | Succeeded by Sir Anthony Morton |
