= John Roxburgh (Royal Navy officer) =

Vice-Admiral Sir John Roxburgh KCB CBE DSO DSC*
- Born: 29 June 1919
- Died: 13 April 2004 (aged 84)
- Military career
- Allegiance: United Kingdom
- Branch: Royal Navy
- Service years: 1933–1972
- Rank: Vice-Admiral
- Commands: HMS H43; HMS United; HMS Tapir; HMS Turpin; HMS Contest; HMS Eagle; Flag Officer Sea Training; Flag Officer, Plymouth; Flag Officer Submarines
- Conflicts: World War II
- Awards: Knight Commander of the Order of the Bath; Commander of the Order of the British Empire; Distinguished Service Order; Distinguished Service Cross &bar

Vice-Admiral Sir John Charles Young Roxburgh, KCB, CBE, DSO, DSC & Bar (29 June 1919 – 13 April 2004) was a Royal Navy officer who became Flag Officer, Plymouth.

== Naval career ==
Educated at Royal Naval College, Dartmouth, Roxburgh joined the Royal Navy in 1933. He commanded the submarines HMS H43, HMS United and HMS Tapir during World War II. After the war he commanded the submarine HMS Turpin and the destroyer HMS Contest.

He was appointed Deputy Director of Plans (Navy) at the Ministry of Defence in 1964, Commanding Officer of the aircraft carrier HMS Eagle in 1965 and Flag Officer Sea Training in 1967. He went on to be Flag Officer, Plymouth in July 1969 and Flag Officer Submarines in September 1969 before retiring in 1972.

In retirement he was Chairman of the Grovebell Group, President of the Royal Naval Benevolent Trust, Chairman of The Freedom Association's management committee and a Surrey county councillor. He is buried at All Saints Church at Tilford in Surrey.

== Family ==
In 1942 he married Philippa Hewlett at Honiton where they had one son and one daughter.

Military offices
Preceded by Philip Sharp	Flag Officer Sea Training; 1967–1969	Succeeded by Anthony Troup
Preceded by Sir Charles Mills (As Commander-in-Chief, Plymouth)	Flag Officer, Plymouth; July 1969 – September 1969	Succeeded by Sir Anthony Griffin
Preceded by Sir Michael Pollock	Flag Officer Submarines; 1969–1972	Succeeded by Anthony Troup
