= Peter Berger (Royal Navy officer) =

Royal Navy Vice-Admiral (1925–2003)

Vice-Admiral Sir Peter Berger KCB LVO DSC
- Born: 11 February 1925
- Died: 19 October 2003 (aged 78)
- Military career
- Allegiance: United Kingdom
- Branch: Royal Navy
- Service years: 1943–1981
- Rank: Vice-Admiral
- Commands: Flag Officer Plymouth and Port Admiral, Devonport; HMNB Clyde; HMS Phoebe; HMS Torquay
- Conflicts: Second World War
- Awards: Knight Commander of the Order of the Bath; Lieutenant of the Royal Victorian Order; Distinguished Service Cross

Vice-Admiral Sir Peter Egerton Capel Berger, KCB, LVO, DSC (11 February 1925 – 19 October 2003) was a Royal Navy officer who served as Flag Officer Plymouth from 1979 to 1981.

== Naval career ==
Educated at Harrow School, Berger joined the Royal Navy in 1943 and served in the Second World War, taking part in the Normandy landings while serving in the cruiser HMS Ajax. He also took part in the Yangtse Incident while serving as Navigating Officer aboard HMS Amethyst in 1949 and was seriously wounded in the incident. After serving as Fleet Navigating Officer, Home Fleet and then Navigating Officer on the Royal yacht HMS Britannia, he was appointed Commanding Officer of the frigate HMS Torquay in 1962, Defence attaché at The Hague in 1964 and Commanding Officer of the frigate HMS Phoebe in 1966. He went on to be Commodore on the River Clyde in 1971, Assistant Chief of the Naval Staff (Policy) in 1973 and Chief of Staff to the Commander-in-Chief Fleet in 1976. His last appointment was as Flag Officer Plymouth and Port Admiral, Devonport in 1979 before retiring in 1981.

In retirement Berger became bursar of Selwyn College, Cambridge.

== Family ==
In 1956 Berger married June Kathleen Pigou; they had three daughters.

Military offices
Preceded by Sir John Forbes	Flag Officer, Plymouth; 1979–1981	Succeeded by Sir Simon Cassels
