= HMS Cleopatra (F28) =

1966 Type 12I or Leander-class frigate of the Royal Navy

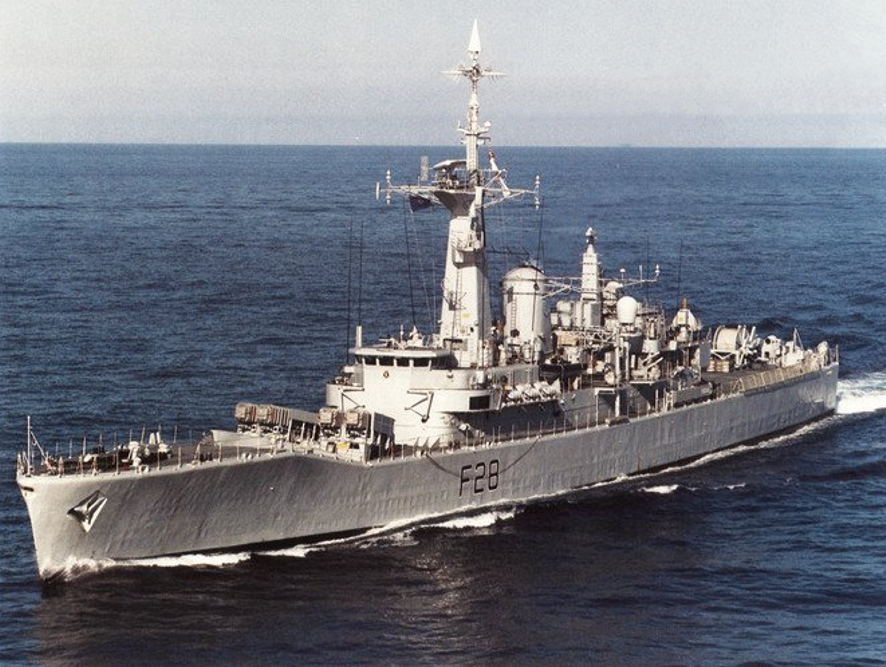
- Cleopatra in 1991, after conversion to towed array configuration

History

United Kingdom
- Name: HMS Cleopatra (F28)
- Operator: Royal Navy
- Builder: HMNB Devonport
- Laid down: 19 June 1963
- Launched: 21 March 1964
- Commissioned: 1 March 1966
- Decommissioned: 31 January 1992
- Home port: Devonport
- Nickname(s): Cleo
- Fate: Sold for scrap 1993

General characteristics
- Class & type: Leander-class frigate

HMS Cleopatra (F28) was a Leander-class frigate of the Royal Navy (RN). Cleopatra was built at HMNB Devonport. She was launched on 21 March 1964, commissioned on 1 March 1966 and decommissioned on 31 January 1992.

== Construction ==
Cleopatra was ordered during 1962 as the 10th ship of the Leander-class. The ship was laid down at Devonport Dockyard on 19 June 1963, was launched on 21 March 1964 and completed on 4 January 1966. She commissioned with the Pennant number F28 and International Callsign 'GMLU' on 1 March 1966.

Cleopatra was 372 feet (113.4 m) long overall and 360 feet (109.7 m) at the waterline, with a beam of 41 feet (12.5 m) and a maximum draught of 18 feet (5.5 m). Displacement was 2,380 long tons (2,420 t) standard and 2,860 long tons (2,910 t) full load. The ship was fitted with Y-100 machinery, built by Cammell Laird. Two oil-fired Babcock & Wilcox boilers fed steam at 550 pounds per square inch (3,800 kPa) and 850 °F (454 °C) to a pair of double reduction geared steam turbines that in turn drove two propeller shafts, with the machinery rated at 30,000 shaft horsepower (22,000 kW), giving a speed of 28 knots (52 km/h; 32 mph).

A twin 4.5-inch (113 mm) Mark 6 gun mount was fitted forward. Anti-aircraft defence was provided by a quadruple Sea Cat surface-to-air missile launcher on the hangar roof, while two Oerlikon 20 mm cannon for close-in defence against surface targets. A Limbo anti-submarine mortar was fitted aft to provide a short-range anti-submarine capability, while a hangar and helicopter deck allowed a single Westland Wasp helicopter to be operated, for longer range anti-submarine and anti-surface operations.

As built, Cleopatra was fitted with a large Type 965 long range air search radar on the ship's mainmast, with a Type 993 short range air/surface target indicating radar and Type 974 navigation radar carried on the ship's foremast. An MRS3 fire control system was carried over the ship's bridge to direct the 4.5-inch guns, while a GWS22 director for Seacat was mounted on the hangar roof. The ship had a sonar suite of Type 177 medium range search sonar, Type 162 bottom search and Type 170 attack sonar, together with a Type 199 variable depth sonar (VDS).

== Operational Service ==
Upon Cleopatra's commissioning, she was deployed to the Far East Fleet, joining the 2nd Destroyer Squadron, then returned Britain in 1967 where she served as a training ship at Portland for several months before returning to the Far East. Duties included participation in the Beira Patrol, which was designed to prevent oil reaching the landlocked Rhodesia via Lorenzo Marques (now Maputo) in the then Portuguese colony of Mozambique.

In 1969, Cleopatra was present at the Evans-Melbourne collision.

Cleopatra was refitted at Devonport from May to September 1970.

Following work up at Portland in 1971, she visited the West Indies and USA with HMS Ark Royal and RFAs OLMEDA and REGENT. In August 1971 CLEOPATRA deployed to the Far East via South Africa and joined the Singapore-based ANZUK force in December.

In February/March 1972, Cleopatra took part in escort duties during the Queen and the Duke of Edinburgh's South East Asia tour.

In 1972, on passage from Singapore to undertake Beira Patrol, HMS Cleopatra's helicopter crash landed into the sea. The helo was hoisted and secured on the ship's starboard side, taken to RAF Gan in the Maldives, and loaded on to a raft before transport to UK by the RAF. Cleopatra relieved HMS Lowestoft on Beira Patrol and 'borrowed' her Wasp helicopter for the remainder of her deployment.

In 1973, Cleopatra was dispatched to protect British trawlers against the Icelandic Coast Guard in the Second Cod War.

In May 1973 Cleopatra began a major modernisation at Devonport, becoming the first Leander-class ship to undergo the Batch 2 conversion. The conversion included the removal and replacement of all the ship's armament. The Mark 6 4.5-in gun mount was replaced by four Exocet anti-ship missiles. The Limbo anti-submarine mortar was removed to give a larger flight deck and the ship's hangar was enlarged to allow a Westland Lynx helicopter to be operated, while two triple STWS torpedo tubes provided short range anti-submarine capability. Anti-aircraft armament consisted of one Seacat launcher mounted forward of the Exocet containers and two more mounted aft on the hangar roof, backed up by two Bofors 40 mm anti-aircraft guns on the bridge wings. Type 1006 navigation radar replaced the old Type 974 radar, while the MRS3 gun control director as replaced by a GWS22 director for the forward Seacat launcher, with a second Seacat director mounted aft. Type 184M sonar replaced the main hull sonar, while the VDS was removed and its well plated over. Displacement rose to 2,700 long tons (2,700 t) standard and 3,200 long tons (3,300 t), with speed falling by two knots.

Cleopatra recommissioned after her reconstruction in late 1975 (Note: Osborne and Sowdon say that she was recommissioned on Trafalgar Day (i.e. 21 October) while Critchley and Jane's Fighting Ships say she was recommissioned on 28 November. Hansard states that Cleopatra's refit was completed on 19 December 1975.) and joined the 4th Frigate Squadron as leader. In 1977, Cleopatra, like many other Leanders, took part in the Fleet Review of the RN in celebration of HM the Queen's Silver Jubilee. Cleopatra was positioned in the middle of HM ships Zulu and Arethusa. She also visited Salalah, Muscat, and Basra that year.

The National Archives records that the Ministry of Defence has a file of details of intelligence collection by Cleopatra in January to March 1978. She was refitted again at Devonport in 1978. In 1981, Cleopatra deployed to the Mediterranean, which still had a large RN presence at the time.

In 1982 Cleopatra returned to Devonport to be converted to carry the new Type 1031 towed array sonar. (Note: It was originally intended to fit the towed array to four Rothesay-class frigates, but delays caused by industrial action resulted in plans being changed so that the Leander-class frigates Cleopatra, Phoebe, Sirius and Argonaut were converted instead) To accommodate the new sonar changes were made to reduce topweight. The forward Seacat launcher and director was removed, as was the long-range Type 965 radar, allowing the ship's mainmast to be replaced by a smaller mast. The Bofors guns were replaced by lighter Oerlikon 20 mm guns while the ship's boats were removed and the Exocet launchers and torpedo tubes lowered. A large cable reel was fitted to the aft end of the flight deck, while the Type 2031 I towed array sonar consisted of an acoustic array of passive hydrophones which were towed on the end of a 1,000–1,500 metres (1,100–1,600 yd) cable. The electronics needed to extract and display the sonar data was installed in the ship's hangar, which meant that Cleopatra was no longer able to operate a helicopter. (Note: Later towed-array conversions of Leanders had the cable reel moved to a sponson on the starboard quarter of the ship, while the electronics were moved to the redundant forward Seacat magazine, so that a helicopter could be operated.) Cleopatra completed her refit on 10 June 1983, the first Leander-class frigate to be fitted with a towed array.

The ship visited America in January–March 1984, and in 1985 was leader of the 7th Frigate Squadron. Further duties were undertaken but by the late 1980s, Cleopatra's age was beginning to show and her time was coming to an end. On 31 January 1992, Cleopatra was decommissioned. The following year, Cleopatra was sold for scrap.

== Commanding officers ==
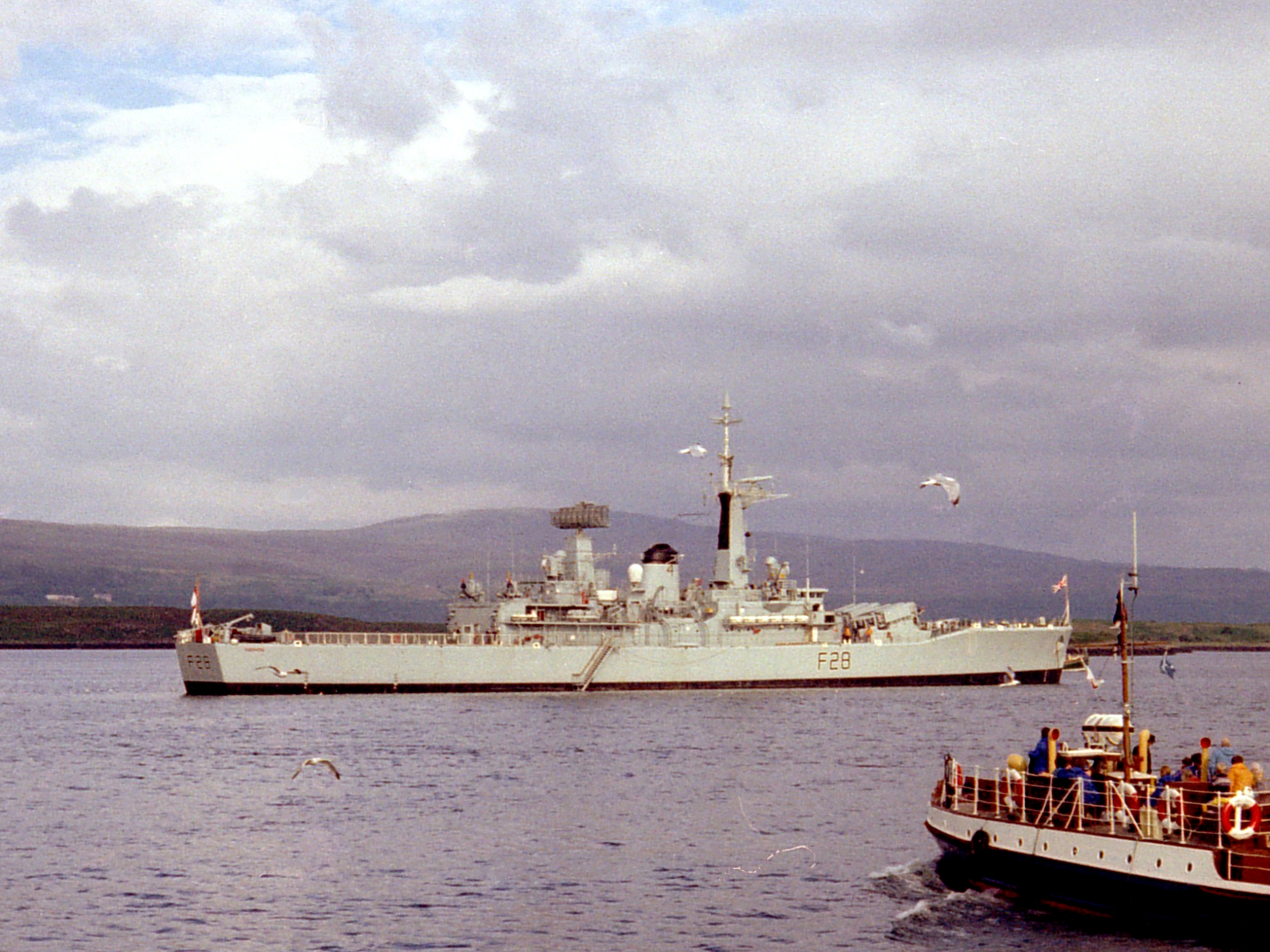
HMS Cleopatra at Tobermory, Mull, (1978).

Notable commanding officers include J M Webster (1977-1978), PK Haddacks (1981-1982), R T Newman (1984-1985) and James Rupert Fanshawe (1990-1992).

== Bibliography ==
- Colledge, J. J.; Warlow, Ben (2006) [1969]. Ships of the Royal Navy: The Complete Record of All Fighting Ships of the Royal Navy from the 15th Century to the Present (3rd Rev ed.). London: Chatham Publishing. ISBN 978-1-86176-281-8. OCLC 67375475.
- Critchley, Mike (1992). British Warships Since 1945: Part 5: Frigates. Liskeard, UK: Maritime Press. ISBN 0-907771-13-0.
- Friedman, Norman (2008). British Destroyers & Frigates: The Second World War and After. Barnsley, UK: Seaforth Publishing. ISBN 978-1-84832-015-4.
- Marriott, Leo (1983). Royal Navy Frigates 1945–1983. Shepperton, Surrey, UK: Ian Allan Ltd. ISBN 0-7110-1322-5.
- Moore, John, ed. (1979). Jane's Fighting Ships 1979–1980. London: Jane's Yearbooks. ISBN 0-354-00587-1.
- Moore, John, ed. (1985). Jane's Fighting Ships 1985–1986. London: Jane's Yearbooks. ISBN 0-7106-0814-4.
- Osborne, Richard; Sowdon, David (1990). Leander Class Frigates. Kendal, UK: World Ships Society. ISBN 0-905617-56-8.
- Sturtivant, Ray; Ballance, Theo (1994). The Squadrons of the Fleet Air Arm. Tonbridge, Kent, UK: Air Britain (Historians). ISBN 0-85130-223-8.
