= Richard Fitch =

Royal Navy Admiral (1929–1994)

Admiral Sir Richard Fitch KCB
- Born: 2 June 1929; Blackheath, London
- Died: 15 February 1994 (aged 64)
- Military career
- Allegiance: United Kingdom
- Branch: Royal Navy
- Service years: 1942–1988
- Rank: Admiral
- Nickname: Dick
- Commands: Flag Officer Third Flotilla; HMS Hermes; HMS Apollo; HMS Berwick
- Conflicts: Second World War
- Awards: Knight Commander of the Order of the Bath

Admiral Sir Richard George Alison Fitch, KCB (2 June 1929 – 15 February 1994) was a senior Royal Navy officer who served as Second Sea Lord and Chief of Naval Personnel from 1986 to 1988.

== Naval career ==
Educated at Royal Naval College Dartmouth, Fitch joined the Royal Navy as a cadet in 1942.

Fitch was made commanding officer of the frigate HMS Berwick in 1966 and then joined the staff of the Flag Officer Second-in-Command for the Far East Fleet in 1967. He was made commander of the frigate HMS Apollo in 1973 and then became Naval Assistant to the First Sea Lord in 1974.

Fitch was made captain of the aircraft carrier HMS Hermes in 1976 and Director of Naval Warfare at the Ministry of Defence in 1978. He went on to be Naval Secretary in 1980 and Flag Officer Third Flotilla in 1983. He was made Second Sea Lord and Chief of Naval Personnel as well as President of the Royal Naval College, Greenwich in 1986, and retired from the navy in November 1988.

In retirement Fitch became a Lloyd's name. Facing large underwriting losses, he committed suicide by carbon monoxide poisoning in his car.

== Family ==
In 1969 Fitch married Kathleen Marie-Louise Igert; they went on to have one son.

Military offices
Preceded by Paul Greening	Naval Secretary; 1980–1983	Succeeded by Richard Thomas
Preceded by Sir Simon Cassels	Second Sea Lord; 1986–1988	Succeeded by Sir Brian Brown
