= John Morrison Forbes =

Royal Navy Vice-Admiral (1925–2021)

Vice-Admiral Sir John Forbes KCB
- Born: 16 August 1925
- Died: 24 October 2021 (aged 96)
- Military career
- Allegiance: United Kingdom
- Branch: Royal Navy
- Rank: Vice-Admiral
- Commands: HMS Triumph
- Awards: Knight Commander of the Order of the Bath

Vice-Admiral Sir John Morrison Forbes KCB (16 August 1925 – 24 October 2021) was a British Royal Navy officer who became Naval Secretary.

== Naval career ==
Forbes attended Rockport School in Holywood, County Down and the Royal Naval College, Dartmouth. He was appointed Second-in-Command and Operational Commander of the Royal Malaysian Navy in 1966.

Forbes joined the Directorate of Naval Plans at the Ministry of Defence in 1969 and then became Captain of the aircraft carrier HMS Triumph in 1971 and Captain of the Royal Naval College, Dartmouth in 1972. Promoted to rear admiral he became Naval Secretary in 1974 and, following his promotion to vice admiral on 9 February 1977, he became Flag Officer, Plymouth and Admiral Superintendent at Devonport. He retired in 1979.

In retirement he became Chairman of the Civil Service Commissioners Interview Panel.

== Personal life ==
In 1950 he married Joyce Hadden; they have two sons and two daughters.

He died on 24 October 2021, at the age of 96.

Military offices
Preceded by Gordon Tait	Naval Secretary; 1974–1976	Succeeded by Peter Buchanan
Preceded by Sir Gordon Tait	Flag Officer, Plymouth; 1977–1979	Succeeded by Sir Peter Berger
