= Michael Pollock (Royal Navy officer) =

Royal Navy Admiral of the Fleet (1916–2006)

Admiral of the Fleet Sir Michael Pollock GCB LVO DSC
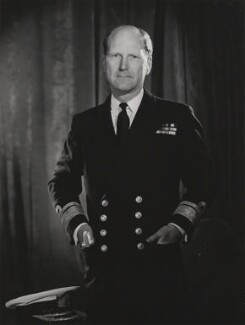
- Admiral Sir Michael Pollock
- Born: 19 October 1916; Altrincham, Cheshire
- Died: 27 September 2006 (aged 89); Martock, Somerset
- Military career
- Allegiance: United Kingdom
- Branch: Royal Navy
- Service years: 1930–1974
- Rank: Admiral of the Fleet
- Commands: First Sea Lord; HMS Ark Royal; HMS Vigo
- Conflicts: Second World War; Korean War; Malayan Emergency; Second Cod War
- Awards: Knight Grand Cross of the Order of the Bath; Lieutenant of the Royal Victorian Order; Distinguished Service Cross; Mentioned in Despatches (3)

Admiral of the Fleet Sir Michael Patrick Pollock, GCB, LVO, DSC (19 October 1916 – 27 September 2006) was a senior officer in the Royal Navy who rose to become First Sea Lord and Chief of the Naval Staff in the early 1970s. In the Second World War, he was an officer on ships tasked with protecting convoys in the Atlantic and the Mediterranean, and was gunnery officer on the cruiser HMS Norfolk when she fought the German battleship Scharnhorst during the Battle of North Cape. He later commanded the aircraft carrier HMS Ark Royal, and hosted Ian Smith on HMS Tiger. In retirement, he held the position of King of Arms of the Order of the Bath and Gloucester King of Arms, with responsibility for heraldry in Wales.

== Early career ==
Born the son of Charles Albert Pollock and Gladys Pollock (née Mason), Pollock was educated at the Royal Naval College, Dartmouth. He joined the Royal Navy as a cadet in 1930, and was posted to the training cruiser HMS Frobisher in January 1934, receiving promotion to midshipman on 1 September 1934, on transfer to the battleship HMS Nelson, flagship of the Home Fleet. He was deployed to the Mediterranean in the destroyer HMS Express in September 1935 and saw service with her during the Abyssinian crisis. He was promoted sub-lieutenant on 1 May 1937, and appointed to the cruiser HMS York, flagship of the America and West Indies Station in October 1937 and, after promotion to lieutenant on 1 August 1938, he transferred to the battleship HMS Warspite, based in Malta in June 1939.

== Second World War ==
Pollock served in the Second World War, becoming first lieutenant of the old destroyer HMS Vanessa in October 1939, escorting shipping across the English Channel to supply the British Expeditionary Force in northern France, and protecting convoys in the eastern Atlantic Ocean. His ship was badly damaged by German aircraft off Dover in July 1940.

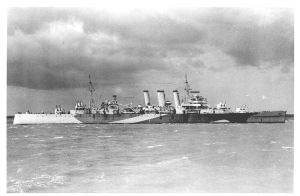
The heavy cruiser HMS Norfolk in which Pollock served as gunnery officer during the Second World War

Pollock joined the shore establishment HMS Excellent to train as a gunnery specialist in January 1941, and, having qualified, became a gunnery instructor there, but was then appointed gunnery officer on the light cruiser HMS Arethusa in Alexandria, where he was involved in the struggle to get supplies to Malta. On 18 November 1942, taking part in Operation Stoneage, the mission which effectively relieved the siege of Malta, Arethusa was hit by a torpedo bomber. A fuel tank caught fire, and over a quarter of the crew were killed. Despite severe damage and a rising gale, the ship was towed 450 miles back to Alexandria for repairs. Pollock was mentioned in despatches for his actions.

Pollock was appointed gunnery officer on the heavy cruiser HMS Norfolk in October 1943, tasked with protecting convoys to and from north Russia. Alerted by Enigma intercepts decoded at Bletchley Park, and assisted by radar, his ship and fellow cruisers HMS Belfast and HMS Sheffield twice intercepted Scharnhorst and its six accompanying destroyers when they attempted to attack two Arctic convoys (JW 55B travelling to and RA 55A travelling from Murmansk) in late December 1943. The 8-inch guns of Norfolk recorded two hits on Scharnhorst, but Norfolk was damaged by return fire from Scharnhorst's 11-inch guns on 26 December. Pollock was awarded the Distinguished Service Cross (DSC) for his actions. Scharnhorst was attacked by the battleship HMS Duke of York later that day and sunk, in the Royal Navy's last battleship action.

He remained with Norfolk while she was repaired on the Tyne, and so missed D-Day, and was involved in further action off the coast of Norway. He was on Norfolk, visiting Malta en route to the Far East, when the Japanese surrendered on 15 August 1945. In addition to the DSC, Pollock was mentioned in dispatches on two further occasions for his actions on Norfolk.

== Post-war naval career ==
After the war, Pollock was involved in actions by Norfolk to provide gunfire support against insurgents in the Malayan Emergency and also in Java. He returned to HMS Excellent as a gunnery instructor in January 1946 and, having been promoted to lieutenant commander on 1 June 1946, became an application officer at the Admiralty Signals Research Establishment in August 1947. He became Fleet Gunnery Officer to the Commander-in-Chief, America and West Indies Station in October 1949. Promoted to commander on 30 June 1950, he became Commander (G) at the Chatham Gunnery School in November 1950 and helped organise the funeral of King George VI, at which he was second-in-command of the naval contingent, in February 1952; it was in recognition of this that he was subsequently appointed a Lieutenant of the Royal Victorian Order. He became Commander of the Junior Officers' War Course at the Royal Naval College, Greenwich, in September 1952 and second-in-command of the light cruiser HMS Newcastle, the flagship of the Far East Fleet, in June 1954. In Newcastle he saw action in the Korean War and then in the Malayan Emergency.

Promoted to captain on 30 June 1955, he became Assistant Director of Plans (Warfare) at the Admiralty in January 1956 and then became as Captain (D) at Portsmouth as well as Commanding Officer of the destroyer HMS Vigo in February 1958. After a tour as Director, Surface Weapons at the Admiralty's shore establishment at Bath commencing in January 1960, he was considered for command of the cruiser HMS Blake, but instead was given command of the aircraft carrier HMS Ark Royal in January 1963. At this time HMS Ark Royal was carrying out the first trials of the Hawker P. 1127 which subsequently developed into the Hawker Siddeley Harrier. He became Assistant Chief of Naval Staff in March 1964, with promotion to rear admiral on 7 July 1964, in the lead up to a defence review by the Labour government which resulted in the 1966 Defence White Paper. He was appointed Companion of the Order of the Bath in the 1966 Birthday Honours.

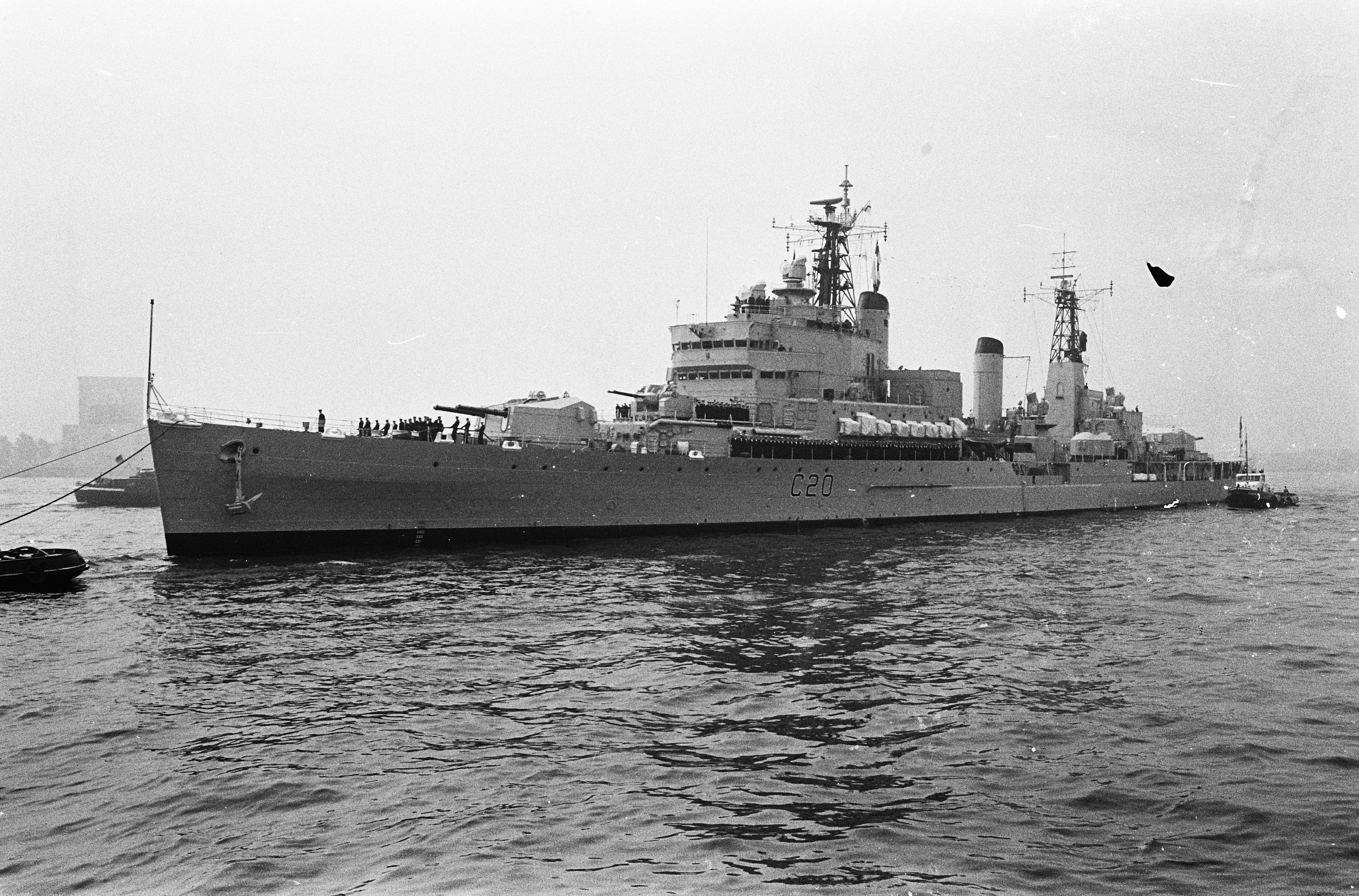
The cruiser HMS Tiger, Pollock's flagship as second-in-command of the Home Fleet and the location for talks between Harold Wilson and Ian Smith

Pollock became second-in-command of the Home Fleet in May 1966 with his flag in the cruiser HMS Tiger. HMS Tiger became the location for the "Tiger talks" between Prime Minister Harold Wilson and the UDI inclined premier Ian Smith about the future of Rhodesia. He led the Royal Navy delegations to the Royal Canadian Navy's centennial celebration of Canadian Confederation at Halifax, Nova Scotia in 1967, and to Expo 67 in Montreal, Quebec. He was promoted vice-admiral on 26 December 1967 on appointment as Flag Officer Submarines and NATO Commander Submarines in the Eastern Atlantic. He was in this post when the first Polaris missile was tested and the Faslane submarine base was developed. Advanced to Knight Commander of the Order of the Bath in the 1969 Birthday Honours, he became Third Sea Lord and Controller of the Navy in January 1970 and received promotion to full admiral on 21 April 1970.

Admiral Sir Michael Le Fanu, the Chief of the Defence Staff-designate, retired suddenly due to ill health in late 1970. The new First Sea Lord, Admiral Sir Peter Hill-Norton, was promoted in Le Fanu's place, and Pollock, having been advanced to Knight Grand Cross of the Order of the Bath in the 1971 New Year Honours, was suddenly invited to replace Hill-Norton as First Sea Lord and Chief of the Naval Staff in March 1971. During Pollock's term as First Sea Lord, the Navy was involved in the "Cod War" with Iceland in 1972, the 1973 oil crisis and deep cuts in defence expenditure. He was also involved in the decisions that led to the creation of the "through deck cruiser", which became the small Invincible-class aircraft carriers. Pollock was First and Principal Naval Aide de camp to the Queen from August 1972 to March 1974. Promoted to Admiral of the Fleet on 1 March 1974, he retired that month.

== Later life ==
In retirement Pollock was Chairman of the Naval Insurance Trust from 1975 to 1985. He was also King of Arms of the Order of the Bath and Gloucester King of Arms, with responsibility for heraldry in Wales from 1976 to 1985. After he left the Navy, he lived in Churchstoke in Powys. His interests included walking, shooting, fishing and local affairs in Powys. He died in Martock in Somerset on 27 September 2006.

== Family ==
Pollock married Margaret (Peg) Steacy in 1940, and they had two sons and a daughter. His first wife died in 1951. He remarried in 1954, to Marjory (Midge) Reece (née Bisset), acquiring a stepdaughter. His second wife died in 2001. One of his sons became a lieutenant-commander in the Navy and his grandson, Barney Pollock, who also joined the Navy, passed out at Dartmouth in December 2004 with the Commandant Talbot prize for leadership and the Queen's Sword.

== Sources ==
- Heathcote, Tony (2002). The British Admirals of the Fleet 1734–1995. Pen & Sword Ltd. ISBN 0-85052-835-6.

Military offices
Preceded by Ian McGeoch	Flag Officer Submarines; 1967–1969	Succeeded by Sir John Roxburgh
Preceded by Sir Horace Law	Controller of the Navy; 1970–1971	Succeeded by Sir Anthony Griffin
Preceded by Sir Peter Hill-Norton	First Sea Lord; 1971–1974	Succeeded by Sir Edward Ashmore
Honorary titles
Preceded by Sir Horace Law	First and Principal Naval Aide-de-Camp; 1972–1974	Held thereafter by the First Sea Lord
Heraldic offices
Preceded by Sir Richard Goodbody	King of Arms of the Order of the Bath; 1976–1985	Succeeded by Sir David Evans
