= Robert Gerken =

Royal Navy admiral (1932–2022)

Vice-Admiral Sir Robert Gerken KCB CBE
- Born: 11 June 1932; London, England
- Died: 20 December 2022 (aged 90)
- Military career
- Allegiance: United Kingdom
- Branch: Royal Navy
- Service years: 1948 – 1987
- Rank: Vice-Admiral
- Commands: 6th Frigate Squadron; Flag Officer 2nd Flotilla; Director-General, Naval Manpower and Training; Flag Officer Plymouth and Port Admiral, Devonport
- Awards: Knight Commander of the Order of the Bath; Commander of the Order of the British Empire

Vice-Admiral Sir Robert William Frank Gerken KCB CBE (11 June 1932 – 20 December 2022) was a British Royal Navy officer who served as Flag Officer, Plymouth.

== Early life ==
Robert William Frank Gerken was born on 11 June 1932 in London. He was educated at Chigwell School.

== Naval career ==
After attending the Royal Naval College, Dartmouth and the Royal Naval College, Greenwich, Gerken joined the Royal Navy in 1948. He became Commanding Officer of the frigate HMS Andromeda as well as Captain of the 6th Frigate Squadron in 1974. He went on to become Captain of the Fleet in 1978, Flag Officer, Second Flotilla in 1981 with promotion to rear-admiral from 7 July 1981, and Director-General, Naval Manpower and Training in 1983. Promoted to vice-admiral on 15 November 1984, his last appointment was as Flag Officer Plymouth and Port Admiral, HMNB Devonport in 1985 before he retired in April 1987.

In retirement he became Chairman of Plymouth Development Corporation.

== Personal life and death ==
In 1966, he married Christine Stephenson; they had two daughters. Following the death of his first wife he married Ann Fermor (née Blythe) in 1983.

Gerken died on 20 December 2022, at the age of 90.

Military offices
Preceded by Sir David Brown	Flag Officer, Plymouth; 1985–1987	Succeeded by Sir John Webster
