= Roy Newman =

Vice Admiral Sir Roy Newman KCB DL
- Born: 8 September 1936 (age 90)
- Military career
- Allegiance: United Kingdom
- Branch: Royal Navy
- Service years: 1954–1996
- Rank: Vice-admiral
- Commands: Flag Officer, Plymouth; 7th Frigate Squadron; HMS Cleopatra; HMS Dolphin; HMS Naiad
- Conflicts: Gulf War
- Awards: Knight Commander of the Order of the Bath

Vice-admiral Sir Roy Thomas Newman, KCB, DL (born 8 September 1936) is a former Royal Navy officer who became Flag Officer, Plymouth.

== Naval career ==
Educated at Queen Elizabeth's Grammar School in Barnet, Newman joined the Royal Navy in 1954. He was promoted to captain on 30 June 1979, and became Commanding Officer of the frigate HMS Naiad before taking over the submarine school HMS Dolphin in 1981. He became the Commanding Officer of the frigate HMS Cleopatra as well as Captain of the 7th Frigate Squadron and was involved in the evacuation of British troops from Lebanon in 1984. He was appointed Director of Naval Warfare at the Ministry of Defence in 1986, Flag Officer Sea Training in 1988 and Deputy Commander-in-Chief Fleet in 1990. After serving as Naval Deputy to the Joint Commander for Operation Granby in 1991, he was appointed Flag Officer, Plymouth and Admiral Superintendent at Devonport in 1992, before retiring in 1996.

In retirement Newman became Deputy Lieutenant of Hampshire.

Military offices
Preceded by John Coward	Flag Officer Sea Training; 1988–1989	Succeeded by Bruce Richardson
New office	Deputy Commander-in-Chief Fleet; 1990–1992	Succeeded by Sir Geoffrey Biggs
Preceded by Sir Alan Grose	Flag Officer, Plymouth; 1992–1996	Post disbanded
