= David Brown (Royal Navy officer) =

Vice-Admiral Sir David Brown KCB
- Born: 28 November 1927; London, England
- Died: 13 July 2005 (aged 77)
- Military career
- Allegiance: United Kingdom
- Branch: Royal Navy
- Service years: 1945–1985
- Rank: Vice-Admiral
- Commands: Flag Officer, Plymouth; HMS Bristol; HMS Hermione; HMS Falmouth; HMS Cavendish
- Conflicts: Second World War; Indonesia–Malaysia confrontation Falklands War
- Awards: Knight Commander of the Order of the Bath

Vice-Admiral Sir David Worthington Brown, KCB (28 November 1927 – 13 July 2005) was a Royal Navy officer who served as Flag Officer, Plymouth.

== Naval career ==
Educated in HMS Conway, Brown joined the Royal Navy in June 1945. After commanding four minesweepers, he took over the destroyer HMS Cavendish, then successively the frigates HMS Falmouth and HMS Hermione and finally the destroyer HMS Bristol. He became He was appointed Director of Naval Operations and Trade under the Ministry of Defence Naval Staff in 1972, Director of Officer Appointments (Executive) in 1976 and Assistant Chief of the Defence Staff (Operations) in 1980. In this capacity he was responsible for briefing senior naval officers and Prime Minister Margaret Thatcher on the planning for the Falklands War. He went on to be Flag Officer, Plymouth and Admiral Superintendent at Devonport in 1982 before retiring in 1985.

In retirement he became a consultant to the insurance brokers, Hogg Group and Chairman of the Governors of Broadmoor Hospital.

== Family ==
In 1958 Brown married Etienne Hester Boileau; they had three daughters.

Military offices
Preceded by Sir Simon Cassels	Flag Officer, Plymouth; 1982–1985	Succeeded by Sir Robert Gerken
