= John Webster (Royal Navy officer) =

Royal Navy officer (1932–2020)

Vice-Admiral Sir John Webster KCB
- Born: 3 November 1932
- Died: 5 October 2020 (aged 87)
- Military career
- Allegiance: United Kingdom
- Branch: Royal Navy
- Service years: 1951–1990
- Rank: Vice-Admiral
- Commands: HMS Argonaut; HMS Cleopatra; Flag Officer Sea Training; Chief of Staff Fleet; Flag Officer Plymouth and Port Admiral, Devonport
- Awards: Knight Commander of the Order of the Bath

Vice-Admiral Sir John Morrison Webster KCB (3 November 1932 – 5 October 2020) was a Royal Navy officer who became Flag Officer Plymouth and Port Admiral, Devonport.

== Naval career ==
Educated at Pangbourne College, Webster joined the Royal Navy in 1951. He became commanding officer of the frigate HMS Argonaut in 1970, Liaison Officer in Ottawa in 1974 and commanding officer of the frigate HMS Cleopatra in 1977. He was appointed director of naval warfare at the Ministry of Defence in 1980, Flag Officer Sea Training in 1982 and chief of staff to the Commander-in-Chief Fleet in 1984. He went on to be Flag Officer Plymouth and Port Admiral, Devonport at HMNB Devonport in 1987, before retiring in June 1990.

In retirement he became a landscape and marine painter.

He died on 5 October 2020, at the age of 87.

== Family ==
In 1962, he married Valerie Anne "Val" Villiers, daughter of Admiral Sir Michael Villiers; they had one son, who predeceased him, and two daughters.

Military offices
Preceded by David Eckersley-Maslin	Flag Officer Sea Training; 1982–1984	Succeeded by Michael Livesay
Preceded by Sir Robert Gerken	Flag Officer, Plymouth; 1987–1990	Succeeded by Sir Alan Grose
