= Simon Cassels =

Royal Navy Admiral (1928–2019)

Admiral Sir Simon Cassels KCB CBE
- Born: 5 March 1928
- Died: 6 March 2019 (aged 91)
- Military career
- Allegiance: United Kingdom
- Branch: Royal Navy
- Service years: 1947–1986
- Rank: Admiral
- Commands: Flag Officer, Plymouth; HMS Fearless
- Conflicts: Korean War
- Awards: Knight Commander of the Order of the Bath; Commander of the Order of the British Empire

Admiral Sir Simon Alastair Cassillis Cassels, KCB, CBE (5 March 1928 – 6 March 2019) was a senior Royal Navy officer who served as Second Sea Lord and Chief of Naval Personnel from 1982 to 1986.

== Naval career ==
Cassels joined the Royal Navy in 1947. He was Navigation Staff Officer to Chief of the Polaris Executive from 1963 to 1966, and went on to command HMS Fearless in 1972.

Cassels became Assistant Chief of the Naval Staff (Operational Requirements) in 1978, and was promoted to vice-admiral on 18 November 1980. He was appointed Flag Officer, Plymouth and Admiral Superintendent at Devonport in 1981, and Second Sea Lord and Chief of Naval Personnel as well as President of the Royal Naval College, Greenwich in 1982. Promoted full admiral in November 1984, he retired in 1986.

Cassels was appointed a Commander of the Order of the British Empire (CBE) in the 1976 Birthday Honours, and a Knight Commander of the Order of the Bath (KCB) in the 1982 Birthday Honours.

== Later life ==
In retirement Cassels's activities included serving as Chairman of the Modern Apprentices Advisory Committee. He lived at Exton in Hampshire.

Cassels died on 6 March 2019, aged 91.

== Family ==
Cassels was married to Jill.

Military offices
Preceded by Sir Peter Berger	Flag Officer, Plymouth; 1981–1982	Succeeded by Sir David Brown
Preceded by Sir Desmond Cassidi	Second Sea Lord; 1982–1986	Succeeded by Sir Richard Fitch
