= Rae McKaig =

Royal Navy Admiral (1922–1996)

Admiral Sir Rae McKaig KCB CBE
- Born: 24 April 1922
- Died: 7 January 1996 (aged 73)
- Military career
- Allegiance: United Kingdom
- Branch: Royal Navy
- Service years: 1939–1976
- Rank: Admiral
- Commands: Flag Officer, Plymouth; HM Signal School
- Conflicts: Second World War
- Awards: Knight Commander of the Order of the Bath; Commander of the Order of the British Empire

Admiral Sir John Rae McKaig, KCB, CBE (24 April 1922 – 7 January 1996) was a Royal Navy officer who served as Flag Officer, Plymouth from 1970 to 1973.

== Naval career ==
Educated at Loretto School, McKaig joined the Royal Navy in 1939 and served in the Second World War. McKaig was made Deputy Chief of the Polaris Executive when it was established in 1963, and commanding officer of HM Signal School in 1966. He was appointed Assistant Chief of the Naval Staff (Operational Requirements) in 1968, Flag Officer, Plymouth and Admiral Superintendent at Devonport in 1970, and UK Military Representative to NATO in 1973 before retiring in 1976.

In retirement McKaig became a Director at Inchcape plc. He lived at Hambledon in Hampshire.

== Family ==
In 1945 McKaig married Barbara Dawn Marriott; they had two sons and one daughter.

Military offices
Preceded by Sir Anthony Griffin	Flag Officer, Plymouth; 1970–1973	Succeeded by Sir Arthur Power
Preceded by Sir Victor FitzGeorge-Balfour	UK Military Representative to NATO; 1973–1975	Succeeded by Sir David Fraser
