= Alan Grose =

Vice-Admiral Sir Alan Grose KBE
- Born: 24 September 1937 (age 89)
- Military career
- Allegiance: United Kingdom
- Branch: Royal Navy
- Service years: 1957–1992
- Rank: Vice Admiral
- Commands: HMS Eskimo; HMS Bristol; HMS Illustrious; Flag Officer, Plymouth
- Conflicts: Falklands War
- Awards: Knight Commander of the Order of the British Empire

Vice Admiral Sir Alan Grose KBE (born 24 September 1937) is a former Royal Navy officer who became Flag Officer, Plymouth.

== Naval career ==
Educated at Strode's School and the Royal Naval College, Dartmouth, Grose joined the Royal Navy in 1957. He became commanding officer of the frigate HMS Eskimo in 1974 and of the destroyer HMS Bristol in 1980 commanding the latter ship in the Falklands War. He commanded the aircraft carrier HMS Illustrious from 1984 until 1986, when he was succeeded by Captain Peter Woodhead. He was appointed Assistant Chief of Defence Staff (Operational Requirements) at the Ministry of Defence in 1986, Flag Officer Third Flotilla in 1988 and Flag Officer, Plymouth and Admiral Superintendent at Devonport in 1990 before retiring in 1992.

In retirement he became Head of Security for De Beers. He is also an Honorary Fellow of Liverpool John Moores University.

== Family ==
In 1961 he married Gillian Ann Dymond; they had two sons and one daughter.

Military offices
Preceded by Sir John Webster	Flag Officer, Plymouth; 1990–1992	Succeeded by Sir Roy Newman
