= Arthur Mackenzie Power =

Vice-Admiral Sir Arthur Power KCB MBE
- Born: 18 June 1921
- Died: 17 November 1984 (aged 63); Liphook, Hampshire, England
- Relatives: Admiral of the Fleet Sir Arthur Power (father)
- Military career
- Allegiance: United Kingdom
- Branch: Royal Navy
- Service years: 1938–1975
- Rank: Vice-Admiral
- Commands: Admiral Superintendent, Devonport; Flag Officer, Plymouth; Flag Officer, First Flotilla; Admiral Superintendent, Portsmouth
- Conflicts: Second World War
- Awards: Knight Commander of the Order of the Bath; Member of the Order of the British Empire

Vice-Admiral Sir Arthur Mackenzie Power, KCB, MBE (18 June 1921 – 17 November 1984) was a Royal Navy officer who served as Flag Officer, Plymouth from 1973 to 1975.

== Naval career ==
Born the son of Admiral of the Fleet Sir Arthur Power, Power joined the Royal Navy in 1938 and served in the Second World War. He was appointed commander of the 23rd Escort Squadron in 1963, and captain of the Gunnery School (HMS Excellent) in 1964. In 1965 he commanded the detachment of seamen (who were from HMS Excellent) who manned the Royal Navy State Funeral Gun Carriage that carried the coffin at Winston Churchill's funeral. In 1968 he became Admiral Superintendent, Portsmouth. He went on to be Flag Officer, First Flotilla in 1971, was promoted to vice admiral on 29 November 1971, and Flag Officer, Plymouth and Admiral Superintendent, Devonport in 1973 before retiring in 1975.

== Family ==
In 1949 Power married Marcia Helen Gell; they had two sons and one daughter.

Military offices
Preceded by Sir Rae McKaig	Flag Officer, Plymouth; 1973–1975	Succeeded by Sir Gordon Tait
