= Commander-in-Chief, Plymouth =

Former senior position in the Royal Navy

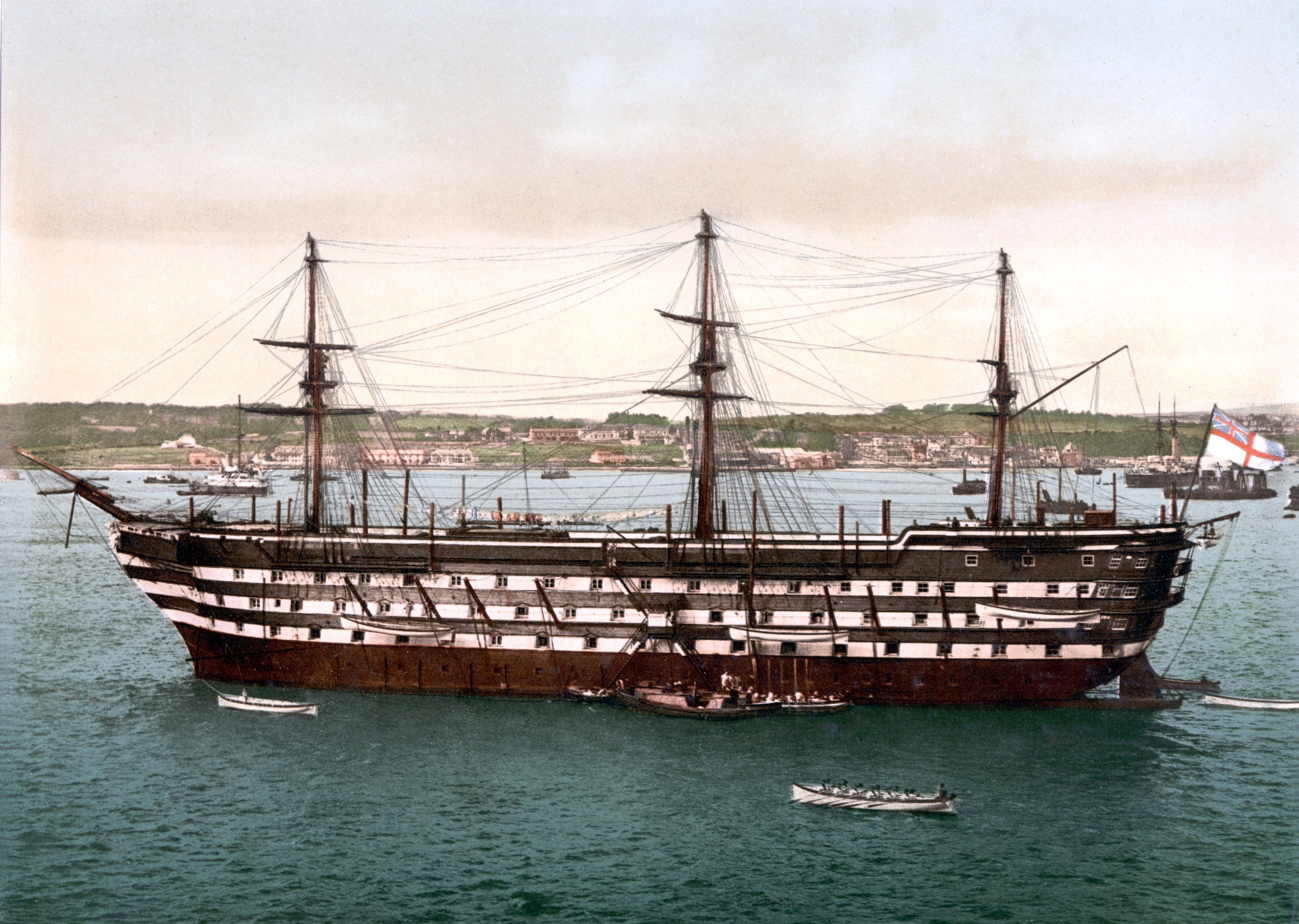
- HMS Impregnable, flagship of the Commander-in-Chief, Plymouth, circa 1900
- Active: 1743–1845, 1896-1969
- Country: United Kingdom
- Branch: Royal Navy
- Type: Fleet
- Garrison/HQ: Mount Wise, Plymouth

The Commander-in-Chief, Plymouth, was a senior commander of the Royal Navy for hundreds of years. Plymouth Command was a name given to the units, establishments, and staff operating under the admiral's command. Between 1845 and 1896, this office was renamed Commander-in-Chief, Devonport. The Commanders-in-Chief were based in what is now Hamoaze House, Devonport, Plymouth, from 1809 to 1934 and then at Admiralty House, Mount Wise, Devonport, from 1934 until 1996.

== History ==
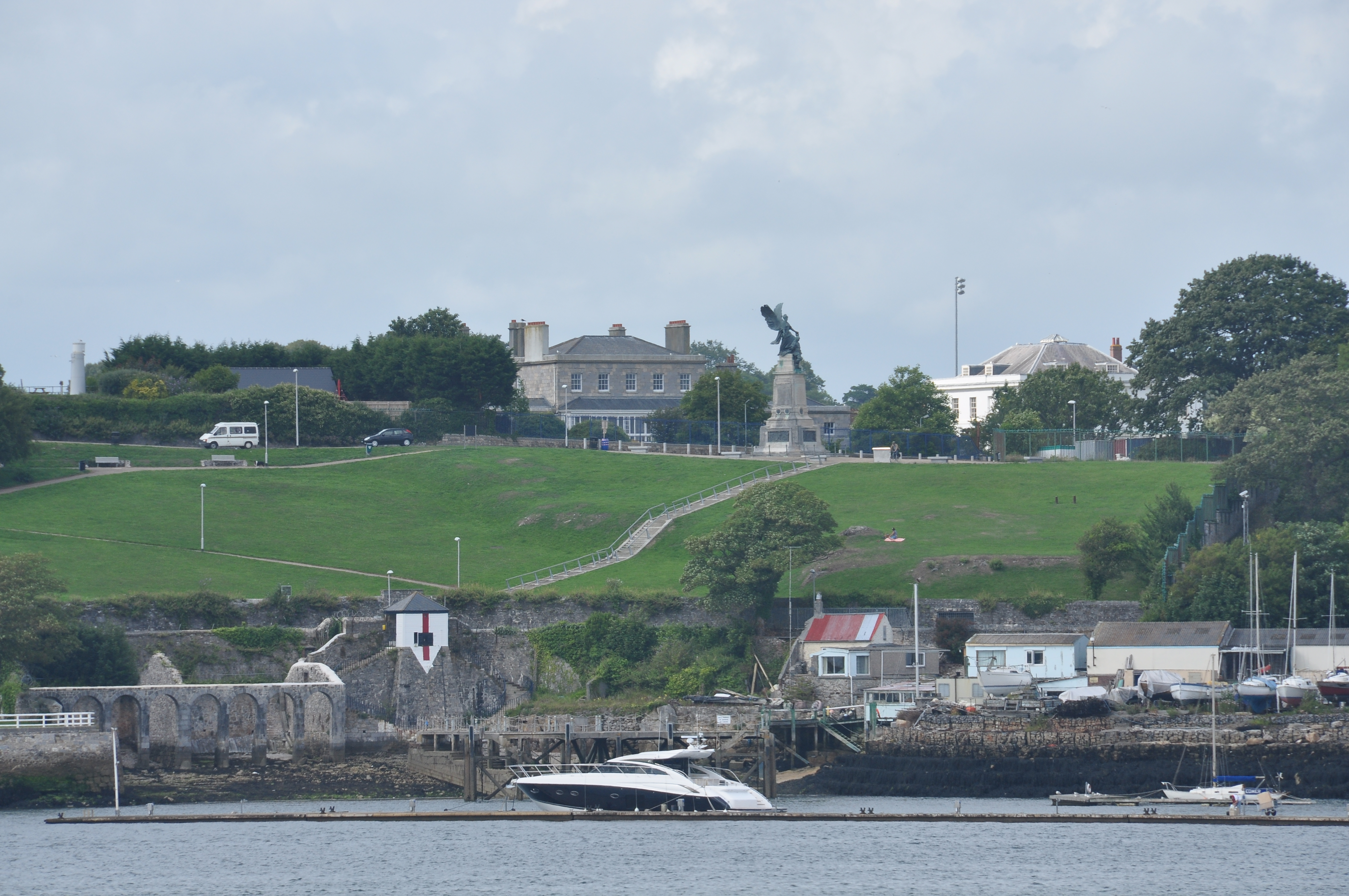
Hamoaze House, formerly Admiralty House, on Mount Wise (centre)

The post dates back to around 1743. It extended along the South Coast from Exmouth in East Devon to Penzance in Cornwall. In 1845, this office was renamed as Commander-in-Chief, Devonport, until 1896, when it was altered back to its original name. In 1941, during World War II, elements of Plymouth Command were transferred to Western Approaches Command which was established at Derby House in Liverpool. Meanwhile, Plymouth Command occupied a new combined Headquarters, known as the Maritime Headquarters, at Mount Wise. The post of Commander-in-Chief, Plymouth, was merged with that of Commander-in-Chief, Portsmouth, in 1969, to form Naval Home Command. Between 1952 and 1969, the Commander-in-Chief, Plymouth, double-hatted as Plymouth Sub-Area Channel Command (PLYMCHAN) commander in NATO's Allied Command Channel, and from 1969 to 1994, he double-hatted as Naval Base Commander Devonport, NATO Commander Central Sub-Area (CENTLANT) and Commander Plymouth Sub-Area Channel (PLYMCHAN).

After 1969, Admiralty House and the Maritime Headquarters became the home of the Flag Officer, Plymouth, until that post was also disbanded in 1996. At around the same time the nearby RN Dockyard and barracks were reconstituted as HM Naval Base Devonport and placed under the command of a Commodore.

== Office holders ==
Commanders-in-Chief and Flag Officers have included:
No = died in post

- Jul 1747 – Aug 1747 Rear-Admiral Edward Hawke
- Jun 1756 – Jul 1756 Captain George Brydges Rodney
- 1761 – 1763 Vice-Admiral Philip Durell
- Jan 1763 – Jun 1763 Vice-Admiral Lord Colville
- 1763 – 1766 Vice-Admiral Sir Thomas Pye
- 1766 – 1770 Vice-Admiral Sir George Edgcumbe
- 1771 – 1774 Rear-Admiral Sir Richard Spry
- 1774 – 1778 Vice-Admiral John Amherst No
- 1778 – 1783 Vice Admiral Sir Molyneux Shuldham
- 1783 – 1786 Vice Admiral Mark Milbanke
- 1786 – 1790 Vice-Admiral Sir Thomas Graves
- 1790 – 1792 Rear-Admiral Sir Richard Bickerton No
- 1792 – 1793 Rear-Admiral Phillips Cosby
- 1793 – 1794 Vice-Admiral Rowland Cotton No
- 1794 – 1796 Vice-Admiral Sir Richard King
- 1796 – 1799 Vice-Admiral Sir Richard Onslow
- 1799 – 1801 Vice-Admiral Sir Thomas Pasley
- 1802 – 1803 Vice-Admiral Sir James Dacres
- 1803 – 1804 Vice-Admiral Sir John Colpoys
- 1804 – 1810 Vice-Admiral Sir William Young
- 1810 – 1813 Admiral Sir Robert Calder
- 1813 – 1815 Vice-Admiral William Domett
- 1815 – 1817 Admiral Sir John Duckworth No
- 1817 – 1821 Admiral Viscount Exmouth
- 1821 – 1824 Admiral Sir Alexander Cochrane
- 1824 – 1827 Admiral Sir James Saumarez
- 1827 – 1830 Admiral Lord Northesk
- 1830 – 1833 Admiral Sir Manley Dixon
- 1833 – 1836 Admiral Sir William Hargood
- 1836 – 1839 Admiral Lord Amelius Beauclerk
- 1839 – 1842 Admiral Sir Graham Moore
- 1842 – 1845 Admiral Sir David Milne No

Office is renamed Commander-in-Chief, Devonport

- 1900 – 1902 Vice-Admiral Lord Charles Montagu Douglas Scott
- 1902 – 1908 Vice-Admiral Sir Lewis Beaumont
- 1908 – 1911 Vice-Admiral Sir Wilmot Fawkes
- 1911 – 1913 Vice-Admiral Sir William May
- 1913 – 1916 Vice-Admiral Sir George Egerton
- Mar 1916 – Dec 1916 Vice-Admiral Sir George Warrender
- 1916 – 1918 Admiral Sir Alexander Bethell
- 1918 – 1920 Vice-Admiral Sir Cecil Thursby
- 1920 – 1923 Admiral Sir Montague Browning
- 1923 – 1926 Vice-Admiral Sir Richard Phillimore
- 1926 – 1929 Vice-Admiral Sir Rudolph Bentinck
- 1929 – 1932 Vice-Admiral Sir Hubert Brand
- 1932 – 1935 Vice-Admiral Sir Eric Fullerton
- 1935 – 1938 Admiral Sir Reginald Drax
- 1938 – 1941 Admiral Sir Martin Dunbar-Nasmith
- 1941 – 1943 Admiral of the Fleet Sir Charles Forbes
- 1943 – 1945 Vice-Admiral Sir Ralph Leatham
- 1945 – 1947 Admiral Sir Henry Pridham-Wippell
- 1947 – 1950 Vice-Admiral Sir Robert Burnett
- 1950 – 1951 Vice-Admiral Sir Rhoderick McGrigor
- 1951 – 1953 Vice-Admiral Sir Maurice Mansergh
- 1953 – 1955 Vice-Admiral Sir Alexander Madden
- 1955 – 1958 Vice Admiral Sir Charles Pizey
- 1958 – 1961 Vice-Admiral Sir Richard Onslow
- 1961 – 1962 Vice-Admiral Sir Charles Madden
- 1962 – 1965 Vice-Admiral Sir Nigel Henderson
- 1965 – 1967 Vice-Admiral Sir Fitzroy Talbot
- 1967 – 1969 Vice-Admiral Sir Charles Mills

== Post 1969 period ==
On 30 December 1970, Vice-Admiral J R McKaig CBE was appointed as Port Admiral, Her Majesty's Naval Base, Devonport, and Flag Officer, Plymouth. On 5 September 1971, all Flag Officers of the Royal Navy holding positions of Admiral Superintendents at Royal Dockyards were restyled as Port Admirals.

== See also ==
- Commander-in-Chief, Devonport
- Flag Officer, Plymouth
- Port Admiral, Devonport
