= Charles Henry Cross =

Royal Navy Admiral; Admiral Superintendent of Devonport Dockyard (1852–1915)

Admiral Charles Henry Cross (18 May 1852 – 1 January 1915) was a Royal Navy officer. He was Admiral Superintendent, Devonport Dockyard from 1908 to 1910.
