= HMNB Devonport =

Operating base in the United Kingdom for the Royal Navy

HMNB Devonport
- Plymouth, Devon in England
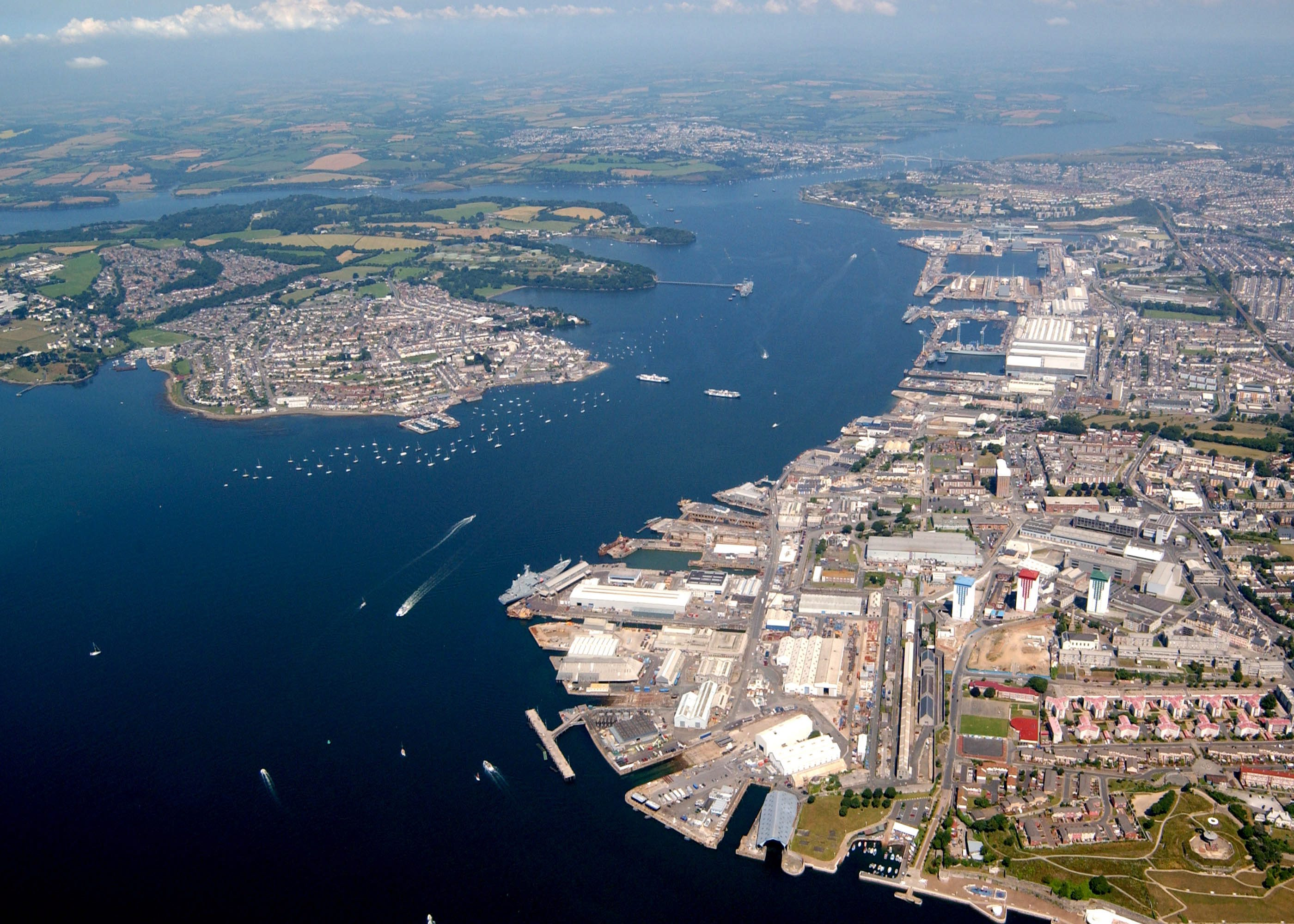
- Aerial view of HMNB Devonport: the South Yard (in the foreground) dates from 1692, since when the dockyard has expanded northwards (towards the top of the picture).

Site information
- Type: Naval base
- Owner: Ministry of Defence (Navy Command)
- Operator: Royal Navy
- Controlled by: Naval Base Commander, Devonport
- Condition: Operational
- Website: Official website

Location
- Location in Devon
- Coordinates: 50°23′06″N 4°11′06″W
- Area: 263 hectares (650 acres)

Site history
- Built: 1691
- In use: 1691 – present
- Events: Plymouth Blitz (1941)

His Majesty's Naval Base, Devonport (HMNB Devonport) is the largest naval base in Western Europe, and one of three operating bases in the United Kingdom for the Royal Navy. It is the sole nuclear repair and refuelling facility for the Royal Navy. HMNB Devonport is located in Devonport, in the west of the city of Plymouth, England.

The base began as a Royal Navy Dockyard in the late 17th century, designed and built on open ground by Edmund Dummer as an integrated facility for the repair and maintenance of warships, centred on his pioneering stone dry dock (one of the earliest stepped docks in the world). Over the next two centuries it expanded, reaching its present extent in the 20th century. Historically, the yard was also used for shipbuilding: over 300 naval vessels were built there, the last being HMS Scylla (launched in 1968).

The yard was known as HM Dockyard, Plymouth until 1843, when it was renamed HM Dockyard, Devonport. (In the late 20th century, here as elsewhere, the term 'Naval Base' replaced 'Dockyard' in the official naval designation.)

HMNB Devonport served as the home port of the Devonport Flotilla until it was merged into the Surface Flotilla. Commander Fleet Operational Sea Training, the training hub of the front-line Fleet, is also based there, as is the Royal Navy's Amphibious Centre of Excellence (at RM Tamar). Although shipbuilding ceased at Devonport in the late 1960s, ship repair and maintenance work has continued; the now privatised maintenance facilities are operated under the name Devonport Royal Dockyard by Babcock International Group, which took over the previous owner Devonport Management Limited (DML) in 2007 (DML had been running the Dockyard since privatisation in 1987). Babcock owns around a third of the overall area of the base (having been sold the freehold in 2011).

Accommodation and support services are provided within the base for naval personnel. The Royal Naval Barracks, dating from 1889, were first commissioned as HMS Vivid, before being renamed HMS Drake in 1934. Since the early 21st century the name HMS Drake (and its command structure) has been extended to cover the entire Naval Base, while HMS Vivid is Plymouth's Royal Naval Reserve unit (which has its headquarters within the base).

== The Naval Base today ==
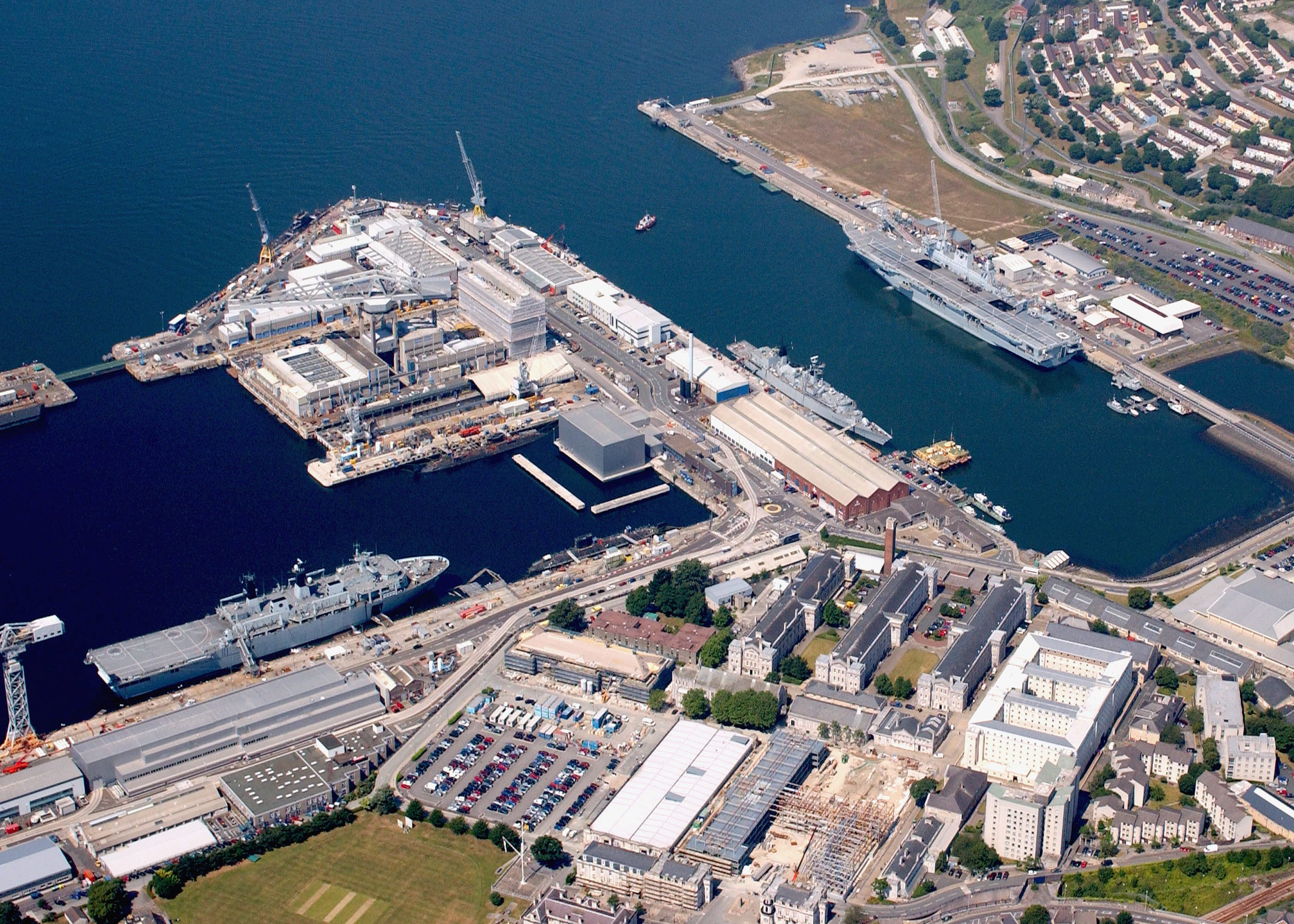
Photo of the core of HMNB Devonport, with several ships alongside, in 2005: No.5 Basin (left), Weston Mill Lake and what is now RM Tamar (right), Fleet Maintenance Base and Submarine Refit Complex (top), HMS Drake fleet accommodation centre (bottom)

The Naval Base as a whole covers an area of 650 acres (2.6 km^{2}) with four miles (6 km) of waterfront; it has twenty-five tidal berths, five basins and fourteen dry docks (docks numbered 1 to 15, but there is no 13 Dock). The base employs 2,500 service personnel and civilians, supports circa 400 local firms and contributes approximately 10% to the income of Plymouth. The Naval Base commander has in recent years been a Commodore (RN), but in 2022 Brigadier Mike Tanner took command (the first Royal Marine officer to be appointed to the role).

=== Ships based at Devonport ===
In 2009 the Ministry of Defence announced the conclusion of a long-running review of the long-term role of three naval bases. It was decided that Devonport would no longer be used as a base for attack submarines (a move completed with the retirement of HMS Triumph in early 2025), and that the Type 45 destroyers would be based at Portsmouth. In November 2024, it was also decided to retire the Albion-class assault ships which were based at Devonport. However, Devonport continues to host most of the fleet's Type 23 class frigates. In 2018 the Secretary of State for Defence announced that the proposed new Type 26 frigates would all be based at Devonport when delivered starting in the latter 2020s.

Ships based at the port include:

==== Type 23 frigates ====
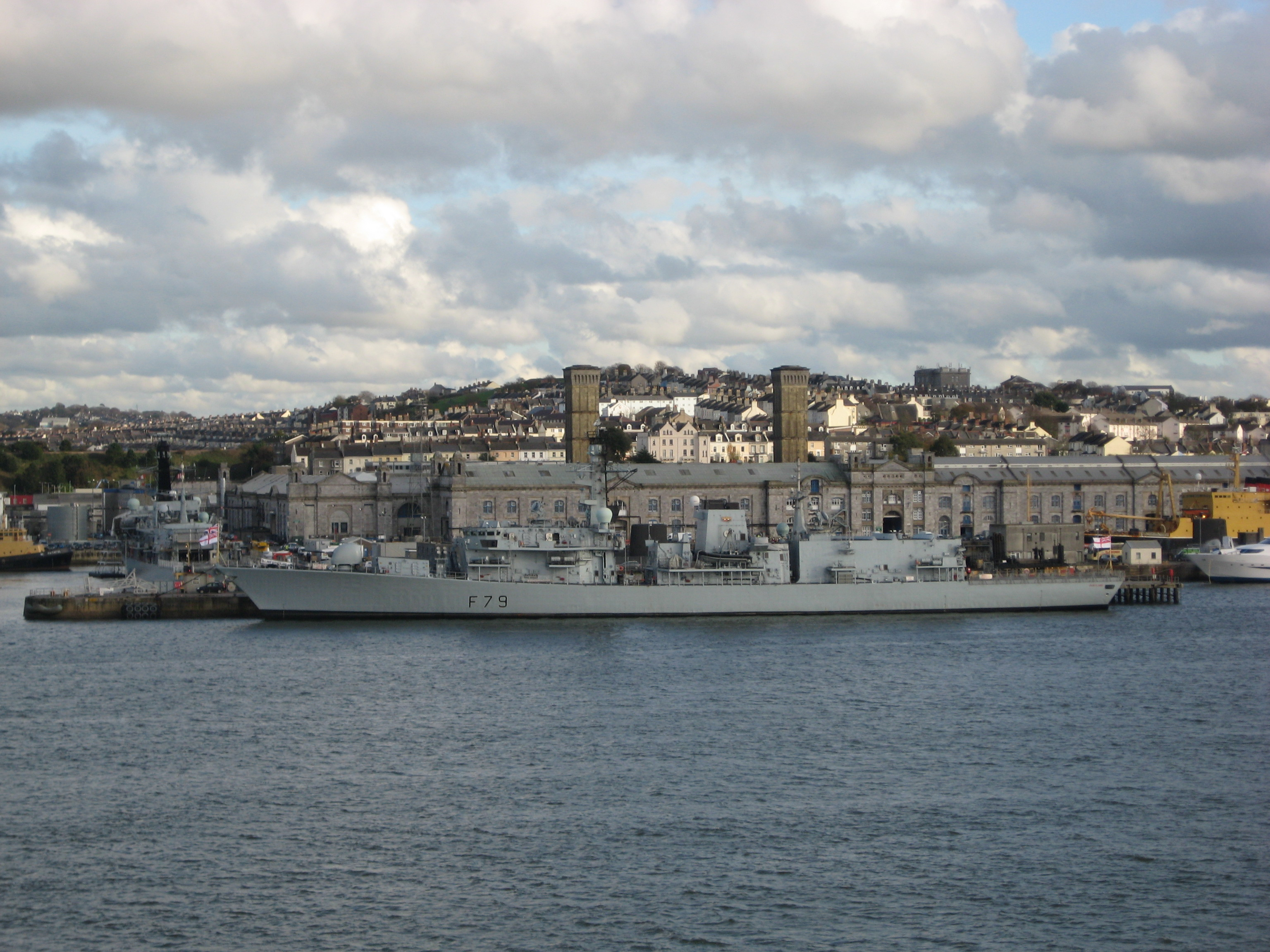
HMS Portland moored by the Quadrangle building

- HMS Portland
- HMS Somerset
- HMS Kent
- HMS Sutherland
- HMS St Albans

In changes to base porting arrangements announced in November 2017, HM Ships Argyll, Monmouth and Montrose were all to join the Portsmouth Flotilla (however, Monmouth retired in 2021, Montrose decommissioned in 2023 and Argyll in 2024); HM Ships Richmond, Kent and St Albans moved in the opposite direction, to Devonport. Richmond also became a Devonport ship on completion of her refit. St Albans moved to Devonport in July 2019 in preparation for her major refit. HMS Westminster retired in 2024 followed by HMS Northumberland in 2025. In 2025, it was confirmed that HMS Iron Duke (since retired) would relocate from Portsmouth to the Devonport naval base. Devonport became the sole base for Type 23 frigates with the retirement of HMS Lancaster in December 2025.

==== Survey ships ====
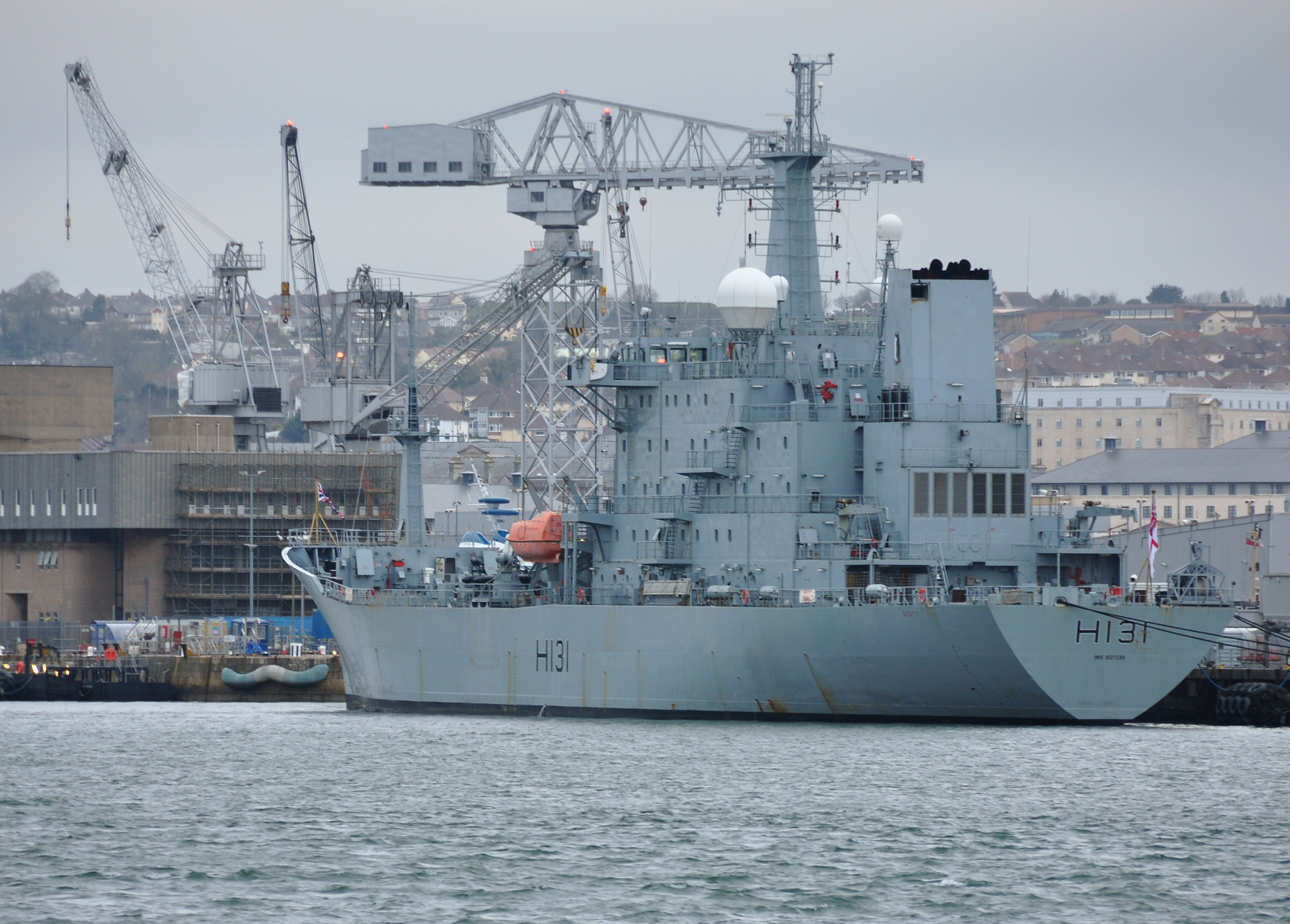
HMS Scott at Devonport

- HMS Magpie
- HMS Scott

==== Antarctic patrol ship ====
- HMS Protector

=== Other units based at Devonport ===
- Fleet Operational Standards and Training (FOST)
- Hydrographic, Meteorological & Oceanographic Training Group
  - 2 × Sea-class 15 m survey/hydrography vessels (Merlin and Fantome)
- HQ Amphibious Task Group
- HMS Vivid RNR (relocated to the South Yard from Mount Wise in 2004)
- RM Tamar/47 Commando (Raiding Group) Royal Marines
  - 10 Landing Craft Training Squadron
  - 4 Assault Squadron
  - 6 Assault Squadron
  - 9 Assault Squadron
  - 539 Assault Squadron
- Hasler NSRC (Naval Service Recovery Centre) & Hasler Company Royal Marines
- Southern Diving Group RN
  - 1 × Sea-class 15 m diving support boat (DSB Vulcan)
- Defence Estates South West
- Ministry of Defence Police

=== Dockyard facilities ===
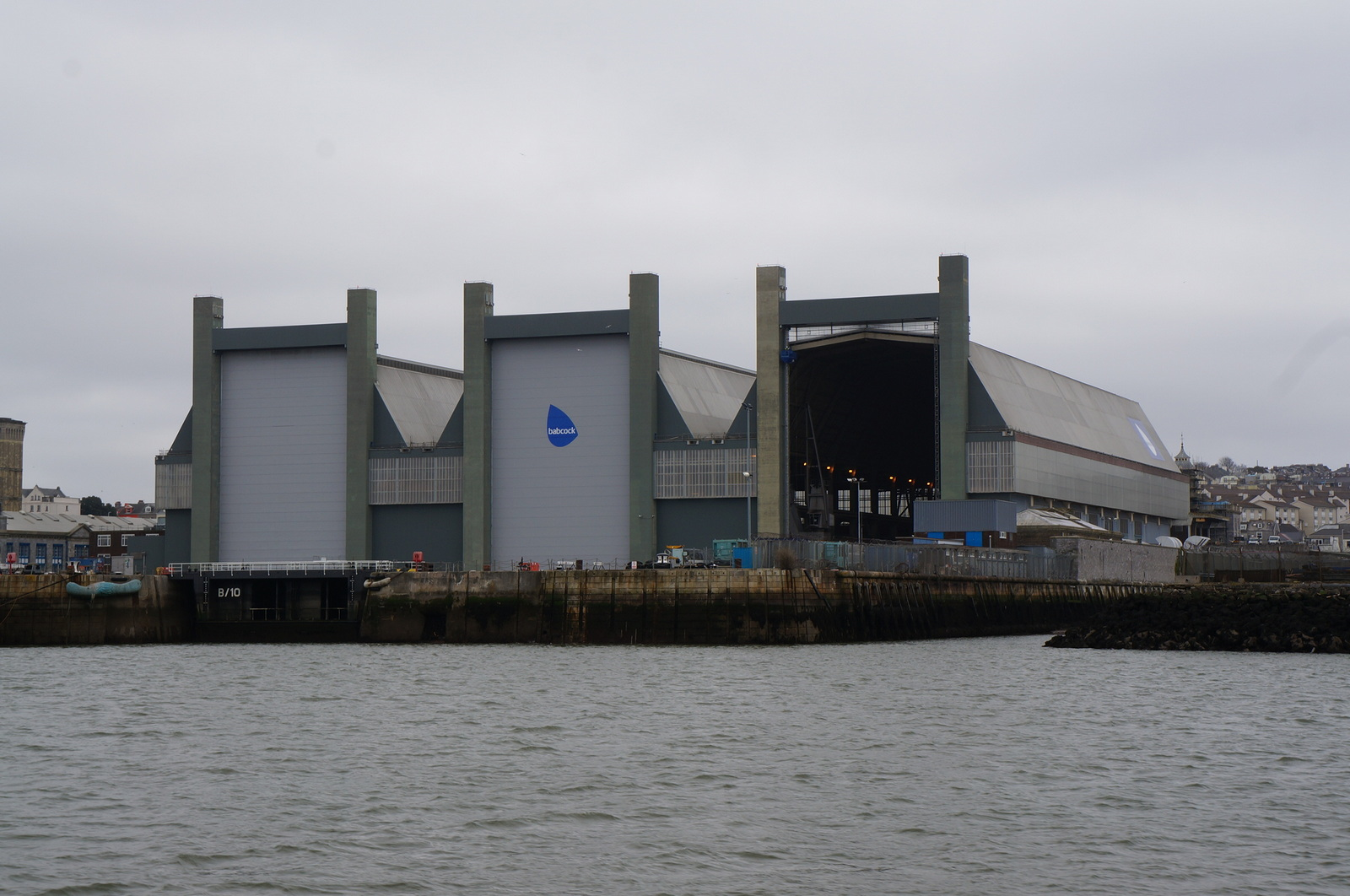
The covered dry docks of the Frigate Support Centre: part of Devonport Royal Dockyard since 1976

Babcock's privatised Devonport Royal Dockyard facility is co-located with HM Naval Base Devonport, providing 'through-life support for submarines, surface ships and associated systems and equipment'. Operational vessels are provided with 'in-service engineering maintenance support' from the yard, dry docks are available to 'maintain, refit, convert and modernise sophisticated modern surface warships' and specialised workshops enable complex systems to be 'removed, overhauled, tested and installed'.

In the early 1970s it was announced that Devonport would join Chatham and Rosyth in serving as a refit base for nuclear submarines; the Submarine Refit Centre duly opened in 1981. Since 2002, Devonport has been the sole refitting base for all Royal Navy nuclear submarines.

In 2022 Babcock began a ten-year programme of work to upgrade its Devonport Dockyard facilities. The project is described as 'a major infrastructure refurbishment of the nuclear licensed docking and berthing facilities at the dockyard' to meet the evolving requirements of the Royal Navy. The work is focused around No. 5 Basin, with Dry Docks 9, 10, 14 and 15 being upgraded (along with their surrounding buildings and infrastructure) to support the maintenance programme for 'new and existing classes of submarine', along with Dry Docks 8, 11 and 12 which will be used for new classes of frigate (some of which are likely to be too large for the covered docks of the current refit complex).

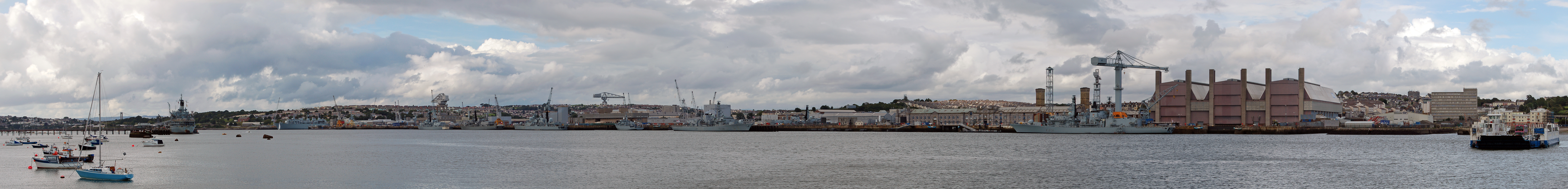
Panoramic photo of Devonport Royal Dockyard (the 'North Yard') as seen from the Torpoint ferry

==== Nuclear submarine decommissioning ====
Thirteen out of service nuclear submarines were stored at Devonport in 2018.

- HMS Conqueror
- HMS Courageous (preserved in North Yard as a museum ship)
- HMS Sceptre
- HMS Spartan
- HMS Splendid
- HMS Sovereign
- HMS Superb
- HMS Tireless
- HMS Torbay
- HMS Trafalgar
- HMS Turbulent
- HMS Valiant
- HMS Warspite

In 2018, the UK Parliament's Public Accounts Committee criticised the slow rate of decommissioning of these submarines, with the Ministry of Defence admitting that it had put off decommissioning due to the cost. The National Audit Office in 2019 stated that the costs of laid up storage of all nuclear submarines had reached £500 million, and they represent a liability of £7.5 billion.

=== South Yard (Freeport) ===
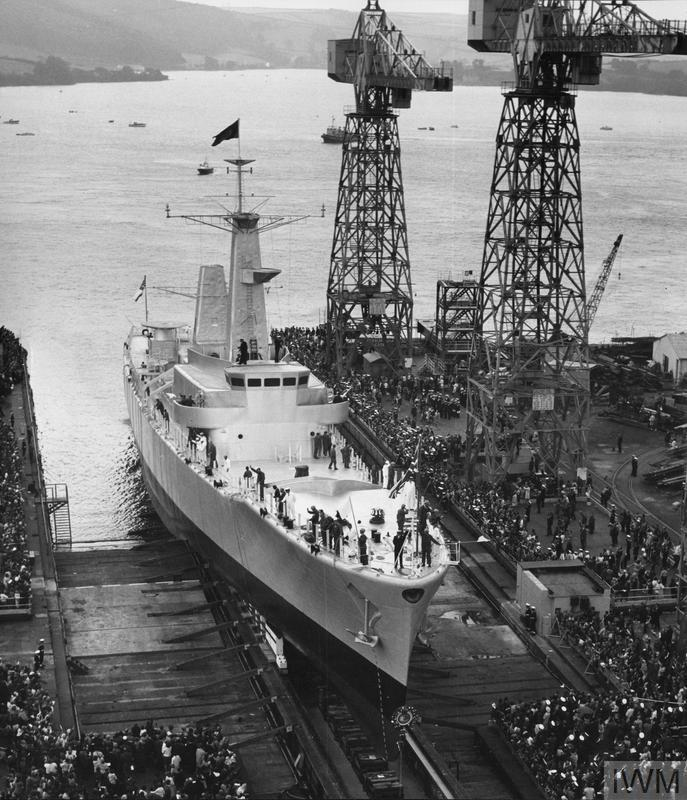
The last warship to be built at Devonport was HMS Scylla, launched from No.3 Slip on 8 August 1968.

Several sections of the South Yard (the oldest part of the Naval Base) are no longer used by the Ministry of Defence. Its historic slips were formerly the shipbuilding centre of the Royal Dockyard. In 2012 the southernmost part of the site was sold to a private company and in 2014 the northernmost section was leased to Plymouth City Council as part of a City Deal regeneration project; other areas are leased to Babcock. In 2022 the whole of the South Yard (except for the north-east corner of the site) became part of Plymouth's Freeport.

==== Princess Yachts ====
In 2012 Princess Yachts acquired the freehold to 20 acres (8 hectares) at the southern end of the site, which now houses its construction facility for 'superyachts'. The company sees itself as continuing the boat building tradition within the dockyard, and 'adding drama to the site' with yachts being moved around the quayside, launched on No. 3 Slip, tested in No. 2 Slip and moored alongside the quay wall. Alongside the modern yachts, classic vessels are repaired and restored by Stirling & Son, on and around the 18th-century covered No. 1 Slip.

==== Oceansgate ====
In 2014 it was announced, as part of a 'City Deal' regeneration agreement, that more of the South Yard would be 'unlocked' with a view to it becoming a 'marine industries hub'. By 2016 the northern section of the South Yard was being redeveloped in phases, from east to west, with a marketing strategy focused on 'the development of marine industries and the high growth area of marine science and technology'. The area has been renamed Oceansgate.

Phase 1 (east of the 18th-century dockyard wall) was completed in 2018; Phase 2 (immediately to the west) was completed in 2021. These areas, containing new-build offices and business units, have been designated an Enterprise Zone (and are not part of the Freeport). Phase 3, the westernmost area extending to the waterfront, encompasses three 18th-century dry docks and several listed buildings; it was being offered for sale on a lease of up to 295 years. As of 2022 this area has been incorporated into the Freeport plan.

Devonport Naval Heritage Centre, a volunteer-run maritime museum, is currently housed within two listed buildings in the Oceansgate area of the yard.

==== MOD ====
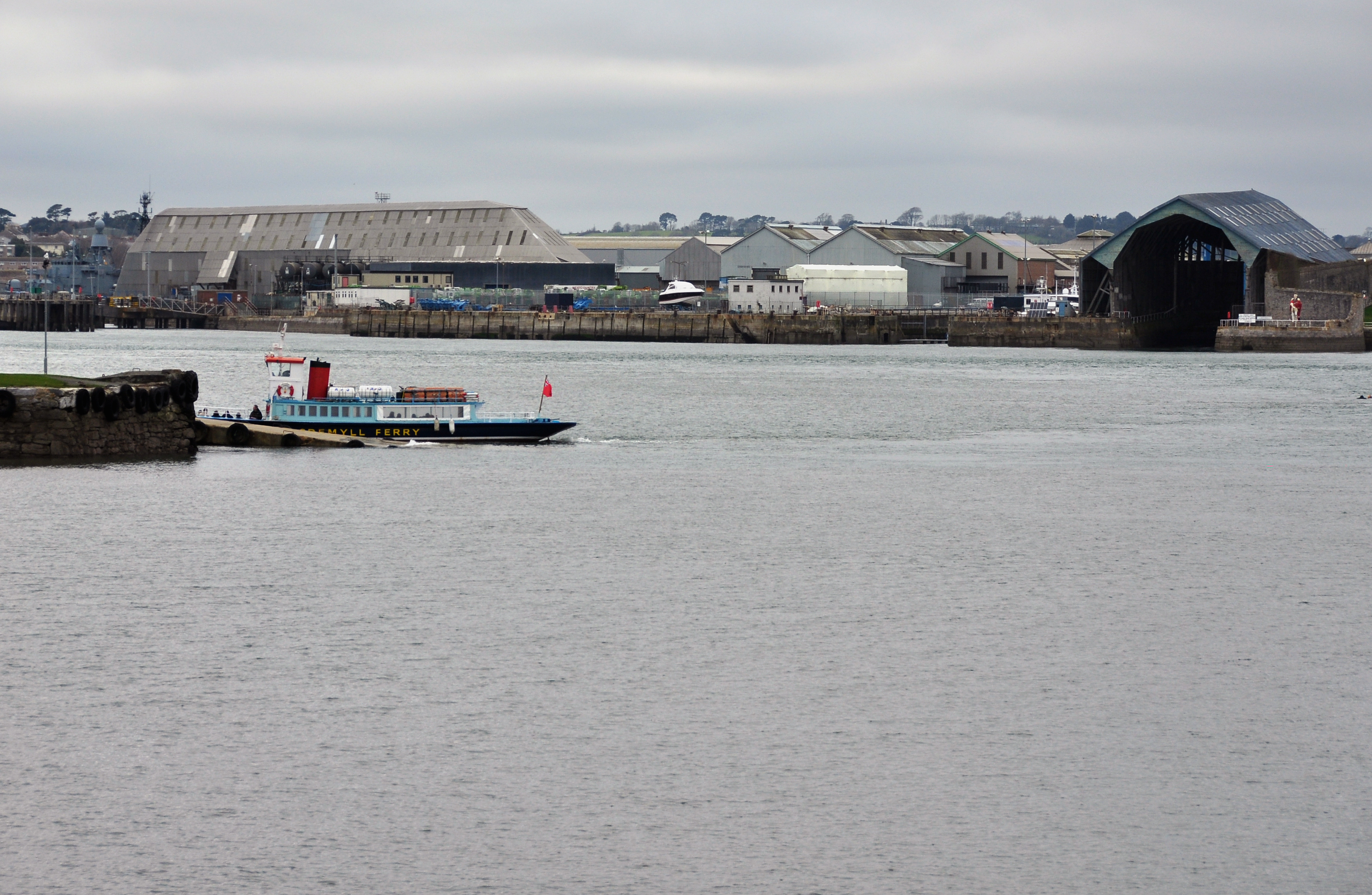
The South Yard seen from Cremyll: on the left is No. 5 covered slip (later used as a scrieve board), on the right No.1 covered slip; in between some of the more utilitarian buildings of the MOD area.

The majority of the South Yard site remains in Ministry of Defence (MOD) ownership. All land to the south of 'Oceansgate' (with the exception of the area which is owned by Princess Yachts) is currently retained by the MOD, with No. 4 Slip having been recently refurbished for use with landing craft. Largely used by MOD contractors, it remains a closed site and subject to security restrictions.

==== Freeport ====
As approved by the government in December 2022, the South Yard is now one of the three 'freezones' of the Plymouth and South Devon Freeport. Freeport status provides certain tax advantages for businesses based there. The South Yard Freeport zone includes all the land owned by the MOD and Princess Yachts, and most of the land leased to Plymouth City Council as 'Oceansgate'.

The Freeport's business plan envisages the South Yard being focused on marine and defence sector development, and at the same time 'forming the centrepiece of the Freeport’s Innovation Hotbed'. Proposed developments include expansion of Oceansgate beyond its current footprint, construction of a new factory for Princess Yachts and the building of a new Innovation Centre and 'Mobility Hub' (described elsewhere as a 'huge multi-storey car park'). (Development of the Innovation Centre will require 'relocating' the Naval Heritage Centre.) Eventually it is hoped that the Freeport with its tax advantages will enable 'defence and other contractors to invest and bring back into productive and sustainable use dormant waterfront spaces [...] which, for the time being, must remain "behind the wire" [i.e. within the MOD restricted area]'.

== History ==
=== Overview ===
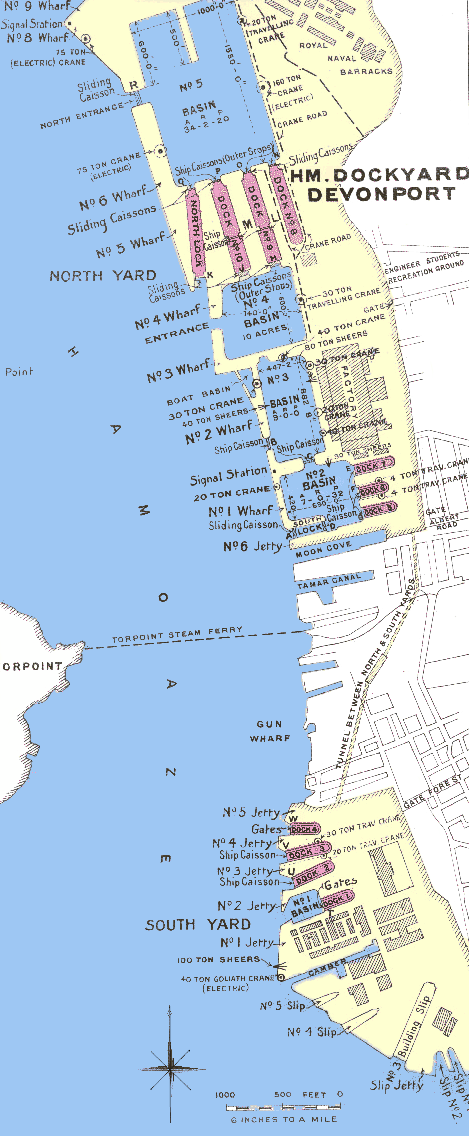
A 1909 map of HM Dockyard, Devonport, also showing the Gun Wharf (Morice Yard) located between the South Yard and the North Yard

From its original 17th-century site, around No.1 Dock in what is now called the South Yard, the dockyard expanded in stages (first to the south and then progressively northwards) over the next two-and-a-half centuries. Key periods in the geographical development of the yard included:

- The building of Plymouth Dock and Yard (1692–1698).
- The building of Morice Ordnance Yard (1719–1720) alongside the dockyard to the north (this became part of the dockyard during the Second World War).
- The Great Rebuilding (1760–1790) which saw the dockyard expand to the south.
- The building of Keyham Steam Yard (1844–1865) to the north of the Morice Yard.
- The building of the Keyham Extension (1896–1907) which more than doubled the size of the Keyham yard.
- Post-war appropriation of adjacent land (1950s) with bomb-damaged streets were brought within the dockyard perimeter to allow for future expansion.
- The reclamation of Weston Mill Lake (1972–1979), now the northernmost part of the base.

=== Origins ===
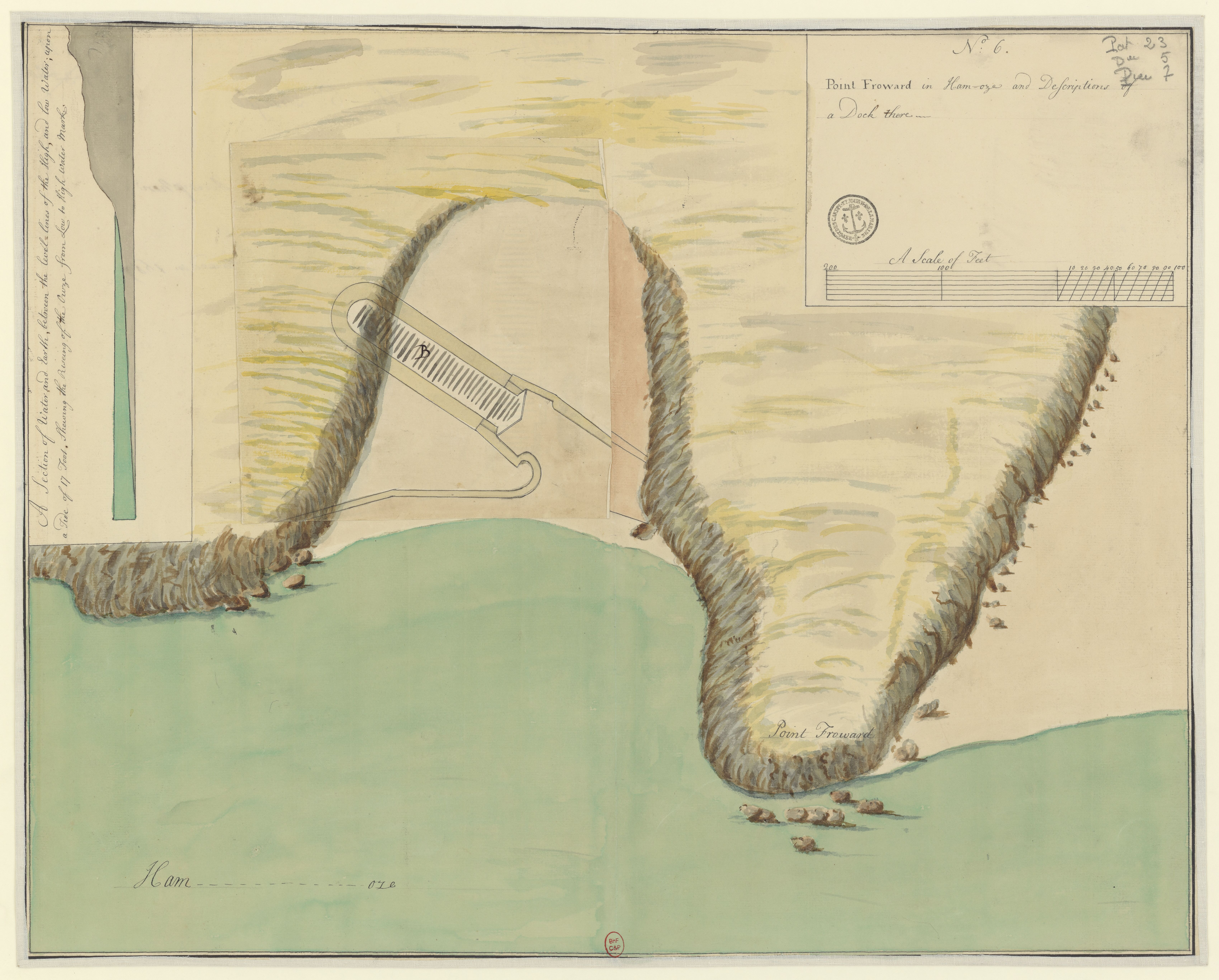
A 1689 proposal by Edmund Dummer for a single cruiser dock at Point Froward (the future site of the dockyard)

In 1689 Prince William of Orange became William III and almost immediately he required the building of a new dry dock west of Portsmouth, 'for cruisers only' (to support the cruiser squadrons that patrolled the western approaches to the English Channel). Edmund Dummer, Surveyor of the Navy, travelled the West Country searching for an area where the dock could be built. Once he had settled on Plymouth, it took the rest of the year for the Admiralty to decide between two possible locations; eventually, in preference to Cattewater, they settled on a site on the Hamoaze (a section of the River Tamar) in the parish of Stoke Damerel. On 30 December 1690, a contract was let for a dock to be built; having selected the location, Dummer was given responsibility for designing and building it.

Then the project began to grow: first the King requested a larger dock (suitable for first-rate ships, as well as cruisers), then the Navy required a basin to protect the dock entrance; and finally, in July 1692, the Admiralty resolved that 'where the new dock is now building' a full Royal Navy Dockyard should be established, with 'buildings erected therein as well for the accommodation of the officers of the Navy that shall be appointed there, as for storehouses and other services'. This was the start of Plymouth (later Devonport) Royal Dockyard.

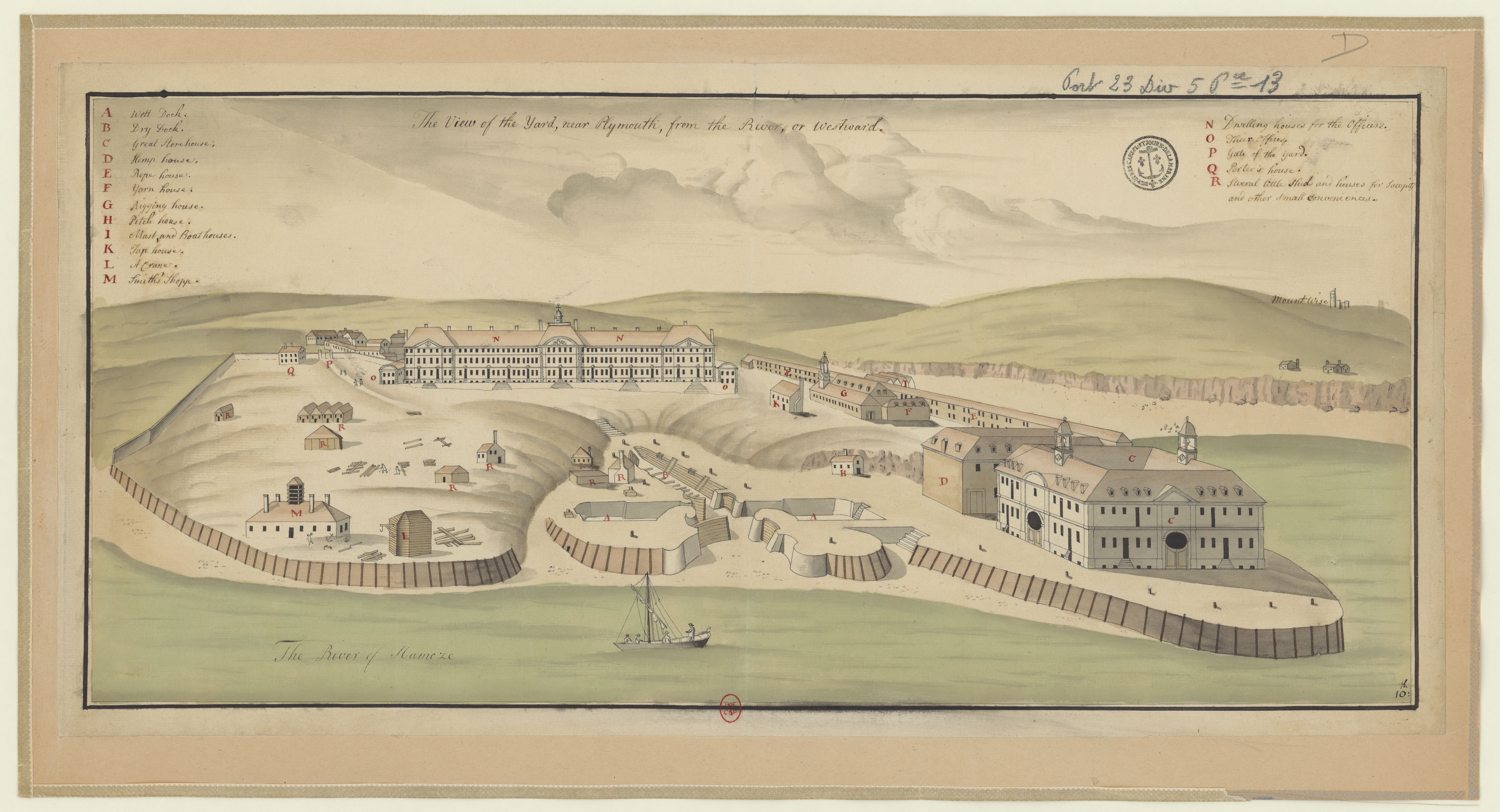
The View of the Yard, near Plymouth, from the River, or Westward by Edmund Dummer, 1694

At the heart of his new dockyard, Dummer placed a stone-lined wet dock, giving access to what proved to be the first successful stepped stone dry dock in Europe. Previously the Navy Board had relied upon timber as the major building material for dry docks, which resulted in high maintenance costs and was also a fire risk. The docks Dummer designed were stronger with more secure foundations and stepped sides that made it easier for men to work beneath the hull of a docked vessel. These innovations also allowed rapid erection of staging and greater workforce mobility. He discarded the earlier three-sectioned hinged gate, which was labour-intensive in operation, and replaced it with the simpler and more mobile two-sectioned gate.

Dummer wished to ensure that naval dockyards were efficient working units that maximised available space, as evidenced by the simplicity of his design layout at Plymouth Dock. He introduced a centralised storage area (the quadrangular Great Storehouse) alongside the basin, and a logical positioning of other buildings around the yard. The southern boundary of his yard was formed by a 'double' rope-house (combining the previously separate tasks of spinning and laying within a single building); the upper floor was used for the repair of sails and a separate rigging house stood nearby. The anchor smithery with its fire and forge was positioned to the north, safely separate from the other buildings. On high ground overlooking the rest of the yard he built a grand terrace of thirteen three-storey houses for the senior dockyard officers (the first known example in the country of a palace-front terrace); the commissioner was accommodated in the centre, and at each end of the terrace was a two-storey block of offices (one for the commissioner, the other for the Clerk of the Cheque). Work on the dockyard was completed by 1698. Two years later a chapel was built, alongside the Porter's Lodge at the main gate (it was destroyed by a fire in 1799).

Most of these buildings and structures were rebuilt over ensuing years, including Dummer's original wet dock and dry dock (completely rebuilt in the 1840s and now known as No. 1 Basin and No. 1 Dock). The terrace survived into the 20th century, but was largely destroyed in the Blitz along with several others of Devonport's historic buildings. Just one end section of the terrace survives; dating from 1692 to 1696, it is the earliest surviving building in any royal dockyard.

Plans and elevations from Edmund Dummer's 1694 survey of the building of the dockyard
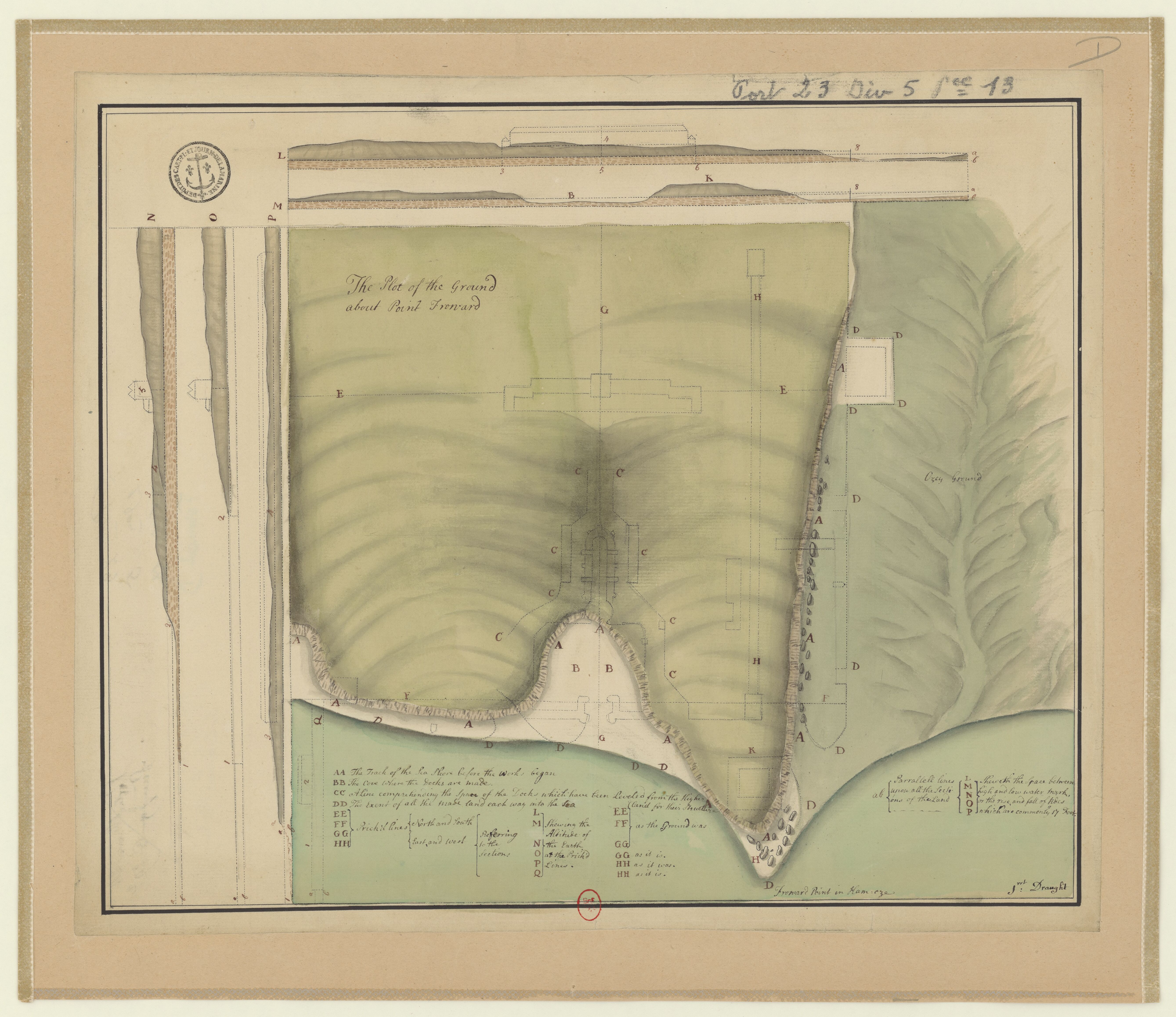
The Plot of the Ground about Point Froward (site of the dockyard)

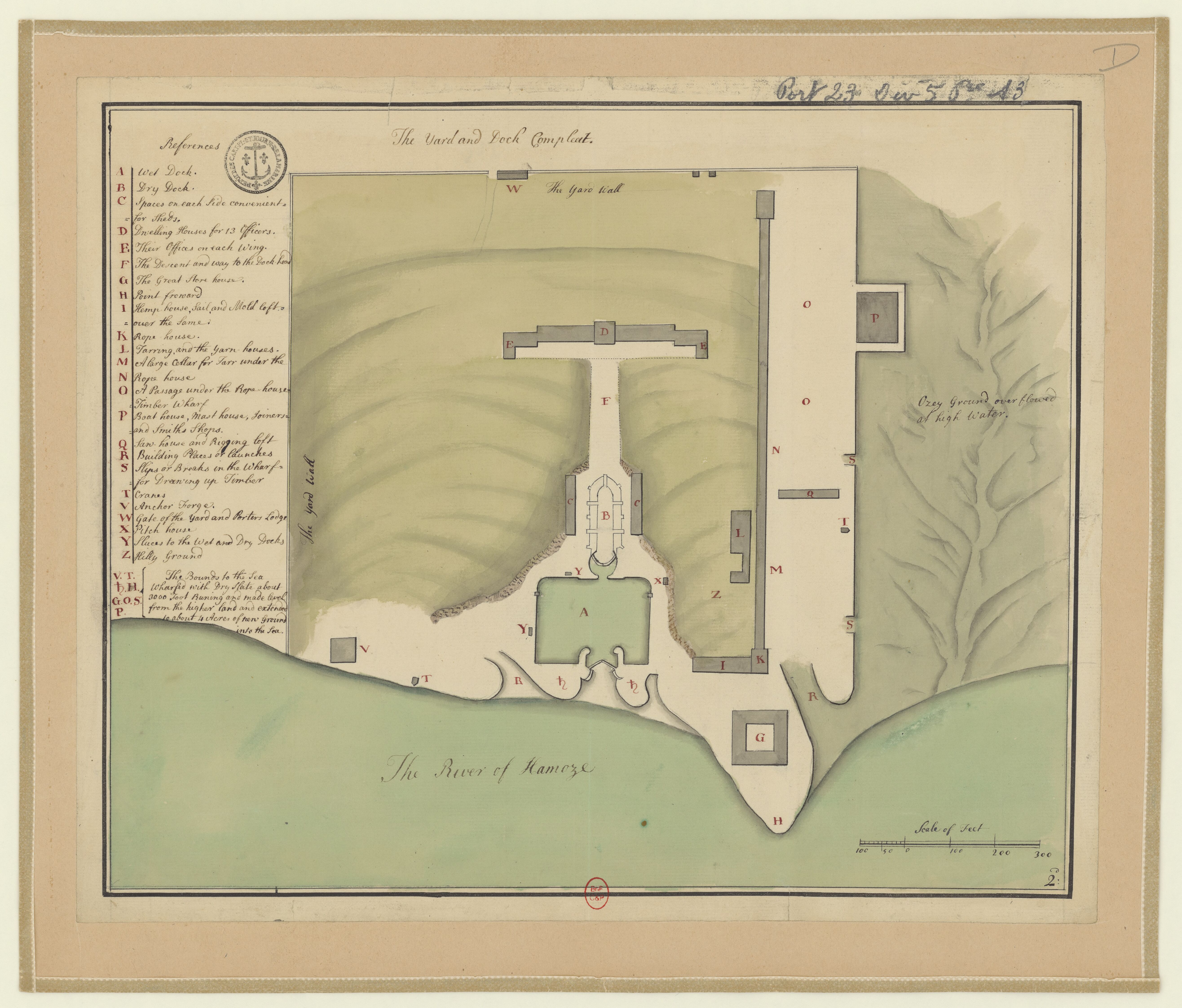
The Yard and Dock Compleat

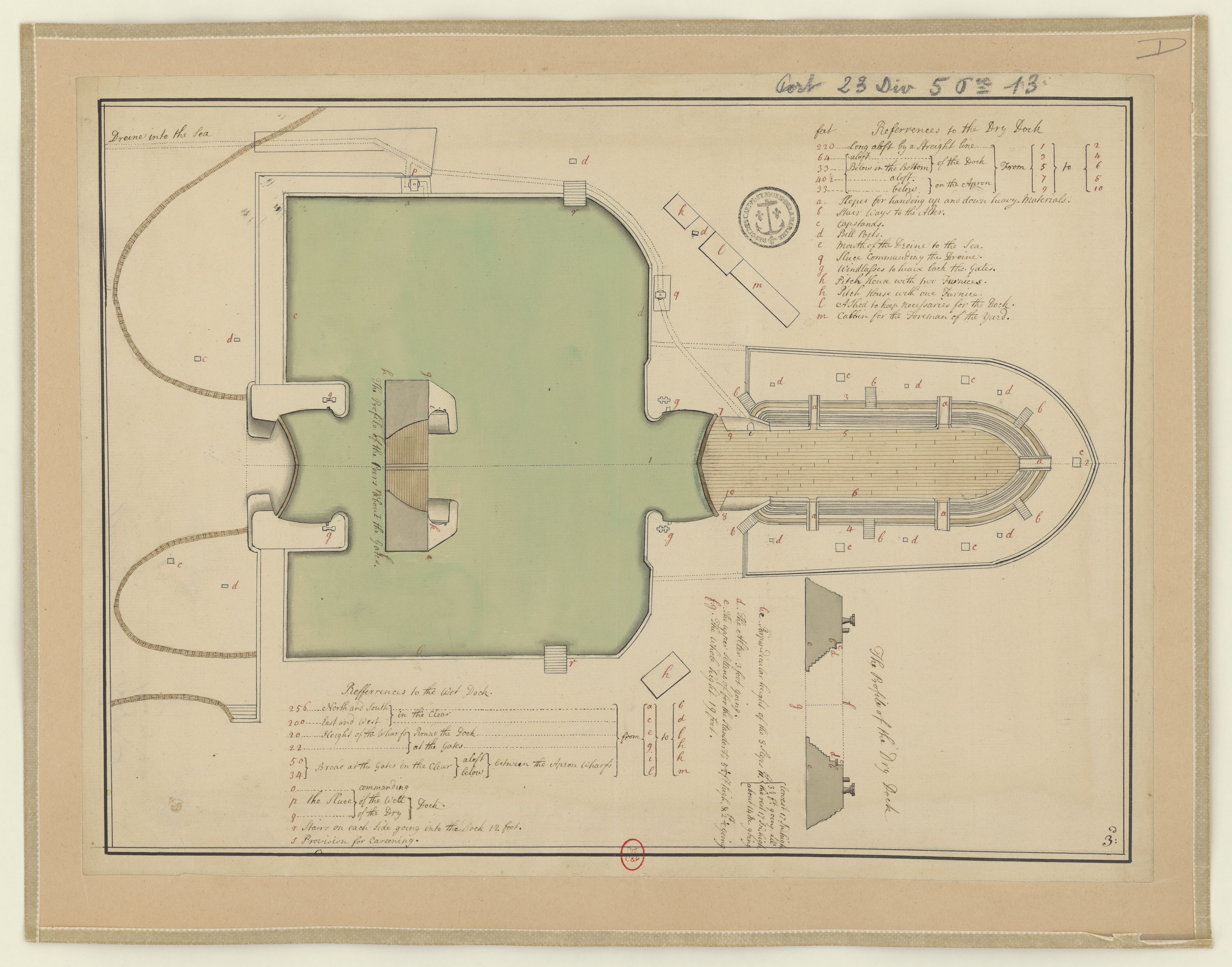
The Wet Dock and Dry Dock

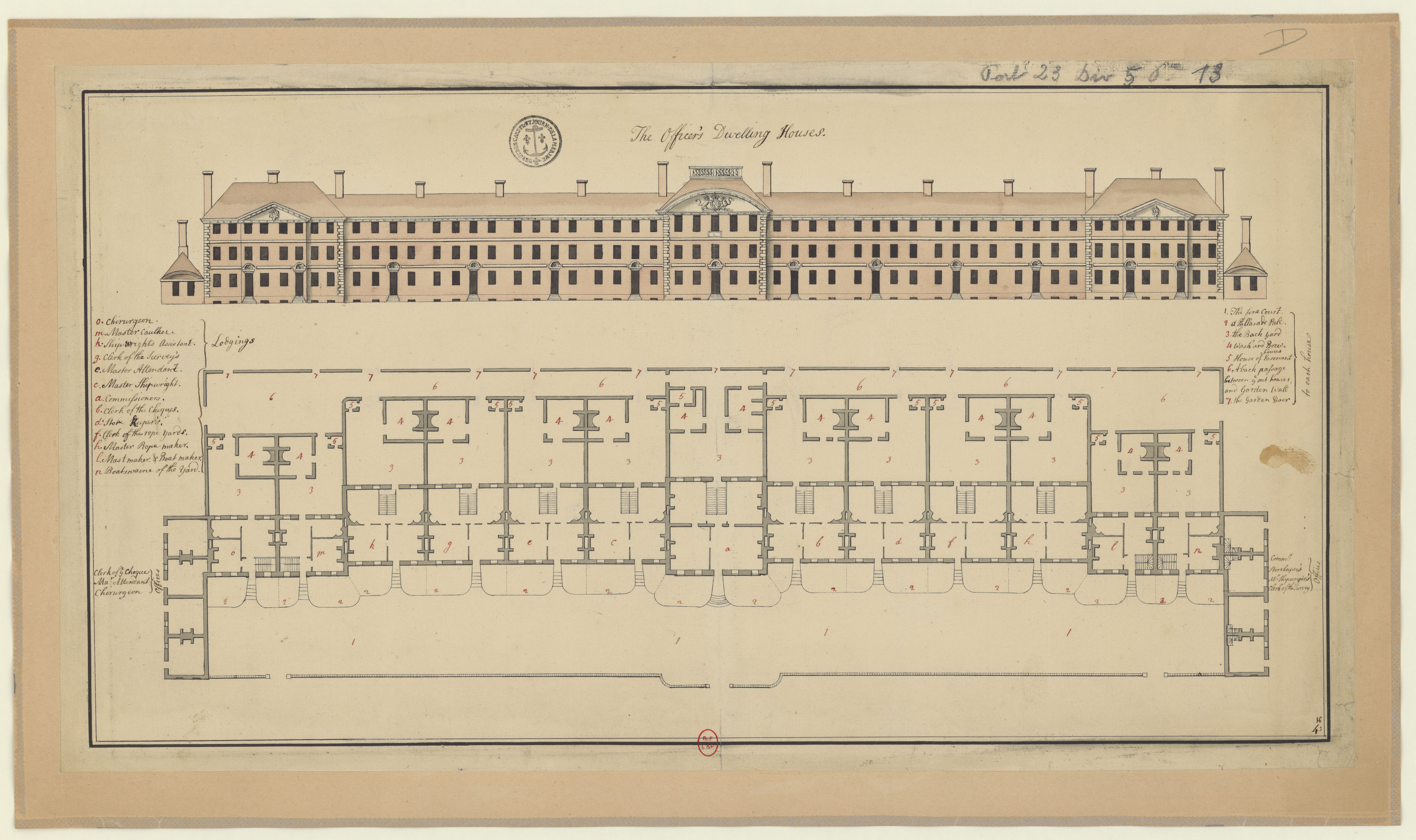
The Officers' Dwelling Houses

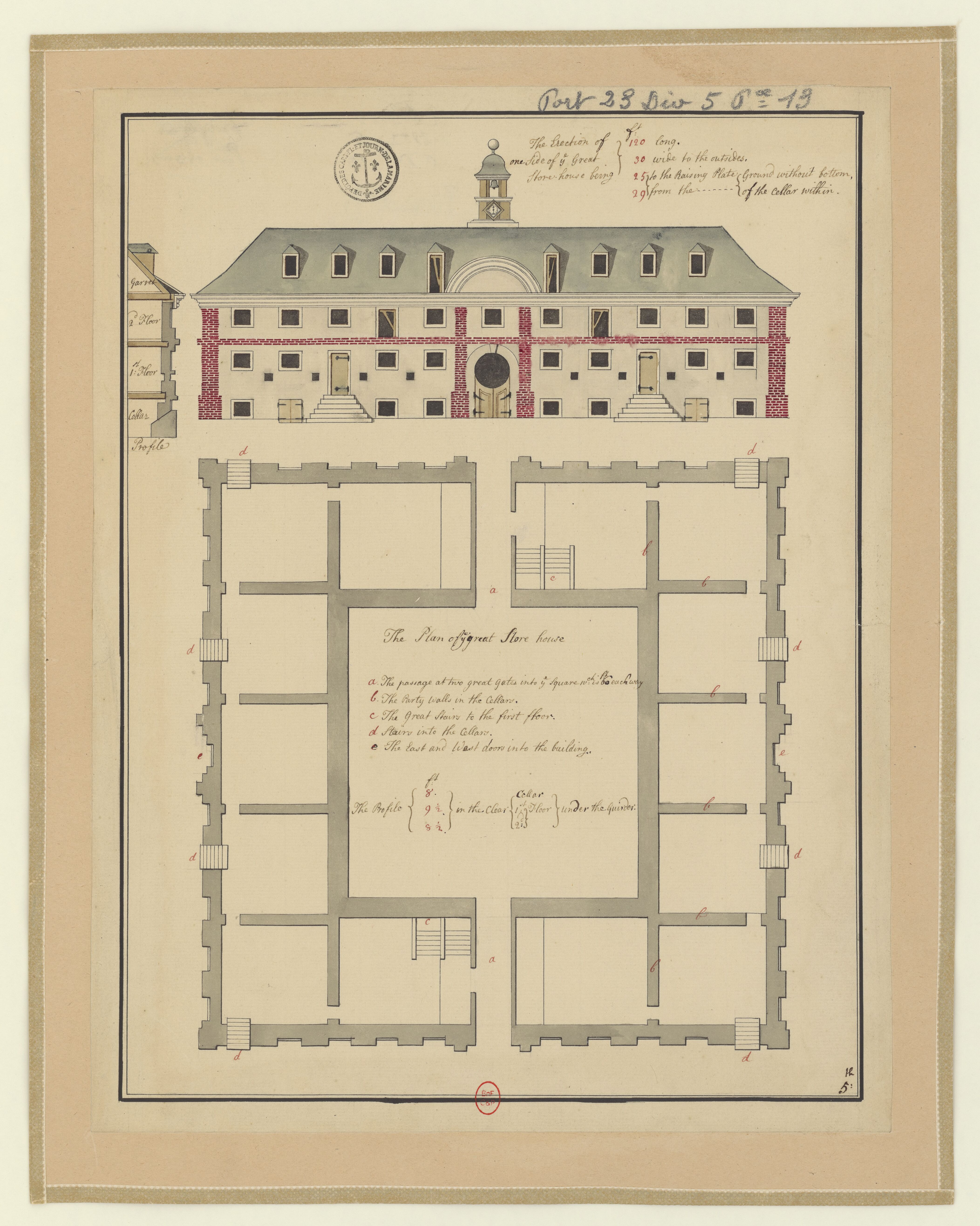
The Great Store house

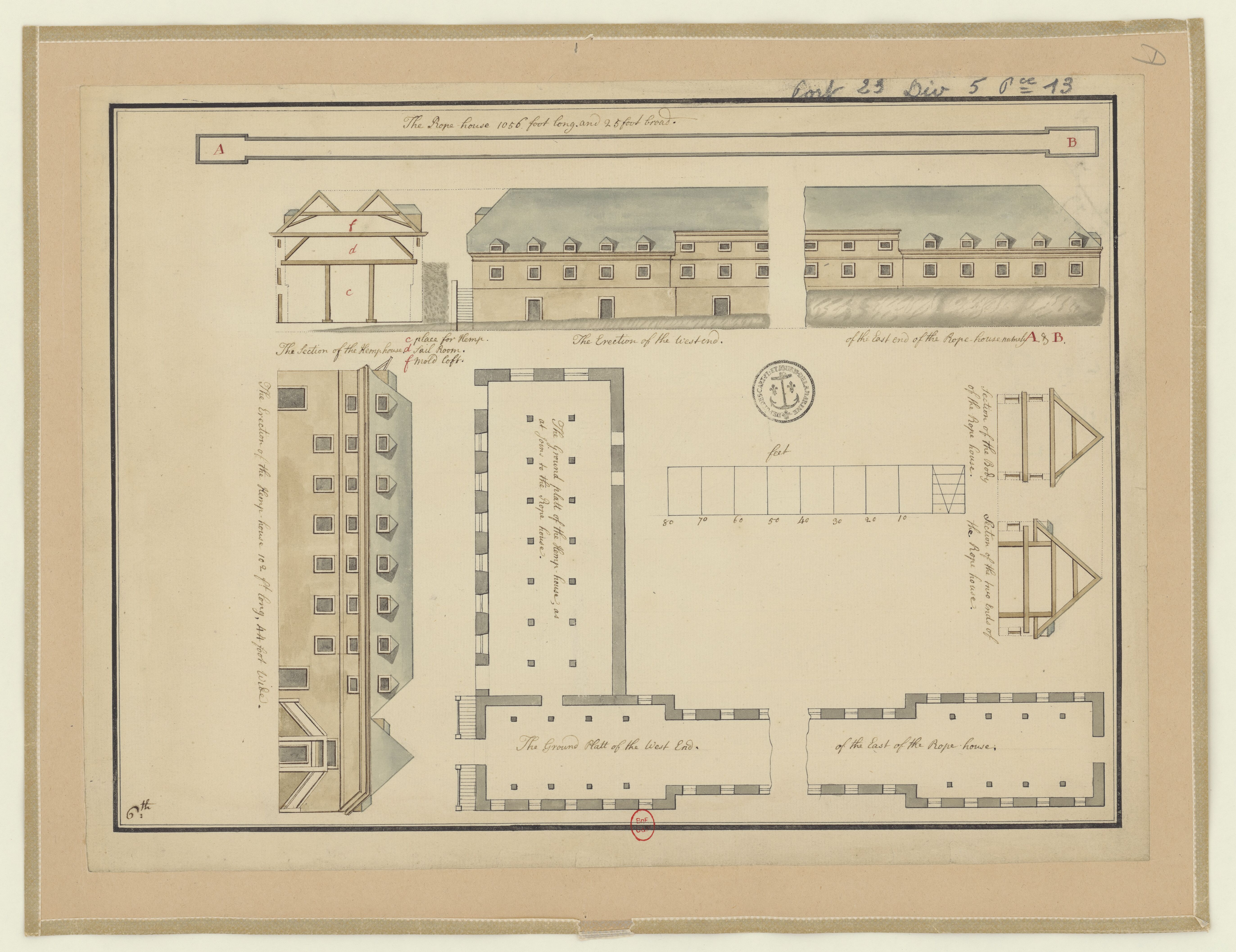
The Rope house 1056 foot long and 25 foot broad

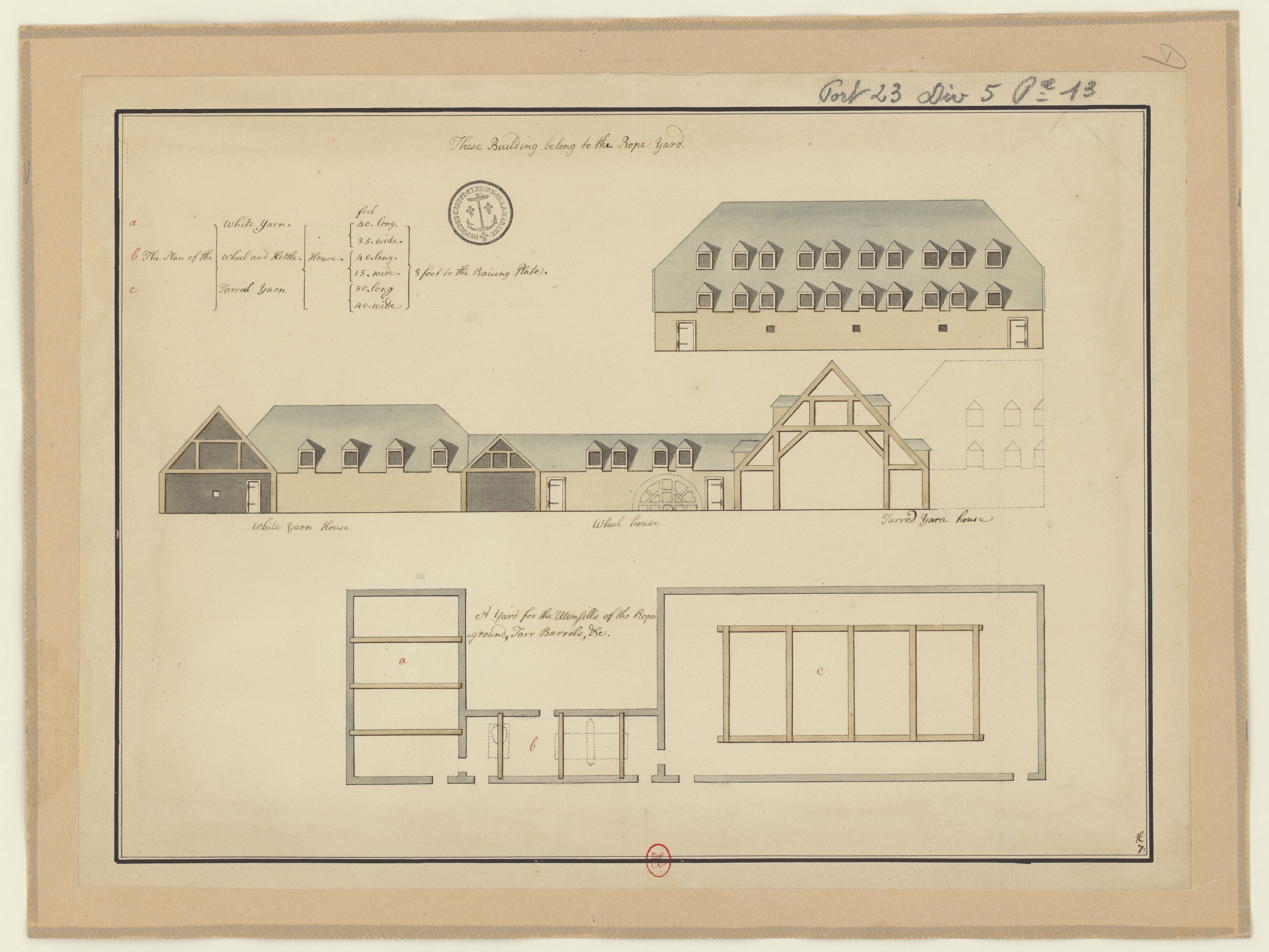
These Building [sic] belong to the Rope yard (Tarring and Yarn houses)

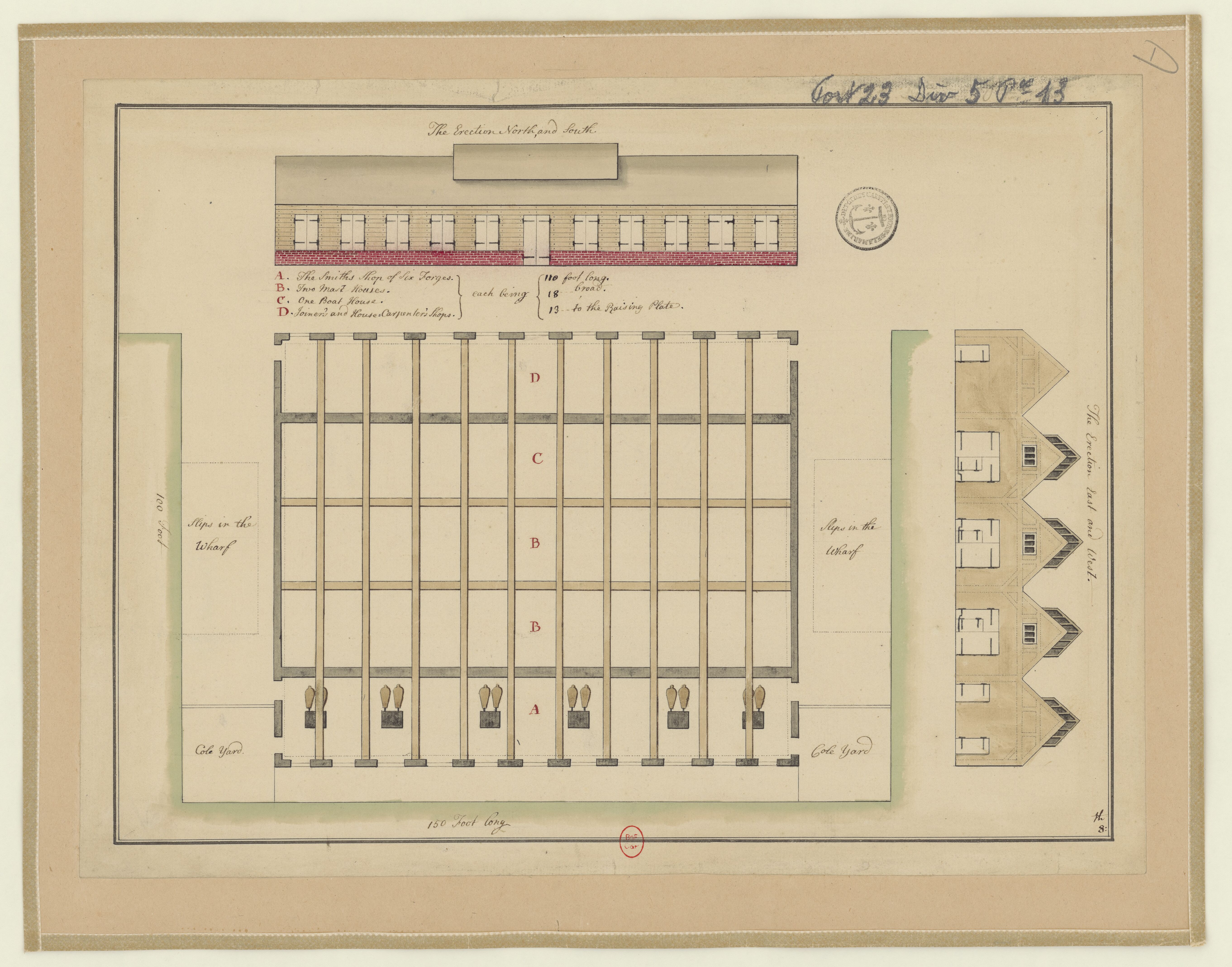
Combined Boat house, Mast house, Joiners' and Smiths' shops

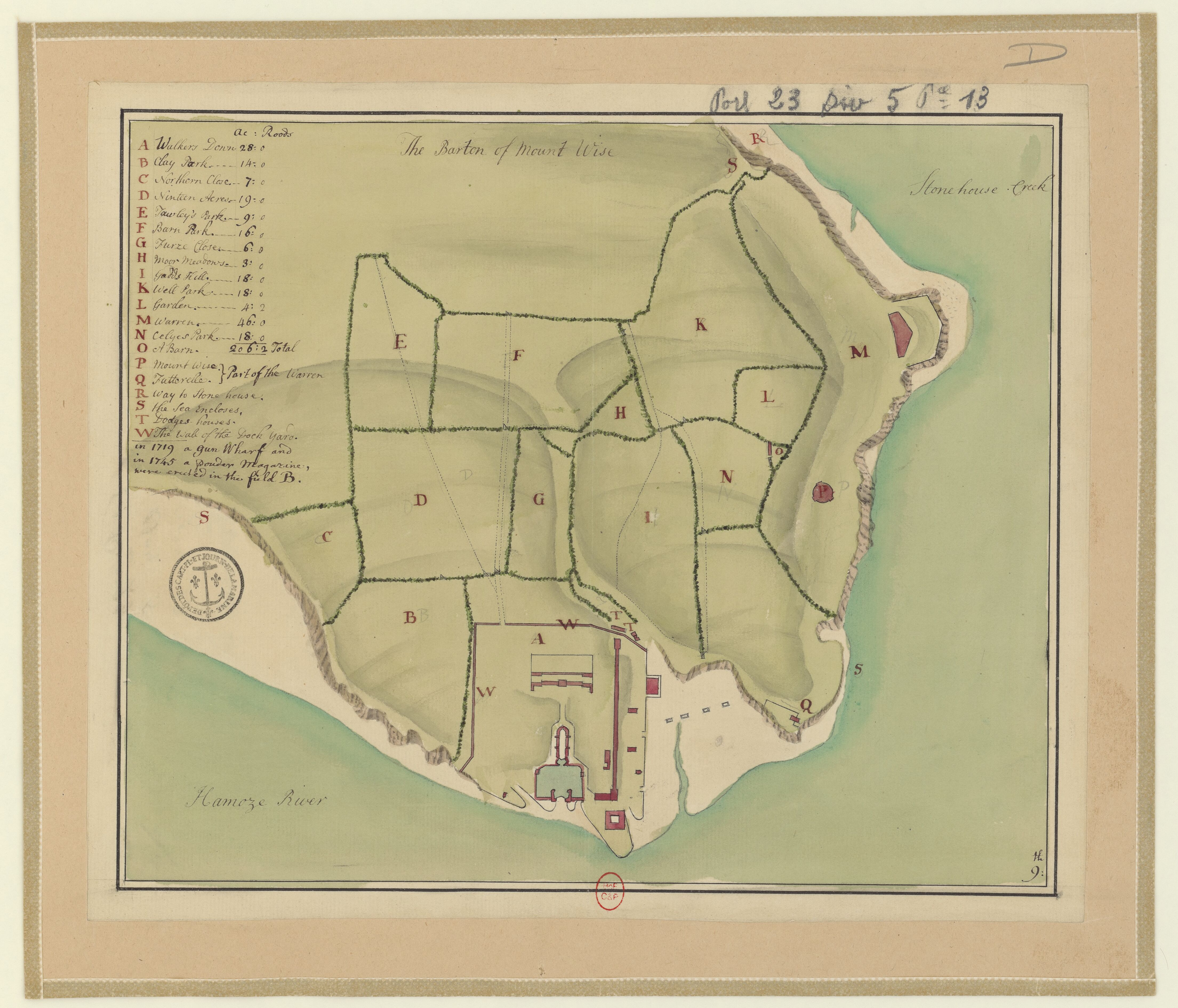
The Barton of Mount Wise: the dockyard and surrounding fields

=== Subsequent development ===
Once the dockyard was up and running, people (among them civilian workers from the dockyard) began to settle and build houses in the immediate vicinity. The settlement came to be known as Plymouth Dock; it was renamed Devonport in 1824.

==== South Yard ====
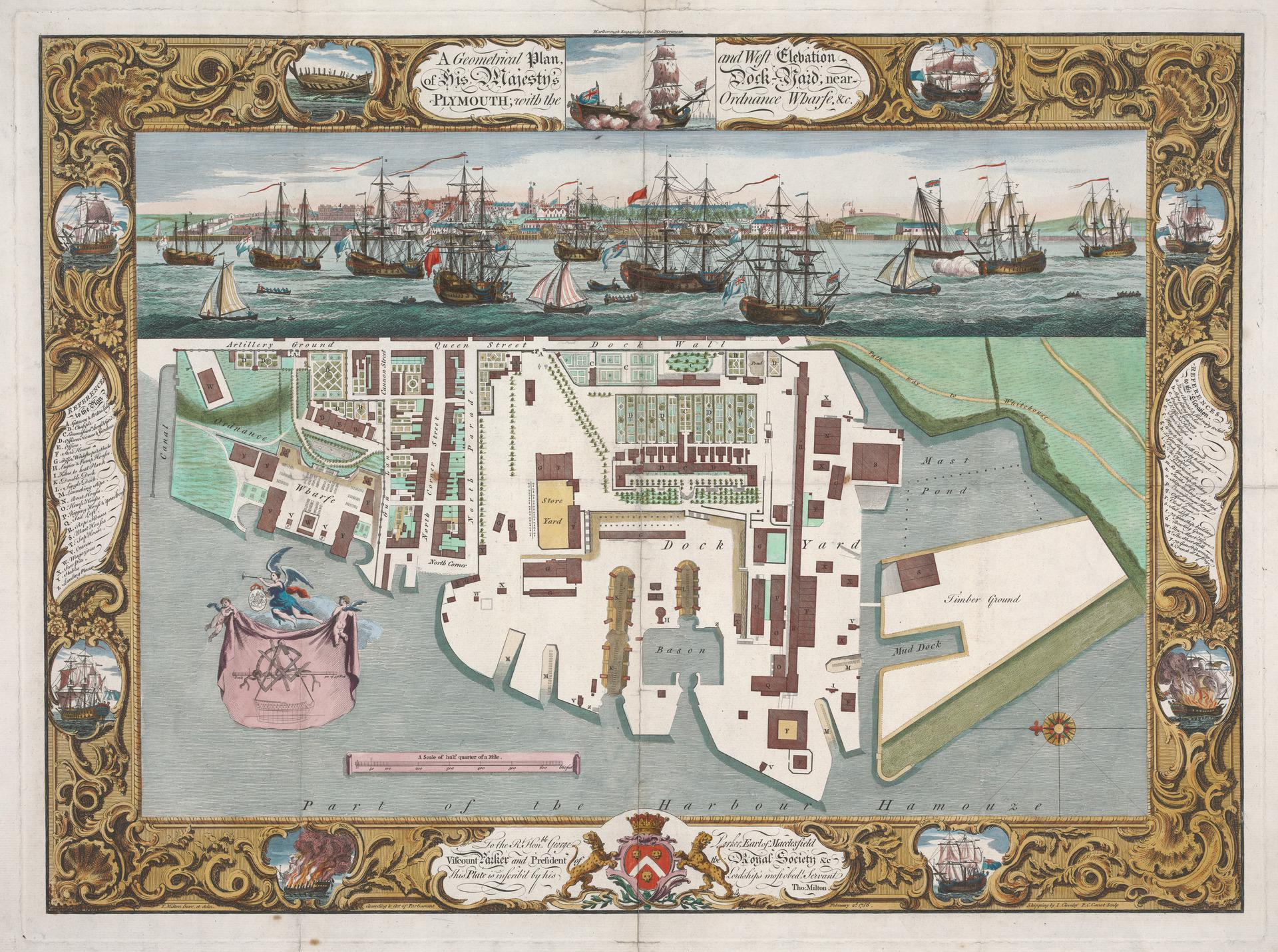
A Geometrical Plan, and West Elevation, of His Majesty's Dock-Yard near Plymouth, with the Ordnance Wharfe, &c.. Engraving by Thomas Milton (1756) showing the extent of the yard before the Great Rebuilding.

The area where the dockyard began is now known as the South Yard. It was here that Dummer built his groundbreaking stone dry dock and basin. A further, double-dock (i.e. long enough to accommodate two ships of the line, end to end) was added, just north of the basin, in the 1720s. Slipways were also added in the early 18th century, either side of the dry docks, to enable shipbuilding to take place. The numbers employed at the yard increased from 736 in 1711 to 2,464 in 1730. Around this time the small cove on the south side of the dockyard was partially reclaimed to create an enclosed mast pond and ground which was used for storing timber.

===== The Great Rebuilding =====
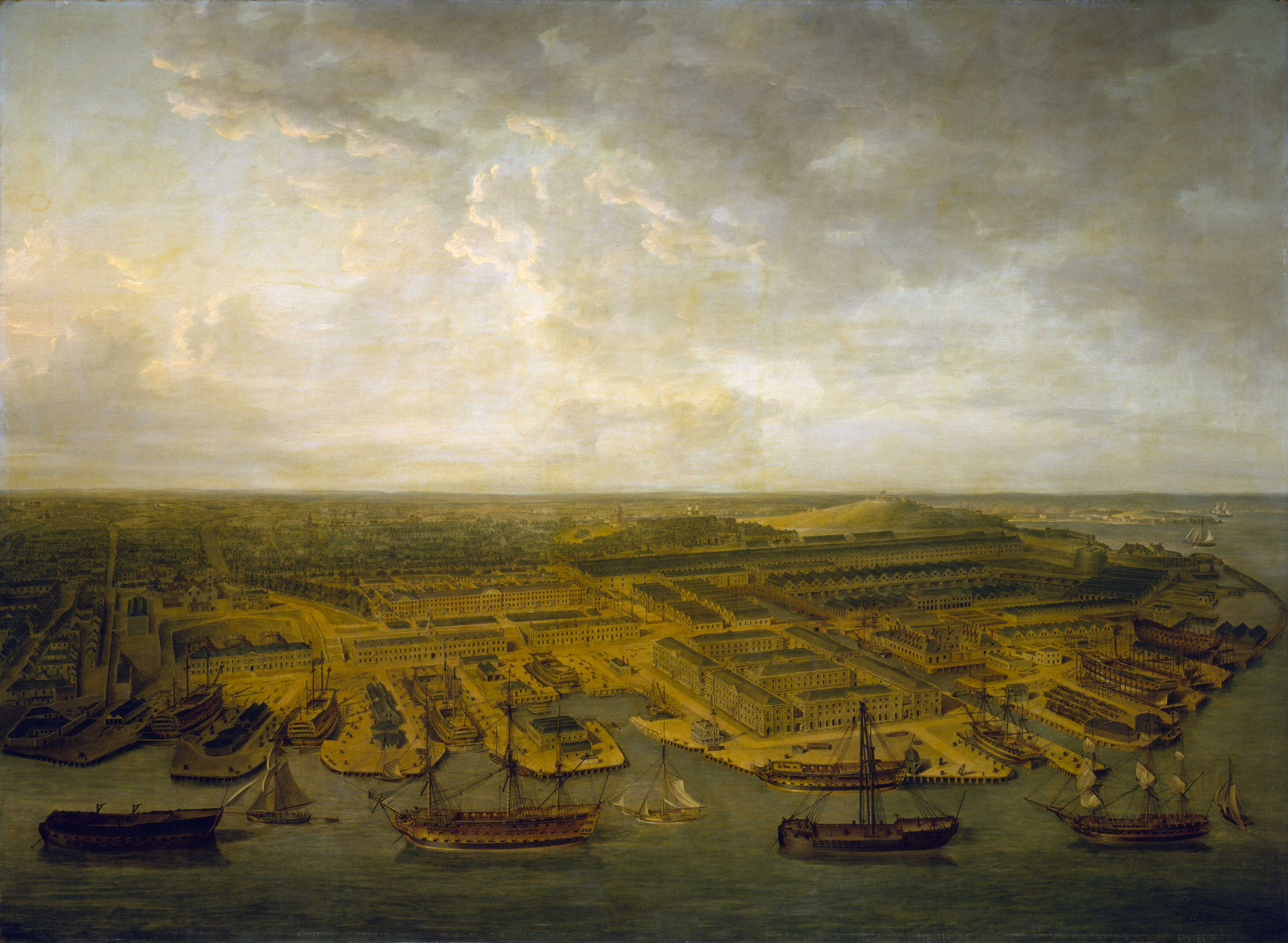
Plymouth Dockyard by Nicholas Pocock (1798) shows the yard after the recently-completed Great Rebuilding. Centre front is Dummer's 1690s stone basin and dock: to its left, one double and two single dry docks; to its right, the 1761 double quadrangle storehouse. Behind the docks: pedimented workshops and the 1691 officers' terrace. On the right of the picture: building slips on the foreshore, then the smithery, timber stores, mast and boat houses, with the long 1760s roperies beyond them (in front of Mount Wise).

In the 1760s a period of expansion began, leading to a configuration which (despite subsequent rebuildings) can still be seen today : five slipways, four dry docks and a basin. The two additional docks were built, in place of a pair of slips to the north of the double-dock, in 1762 and 1789. (Slipways were used for shipbuilding, but the main business of the eighteenth-century yard was the repair, maintenance and equipping of the fleet, for which the dry docks and basin were used). New slips were built on the New Ground to the south. One slipway (Slip No.1 of 1774) survives unaltered from this period: a rare survival. It is covered with a timber superstructure of 1814, a similarly rare and early survival of its type; indeed, only three such timber slip covers have survived in Britain, two of them at Devonport. (The second, of similar vintage, stands over the former No.5 Slip; in 1870 it was converted to house a scrieve board, for full-size drafting of ship designs).

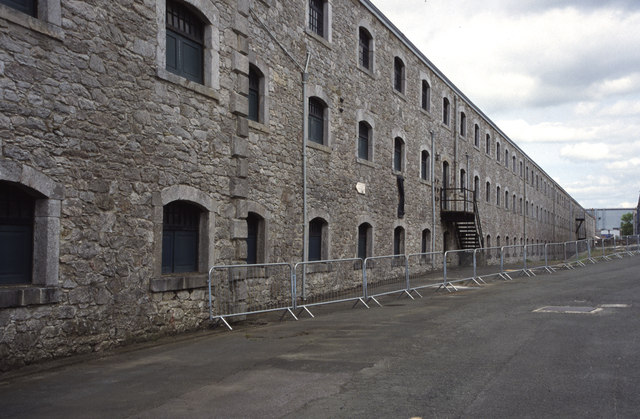
East Ropery (1763–71, rebuilt 1813–17)

Before the expansion could begin, a rocky hillside to the south had to be cut away; the rubble was used to reclaim the mudflats ready for building. To open up the site, the old ropehouse was demolished and a new rope-making complex built alongside the east perimeter wall of the expanded site (where it still survives in part, albeit rebuilt following a fire in 1812). Where the old ropehouse had stood a short canal known as the Camber was laid out, terminating in a boat basin with a boathouse. On the New Ground to the south a new smithery was constructed, in 1776, containing 48 forges; though subsequently rebuilt it too still stands, the earliest surviving smithery in any royal dockyard. Initially used for the manufacture of anchors and smaller metal items, it would later be expanded to fashion the iron braces with which wooden hulls and decks began to be strengthened; as such, it provided a hint of the huge change in manufacturing technology that would sweep the dockyards in the nineteenth century as sail began to make way for steam, and wood for iron and steel. In the space between the new slips and the new ropehouse, south of the boat pond and smithery, was a sizeable mast pond, flanked by mast-houses.

The most imposing building of this period was a double-quadrangular storehouse of 1761 (probably designed by Thomas Slade); replacing the 17th-century Great Storehouse, it also incorporated a new rigging house and sail loft. It remained in use until it was destroyed in the Plymouth Blitz. The same fate befell several other buildings of the 18th and early 19th century, including a long and prominent pedimented workshop with a central clocktower, built to accommodate a range of woodworkers and craftsmen, and an adjacent pedimented block containing the dockyard offices, as well as Edward Holl's replacement Dockyard Church of 1814.

===== Later changes =====
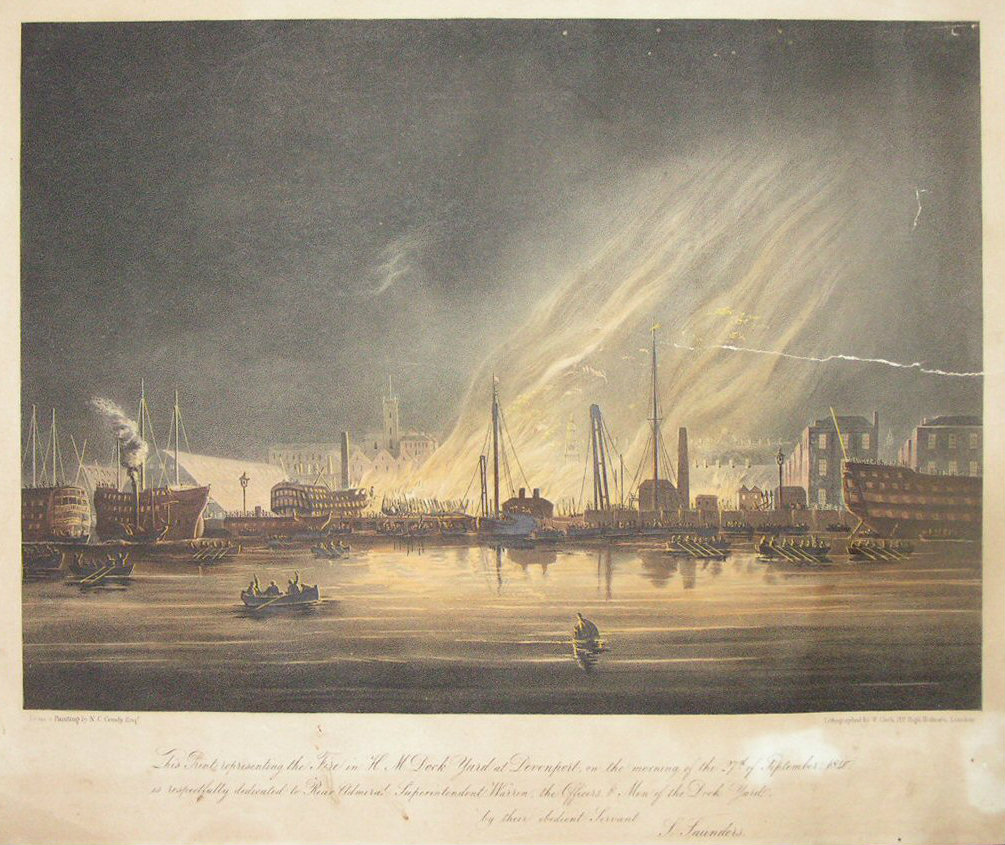
The Fire on the morning of 27 September 1840, by W. Clerk, after Nicholas Condy, which threatened to destroy the dockyard

The dockyard suffered severe damage in a large-scale fire on 25 September 1840, which started in the North Dock on HMS Talavera. Talavera and Imogene were completely gutted; the fire threatened HMS Minden, and spread to nearby buildings and equipment. Estimates for the damage were put at £150,000 in the values of the day, and would have totalled £500,000 had the fire not been contained by demolishing several surrounding buildings.

The South Yard continued to be upgraded to keep abreast of changes in shipbuilding technology. The docks and slips were expanded and extended at various points in the 19th century, with the double dock being reconfigured to form a single dock (No. 2 Dock) in 1860. At the end of the century the mast ponds were filled in to provide room for a new and very much larger No. 3 Slip, designed for the construction of dreadnoughts. Machine shops and plank stores were also put in place alongside. In 1912 the new No. 3 Slip was further extended in length, from 520 to 752 ft (158 to 229 m), ready for the building of the superdreadnought HMS Warspite. Meanwhile the 18th-century No. 1 Slip was converted into a patent slip for the repair of small craft, and in 1909 No. 2 Slip was made into a shallow dock for torpedo boats.

The South Yard was drastically impacted by aerial bombardment during the Second World War: by the end of 1942, 85% of its buildings had been either heavily damaged or destroyed.

==== Morice Yard (New Gun Wharf) ====
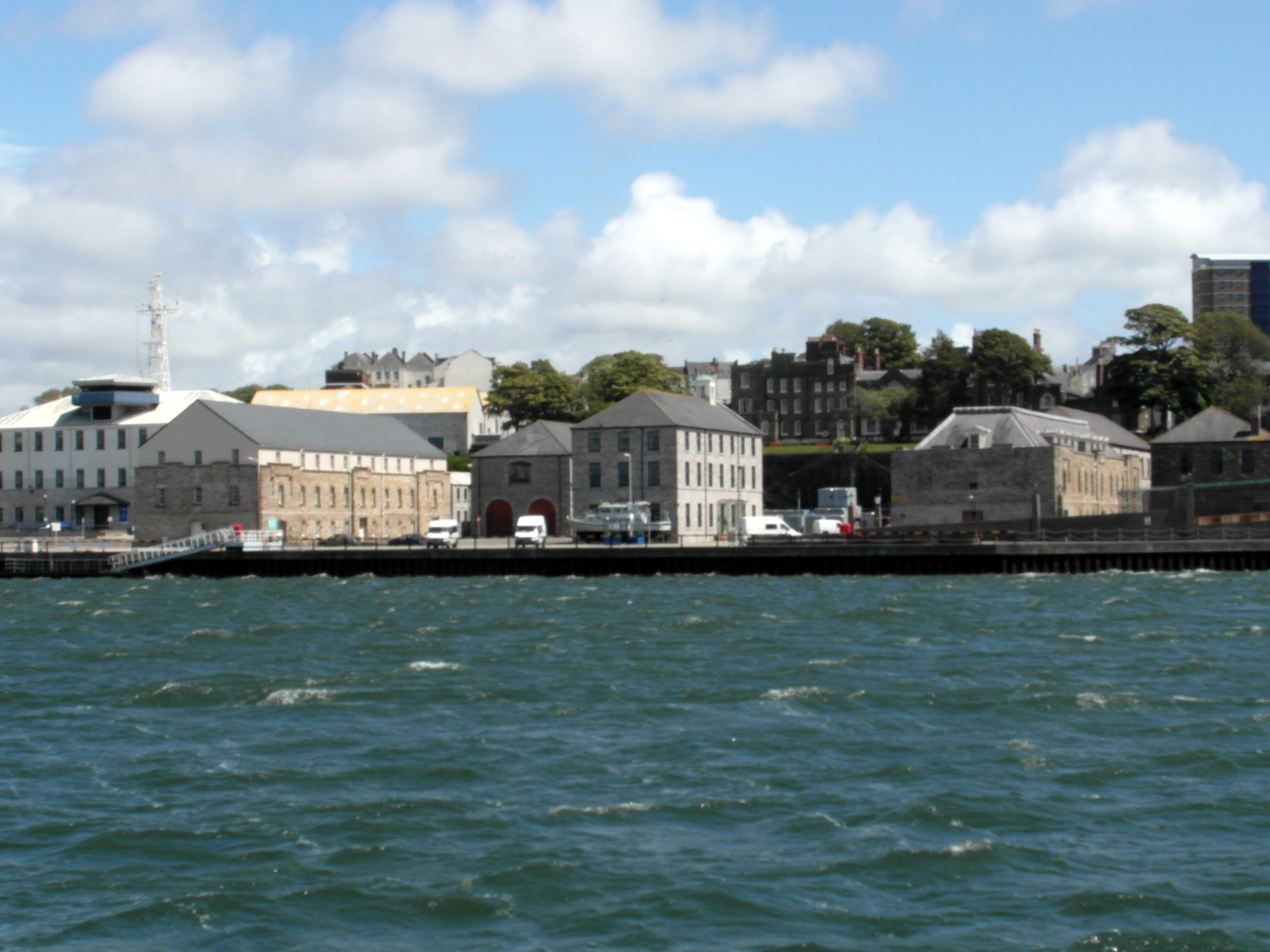
Morice Yard viewed from the water: (l-r) No.4 Store, No.6 Sail Loft, No.5 Colour Loft, Officers' Terrace, No.3 Store, No.2 Store.

Provision of ships' armaments was not the responsibility of the Navy but of the independent Board of Ordnance, which already had a wharf and storage facility in the Mount Wise area of Plymouth. This, however, began to prove insufficient and in 1719 the board established a new gun wharf on land leased from one Sir Nicholas Morice, immediately to the north of the established Dockyard. The Morice Yard was a self-contained establishment with its own complex of workshops, workers, officers, offices and storehouses. Gunpowder was stored on site, which began to be a cause for concern among local residents (as was the older store in the Royal Citadel within the city of Plymouth); so new gunpowder magazines were built further to the north, at Keyham, in the 1770s. (In the mid-19th century, to make room for the dockyard's expansion into Keyham, the gunpowder magazines were relocated to Bull Point, north of Weston Mill Lake).

In 1855 the Board of Ordnance was abolished and the War Office then took over management of the Morice Yard. Morice Ordnance Yard remained independent from the dockyard until 1941, at which point it was integrated into the larger complex. In contrast to South Yard, which fared badly in the Blitz, most of the original buildings survive at Morice Yard, enclosed behind their contemporary boundary wall; over a dozen of these are listed. On higher ground behind the wharf itself is a contemporary terrace of houses for officers (1720), built from stone rubble excavated during the yard's construction.

Morice Yard remains part of the operational Naval Base; in 2022 it became the headquarters of Surface Fleet Command.

==== The Devonport Lines ====
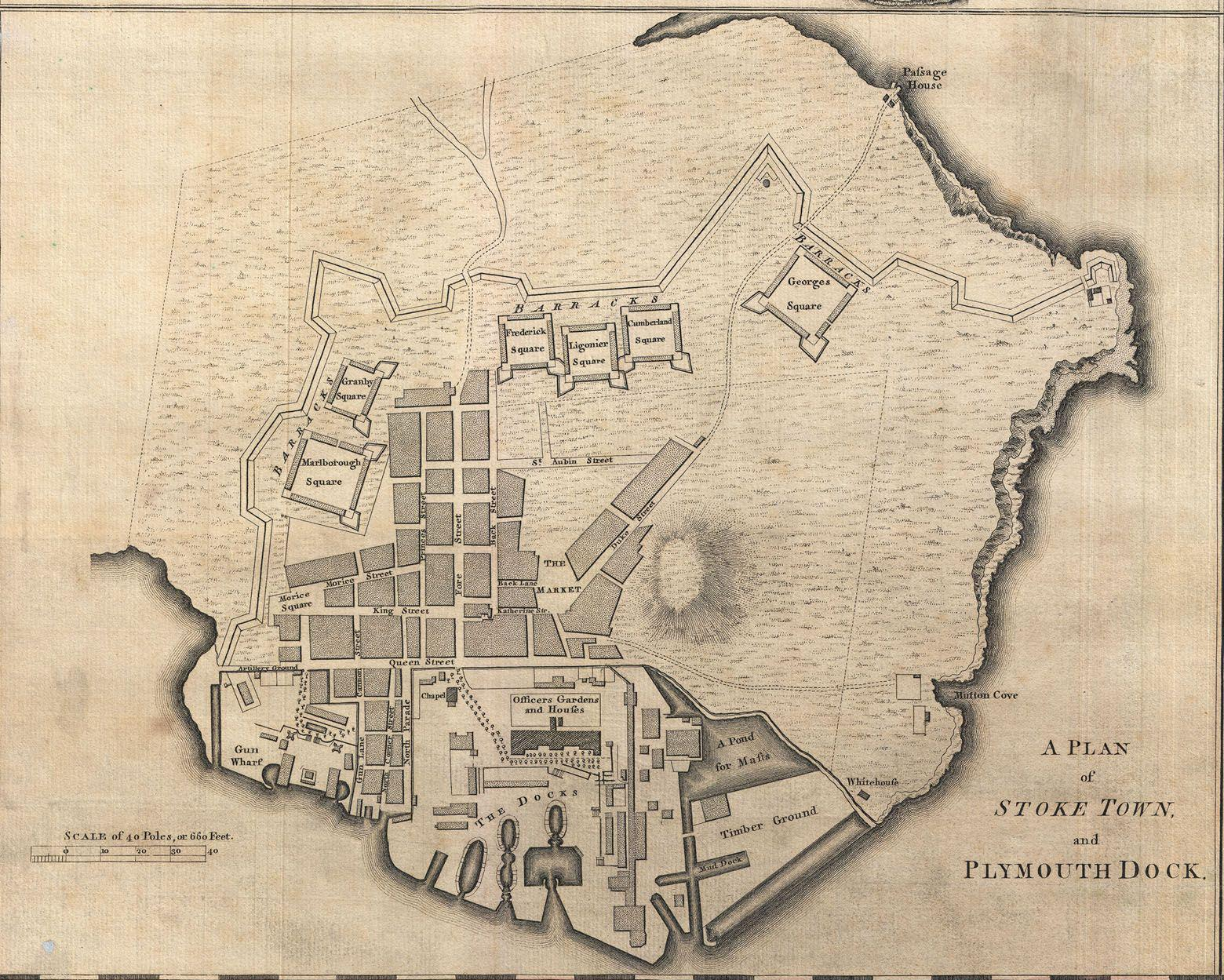
A Plan of Stoke Town and Plymouth Dock dated 1765: showing the line of fortification (with associated military barracks) surrounding the gun wharf, town and dockyard (north is to the left)

In 1758, the Plymouth and Portsmouth Fortifications Act provided the means to construct a permanent landward defence for the dockyard complex. The Lines round Plymouth Dock (later 'Devonport Lines') were a bastion fortification which consisted of an earthen rampart with a wide ditch and a glacis. The lines ran from Morice Yard on the River Tamar, enclosing the whole dockyard and town, finally meeting the river again at Stonehouse Pool, a total distance of 2,000 yards (1,800 metres). There were four bastions, Marlborough Bastion to the north, Granby Bastion to the north-east, Stoke Bastion to the east and George Bastion to the south east. There were originally two gates in the lines, the Stoke Barrier at the end of Fore Street and the Stonehouse Barrier. A third gate called New Passage was created in the 1780s, giving access to the Torpoint Ferry. After 1860, the fortifications were superseded by the Palmerston Forts around Plymouth and the land occupied by the lines was either sold or utilised by the dockyard. Also in 1860 the main dockyards' policing was transferred to the new dockyard divisions of the Metropolitan Police, in Devonport's case No. 3 Division, which remained in that role until 1934.

==== Keyham (the North Yard) ====
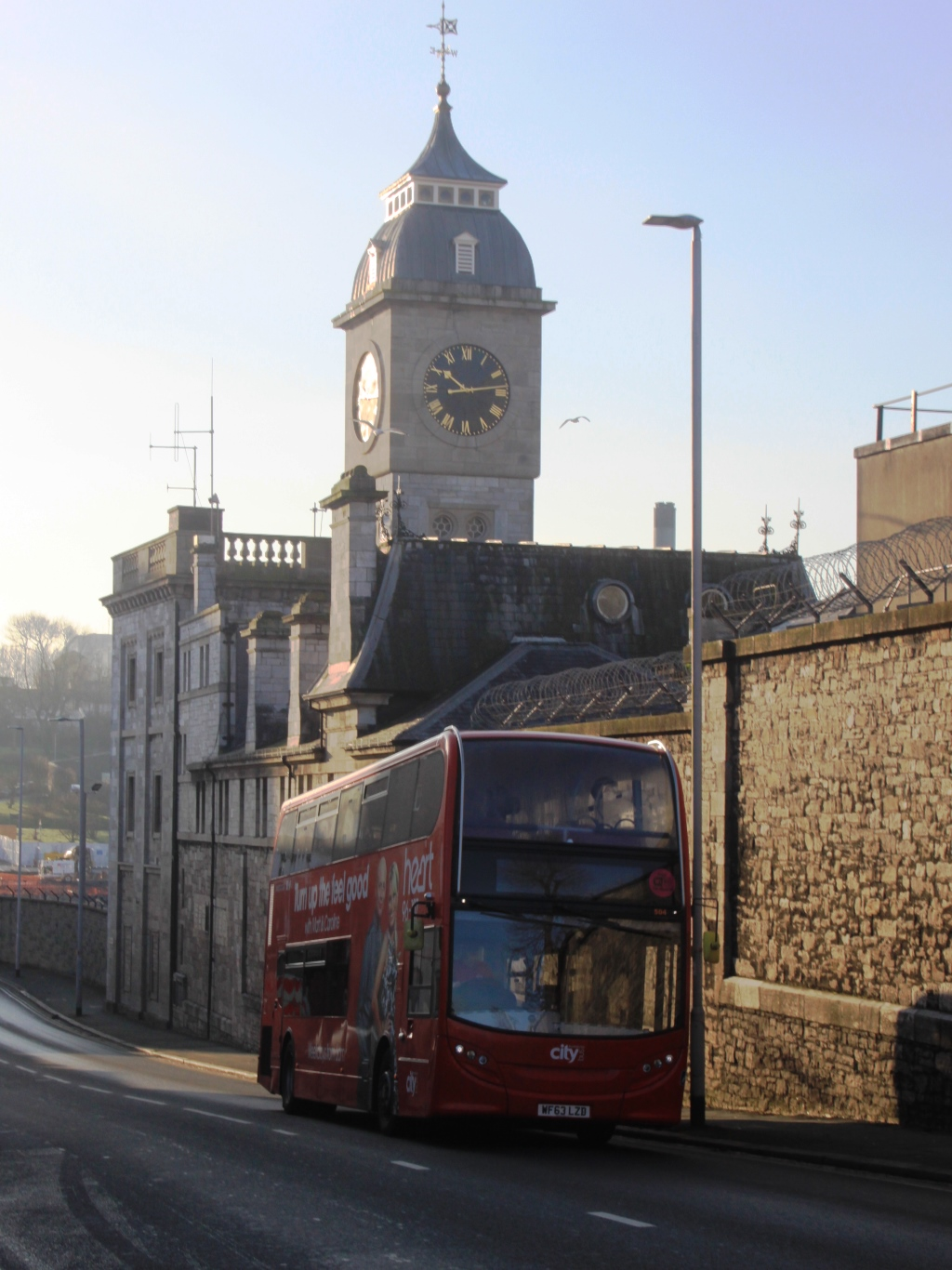
Clock tower and police office (formerly one of a pair flanking the gate to Keyham Steam Yard)

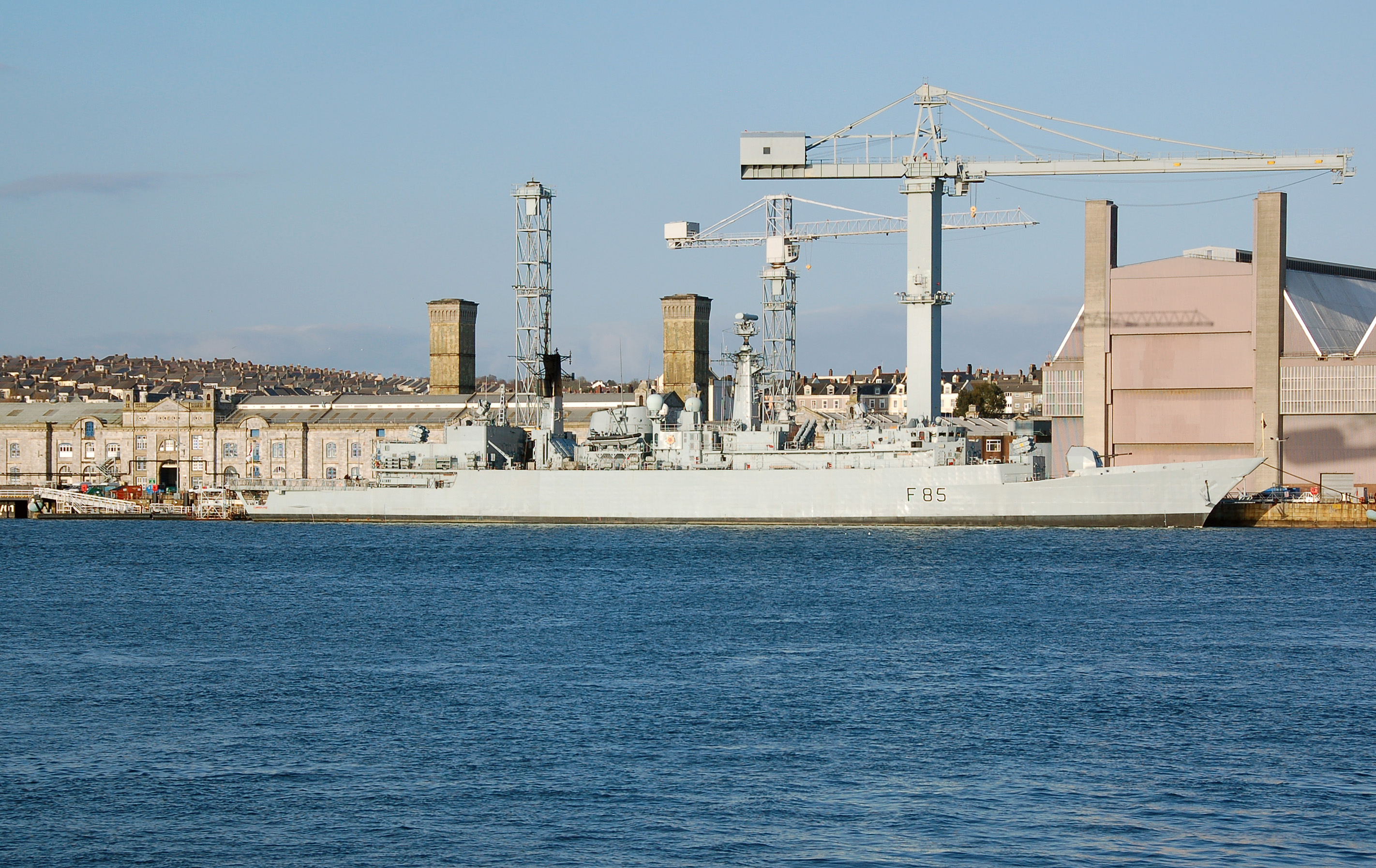
HMS Cumberland alongside the wharf in front of the Quadrangle Building (left) and a covered dry dock, part of the Frigate Refit Complex (right)

In the mid-nineteenth century, all royal dockyards faced the challenge of responding to the advent first of steam power and then metal hulls. Those unable to expand were closed; the rest underwent a transformation through growth and mechanisation. At Devonport, in 1864, a separate, purpose-built steam yard was opened on a self-contained site at Keyham, a little to the north of the Morice Yard (and a tunnel was built linking the new yard with the old). A pair of basins (8–9 acres each) were constructed: No. 2 Basin gave access to three large dry docks, while No. 3 Basin was the frontispiece to a huge integrated manufacturing complex. This 'steam factory' became known as the Quadrangle: it housed foundries, forges, pattern shops, boilermakers and all manner of specialized workshops. Two stationary steam engines drove line shafts and heavy machinery, and the multiple flues were drawn by a pair of prominent chimneys. The building still stands, and is Grade I listed; architectural detailing was by Sir Charles Barry. English Heritage calls it 'one of the most remarkable engineering buildings in the country'.

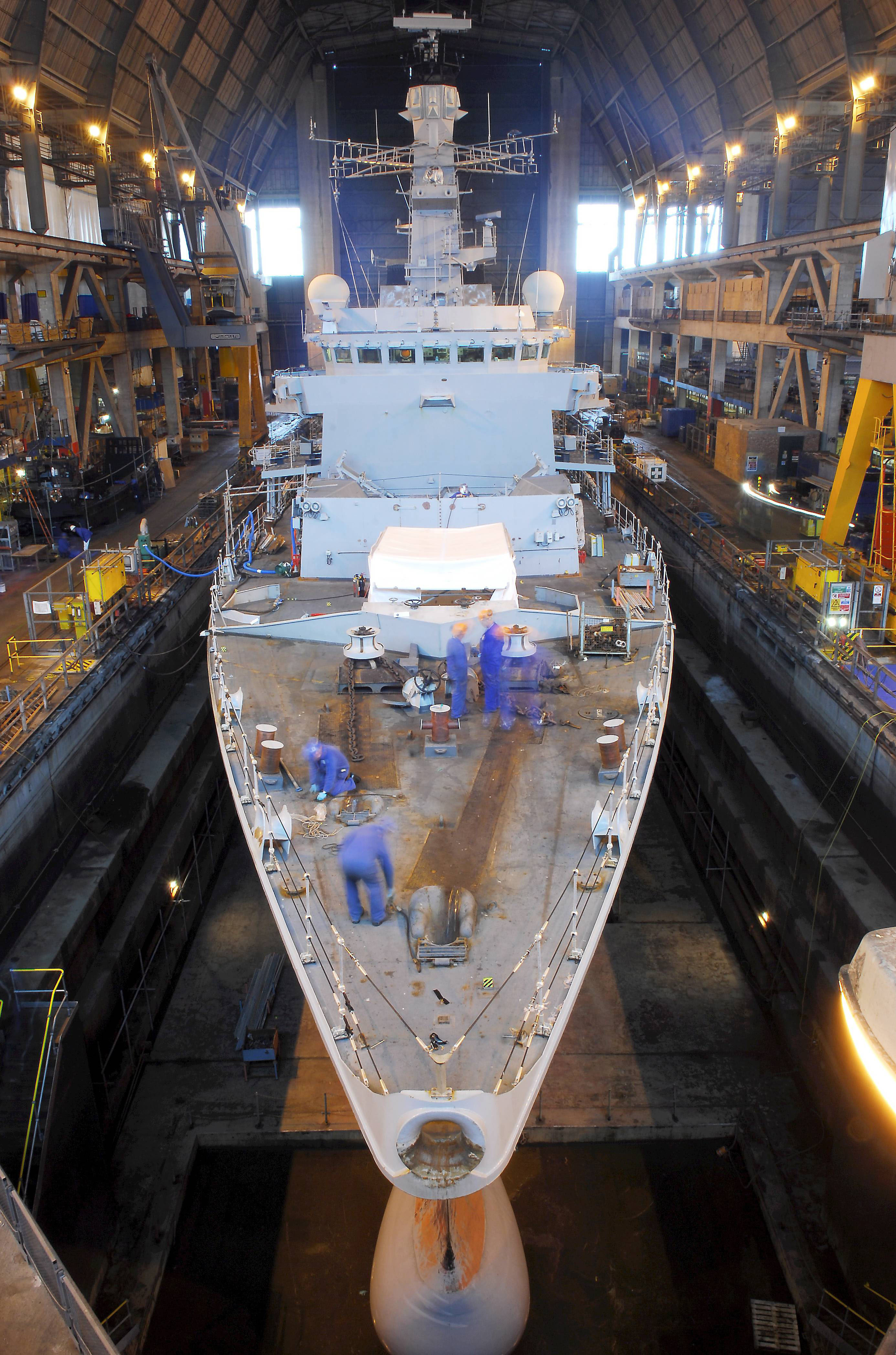
HMS Westminster inside the Frigate Refit Complex, 2009

In the 1970s the three dry docks (Nos. 5, 6 and 7) were rebuilt, expanded and covered over to serve as an up-to-date Frigate Refit Complex. They remain very much in use, together with the adjacent Quadrangle building, which (while extensively modernised within its original walls and roofs) continues to fulfil its original purpose, manufacturing items for ships in refit.

===== RNEC Keyham =====
In 1880 a Royal Naval Engineering College was established at Keyham, housed in a new building just outside the dockyard wall alongside the Quadrangle where students (who joined at 15 years of age) gained hands-on experience of the latest naval engineering techniques. (The Engineering College moved to nearby Manadon in 1958; the Jacobethan-style building then went on to house the Dockyard Technical College for a time, but was demolished in 1985.)

===== The Naval barracks =====
Until the late nineteenth century, sailors whose ships were being repaired or refitted, or who were awaiting allocation to a vessel, were accommodated in floating hulks. Construction of an onshore barracks, just north-east of the North Yard, was completed in 1889, with the barracks being named "HMS Vivid", after the base ship of the same name. It could accommodate 2,500 sailors and officers, and the first personnel moved in during June of that year. The barracks were renamed HMS Drake on 1 January 1934; in the early 21st century the barracks area remained part of HMNB Devonport, but was re-designated the Fleet Accommodation Centre. It remains in Ministry of Defence ownership.

==== Keyham Extension ====
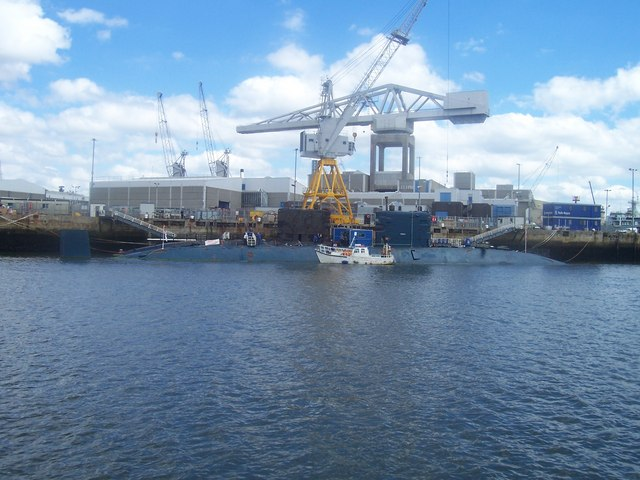
The 80-ton crane, a landmark of the Submarine Refit Centre since 1977, was dismantled in 2008.

In 1895 the decision was taken to expand the Keyham Steam Yard to accommodate the increasing size of modern warships. By 1907 Keyham, now renamed the North Yard, had more than doubled in size with the addition of No. 4 and No. 5 Basins (of 10 and 35 acres respectively), linked by a very large lock-cum-dock (the North Lock), 730 ft in length, alongside three more dry docks of a similar size (Nos. 8, 9 and 10), able to "accommodate ships larger than any war-vessel yet constructed". At the northernmost end of the site the north-west promontory, together with the wharves facing on to Weston Mill Lake, functioned as a vast coaling yard for the steam-powered fleet.

In the 1970s a new Fleet Maintenance Base was built at the North West Corner of the North Yard; opened in 1978, it was commissioned as HMS Defiance (remaining so until 1994, when it was amalgamated into HMS Drake). At the same time, a new Submarine Refit Complex was created, alongside the Fleet Maintenance Base, in the north-west corner of No. 5 Basin. It opened in 1981. Within it, two new dry docks were created (Nos. 14 and 15) for nuclear-powered fleet submarines, and between them an 80-ton cantilever crane, one of the largest in western Europe, was installed to lift nuclear cores from submarines for maintenance and refuelling. As part of the same works, the North Lock (at the opposite end of the basin) was divided to form two submarine docks (Nos. 11 and 12).

In 1993 the Submarine Refit Centre was upgraded following the announcement that Devonport was to become the Royal Navy's only nuclear refit yard; among other things Nos. 9 and 10 dry docks were strengthened and reconfigured so as to be able to accommodate the much larger Vanguard-class submarines, which entered into service from that year; the work was completed by Carillion in 2002.

In 2011 the MOD sold the freehold of much of the North Yard to the Dockyard operator, Babcock; the site includes Basins No. 2 and No. 5 and their adjoining dry docks, together with the land between and around them (containing six listed buildings and structures, including the Grade I listed Quadrangle).

===== Weston Mill Lake =====
To the north of No. 5 Basin, land around Weston Mill Lake was reclaimed in the 1970s and the following decade the area (including the former coaling wharves) was repurposed to provide frigate berths for the Type 22 fleet. It is now where the Navy's amphibious warfare ships are based. In 2013 a new Royal Marines base, RM Tamar, was opened alongside; as well as serving as headquarters for 1 Assault Group Royal Marines, it can accommodate marines, alongside their ships, prior to deployment. Weston Mill Lake and its surrounding wharves remain in MOD ownership.

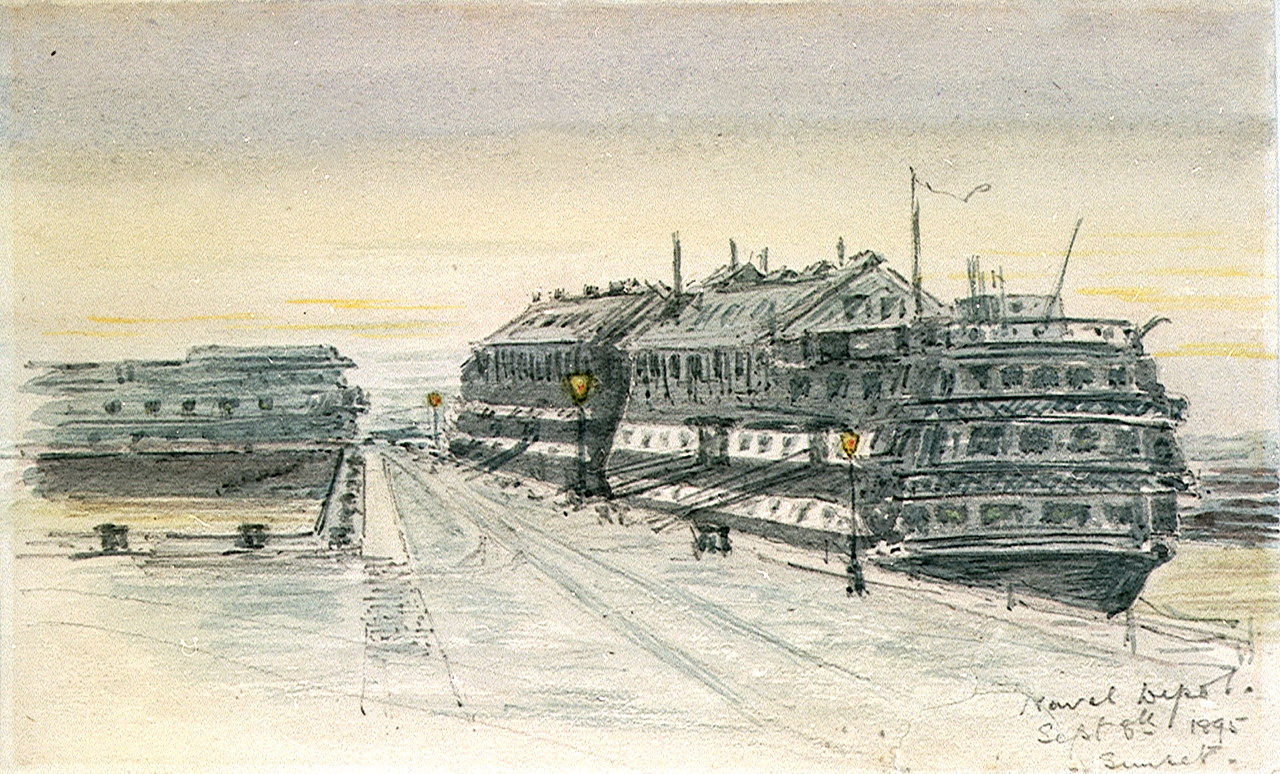
Hulks at Devonport 8 September 1895

==== Goschen Yard and post-war development ====
The civilian streets around Devonport (like the dockyard itself) were heavily bombed during the Plymouth blitz. Post-war reconstruction was mainly focused on Plymouth itself. Several damaged streets in the vicinity of the dockyard were not rebuilt, but instead brought within Admiralty ownership to allow for future dockyard expansion. An area around Goschen Street, to the east of the North Yard, became known as the Goschen Yard: a factory and workshops were built on the site (which is now owned by Babcock); there was also an apprentice training centre (which later became part of City College Plymouth).

In 2005 a sizeable area of the historic town centre of Devonport, which had been annexed after the war and was known as the South Yard Enclave, was released from MOD ownership. The area, west of Chapel Street and north of Duke Street, had since 1956 been enclosed behind a perimeter wall and used as a naval stores yard; it has since been redeveloped with housing and other amenities. A few surviving buildings have been restored, most notably the Grade II listed Victorian former Market Hall (which had been used as a sale store for the Naval Supply and Transport Service).

== Heritage ==
=== Listed buildings ===
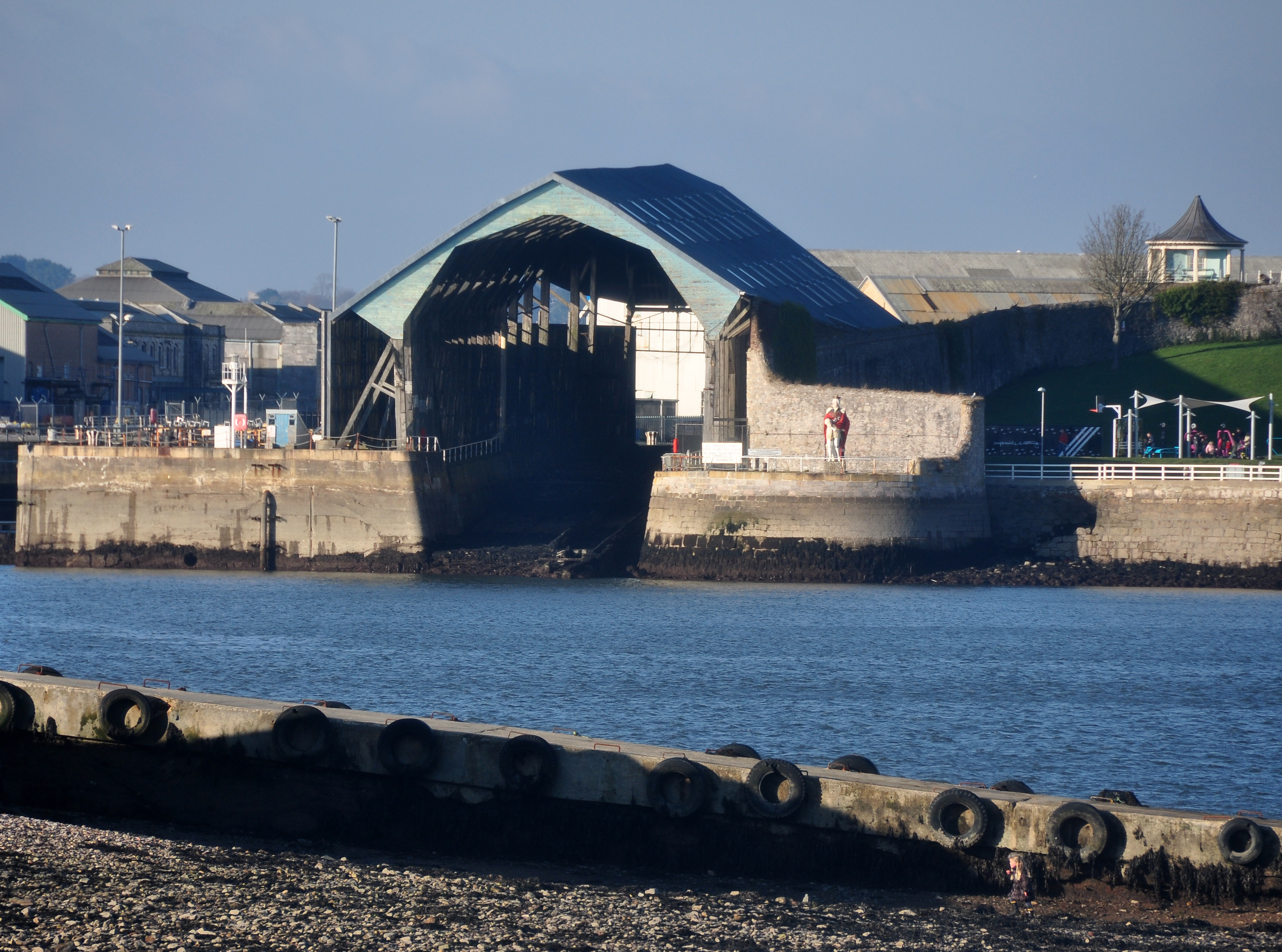
Listed buildings in the South Yard, including South Sawmills and Smithery (left), No. 1 Slip (centre) and King's Hill Gazebo (top right)

Despite significant damage during the blitz, the South Yard still contains four scheduled monuments and over thirty listed buildings and structures (though some of these have been allowed to fall into a derelict state in recent years: the 18th-century South Sawmills and South Smithery are both on the Heritage at Risk Register).

A number of these listed buildings and scheduled ancient monuments are now owned by Princess Yachts, which took over the southern part of the site in 2012, most notably the Grade I listed East Ropery (together with several other 18th-century buildings and structures associated with rope-making in the Yard), the covered slip (No. 1 Slip) and the 'King's Hill Gazebo', built to commemorate a visit by King George III. Others are in the Oceansgate area, including Nos. 2, 3 and 4 dry docks, and seven buildings (two of which are currently occupied by the Naval Heritage Centre: the former Dockyard Fire Station and the 18th-century Pay Office).

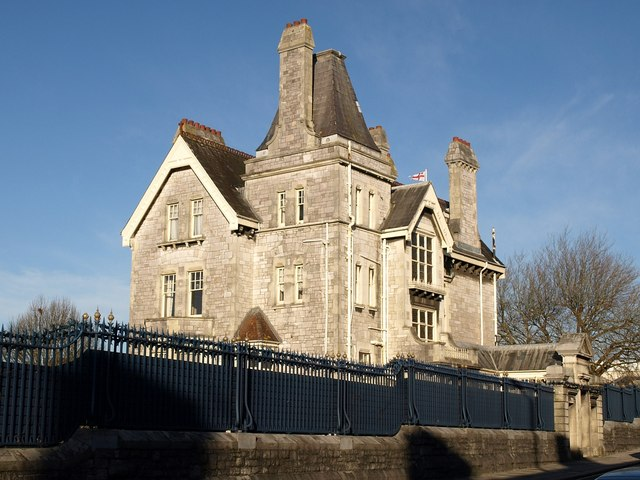
Drake House (the Grade II listed Commodore's residence, HMS Drake)

Other parts of the yard also contain significant collections of listed buildings and structures: there are fourteen in the Barracks area (HMS Drake), thirteen in the Morice Yard; and seven in the North Yard (including the Grade I listed Quadrangle workshops) which are now in the care and custody of Babcock International.

=== Devonport Naval Heritage Centre ===
Devonport Naval Heritage Centre is a maritime museum located within the Oceansgate area of Devonport's historic South Yard. Run by volunteers, it is currently (as of 2023) open on Wednesdays and occasional Saturdays, March-October. The nuclear-powered submarine HMS Courageous, used in the Falklands War, is preserved in North Yard as a museum ship, managed by the Heritage Centre (although it is currently closed to visitors until further notice). In 2018 the National Museum of the Royal Navy announced a 12-year plan to establish a 'full-time visitor attraction' in Devonport, based around a new museum (to be located in the surviving portion of the Officers' Terrace, the oldest building in any Royal Dockyard) and the decommissioned HMS Courageous (which would be preserved in the historic No. 1 Dry Dock).

== Nuclear safety ==
Devonport has been the site of a number of leaks of nuclear waste associated with the nuclear submarines based there.

- November 2002: "Ten litres of radioactive coolant leaked from HMS Vanguard".
- October 2005: "Previous reported radioactive spills at the dockyard include one in October 2005, when it was confirmed 10 litres of water leaked out as the main reactor circuit of HMS Victorious was being cleaned to reduce radiation."
- November 2008: "The Royal Navy has confirmed up to 280 litres of water, likely to have been contaminated with tritium, poured from a burst hose as it was being pumped from the submarine in the early hours of Friday."
- March 2009: "On 25 March radioactive water escaped from HMS Turbulent while the reactor's discharge system was being flushed at the Devonport naval dockyard".

The nuclear submarine refit base was put into special measures in 2013 by the Office for Nuclear Regulation (ONR). Safety concerns on ageing facilities, stretched resources and increasing demand are blamed for the measures. A further report in 2022 looked at areas of improvement so that the base could move out of enhanced monitoring "at the earliest opportunity.

== Nickname ==
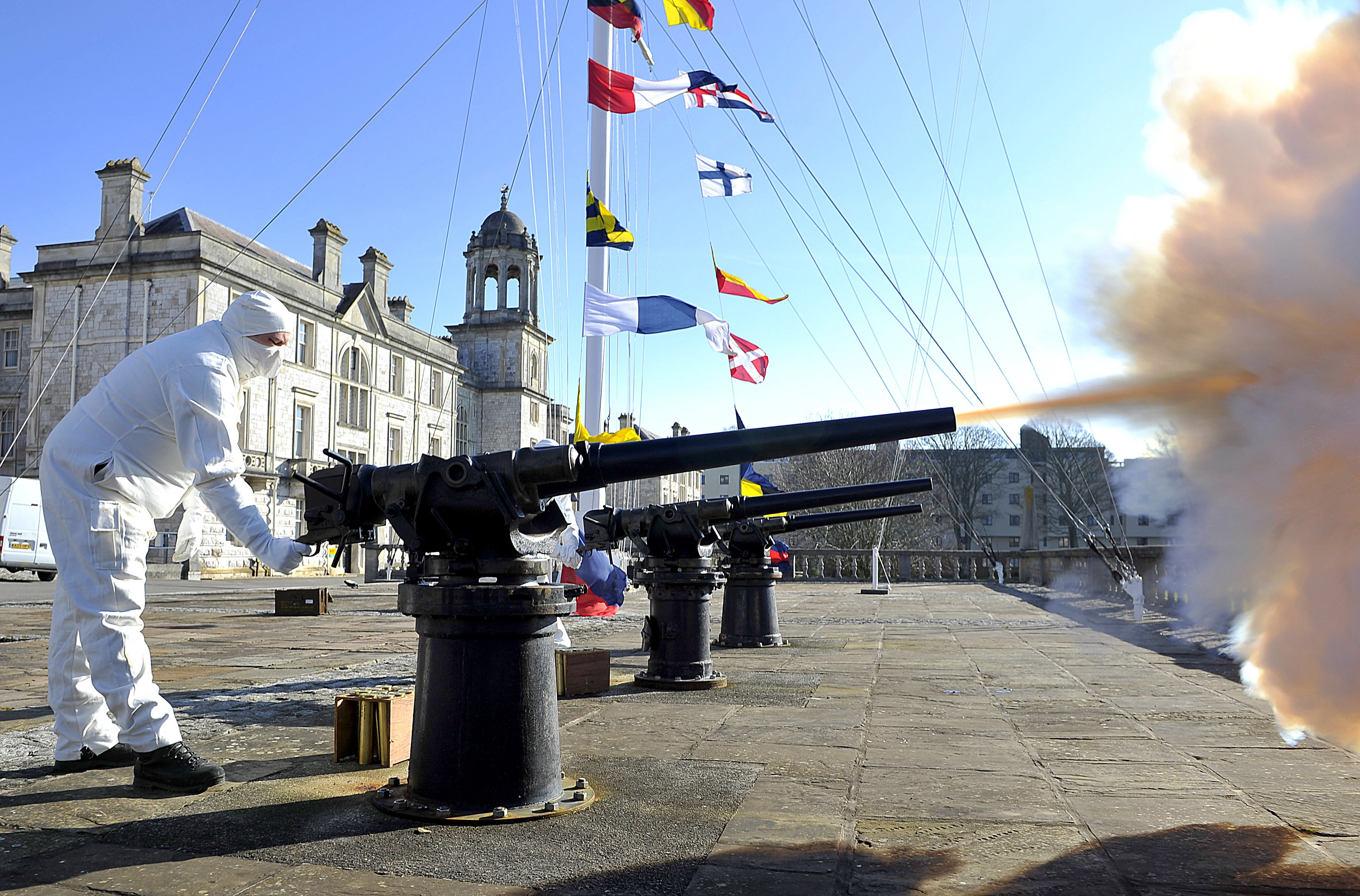
Firing of a gun salute from the battery at HMS Drake

The Naval base at Devonport is still nicknamed "Guzz" (or, sometimes, "Guz") by sailors and marines. One suggestion is that this originates from the word guzzle (to eat or drink greedily), which is likely to refer to the eating of cream teas, a West Country delicacy and, therefore, one with strong connections to the area around Plymouth. Another explanation advanced is that "GUZZ" was the radio call sign for the nearby Admiralty wireless station (which was GZX) at Devil's Point, though this is disputed and has recently been disproved by reference to actual wireless telegraphy callsigns in existence over the past century.

Another explanation is that the name came from the Hindi word for a yard (36 inches), "guz", (also spelled "guzz", at the time) which entered the Oxford English Dictionary, and Royal Navy usage, in the late 19th century, as sailors used to regularly abbreviate "The Dockyard" to simply "The Yard", leading to the slang use of the Hindi word for the unit of measurement of the same name. The Plymouth Herald newspaper attempted to summarise the differing theories, but no firm conclusion was reached. Charles Causley referred to Guz in one of his poems, "Song of the Dying Gunner A.A.1", published in 1951.

"Tiddy oggy" is naval slang for a pasty and was once the nickname for a sailor born and bred in Devonport. The traditional shout of "Oggy Oggy Oggy" was used to cheer on the Devonport team in the Navy's field gun competition.

== Administration ==
=== Commissioners of the Navy ===
Up until 1832 the Plymouth Royal Dockyard, was administered by a Commissioner of the Navy on behalf of the Navy Board in London included:

==== Resident Commissioners Plymouth ====
- Captain Henry Greenhill (appointed 25 December 1691)
- Captain George St Lo (appointed 26 March 1695)
- Captain William Wright (appointed 1 May 1703)
- Captain Henry Greenhill (appointed February 1704)
- Captain William Wright (appointed 1 July 1708)
- Captain Richard Edwards (appointed 19 June 1711)
- Captain Sir William Jumper (appointed 12 November 1714)
- Captain Thomas Swanton (appointed 30 March 1715)
- Captain Francis Dove (appointed 23 July 1716)
- Captain Sir Nicholas Trevanion (appointed 22 April 1726)
- Captain Matthew Morris (appointed 9 December 1737)
- Captain Philip Vanbrugh (appointed 8 January 1738)
- Captain Sir Frederick Rogers (appointed 3 October 1753)
- Mr Edward Le Cras (appointed December 1782)
- Captain Sir John Laforey (appointed 6 May 1784)
- Captain Robert Fanshawe (appointed 13 November 1789)
- Captain William Shield (appointed 12 December 1815 – 1822)

==== Resident Commissioners Devonport ====
- Captain William Shield, 1823–1828
- Captain Charles B H Ross, appointed 13 March 1829.

By An Order in Council dated 27 June 1832 the role of the commissioner was replaced by an admiral-superintendent.

=== Admiral Superintendents of the yard ===
In 1832 the Navy Board was abolished, everything except the gun wharves were brought under the direct control of the Admiralty. A serving Royal Navy officer, usually of rear-admiral rank, was appointed as admiral-superintendent of the dockyard; however, the post was sometimes held by a commodore-superintendent or even a vice-admiral. They were responsible for all the civilian support services operated by the dockyard departments.

Included:

- Rear-Admiral Sir Samuel Pym (appointed 16 December 1841)
- Rear-Admiral Sir John Louis (appointed 16 December 1846)
- Commodore Lord John Hay (appointed 9 February 1850)
- Commodore Michael Seymour (appointed 8 September 1851)
- Rear-Admiral Hon. Montagu Stopford (appointed 21 March 1854)
- Rear-Admiral Henry Eden (appointed 4 August 1854)
- Rear-Admiral Michael Seymour (appointed 12 December 1854)
- Rear-Admiral Sir James Hanway Plumridge (appointed 19 February 1855)
- Rear-Admiral Sir Thomas Sabine Pasley (appointed 4 December 1857)
- Rear-Admiral Thomas Matthew Charles Symonds (appointed 1 December 1862)
- Vice-Admiral Hon. James Robert Drummond (appointed 24 April 1866)
- Rear-Admiral William Houston Stewart (appointed 5 June 1870)
- Vice-Admiral Sir William King-Hall (appointed 20 November 1871)
- Rear-Admiral William Charles Chamberlain (appointed 5 August 1875)
- Rear-Admiral George Ommanney Willes (appointed 1 May 1876)
- Rear-Admiral Charles Webley Hope (appointed 1 February 1879)
- Rear-Admiral Charles Thomas Curme (appointed 20 February 1880)
- Rear-Admiral John Crawford Wilson (appointed 23 February 1885)
- Vice-Admiral Henry Duncan Grant (appointed 10 July 1885)
- Vice-Admiral Sir Walter James Hunt-Grubbe (appointed 1 August 1888)
- Rear-Admiral Sir Robert Henry More Molyneux (appointed 4 August 1891)
- Rear-Admiral Edmund John Church (appointed 7 August 1894)
- Rear-Admiral Henry John Carr (appointed 3 November 1896)
- Rear-Admiral Sir Thomas Sturges Jackson (appointed 7 July 1899 – made Vice Admiral while in post, 1902)
- Rear-Admiral William Hanam Henderson (appointed 11 July 1902 – made Vice-Admiral while in post, 1904)
- Vice-Admiral Charles James Barlow (appointed 31 March 1906)
- Vice-Admiral Charles Henry Cross (appointed 31 March 1908)
- Vice-Admiral Robert Henry Simpson Stokes (appointed 4 October 1910)
- Rear-Admiral Godfrey Harry Brydges Mundy (appointed 11 December 1913)
- Rear-Admiral Sir Arthur Henniker-Hughan (appointed 18 December 1916)
- Rear-Admiral Edwin Veale Underhill (appointed 1 September 1919)
- Rear-Admiral Hugh Lindsay Patrick Heard (appointed 20 September 1922)
- Vice-Admiral Louis Charles Stirling Woollcombe (appointed 1 November 1926)
- Vice-Admiral Oliver Backhouse (appointed 1 March 1927 and re-appointed 10 October 1929)
- Vice-Admiral Harold Owen Reinold (appointed 2 March 1931)
- Vice-Admiral Arthur Lionel Snagge (appointed 1935)
- Vice-Admiral Arthur Ninian Dowding (appointed 27 September 1938)
- Vice-Admiral Randolph Stewart Gresham Nicholson (appointed 18 December 1945)
- Admiral Philip King Enright (appointed 6 February 1950)
- Vice-Admiral Leslie Newton Brownfield (appointed 31 March 1954)
- Vice-Admiral Lancelot Arthur Babington Peile (appointed November 1957)
- Vice-Admiral George David Archibald Gregory (appointed 29 September 1960)
- Rear-Admiral A J Cawthra (appointed 2 April 1964)
- Rear-Admiral Denis Bryan Harvey "Dick" Wildish (appointed 26 October 1966 until May 1970)

On 30 December 1970, Vice-Admiral J R McKaig was appointed as Port Admiral, His Majesty's Naval Base, Devonport, and Flag Officer, Plymouth. On 5 September 1971, all Flag Officers of the Royal Navy holding positions of Admiral Superintendents at Royal Dockyards were restyled as Port Admirals.

=== Port Admiral Devonport and Flag Officer Plymouth ===
Post holders included:

- Vice-Admiral Sir Rae McKaig (December 1970 – March 1973)
- Vice-Admiral Sir Arthur Power (March 1973 – February 1975)
- Vice-Admiral Sir Gordon Tait (February 1975 – January 1977)
- Vice-Admiral Sir John Forbes (January 1977 – January 1979)
- Vice-Admiral Sir Peter Berger (January 1979 – February 1981)
- Vice-Admiral Sir Simon Cassels (February 1981 – September 1982)
- Vice-Admiral Sir David Brown (September 1982 – 1985)
- Vice-Admiral Sir Robert Gerken (September 1985 – March 1987)
- Vice-Admiral Sir John Webster (March 1987 – April 1990)
- Vice-Admiral Sir Alan Grose (April 1990 – September 1992)
- Vice-Admiral Sir Roy Newman (September 1992 – 1996)

== Associated establishments nearby ==
Several establishments were set up in the vicinity of Devonport and Plymouth in direct relationship either to the Royal Dockyard or to Plymouth's use as a base for the Fleet, including:

- Royal Citadel, Plymouth (1665), built to defend the harbour and anchorage, currently the base of 29 Commando Regiment, Royal Artillery
- Dockyard defences, including Devonport Lines (1758) and the later Palmerston Forts, Plymouth
- Royal Naval Hospital, Stonehouse (1760, closed 1995)
- Stonehouse Barracks (1779), headquarters of UK Commando Force, Royal Marines
- Admiralty House, Mount Wise (1789), former headquarters of the Commander-in-Chief, Plymouth (together with the Second World War Combined Military Headquarters (later Plymouth Maritime Headquarters) it was decommissioned in 2004).
- Plymouth Breakwater (1812)
- Royal William Victualling Yard (1835) built by the Victualling Commissioners in nearby Stonehouse for supplying the Royal Navy (closed 1992 and converted into housing)
- HMS Raleigh, RN basic training establishment, across the Hamoaze at Torpoint, Cornwall
- RM Turnchapel, a former Royal Marines military installation (decommissioned 2014)

== Bibliography ==
- Duffy, Michael (2019). "William James's Record of the Work Done at Devonport Yard During the War by the Engineering Department". In MacDougall, Philip (ed.). British Dockyards in the First World War. Transactions of the Naval Dockyards Society. Vol. 12: Conference held at the National Maritime Museum, Greenwich, March 2014. Southwick, UK: The Naval Dockyards Society. pp. 123–139. ISBN 978-1-9164797-1-5.
