= Admiral Stevens =

Admiral Stevens may refer to:

- John Stevens (Royal Navy officer) (1900–1989), British Royal Navy vice admiral
- Robert Stevens (Royal Navy officer) (born 1948), British Royal Navy rear admiral
- Thomas H. Stevens Jr. (1819–1896), U.S. Navy rear admiral
