= Veryan (disambiguation) =

Veryan is a village and parish in Cornwall, England, UK.

Veryan may also refer to:

- Nora Veryán (1929–1998), a Mexican film actress
- Patricia Veryan, a writer of historical romance fiction
- Veryan Pappin (born 1958), a Scottish field hockey player
- Veryan Weston, a pianist

== See also ==
- Veryan Bay, a bay on the south coast of Cornwall
- HMS Veryan Bay (K651), a ship of the Royal Navy
