= Admiral Norris (disambiguation) =

John Norris (Royal Navy officer) (1670/71–1749) was a Royal Navy Admiral of the Fleet. Admiral Norris may also refer to:

- Charles Norris (Royal Navy officer) (1900–1989), British Royal Navy vice admiral
- David Norris (Royal Navy officer) (1875–1937), British Royal Navy admiral
