= John Cuthbert (Royal Navy officer) =

Royal Navy Vice Admiral (1902–1987)

Vice-Admiral Sir John Cuthbert KBE CB DL
- Born: 9 April 1902
- Died: 7 December 1987 (aged 85)
- Military career
- Allegiance: United Kingdom
- Branch: Royal Navy
- Service years: 1919–1958
- Rank: Vice-Admiral
- Commands: HMS Glasgow; HMS Ajax; HMS Vengeance; Flotillas for the Home Fleet; Scotland and Northern Ireland; South Atlantic Station
- Conflicts: World War II
- Awards: Knight Commander of the Order of the British Empire; Companion of the Order of the Bath

Vice-Admiral Sir John Wilson Cuthbert KBE CB DL (9 April 1902 – 7 December 1987) was a Royal Navy officer who became Flag Officer, Scotland and Northern Ireland.

== Naval career ==
Cuthbert joined the Royal Navy as a midshipman in 1919. He served in World War II as Commanding Officer of the cruiser HMS Glasgow, as a member of the Joint Planning Staff at the British Admiralty and then as Commanding Officer of the cruiser HMS Ajax. After the War he was appointed Commanding Officer of the aircraft carrier HMS Vengeance and then Deputy Controller at the Admiralty. He was made Flag Officer Flotillas for the Home Fleet in 1953 and Admiral commanding the Reserves in 1955 before becoming Flag Officer, Scotland and Northern Ireland in 1956 and retiring in 1958.

He lived at Hurstbourne Tarrant in Hampshire and was a deputy lieutenant of Hampshire.

== Family ==
In 1928 he married Betty Wake Shorrock; they had no children.

Military offices
| Preceded by Sir Geoffrey Robson | Flag Officer, Scotland and Northern Ireland; 1956–1958 | Succeeded by David Luce |
