= Geoffrey Robson =

Royal Navy Vice Admiral (1902–1989)

Vice-Admiral Sir Geoffrey Robson KBE CB DSO* DSC
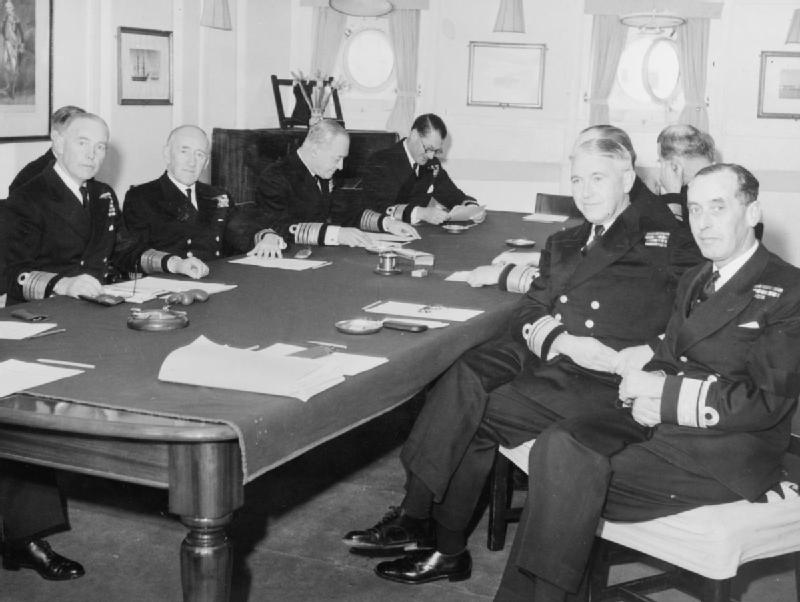
- Rear Admiral Robson, fourth from left, at a conference with First Sea Lord, Admiral Sir Rhoderick McGrigor, and other admirals aboard HMS Liverpool in 1952
- Born: 10 March 1902; Ceylon
- Died: 25 December 1989 (aged 87)
- Military career
- Allegiance: United Kingdom
- Branch: Royal Navy
- Service years: 1915–1958
- Rank: Vice-Admiral
- Commands: Commander-in-Chief, South Atlantic (1956–58); Flag Officer Scotland and Northern Ireland (1953–56); HMS Ganges (1948–50); HMS Superb (1945–47); 26th Destroyer Flotilla (1944); HMS Hardy (1943); HMS Kandahar (1939–41); HMS Wren (1935–36); HMS Rowena (1934)
- Conflicts: First World War; Second World War
- Awards: Knight Commander of the Order of the British Empire; Companion of the Order of the Bath; Distinguished Service Order & Bar; Distinguished Service Cross; Mentioned in Despatches (3); Order of St. Olav (Norway)

Vice-Admiral Sir William Geoffrey Arthur Robson, KBE, CB, DSO & Bar, DSC (10 March 1902 – 25 December 1989) was a Royal Navy officer whose last Service appointment was Commander-in-Chief, South Atlantic.

== Naval career ==
Educated at the Royal Naval College, Osborne, and the Royal Naval College, Dartmouth, Robson joined the Royal Navy as a cadet in 1915 during the First World War and served as a midshipman on the battleship HMS Malaya. He commanded the destroyers HMS Rowena from 1934 and HMS Wren from 1935.

Robson also served during the Second World War, initially as Commander of the destroyer HMS Kandahar and then with combined operations from 1943 before commanding the 26th Destroyer Flotilla in 1944 and then Captain of Coastal Forces at The Nore in 1945.

After the War he was given command of the cruiser HMS Superb and then, from 1948, of the Royal Navy Training Establishment HMS Ganges. Robson was appointed President of the Admiralty Interview Board in 1950, Flag Officer (Flotillas) for the Home Fleet in 1951 and then Flag Officer Scotland and Northern Ireland in 1953. He went on to be Commander-in-Chief, South Atlantic in 1956.

He was made a Knight Commander of the Order of the British Empire in 1956.

At Freetown in early 1957, HMS Veryan Bay (K651) wore Vice-Admiral Robson's flag as Commander-in-Chief, South Atlantic. Veryan Bay proceeded to Plymouth, arriving on 11 March 1957, and was then paid-off.

Sir Geoffrey Robson retired in July 1958. In retirement he served as Lieutenant Governor and Commander-in-Chief of Guernsey from 1958 to 1964.

Military offices
Preceded by John Crombie	Flag Officer, Scotland and Northern Ireland; 1953–1956	Succeeded by Sir John Cuthbert
Preceded by Sir Ian Campbell	Commander-in-Chief, South Atlantic Station; 1956–1958	Succeeded by Sir Dymock Watson
Government offices
Preceded by Sir Thomas Elmhirst	Lieutenant Governor of Guernsey; 1958–1964	Succeeded by Sir Charles Coleman
