= Admiral Purvis =

Admiral Purvis may refer to:

- John Purvis (Royal Navy officer) (1787–1857), British Royal Navy vice admiral
- John Child Purvis (died 1825), British Royal Navy admiral
- Neville Purvis (born 1936), British Royal Navy vice admiral
