= Commander-in-Chief, South Atlantic =

Former British Royal Navy Station

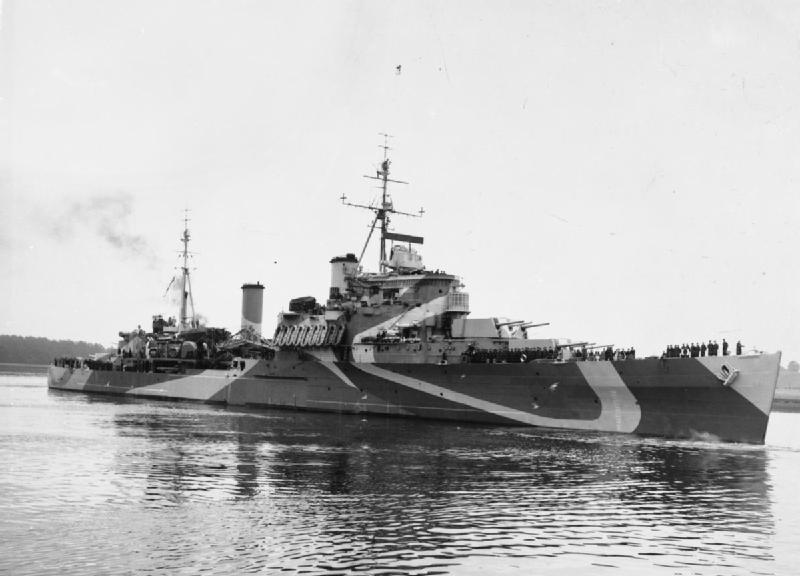
- HMS Bermuda, flagship of the Commander-in-Chief, South Atlantic in the early 1950s
- Active: 1914, 1939–1967
- Country: United Kingdom
- Branch: Royal Navy
- Type: military formation
- Garrison/HQ: Freetown, Simonstown, and Port Stanley

The Commander-in-Chief South Atlantic was an operational commander of the Royal Navy from 1939. The South American area was added to his responsibilities in 1960, and the post disestablished in 1967.

Immediately before the outbreak of the Second World War, the designation of Commander-in-Chief, Africa was changed to Commander-in-Chief South Atlantic, '..and the Admiral transferred his flag from Simonstown to Freetown, Sierra Leone, and assumed general naval control over British movements in the whole of the South Atlantic Ocean. At the same time, the South American Division of the America and West Indies Station, comprising the cruisers Exeter and Ajax, was transferred to the new South Atlantic Station.' It was sometimes referred to as the South Atlantic Station.

== History ==
The South Atlantic Station existed during and after the Second World War having been changed from the Commander-in-Chief, Africa. Its area of responsibility covered the Atlantic Ocean south of a line drawn between the northern French West African (now Mauritanian) border and French Guiana and the Southern Ocean and Indian Ocean east of a line drawn south from the western entrance to the Magellan Strait and west of a line drawn south from the South African–Mozambican border. The South Atlantic Station had bases at Freetown and Simonstown.

On 3 September 1939, Leo Niehorster's site lists the force as comprising the South American Division under Commodore Henry Harwood comprising HMS Exeter, HMS Ajax, and HMS Cumberland; the 6th Cruiser Squadron, comprising only HMS Neptune, Vice Admiral George Lyon's flagship; the 9th Cruiser Squadron, with HMS Despatch, HMS Danae, HMS Dauntless, and HMS Durban; the seaplane carrier HMS Albatross, en route to Freetown from Lee-on-Solent; the 7th Submarine Flotilla, of two boats on their way from Gibraltar to Freetown; four destroyers, all at Freetown; six miscellaneous craft and two harbour vessels, all at Freetown; and the Gambia and Gold Coast Naval Volunteer Forces.

On 2 October 1939, HMS Achilles, then operating with the liner Orduna north of Callao off the west coast of South America, was instructed that after fuelling from the fleet tanker RFA Orangeleaf, she was to proceed south about to the South Atlantic. "The Achilles was to show herself at Chilean ports as considered desirable and refuel at the Falkland Islands. The passage was to be made with moderate despatch and on arrival the cruiser was to come under the orders of the Commander-in-Chief, Africa." Thus Achilles arrived in the South Atlantic and joined Commodore Harwood's force, later to take part in the Battle of the River Plate against the Graf Spee.

In 1955, the new Simonstown Agreement on naval cooperation between the UK and the Union of South Africa was agreed after much discussion. It was planned to include:

- the combined use of Simonstown by the Royal Navy and South African Navy in peace and in war (even if South Africa were neutral in some non-Communist war, a most remote contingency), on the understanding that the base would also be available in war to the allies of the United Kingdom;
- the gradual assumption of responsibility by the South African Navy for the operation and administration of the base for combined use;
- the assumption by South Africa of responsibility in war for the operational and administrative control of a local sub-area of a South Atlantic Strategic Zone; and
- that a Royal Navy officer would continue as Commander-in-Chief South Atlantic in peace, with headquarters and communications at the Cape, and that his designation in war would be Commander of the South Atlantic Strategic Zone.

HMS Veryan Bay arrived at Simon's Town on 19 November 1956. After a series of visits to East African ports, the ship was nominated for transfer to the Reserve. On 19 January 1957, she sailed for the UK, calling at Lobito in Portuguese West Africa, Boma in the Belgian Congo, and sailed up the Congo River to Matadi. She then called at Libreville in French Equatorial Africa, São Tomé Island in the Gulf of Guinea, Lagos, Nigeria, Monrovia, Liberia, and Freetown, Sierra Leone. At Freetown she wore the flag of the Commander-in-Chief, South Atlantic, Vice Admiral Sir Geoffrey Robson. Veryan Bay arrived at Plymouth on 11 March and was then paid-off.

In April 1957, the Simonstown base was handed over to the Union of South Africa in accordance with the 1955 agreement. On 24 May 1957, HMS Burghead Bay was recommissioned for service in the 7th Frigate Squadron in the South Atlantic, sailing for Simon's Town in August. She made calls in Brazil and Argentina, took part in squadron exercises in South Atlantic, and was also deployed in South African waters for joint exercises with the South African Navy. In early 1958, she visited ports in East Africa. In May she sailed for the Falklands for her third and final tour of duty as guard ship, departing in June and sailing to the UK via ports on west coast of South America, making calls in Chile and Peru before transiting the Panama Canal, and finally arriving at Devonport in August where she was decommissioned, put into Reserve, and on the Disposal List. During this commission, she was commanded by Commander Stanley McArdle.

In 1960, the post of Commander-in-Chief, America and West Indies, was abolished, with the incumbent, Vice-Admiral Sir John Eaton, becoming the NATO Deputy Supreme Allied Commander Atlantic (SACLANT). The southern part of the former America & West Indies area was transferred to the South Atlantic, and that flag officer becoming Commander-in-Chief, South Atlantic and South America (CINCSASA). At about that time, CINCSASA, "flying his flag ashore at Wynberg in Cape Province, had only two frigates and .. HMS Protector under his command, one of the frigates being permanently stationed in the West Indies."

The Leopard-class frigate Lynx served as Vice Admiral Talbot's flagship in the 1960s. She was the last ship remaining on the station and returned home after April 1967 and the abolishing of the CINCSASA post. It was planned that the Commander-in-Chief was to haul down his flag on 11 April 1967 and to leave Cape Town the following day. The station was abolished/absorbed into the Western Fleet that year, when Western Fleet assumed responsibility for all ships "West of Suez".

After 11 April 1967, a Senior British Naval Officer South Africa with the rank of Commodore remained at Afrikander (at Youngsfield, a suburb just south of Cape Town), who quickly became responsible to Commander-in-Chief Western Fleet. (Home Fleet was succeeded by Western Fleet on 5 June 1967.) Captain James William Cook was the first Commanding Officer, HMS Afrikander & Senior British Naval Officer, South Africa (as Commodore), from April 1967 to February 1969. Acting Commodore Nigel Cecil filled the post from 1971 to 1973. Officers continued to be posted there until February 1976 when the post was disestablished and HMS Afrikander closed. Commodore A F C Wemyss OBE was the last incumbent.

== Commanders-in-Chief ==
Commanders-in-Chief have included:

=== Commander-in-Chief, South Atlantic ===
- Vice Admiral Sir George Lyon (1939–1940)
- Vice Admiral Sir Robert Raikes (1940–1941)
- Vice Admiral Sir Algernon Willis (1941–1942)
- Vice Admiral Sir Campbell Tait (1942–1944)
- Vice Admiral Sir Robert Burnett (1944–1946)
- Vice Admiral Sir Clement Moody (1946–1948)
- Vice Admiral Sir Desmond McCarthy (1948–1950)
- Vice Admiral Sir Herbert Packer (1950–1952)
- Vice Admiral Sir Peveril William-Powlett (1952–1954)
- Vice Admiral Sir Ian Campbell (1954–1956)
- Vice Admiral Sir Geoffrey Robson (1956–1958)

=== Commander-in-Chief, South Atlantic and South America ===
- Vice Admiral Sir Dymock Watson (1958–1960)
- Vice Admiral Sir Nicholas Copeman (1960–1963)
- Vice Admiral Sir Fitzroy Talbot (1963–1965)
- Vice Admiral Sir John Gray (1965–1967)

== See also ==
- List of fleets and major commands of the Royal Navy
