= Peter Cazalet =

Peter Cazalet may refer to:

- Peter Cazalet (Royal Navy officer) (1899 – 1982)
- Peter Cazalet (racehorse trainer) (1907 – 1973)
