= Geoffrey Dalton =

Royal Navy admiral (1931–2020)

Vice-Admiral Sir Geoffrey Dalton KCB
- Born: 14 April 1931
- Died: 26 September 2020 (aged 89)
- Military career
- Allegiance: United Kingdom
- Branch: Royal Navy
- Service years: 1949–1987
- Rank: Vice-Admiral
- Commands: HMS Nubian; 7th Frigate Squadron; School of Maritime Operations
- Awards: Knight Commander of the Order of the Bath

Vice-Admiral Sir Geoffrey Thomas James Oliver Dalton KCB (14 April 1931 – 26 September 2020) was a Royal Navy officer who became Deputy Supreme Allied Commander Atlantic.

== Naval career ==
Educated at Reigate Grammar School and the Royal Naval College, Dartmouth, Dalton joined the Royal Navy in 1949. He was given command of the frigate HMS Nubian in 1969. He was appointed Commanding Officer of the frigate HMS Jupiter as well as Captain of the 7th Frigate Squadron in 1977, Commander of the School of Maritime Operations in 1979 and Assistant Chief of the Naval Staff (Policy) in 1981. He went on to be Deputy Supreme Allied Commander Atlantic in 1984 and retired in 1987.

In retirement he became Secretary General of MENCAP and, more recently, President of the D-Day and Normandy Fellowship.

He died on 26 September 2020 at the age of 89.

== Family ==
In 1957 he married Jane Hamilton Baynes; they have four sons.

Military offices
Preceded by Sir David Hallifax	Deputy Supreme Allied Commander Atlantic; 1984–1987	Succeeded by Sir Richard Thomas
