= Robert Stevens (Royal Navy officer) =

Rear Admiral Robert Stevens CB
- Born: 14 March 1948 (age 78)
- Military career
- Allegiance: United Kingdom
- Branch: Royal Navy
- Service years: 1966–2005
- Rank: Rear Admiral
- Commands: Commander Operations; 7th Frigate Squadron; HMS Argonaut; HMS Torbay; HMS Odin
- Awards: Companion of the Order of the Bath

Rear Admiral Robert P. Stevens, CB (born 14 March 1948) is a former Royal Navy officer who served as Commander Operations and Rear Admiral, Submarines.

== Naval career ==
Educated at Britannia Royal Naval College and Manchester Business School, Stevens joined the Royal Navy in September 1966 and was appointed Commanding Officer of the submarine HMS Odin in 1979 and of the submarine HMS Torbay in 1985. He went on to be assistant director of Strategic Systems at the Ministry of Defence in 1989 and Commanding Officer of the frigate HMS Argonaut as well as Captain of the 7th Frigate Squadron in 1992. After that he became Director Joint Warfare at the Ministry of Defence in 1994, Commander Operations and Rear Admiral, Submarines in 1998 and Chief of Staff to the Commander of Naval Forces South in 2002 before retiring in 2005.

== Retirement ==
In retirement Stevens became Chief Executive of the British Marine Federation.

Military offices
Preceded by James Perowne	Commander Operations; 1998–2002	Succeeded by Niall Kilgour
