= John Gray (Royal Navy officer) =

Vice-Admiral Sir John Gray KBE CB
- Born: 13 June 1913
- Died: February 1998 (aged 84)
- Military career
- Allegiance: United Kingdom
- Branch: Royal Navy
- Service years: 1926–1967
- Rank: Vice-Admiral
- Commands: HMS Lynx; HMS Victorious; Director General of Training; South Atlantic and South America Station
- Conflicts: World War II; Korean War
- Awards: Knight Commander of the Order of the British Empire; Companion of the Order of the Bath

Vice-Admiral Sir John Michael Dudgeon Gray KBE CB (13 June 1913 – February 1998) was a Royal Navy officer who went on to be Commander-in-Chief, South Atlantic and South America Station.

== Naval career ==
Educated at the Royal Naval College, Dartmouth, Gray joined the Royal Navy in 1926. He was promoted to lieutenant on 9 December 1935, with seniority from 1 December 1935. He was promoted to lieutenant commander on 24 December 1943, with seniority from 1 December 1943. He served with US forces at Anzio in Italy in 1944. After the War, he became Naval Adviser to the UK Mission to Japan where he was present at the war crimes trials of senior Japanese military and political leaders.

He then served in Korea in 1950. Promoted to captain on 31 December 1952, he commanded HMS Lynx and then HMS Victorious. On 7 January 1962, he was appointed a Naval Aide de Camp to The Queen. He was appointed Director General of Training at the Ministry of Defence in 1964. On 19 November 1965, he was promoted to vice admiral. He was appointed Commander-in-Chief, South Atlantic and South America Station, in 1965 before retiring in 1967.

== Awards and decorations ==
On 7 June 1951, the then Commander Gray was appointed an Officer of the Order of the British Empire (OBE) "in recognition of non-operational services in Japan in connection with operations in Korea".

As part of the 1964 New Year Honours, the then Rear-Admiral Gray was appointed a Companion of the Order of the Bath (CB).

As part of the 1967 Queen's Birthday Honours, Vice Admiral Gray was promoted to Knight Commander of the Order of the British Empire (KBE).

== Personal life ==
In 1939 he married Margaret Helen Purvis; they had one son and one daughter.

Military offices
Preceded by Sir Fitzroy Talbot	Commander-in-Chief, South Atlantic Station; 1965–1967	Succeeded by Post Disbanded
