= Gordon Hubback =

Royal Navy Vice Admiral (1902–1970)

Vice-Admiral Sir Gordon Hubback KBE CB
- Born: 11 September 1902
- Died: 25 August 1970 (aged 67)
- Military career
- Allegiance: United Kingdom
- Branch: Royal Navy
- Rank: Vice-Admiral
- Commands: HMS Gregale; HMS Glasgow
- Conflicts: World War II
- Awards: Knight Commander of the Order of the British Empire; Companion of the Order of the Bath

Vice-Admiral Sir Arthur Gordon Voules Hubback KBE CB (11 September 1902 – 25 August 1970) was a Royal Navy officer who went on to be Fourth Sea Lord.

== Early life ==
Gordon Hubback was born on 11 September 1902 to Margaret Rose Frances (Daisy) Voules and Arthur Benison Hubback who was working as an architect in Malaya. He was educated at the Royal Naval College, Osborne, and then at the Royal Naval College, Dartmouth. He was appointed captain on 15 May 1916.

== Naval career ==
Hubback served in World War II at the Plans Division at the Admiralty, where he helped plan the Norwegian campaign. After serving in various ships from 1940, he was appointed commanding officer of HMS Gregale in March 1943. In July of that year he joined the staff of the Commander-in-Chief, Eastern Fleet and in July 1944 he became assistant director of plans at the Admiralty.

After the war he was given command of the cruiser HMS Glasgow before being appointed commodore superintendent at Malta in 1947 and then commodore at the Royal Naval Barracks at Lee-on-the-Solent in 1950. He went on to be admiral superintendent at HM Naval Base Portsmouth in 1951. He was promoted to vice-admiral on 16 December 1954, and served as director of dockyards at the Admiralty from 1954 to 1957. He was then appointed Fourth Sea Lord in 1958, and retired from the navy in November 1958.

Hubback was appointed a Companion of the Order of the Bath in 1953, and made a Knight Commander of the Order of the British Empire in 1957.

In retirement he became Managing Director of the newly privatised Bailey's Dockyard in Malta.

== Personal life ==
Hubback married Elizabeth Pearson Rogers in 1930, with whom he had one son. His first wife died in 1949, and he married Sheila Mary Roberton the same year.

Military offices
Preceded by Sir Dymock Watson	Fourth Sea Lord; 1958–1959	Succeeded by Sir Nicholas Copeman
