= Peveril William-Powlett =

Royal Navy Vice-Admiral and England international rugby union player (1898–1985)

Vice-Admrial Sir Peveril William-Powlett KCB KCMG CBE DSO
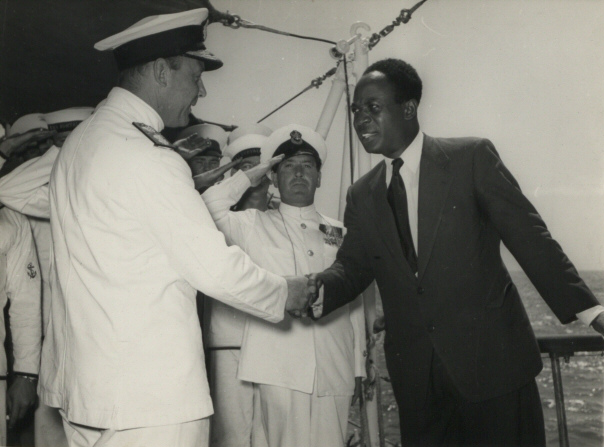
- William-Powlett (left) receiving the Prime Minister of the Gold Coast, Kwame Nkrumah aboard HMS Euryalus in 1953
- Born: 5 March 1898; Abergavenny, Monmouthshire, Wales
- Died: 10 November 1985 (aged 87); Honiton, Devon, England
- Military career
- Allegiance: United Kingdom
- Branch: Royal Navy
- Service years: 1914–1954
- Rank: Vice-Admiral
- Commands: South Atlantic Station (1952–54); Royal Naval College, Dartmouth (1946–48); HMS Newcastle (1942–44); HMS Fiji (1940–41); HMS Frobisher (1939)
- Conflicts: First World War: Gallipoli campaign; Battle of Jutland; Second World War: Battle of Crete
- Awards: Knight Commander of the Order of the Bath; Knight Commander of the Order of St Michael and St George; Commander of the Order of the British Empire; Distinguished Service Order
- Other work: Governor of Southern Rhodesia (1954–59)

Peveril William-Powlett
Rugby union career
- Position: Prop
Senior career
| Years | Team | Apps | (Points) |
| – | United Services Portsmouth | | |
International career
| Years | Team | Apps | (Points) |
| 1922 | England | 1 | (0) |

Vice-Admiral Sir Peveril Barton Reiby Wallop William-Powlett, KCB, KCMG, CBE, DSO (5 March 1898 – 10 November 1985) was a Royal Navy officer who served as Commander-in-Chief, South Atlantic Station from 1952 to 1954.

== Naval career ==
William-Powlett attended Cordwalles School. He joined the Royal Navy as a midshipman in 1914 and served in the First World War, specialising in signals. A keen sportsman, he played rugby for England in 1922. He saw service with the New Zealand Division from 1931 to 1936 and then commanded the cadet training ship HMS Frobisher in 1939.

In 1935, William-Powlett was awarded the King George V Silver Jubilee Medal.

William-Powlett served in the Second World War as Director of Manning at the Admiralty and then commanded the cruiser HMS Fiji, which was sunk during the Battle of Crete in 1941. He was appointed Chief of Staff of Force H at Gibraltar in 1941 and then commanded HMS Newcastle from 1942. He became Captain of the Fleet in the Home Fleet in 1944.

After the war, William-Powlett commanded the Royal Naval College, Dartmouth and then became Naval Secretary in 1948. He went on to be Flag Officer (Destroyers) in the Mediterranean Fleet in 1950 and Commander-in-Chief, South Atlantic in 1952. He retired in 1954.

In retirement William-Powlett served as Governor of Southern Rhodesia from 1954 until 1959. He was High Sheriff of Devon in 1972.

== Family ==
In 1923, William-Powlett married Helen Constance Crombie; they had three daughters. Following the death of his first wife he married Barbara Patience William-Powlett, widow of his brother, in 1966.

William-Powlett's second daughter, Vernon, married Henry Bruce of Salloch, and was the mother of the royal commentator Alastair Bruce of Crionaich. His third daughter, Judith, married Sir Michael Colman, 3rd Baronet.

Military offices
| Preceded by Maurice Mansergh | Naval Secretary; 1948–1950 | Succeeded by William Davis |
| Preceded by Sir Herbert Packer | Commander-in-Chief, South Atlantic Station; 1952–1954 | Succeeded by Sir Ian Campbell |
Government offices
| Preceded by Sir Robert Tredgold | Governor of Southern Rhodesia; 1954–1959 | Succeeded by Sir Humphrey Gibbs |
