= Fitzroy Talbot =

Royal Navy Vice Admiral (1909–1998)

Vice-Admiral Sir Fitzroy Talbot KBE CB DSO* DL
- Portrait by Walter Bird, 1960
- Born: 22 October 1909
- Died: 16 June 1998 (aged 88)
- Military career
- Allegiance: United Kingdom
- Branch: Royal Navy
- Service years: 1926–1967
- Rank: Vice-Admiral
- Commands: HMS Whitshed; HMS Teazer; HMS Alert; 3rd Destroyer Squadron; Flag Officer, Arabian Seas and Persian Gulf; South Atlantic and South America; Commander-in-Chief, Plymouth
- Conflicts: World War II; Suez Crisis
- Awards: Knight Commander of the Order of the British Empire; Companion of the Order of the Bath; Distinguished Service Order & Bar

Vice-Admiral Sir Arthur Allison Fitzroy Talbot KBE CB DSO & Bar DL (22 October 1909 – 16 June 1998) was a Royal Navy officer who went on to be Commander-in-Chief, Plymouth.

== Early life ==
Son of Royal Navy Captain Henry Fitzroy George Talbot (1874-1920), DSO (a third great-grandson of Charles Talbot, 1st Baron Talbot, Lord Chancellor of Great Britain from 1733 to 1737) and Susan Blair Athol (died 1951), daughter of William Allison, of South Kilvington, Thirsk, Yorkshire, Talbot had an elder sister, Nesta (1905-1994). His paternal ancestors included the politicians Jacob Bouverie, 1st Viscount Folkestone, Henry Somerset, 5th Duke of Beaufort, William Ponsonby, 1st Baron Ponsonby, and Richard Molesworth, 3rd Viscount Molesworth.

== Naval career ==
Educated at the Royal Naval College, Dartmouth, Fitzroy Talbot joined the Royal Navy in 1926. He went to sea as a midshipman in the battleship HMS Royal Oak.

He served in World War II initially as commander of the 10th Anti-Submarine Striking Force in the North Sea and then as commander of the 3rd Motor Gun Boat Flotilla in the Channel. He commanded the destroyers HMS Whitshed and HMS Teazer, in the latter capacity supporting the advance through Italy. Finally he was chief of staff to the Commodore, Western Isles.

After the War he became chief staff officer (operations) for the Far East Station before taking command of the frigate HMS Alert in 1949. In 1950 he was appointed naval attaché in Moscow and then, as commander of 3rd Destroyer Squadron, he took part in the Suez Crisis in 1956 after which he became commodore, Royal Navy Barracks, Portsmouth, in 1957. His next appointment was as Flag Officer, Arabian Seas and Persian Gulf, in 1960 before being made Commander-in-Chief, South Atlantic and South America, in 1963. He was made Commander-in-Chief, Plymouth, in 1965 and retired in 1967.

In retirement he became Deputy Lieutenant of Somerset in 1973.

== Family ==
In 1940 he married Joyce Gertrude, daughter of Frank Edwin Linley, of Lower Sloane Street, London SW1, and of Tower Park, Fowey, Cornwall; they went on to have two daughters. Following the death of his first wife, in 1983 he married Elizabeth, daughter of Rupert Handley Ensor and former wife of Royal Navy Captain Richard Steel and of stockjobber Sir Esmond Otho Durlacher (1901-1982).

== Honours and awards ==
- 25 June 1940 – Lieutenant Arthur Allison FitzRoy Talbot, Royal Navy, is appointed to be a Companion of the Distinguished Service Order for courage and resource in operations on the Norwegian Coast.
- 10 June 1961 – Rear-Admiral Arthur Allison FitzRoy Talbot, DSO, is appointed to be a Companion of the Order of the Bath.
- 1 January 1964 – Vice-Admiral Arthur Allison Fitzroy Talbot, CB, DSO, is appointed a Knight Commander of the Order of the British Empire.

Military offices
Preceded by Sir Nicholas Copeman	Commander-in-Chief, South Atlantic Station; 1963–1965	Succeeded by Sir John Gray
Preceded by Sir Nigel Henderson	Commander-in-Chief, Plymouth; 1965–1967	Succeeded by Sir Charles Mills
