= 7th Frigate Squadron =

- Active: April 1951 – March 1993
- Country: United Kingdom
- Branch: Royal Navy
- Size: Squadron

Commanders
- First: Captain David C. Ingram
- Last: Captain Robert P. Stevens

The 7th Frigate Squadron was an administrative unit of the Royal Navy from 1951 to 1993.

== Operational history ==
During its existence, the squadron included Bay-class, Type 41 and Leander-class frigates.

Ships from the squadron served with the Home Fleet, with the West Indies Squadron, participated in the Cod Wars, the Silver Jubilee Fleet Review, the Falklands War and as part of STANAVFORLANT.

== Squadron commander ==
Commander	Ship	Dates
Captain David C. Ingram	HMS St Austell Bay	April 1951 – May 1952
Captain Earl Cairns	HMS St Austell Bay	May 1952 – March 1953
Captain Richard G.W. Hare	HMS Veryan Bay	March 1953 – February 1954
Captain Hugh C. Martell	HMS Bigbury Bay	February 1954 – February 1955
Captain C. Patrick Norman	HMS Mounts Bay	February 1955 – April 1956
Captain George E. Hunt	HMS Bigbury Bay	April 1956 – June 1958
Captain William G. Meeke	HMS Lynx	August 1958 – February 1960
Captain Robin A. Begg	HMS Lynx	February 1960 – August 1961
Captain David B.N. Mellis	HMS Puma	August 1961 – May 1963
Captain Peter M. Austin	HMS Lynx	May 1963 – January 1965
Captain Peter G.R. Mitchell	HMS Lynx/HMS Puma	January 1965–1966
Captain Martin N.Lucey	HMS Puma	1966–
Captain Cyril J. Cunningham	HMS Puma	
Captain Oliver P. Sutton	HMS Scylla	July 1972 – October 1974
Captain David G. Armytage	HMS Jupiter	June 1976 – September 1977
Captain Geoffrey T.J.O. Dalton	HMS Jupiter	September 1977 – June 1979
Captain Charles E.T. Baker	HMS Argonaut	June 1979 – May 1981
Captain Christopher H. Layman	HMS Argonaut/HMS Cleopatra	May 1981 – January 1983
Captain Guy F. Liardet	HMS Cleopatra	January 1983–1984
Captain Roy T. Newman	HMS Cleopatra	1984 – December 1985
Captain Peter Dalrymple-Smith	HMS Cleopatra	December 1985–1987
Captain Thomas M. Le Marchand	HMS Cleopatra	1987 – January 1989
Captain John P. Clarke	HMS Argonaut	January 1989 – June 1990
Captain William K. Hutchison	HMS Argonaut	June 1990–1992
Captain Robert P. Stevens	HMS Argonaut	1992 – March 1993

== See also ==
- List of squadrons and flotillas of the Royal Navy
