= Ian Campbell (Royal Navy officer) =

Royal Navy Vice Admiral (1898-1980)

Vice-Admiral Sir Ian Campbell KBE CB DSO*
- Campbell in 1950
- Born: 8 August 1898
- Died: 15 April 1980 (aged 81)
- Military career
- Allegiance: United Kingdom
- Branch: Royal Navy
- Service years: 1911–1956
- Rank: Vice-Admiral
- Commands: South Atlantic Station (1954–56); Reserve Fleet (1953–54); HMS Jamaica (1946–47); HMS Milne (1942–44); HMS Hyperion (1936–38)
- Conflicts: Second World War
- Awards: Knight Commander of the Order of the British Empire; Companion of the Order of the Bath; Distinguished Service Order & Bar

Vice-Admiral Sir Ian Murray Robertson Campbell, KBE, CB, DSO & Bar (8 August 1898 – 15 April 1980) was a Royal Navy officer who served as Commander-in-Chief, South Atlantic Station from 1954 to 1956.

== Naval career ==
Promoted to captain in 1940, Campbell served in the Second World War in the Arctic Convoys commanding the destroyer HMS Milne from 1942 to 1944 and then becoming deputy director of naval intelligence. He was appointed Flag Officer Liaison for the Middle East in 1950, and Flag Officer Flotillas in the Mediterranean Fleet in 1952. He was promoted to vice admiral on 18 March 1953, then became Flag Officer Commanding the Reserve Fleet in 1953, and Commander-in-Chief, South Atlantic Station in 1954, before retiring in 1956.

Military offices
Preceded by Sir Henry McCall	Commander-in-Chief, Reserve Fleet; 1953–1954	Succeeded by Sir John Eaton
Preceded by Sir Peveril William-Powlett	Commander-in-Chief, South Atlantic Station; 1954–1956	Succeeded by Sir Geoffrey Robson
