= John McAnally =

British Vice Admiral

Vice Admiral John McAnally CB LVO
- Born: 9 April 1945 (age 81); Epsom, Surrey
- Military career
- Allegiance: United Kingdom
- Branch: Royal Navy
- Service years: 1964–2001
- Rank: Vice Admiral
- Commands: Commandant of the Royal College of Defence Studies; Flag Officer, Training and Recruitment; 6th Frigate Squadron; HMS Hermione; HMS Ariadne; HMS Alacrity; HMS Torquay
- Awards: Companion of the Order of the Bath; Lieutenant of the Royal Victorian Order

Vice Admiral John Henry Stuart McAnally, CB, LVO (born 9 April 1945) is a former Royal Navy officer who served as Commandant of the Royal College of Defence Studies from 1998 to 2001.

He was educated at Willington School in Putney and then Westminster School.

== Naval career ==
McAnally was commissioned as a sub-lieutenant in the Royal Navy on 1 September 1964. After a number of postings, he served on HMY Britannia from 1980 and was made a Member (later Lieutenant) of the Royal Victorian Order in 1982. He commanded successively the frigates HMS Torquay and HMS Alacrity from 1984. He then became Commanding Officer successively of the frigates HMS Ariadne and HMS Hermione as well as captain of the 6th Frigate Squadron from 1987. He went on to be Assistant Director of Naval Plans in 1989, Director of Naval Logistics Policy in 1993 and Director of Naval Staff Duties in 1994. After that he became Flag Officer, Training and Recruitment in 1996 and Commandant of the Royal College of Defence Studies in 1998. He was appointed Companion of the Order of the Bath in 2000 and retired in 2001.

== Retirement ==
In retirement McAnally became an advisor to Flagship Training and chairman of the Naval and Military Club in London.

He has been National President of the Royal Naval Association since 2001.

Military offices
Preceded by Sir Scott Grant	Commandant of the Royal College of Defence Studies; 1998–2001	Succeeded by Sir Christopher Wallace
