= HMS Torquay =

1956 Type 12 or Whitby-class frigate of the Royal Navy

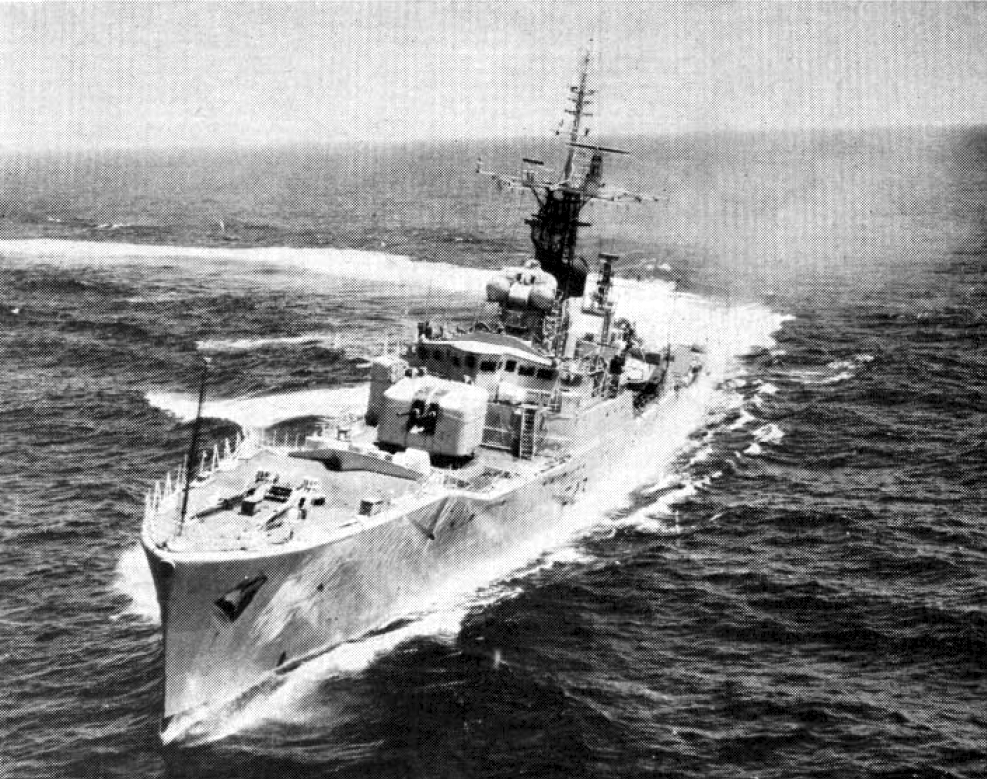

History

United Kingdom
- Name: HMS Torquay
- Ordered: 6 March 1951
- Builder: Harland and Wolff
- Laid down: 11 March 1953
- Launched: 1 July 1954
- Commissioned: 10 May 1956
- Decommissioned: 23 March 1985
- Identification: Pennant number: F43
- Fate: Scrapped 1987

General characteristics
- Class & type: Whitby-class frigate
- Displacement: 2,150 tons (2,185 tonnes); 2,560 tons full load (2,600 tonnes)
- Length: 360 ft (109.7 m) w/l; 370 ft (112.8 m) o/a
- Beam: 41 ft (12.5 m)
- Draught: 17 ft (5.18 m)
- Propulsion: Y-100 plant; 2 Babcock & Wilcox boilers, 2 English Electric steam turbines, 2 shafts, 30,000 shp (22 MW)
- Speed: 30 kn (56 km/h)
- Range: 370 tons oil fuel, 4,200 nmi (7,780 km) at 12 knots (22 km/h)
- Complement: 152, later 225
- Sensors & processing systems: Radar Type 293Q target indication, later; Radar Type 993; Radar Type 277Q height finding (later removed); Radar Type 275 fire control on director Mark 6M; Radar Type 262 fire control on STAAG; Radar Type 974 navigation later Type 978; Type 1010 Cossor Mark 10 IFF; Sonar Type 174 search; Sonar Type 162 target classification; Sonar Type 170 attack
- Armament: 1 × twin 4.5 in (114 mm) gun Mark 6; 1 × twin 40 mm Bofors gun Mark 2 STAAG, later; 1 × single 40 mm Bofors gun Mark 7; 2 × Limbo A/S mortar Mark 10; 12 × 21 in A/S torpedo tubes (removed or never shipped) no tubes were fitted in 1963 -1964.

HMS Torquay was a Type 12 Whitby-class frigate of the British Royal Navy. They were the first frigates to have the "V" form hull. This evolutionary design made it possible to be driven in head sea without the usual slamming which occurs with conventional destroyers of the time. Each frigate cost 3.5 million pounds and the first ship completed was Torquay in May 1956.

== Design ==
The Whitbys were designed as specialist anti-submarine warships, intended to counter fast modern diesel-electric submarines. As such, the design was required to reach a speed of at least 27 knots (31 mph; 50 km/h), maintaining high speed in rough weather conditions and have a range of 4,500 nautical miles (5,200 mi; 8,300 km) at 12 knots (14 mph; 22 km/h). To meet these requirements, the Type 12s had a new hull form and, unlike the contemporary Type 41 anti-aircraft and Type 61 air direction frigates, were powered by steam turbines.

Torquay was 370 feet 0 inches (112.78 m) long overall and 360 feet 0 inches (109.73 m) at the waterline, with a beam of 41 feet 0 inches (12.50 m) and a draught of 11 feet 0 inches (3.35 m) forward and 13 feet 0 inches (3.96 m) at the propellers. The ships were powered by the new Y-100 machinery in which the ship's boilers and steam turbines were designed as a closely integrated set of machinery to increase efficiency. Two Babcock & Wilcox water-tube boilers fed steam at 550 pounds per square inch (3,800 kPa) and 850 °F (454 °C) to two sets of geared steam turbines which drove two propeller shafts, fitted with large (2 feet (0.61 m) diameter) slow-turning propellers. The machinery was rated at 30,000 shaft horsepower (22,000 kW), giving a speed of 29 knots (33 mph; 54 km/h). Crew was about 189 when operated as a leader and 152 as an ordinary ship.

A twin 4.5-inch (113 mm) Mark 6 gun mount was fitted forward, with 350 rounds of ammunition carried, with close-in armament of a stabilised STAAG (Stabilised Tachymetric Anti-Aircraft Gun) twin Bofors 40 mm L/60 gun mount aft. The design anti-submarine armament consisted of twelve 21-inch torpedo-tubes (eight fixed and two twin rotating mounts) for Mark 20E Bidder homing anti-submarine torpedoes, backed up by two Limbo anti-submarine mortars fitted aft. The Bidder homing torpedoes proved unsuccessful however, being too slow to catch modern submarines, and the torpedo tubes were soon removed.

The ship was fitted with a Type 293Q surface/air search radar on the foremast, with a Type 277 height-finding radar on a short mast forward of the foremast. A Mark 6M fire control system (including a Type 275 radar) for the 4.5 inch guns was mounted above the ship's bridge, while a Type 974 navigation radar was also fitted. The ship's sonar fit consisted of Type 174 search, Type 170 fire control sonar for Limbo and a Type 162 sonar for classifying targets on the sea floor.

== Operational Service ==
Torquay was laid down at Harland & Wolff's Belfast shipyard on 11 March 1953. The ship was launched by Lady Monkton on 1 July 1954, and completed on 10 May 1956.

On commissioning Torquay joined the 5th Frigate Squadron based at Portsmouth, becoming leader of the squadron on 28 August that year. She left for the Mediterranean at the end of October and took part in the Suez operation in November 1956. In December Torquay carried out patrols off Cyprus, and remained in the Mediterranean in the early part of 1957, returning to Portsmouth on 16 May 1957. In July 1958, Torquay took part in Operation Fortitude, when the aircraft carrier Eagle supported an airlift of British troops to Jordan following a request by King Hussein of Jordan more military assistance in response to unrest following the formation of the United Arab Republic by Egypt and Syria and the 14 July Revolution in Iraq.

Between 1963 and 1971 Torquay was one of the frigates allocated to the Dartmouth Training Squadron and between 1972 and 1985 Torquay served as a navigation training ship based in Portsmouth. In 1971 the ship was refitted with a solid main mast (as opposed to a lattice mast) and a large training navigation room was built where the forward set of triple-barrelled mortars used to be located (leaving one set of mortars). She was also fitted to undertake trials of CAAIS (Computer Assisted Action Information System). Torquay attended the 1977 Silver Jubilee Fleet Review off Spithead when she was part of the 2nd Frigate Squadron.

Replaced by the Leander-class frigate Juno as the navigation training vessel for the Royal Navy, Torquay paid off on 23 March 1985. At the time she was the longest serving ship of her class and the oldest frigate in the fleet. She was sold for scrap in 1987 and left Portsmouth on 1 July 1987 to be broken up in Barcelona, Spain.

Notable individuals who commanded Torquay at some point in her history include Peter Berger, Ken Darby, Fabian Malbon and John McAnally.

== Sources ==
- Blackman, Raymond V. B. (1960). Jane's Fighting Ships 1960–61. London: Sampson Low, Marston & Co. Ltd.
- Colledge, J. J.; Warlow, Ben (2006) [1969]. Ships of the Royal Navy: The Complete Record of All Fighting Ships of the Royal Navy from the 15th Century to the Present (3rd Rev ed.). London: Chatham Publishing. ISBN 978-1-86176-281-8. OCLC 67375475.
- Critchley, Mike (1992). British Warships Since 1945: Part 5: Frigates. Liskeard, UK: Maritime Press. ISBN 0-907771-13-0.
- Friedman, Norman (2008). British Destroyers & Frigates: The Second World War and After. Barnsley, UK: Seaforth Publishing. ISBN 978-1-84832-015-4.
- Gardiner, Robert; Chumbley, Stephen, eds. (1995). Conway's All The World's Fighting Ships 1947–1995. Annapolis, Maryland, USA: Naval Institute Press. ISBN 1-55750-132-7.
- Marriott, Leo (1983). Royal Navy Frigates 1945–1983. Shepperton, Surrey, UK: Ian Allan Ltd. ISBN 0-7110-1322-5.
- Roberts, John (2009). Safeguarding the Nation: The Story of the Royal Navy. Barnsley, UK: Seaforth Publishing. ISBN 978-1-84832-043-7.
