= John Lea (Royal Navy officer) =

British Royal Navy officer

Vice-Admiral Sir John Lea KBE
- Born: 4 June 1923; Simla, India
- Died: 20 May 2015 (aged 91)
- Military career
- Allegiance: United Kingdom
- Branch: Royal Navy
- Service years: 1942–1980
- Rank: Vice-Admiral
- Conflicts: Second World War
- Awards: Knight Commander of the Order of the British Empire

Vice-Admiral Sir John Stuart Crosbie Lea, KBE (4 June 1923 – 20 May 2015) was a senior Royal Navy officer who served as Director-General, Naval Manpower and Training from 1977 to 1980.

== Early life ==
John Stuart Crosbie Lea was born on 4 June 1923 in Simla, India, where his father was serving with the British Indian Army. When he was sent back to the United Kingdom for school at Boxgrove Prep in Guildford and then Shrewsbury School he spoke better Hindustani than English.

Lea studied science, mathematics and mechanics at Sixth form and aimed to study at the Royal Naval Engineering College in 1942.

== Naval career ==
In 1943, during his fifth term at the naval engineering college, Lea joined HMS Sheffield as part of his sea training. While aboard he stood watch on the bridge and witnessed the bombardment of German positions on the Amalfi coast. He then joined HMS Glasgow and participated in Operation Stonewall. This operation lead to the Battle of the Bay of Biscay where on 28 December 1943, in rough seas, Glasgow along with HMS Enterprise engaged German shipping. Three destroyers were sunk and a further four damaged before Glasgow was forced to break off the engagement. On returning to the college he found that although he had participated in two naval engagements he was not entitled to a campaign medal.

Lea became a submarine engineer in 1946. Across the subsequent decade he served in HMS Talent, HMS Tireless, HMS Aurochs, HMS Explorer as well as the submarine depot ship HMS Forth at Malta. He graduated from the Naval Staff College in 1958 then served in HMS Daring between 1959 and 1961 as squadron engineer officer.

In the post of marine engineer, Lea joined the aircraft carrier HMS Centaur in 1966 before becoming deputy superintendent of the Clyde submarine base in 1967. The work entailed making the base ready for Polaris missile-firing submarines, this he did in budget and ahead of schedule.

In 1974, while commodore of the Portsmouth barracks, Lea was asked if it would be permissible to hold a Trafalgar Night dinner on 21 October. Concerned about the availability of after dinner speakers Lea suggested Pickle Night as an alternative. This was in honour of the return of HMS Pickle, a schooner carrying word of the Battle of Trafalgar. The tradition of Pickle Night dinners was born.

Lea was appointed Director-General, Naval Manpower and Training from December 1977 to January 1980.

== Retirement ==
On his retirement, Lea went with his wife to their home on Hayling Island. He and his wife Pat were keen gardeners and also travelled the world in support of the England cricket team.
