= Naval Recruitment Training Agency =

United Kingdom government agency

Naval Recruitment Training Agency (NRTA)

Agency overview
- Formed: 1944-2005
- Preceding agency: Directorate-General, (Naval Manpower and Training)
- Jurisdiction: United Kingdom
- Headquarters: HMNB Portsmouth, England
- Agency executive: Flag Officer, Training and Recruitment
- Parent agency: Office of the Second Sea Lord

The Naval Recruitment Training Agency (NRTA) originally called the Naval Training Department was first established in 1944 as a department within the Admiralty it underwent numerous name changes until 1 April 1995 as a new agency of the Navy Department of the British Ministry of Defence. Its role was to contribute to the operational capability of the United Kingdom Armed Forces by recruiting to the Naval Service, delivering training to the Defence community it was administered by the Chief Executive (NRTA)/Flag Officer, Training and Recruitment it was abolished in 2005.

== History ==
The Navy first established a naval training department in December 1944 under the command of Rear-Admiral John W. Durnford, until 1951 when it was renamed the Department of the Deputy Chief of Naval Personnel(Training) administered by Rear-Admiral Charles F.W. Norris. In 1960 the department was then renamed the Directorate-General, Training until 1969 when it was abolished. In 1972 a new training organization was re-established called the Directorate-General, Naval Manpower and Training placed initially under the command of Vice-Admiral David Williams the directorate lasted until 1994. A new Naval Recruiting and Training Agency (NRTA) was launched in April 1995. It was an agency of the Ministry of Defence (MoD). The chief executive of NRTA was the Flag Officer, Training and Recruitment he also held the joint post of Director-General Naval Training and Education. The agency was headquartered at the Victory Building, HM Naval Base Portsmouth. The agency was responsible for the recruitment and training of personnel for the Royal Navy, and additionally to recruit for the Royal Marines. In addition it managed the Royal Naval Reserve and the University Royal Naval Units. The NRTA provided support to maritime-related youth organisations such as combined cadet forces, recognised sea scout units and volunteer cadet. The Agency was a subsidiary department of the Office of the Second Sea Lord and consisted of 21 training schools.

== In command of training ==
=== Director of Naval Training ===
Post holders included:

- Rear-Admiral John W. Durnford: December 1944-August 1947
- Rear-Admiral Philip Ruck-Keene: August 1947-July 1949
- Rear-Admiral John F. Stevens: July 1949-August 1950
- Rear-Admiral Charles F.W. Norris: August 1950 – 1951

=== Deputy Chief of Naval Personnel, (Training) ===
Post holders included:

- Rear-Admiral Charles F.W. Norris: 1951-July 1952
- Rear-Admiral Maxwell Richmond: July 1952-July 1954
- Rear-Admiral Benjamin Bryant: July 1954-February 1957
- Rear-Admiral R. Thomas Sandars: February 1957-August 1958
- Rear-Admiral Norman E. Denning: August 1958-May 1959

=== Director-General of Training ===
Post holders included:

- Vice-Admiral Sir Norman E. Dalton: May 1959-April 1960
- Vice-Admiral Sir Nigel S. Henderson: April 1960-July 1962
- Rear-Admiral John M.D. Gray: July 1962-January 1965
- Rear-Admiral Thomas H. Maxwell: January 1965-January 1967
- Rear-Admiral George W. Gay: January 1967 – 1969

=== Director-General, Naval Manpower and Training ===
Post holders included:

- Vice-Admiral David Williams: April 1972-February 1974
- Rear-Admiral Raymond D. Lygo: February 1974-June 1975
- Vice-Admiral A. Desmond Cassidi: June 1975-December 1977
- Vice-Admiral Sir John S.C. Lea: December 1977-January 1980
- Rear-Admiral Peter G.M. Herbert: January 1980-November 1981
- Rear-Admiral Nicholas J.S. Hunt: November 1981-November 1983
- Rear-Admiral Robert W.K. Gerken: November 1983-May 1985
- Rear-Admiral D. Benjamin Bathurst: May 1985-November 1986
- Rear-Admiral Brian T. Brown: November 1986-July 1988
- Rear-Admiral Neville Purvis: July 1988-December 1990
- Rear-Admiral Michael H.G. Layard: December 1990-March 1992
- Rear-Admiral Nicholas J. Wilkinson: March 1992-April 1994
- Rear-Admiral John P. Clarke: April 1994-January 1996

=== Chief Executives (NRTA) and Flag Officer Training and Recruitment ===
Post holders included:

- Rear Admiral John McAnally CB MVO, 1996-1998
- Rear Admiral John Chadwick CB, 1998-2001
- Rear Admiral Peter R Davies CBE, 2001-2003
- Rear Admiral K J Borley, 2003-2005

== Sources ==
- (ed.), Elayne Coakes ... (2002). Knowledge management in the sociotechnical world : the graffiti continues. London; Berlin; Heidelberg; New York; Barcelona; Hong Kong; Milan; Paris; Singapore; Tokyo: Springer. ISBN 9781852334413.
- Heyman, Charles (2006). The Armed Forces of the United Kingdom 2007–2008. Oxford, England: Casemate Publishers. ISBN 9781844154890.
- Inspectorate, Adult Learning. "Inspection Report Naval Recruiting and Training Agency" (PDF). reports.ofsted.gov.uk. OFSTED, H.M. Government UK, 11 March 2005.
- Mackie, Gordon. "Royal Navy Senior Appointments from 1865" (PDF). gulabin.com. Gordon Mackie, p. 199. December 2017.
- "Ministry of Defence Agencies". (2008), The Army Quarterly and Defence Journal. Volume 125. West of England Press, Bristol England.
