= HMS Burghead Bay =

Bay-class anti-aircraft frigate of the Royal Navy and Portuguese Navy

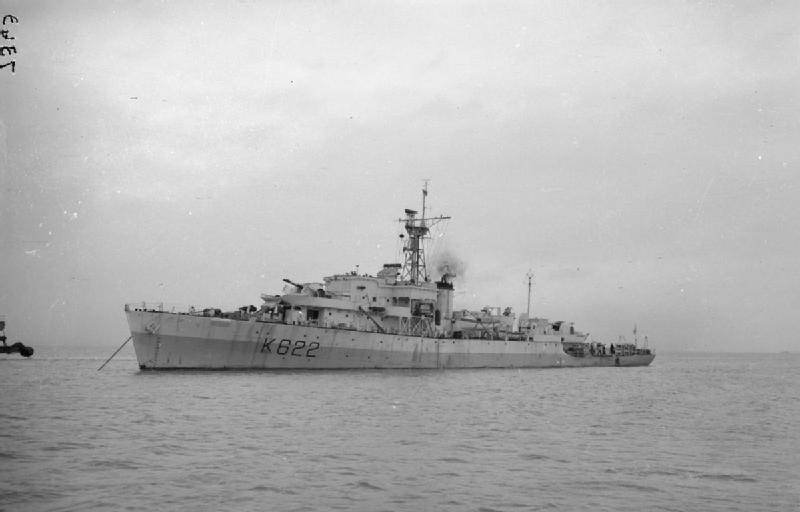
- Burghead Bay in September 1945

History

United Kingdom
- Name: HMS Burghead Bay
- Namesake: Burghead Bay
- Builder: Charles Hill & Sons, Bristol
- Yard number: 301
- Laid down: 21 September 1944
- Launched: 3 March 1945
- Commissioned: 20 September 1945
- Decommissioned: August 1958
- Identification: Pennant number K622/F622
- Fate: Sold to Portugal, May 1959
- Badge: On a Field per fess wavy Gold and barry wavy of four white and blue, issuant in fess four golden hills conjoined green.

Portugal
- Name: NRP Álvares Cabral
- Namesake: Pedro Álvares Cabral
- Acquired: May 1959
- Decommissioned: 23 June 1971
- Identification: F336
- Fate: Scrapped

General characteristics
- Class & type: Bay-class frigate
- Displacement: 1,600 long tons (1,626 t) standard; 2,530 long tons (2,571 t) full
- Length: 286 ft (87 m) p/p; 307 ft 3 in (93.65 m) o/a
- Beam: 38 ft 6 in (11.73 m)
- Draught: 12 ft 9 in (3.89 m)
- Propulsion: 2 × Admiralty 3-drum boilers, 2 shafts, 4-cylinder vertical triple expansion reciprocating engines, 5,500 ihp (4,100 kW)
- Speed: 19.5 knots (36.1 km/h; 22.4 mph)
- Range: 724 tons oil fuel, 9,500 nmi (17,600 km) at 12 knots (22 km/h)
- Complement: 157
- Sensors & processing systems: Type 285 fire control radar; Type 291 air warning radar; Type 276 target indication radar; High Frequency Direction Finder (HF/DF); IFF transponder
- Armament: 4 × QF 4 inch Mark XVI guns on 2 twin mounting HA/LA Mk.XIX; 4 × 40 mm Bofors A/A on 2 twin mounts Mk.V; 4 × 20 mm Oerlikon A/A on 2 twin mounts Mk.V; 1 × Hedgehog 24 barrel A/S projector; 2 rails and 4 throwers for 50 depth charges

HMS Burghead Bay was a Bay-class anti-aircraft frigate of the British Royal Navy, named for Burghead Bay in Morayshire.

The ship was originally ordered as a Loch-class frigate from Hall Russell of Aberdeen to be named Loch Harport. The order was cancelled in December 1943 and the ship was re-ordered as a Bay-class frigate from Charles Hill & Sons of Bristol in 1944. She was laid down on 21 September 1944 as Job No. J601 (Yard No. 301) and launched by Mrs A.V. Alexander, wife of the 1st Lord of the Admiralty on 3 March 1945.

== Royal Navy service ==
Commissioned for service on 20 September 1945, Burghead Bay carried out sea trials in October, and was deployed in November to the Plymouth Local Flotilla, where she stayed until the end of 1952, carrying out exercises, search and rescue in the Channel, and sea training. In 1948 her pennant number was changed to F622.

In January 1952 Burghead Bay sailed via La Plata and Montevideo to the Falkland Islands for guard ship duty, making calls to the South Orkney Islands, Graham Land, the South Shetland Islands and South Georgia carrying out survey work. In February, she was involved in the Hope Bay incident in Antarctica. In April she was relieved by sister ship Veryan Bay. She then sailed to Bermuda to join the West Indies Squadron, taking part in exercises and patrols, and making port visits around the Caribbean, before returning to the UK in October to refit.

Refitting was completed by April 1953, and she took part in the Coronation Naval Review at Spithead in June before returning to Bermuda for the usual programme of exercises and port visits, returning to the UK in June 1954. After another refit in which new radars and UHF radio equipment were fitted she departed for the West Indies in December. In February 1955 she sailed to the Falklands for guard ship duty, returning to Bermuda in June, and sailed back to the UK in November.

An extended refit at Devonport lasted from January 1956 until March 1957. On 24 May Burghead Bay was recommissioned for service in 7th Frigate Squadron on the South Atlantic Station, sailing for Simon's Town in August. She made calls in Brazil and Argentina, took part in squadron exercises in South Atlantic, and was also deployed in South African waters for joint exercises with the South African Navy. In early 1958 she visited ports in East Africa. In May she sailed for the Falklands for her third and final tour of duty as guard ship, departing in June and sailing to the UK via ports on west coast of South America, making calls in Chile and Peru before transiting the Panama Canal, and finally arriving at Devonport in August where she was decommissioned, put into Reserve, and on the Disposal List. During this commission she was commanded by Commander S L McArdle

== Portuguese naval service ==
Burghead Bay was bought by Portugal in May 1959 for service in the Portuguese Navy as NRP Álvares Cabral. She was deployed as an anti-aircraft frigate until 23 June 1971, and then scrapped.

== Publications ==
Colledge, J. J.; Warlow, Ben (2006) [1969]. Ships of the Royal Navy: The Complete Record of All Fighting Ships of the Royal Navy from the 15th Century to the Present (3rd Rev ed.). London: Chatham Publishing. ISBN 978-1-86176-281-8. OCLC 67375475.
