= Nicholas Copeman =

Royal Navy admiral (1906–1969)

Vice-Admiral Sir Nicholas Copeman KBE CB DSC
- Born: 28 February 1906; Brighton, Sussex, England
- Died: 21 November 1969 (aged 63); Gosport, Hampshire, England
- Military career
- Allegiance: United Kingdom
- Branch: Royal Navy
- Rank: Vice-Admiral
- Commands: South Atlantic and South America Station; 4th Destroyer Squadron; HMS Vernon
- Conflicts: Second World War
- Awards: Knight Commander of the Order of the British Empire; Companion of the Order of the Bath; Distinguished Service Cross

Vice-Admiral Sir Nicholas Alfred Copeman, KBE, CB, DSC (28 February 1906 – 21 November 1969) was a Royal Navy officer who served as Commander-in-Chief, South Atlantic and South America Station from 1960 to 1963.

== Naval career ==
Copeman served in the Second World War and was deployed to Norway 1940. In 1948 he was appointed deputy director of Torpedo, Mining and Anti-Submarine Warfare at the Admiralty. He went on to be captain in charge of the 2nd Minesweeping Flotilla in 1950 and joined the Admiralty Interview Board in 1952. He was made Commanding Officer of the torpedo school HMS Vernon in 1953 and commander of the 4th Destroyer Squadron in 1955. He became Vice Controller of the Navy in 1956 and Fourth Sea Lord in 1958. He was made Commander-in-Chief, South Atlantic and South America Station in 1960 and was based in Freetown, before leaving his post and retiring in 1963.

In retirement Copeman served as Commandant of the Sunningdale Park (Civil Defence) Staff College from 1966 to 1969.

Military offices
Preceded by Sir Gordon Hubback	Fourth Sea Lord; 1959–1960	Succeeded by Sir Michael Villiers
Preceded by Sir Dymock Watson	Commander-in-Chief, South Atlantic Station; 1960–1963	Succeeded by Sir Fitzroy Talbot
