= Dymock Watson =

Royal Navy vice-admiral

Vice-Admiral Sir Dymock Watson KCB CBE DL
- Born: 5 April 1904; Farnham, Surrey
- Died: 3 February 1988 (aged 84); Brecknock, Powys, Wales
- Military career
- Allegiance: United Kingdom
- Branch: Royal Navy
- Service years: 1918–1961
- Rank: Vice-Admiral
- Commands: HMS Illustrious; South Atlantic and South America Station
- Conflicts: World War II
- Awards: Knight Commander of the Order of the Bath; Commander of the Order of the British Empire

Vice-Admiral Sir Robert Dymock Watson KCB CBE DL (5 April 1904 – 3 February 1988) was a Royal Navy officer who went on to be Commander-in-Chief, South Atlantic and South America Station.

== Naval career ==
Watson joined the Royal Navy in 1918. He served in World War II as assistant director of plans on the Joint Planning Staff from 1944. After the War, he was appointed to the 1st Destroyer Flotilla in the Mediterranean Fleet and then, in 1950, became director of plans at the Admiralty. He went on to be commanding officer of the aircraft carrier HMS Illustrious in 1953 and flag officer, flotillas, in the Mediterranean Fleet in 1954. He was made Fourth Sea Lord and chief of supplies and transport in 1955 and Commander-in-Chief, South Atlantic and South America Station in 1958. He made an official visit to Ladysmith before retiring in 1961.

He lived at Trebinshwyn in Brecon.

== Personal life ==
His grandson is the actor and comedian Humphrey Ker, who based his 2011 Edinburgh Fringe show Dymock Watson: Nazi Smasher! on Watson's exploits in the Second World War.

Military offices
| Preceded by Sir Frederick Parham | Fourth Sea Lord; 1955–1958 | Succeeded by Sir Gordon Hubback |
| Preceded by Sir Geoffrey Robson | Commander-in-Chief, South Atlantic Station; 1958–1960 | Succeeded by Sir Nicholas Copeman |
