= HMS Lynx (F27) =

Leopard-class Type 41 anti aircraft frigate

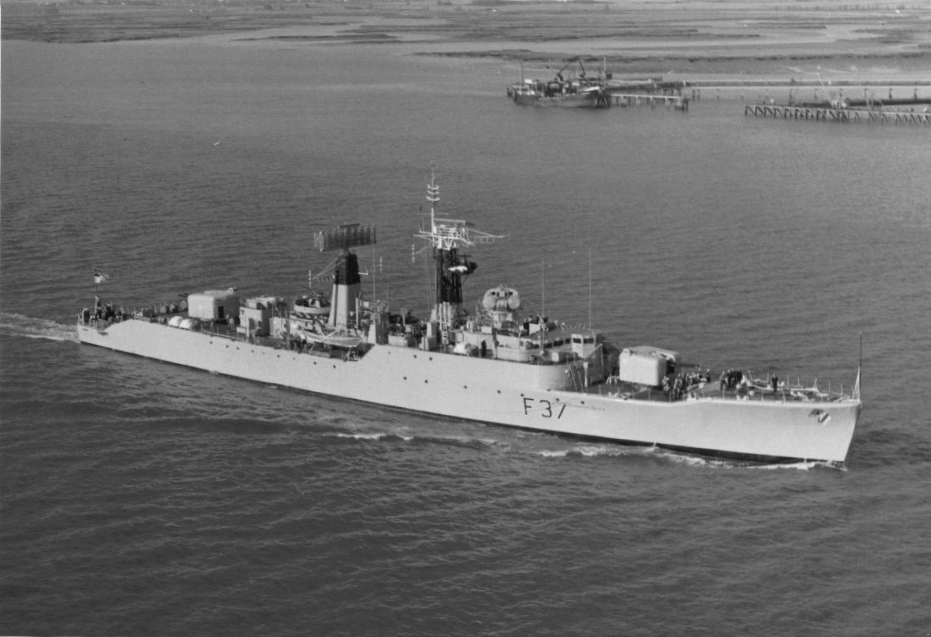
- HMS Jaguar, another Leopard-class frigate

History

United Kingdom
- Name: Lynx
- Ordered: 28 June 1951
- Builder: John Brown & Company
- Laid down: 13 August 1953
- Launched: 12 January 1955
- Commissioned: 14 March 1957
- Identification: Pennant number F 27
- Fate: Sold to Bangladesh 12 March 1982

History

Bangladesh
- Name: BNS Abu Bakr
- Acquired: 12 March 1982
- Decommissioned: 22 January 2014
- In service: 1982-2014
- Fate: Scrapped 2014

General characteristics
- Class & type: Leopard-class frigate
- Length: 101 metres (331 ft)
- Beam: 10.6 metres (35 ft)
- Draught: 3 metres (9.8 ft)
- Propulsion: 2 × type 12 E 390V diesels; 14,400 hp (m) (10.6 MW) sustained; 2 shafts
- Speed: 18 knots (33 km/h; 21 mph)
- Range: 2,200 miles (3,500 km) at 18 kn
- Complement: 200 (22 officers)
- Sensors & processing systems: Radar System: Surface/Air search: Type 960; Air search: Type 965 AKE-1; Type 293/993 target indication radar; Navigation: Type 974 /978; Fire control: Type 275 on director Mark 6M; Sonar system: Type 174 search sonar; Type 164 attack sonar
- Armament: 2 × twin 4.5 in guns Mark 6; 1 × twin 40 mm Bofors gun STAAG Mark 2; 1 × single 40 mm Bofors gun Mark 9; 1 × Squid A/S mortar

HMS Lynx (F27), was a Leopard-class Type 41 anti aircraft frigate of the Royal Navy, named after the lynx.

She was laid down by John Brown & Company, Clydebank, Scotland, on 13 August 1953, launched on 12 January 1955, and commissioned on 14 March 1957. On 12 March 1982 she was sold to the Bangladesh Navy and renamed BNS Abu Bakr. She was decommissioned and scrapped in 2014.

== Construction and design ==
The Leopard-class, or Type 41, frigates were designed for a main role of providing anti-aircraft protection for convoys. As such they were provided with a heavy gun armament but did not require high speed. They shared a common hull and machinery with the Salisbury-class (or Type 61) aircraft direction frigates.

Leopard was 339 ft 10 1/2 in (103.59 m) long overall, 330 ft 0 in (100.58 m) at the waterline and 320 ft 0 in (97.54 m), with a Beam of 40 ft 0 in (12.19 m) and a draught of 11 ft 10 in (3.61 m). Displacement was 2,300 long tons (2,300 t) standard and 2,520 long tons (2,560 t) deep load. She was powered by eight Admiralty Standard Range 1 (ASR1) diesel engines, with a total power of 14,400 brake horsepower (10,700 kW), driving two propeller shafts giving a speed of 25 knots (46 km/h; 29 mph). Four more of these engines were used to generate electricity, driving 500 kW alternators. The ship had a range of 2,300 nmi (2,600 mi; 4,300 km) at full power and 7,500 nmi (8,600 mi; 13,900 km) at 16 kn (18 mph; 30 km/h).

The ship's main gun armament consisted of two twin 4.5 inch (113 mm) Mark 6 dual-purpose gun turrets, mounted one forward and one aft, with a STAAG twin stabilised 40mm Bofors mount providing close-in anti-aircraft defence, although this mounting was unreliable and later replaced by a single Bofors gun. A single Squid anti submarine mortar was fitted. As built, Leopard was fitted with a Type 960 long-range radar on the ship's mainmast and Type 293Q surface/air search radar on the foremast. A Mark 6M fire control system (including a Type 275 radar) for the 4.5 inch guns was mounted above the ship's bridge, with a secondary CRBF (Close-Range Blind Fire) director aft, fitted with Type 262 Radar, while the STAAG mount was fitted with its own Type 262 fire control radar. while a Type 974 navigation radar was also fitted. Type 965 long-range air search radar replaced Type 960 during a refit in 1964 and 1966, with Type 993 surface/air search and target indication radar replaced the Type 293Q. The ship's sonar fit consisted of Type 174 search, Type 170 fire control sonar for Squid and a Type 162 sonar for classifying targets on the sea floor.

Lynx was laid down at John Brown & Company's Clydebank shipyard on 13 August 1953, was launched on 12 January 1955 by Mary, Princess Royal and commissioned on 14 March 1957, as the first of her class.

== Royal Navy service ==
On commissioning Lynx served as the leader of the 7th Frigate Squadron, with the squadron alternating between service in home waters and on the South Atlantic Station. On 3 May 1960, Lynx, carrying out trials off Portsmouth, was diverted to search for survivors after a small fishing boat was sunk in a collision with the German tanker Caperata. In September 1964, with tensions heightening between Britain and Argentina over the Falkland Islands sovereignty dispute, an Argentine light aircraft landed on Port Stanley racecourse, and its pilot, Miguel Fitzgerald, planted an Argentine flag and handed a written proclamation of Argentine sovereignty to an islander before flying back to Argentina. In response, Lynx, forming part of a task group off the coast of South America, was ordered to the Falklands, remaining there from 14 October to 11 November.

In March 1967, following the disbanding of the South Atlantic station, Lynx was the last Royal Navy ship based at the Simonstown naval base in South Africa, then transferring to the Far East. On 18 September 1970, Lynx found an abandoned 24 ft (7.3 m) long barge adrift off the coast of Johor, Malaysia and towed it back to Singapore. On 30 December 1972, the Japanese cargo ship Kyoryu Maru, carrying a cargo of timber from Selat Panjang to Singapore, sank after a collision with the Japanese tanker Shoen Maru, 30 nmi (35 mi; 56 km) from Singapore. Lynx, on patrol off Singapore, took part in the search for nine missing crewmembers from Kyoryu Maru. Lynx was paid off in June 1974, and after a refit at Rosyth, joined the Standby Squadron at Chatham. She attended the 1977 Silver Jubilee Fleet Review off Spithead.

== Bangladesh Navy service ==
She was transferred to the Bangladesh Navy 12 March 1982 and renamed BNS Abu Bakr. She was assigned to the Commodore Commanding BN Flotilla (COMBAN). About 200 personnel served aboard Abu Bakr, with most living aboard her.

In November 2008, BNS Abu Bakr along with BNS Nirbhoy and BNS Madhumati intercepted Myanmar Navy ships at a disputed region of Bay of Bengal where they were supporting an exploration of oil and gas fields.

She was decommissioned during a ceremony held in her homeport Chittagong on 22 January 2014. She was replaced by a Chinese Type 053H2 frigate with the same name and pennant number.

== See also ==
- List of historic ships of the Bangladesh Navy

== Bibliography ==
- Blackman, Raymond V.B. (1971). Jane's Fighting Ships 1971–72. London: Sampson Low, Marston & Co., Ltd.
- Burden, Rodney A.; Draper, Michael A.; Rough, Douglas A.; Smith, Colin A.; Wilton, David (1986). Falklands: The Air War. Twickenham, UK: British Air Review Group. ISBN 0-906339-05-7.
- Casualty Return: Merchant Ships Totally Lost, Broken Up, Etc., During the Quarter Ended 31st December 1972 (as reported up to 30 May, 1973 (PDF). London: Lloyd's Register of Shipping. September 1973.
- Colledge, J. J.; Warlow, Ben (2006) [1969]. Ships of the Royal Navy: The Complete Record of All Fighting Ships of the Royal Navy from the 15th Century to the Present (3rd Rev ed.). London: Chatham Publishing. ISBN 978-1-86176-281-8. OCLC 67375475.
- Critchley, Mike (1992). British Warships Since 1945: Part 5: Frigates. Liskeard, UK: Maritime Press. ISBN 0-907771-13-0.
- Friedman, Norman (2008). British Destroyers & Frigates: The Second World War and After. Barnsley, UK: Seaforth Publishing. ISBN 978-1-84832-015-4.
- Gardiner, Robert; Chumbley, Stephen, eds. (1995). Conway's All The World's Fighting Ships 1947–1995. Annapolis, Maryland, USA: Naval Institute Press. ISBN 1-55750-132-7.
- Marriott, Leo (1983). Royal Navy Frigates 1945–1983. Shepperton, Surrey, UK: Ian Allan Publishing. ISBN 0-7110-1322-5.
- Roberts, John (2009). Safeguarding the Nation: The Story of the Modern Royal Navy. Annapolis, Maryland, US: Naval Institute Press. ISBN 978-1-59114-812-8.
