= Peter Cazalet (Royal Navy officer) =

Royal Navy Vice Admiral (1899-1982)

Vice-Admiral Sir Peter Cazalet KBE CB DSO DSC
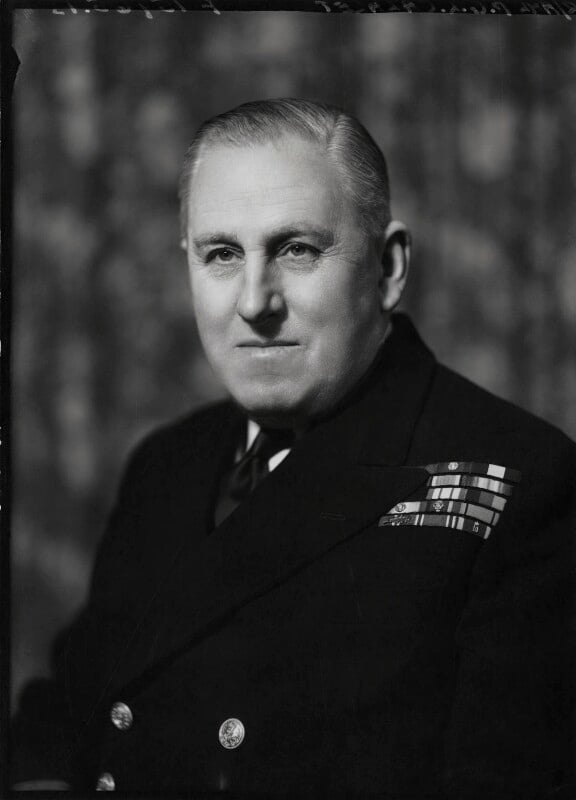
- Cazalet in 1953
- Born: 29 July 1899
- Died: 17 February 1982 (aged 82)
- Military career
- Allegiance: United Kingdom
- Branch: Royal Navy
- Service years: 1917–1957
- Rank: Vice-Admiral
- Commands: HMS Durban; 23rd Destroyer Flotilla; HMS London; Royal Naval Barracks Chatham; Reserve Fleet
- Conflicts: World War I World War II
- Awards: Knight Commander of the Order of the British Empire; Companion of the Order of the Bath; Distinguished Service Order; Distinguished Service Cross

Vice-Admiral Sir Peter Grenville Lyon Cazalet KBE CB DSO DSC (29 July 1899 – 17 February 1982) was a senior Royal Navy officer who commanded the Reserve Fleet.

== Naval career ==
Cazalet joined the Royal Navy in 1917 and served as a midshipman in the battlecruiser HMS Princess Royal during World War I. He also served in World War II and was awarded the Distinguished Service Cross in July 1940.

He became Commanding Officer of the cruiser HMS Durban in the Eastern Fleet in 1941 and saw action during the fall of Singapore. He continued his war service as Commander of the 23rd Destroyer Flotilla from 1944.

He became deputy director of Plans at the Admiralty in 1946, Commanding Officer of the cruiser HMS London in 1949 and Commodore at the Royal Naval Barracks Chatham in 1949. He went on to be Chief of Staff to the Flag Officer, Central Europe in 1950, Allied Chief of Staff to the Commander-in-Chief, Mediterranean Fleet in 1953 and Flag Officer commanding the Reserve Fleet in 1955 before retiring in 1957.

In retirement he was Chairman of the Navy League from 1960 to 1967 and deputy chairman of BP, where he was involved in negotiations relating to a trans-Atlantic pipeline.

He was appointed a Companion of the Order of the Bath (CB) in the 1952 New Year Honours and a Knight Commander of the Order of the British Empire (KBE) in the 1955 Birthday Honours.

Military offices
Preceded by Sir John Eaton	Commander-in-Chief, Reserve Fleet; 1955–1956	Succeeded by Sir Richard Onslow
