= Neville Purvis =

Vice Admiral Sir Neville Purvis KCB
- Born: 8 May 1936 (age 90)
- Military career
- Allegiance: United Kingdom
- Branch: Royal Navy
- Service years: 1953–1994
- Rank: Vice Admiral
- Commands: Director-General, Future Material Projects; Director-General, Naval Manpower and Training; Chief of Fleet Support
- Awards: Knight Commander of the Order of the Bath

Vice Admiral Sir Neville Purvis KCB (born 8 May 1936) is a former Royal Navy officer who ended his career as Chief of Fleet Support.

== Naval career ==
Educated at Charterhouse School, Selwyn College, Cambridge, and the Royal Naval College, Dartmouth, Purvis joined the Royal Navy in 1953 and specialized as a submariner. Promoted to rear admiral, he was appointed Director-General, Future Material Projects in 1987 and Director-General, Naval Manpower and Training in 1988 and then, having been promoted to vice admiral, he served as Chief of Fleet Support from 1991 until his retirement in 1994.

In retirement he became Director General of the British Standards Institution (BSI) and thereafter Chief Executive of the British Safety Council and, more recently, a Trustee of the Wellington Trust, a charity formed to preserve the sloop HMS Wellington. He lives at Bramley in Surrey.

Military offices
Preceded by Sir Jock Slater	Chief of Fleet Support; 1991–1994	Succeeded by Sir Toby Frere
