= HMS Jupiter (F60) =

1969 Type 12I or Leander-class frigate of the Royal Navy

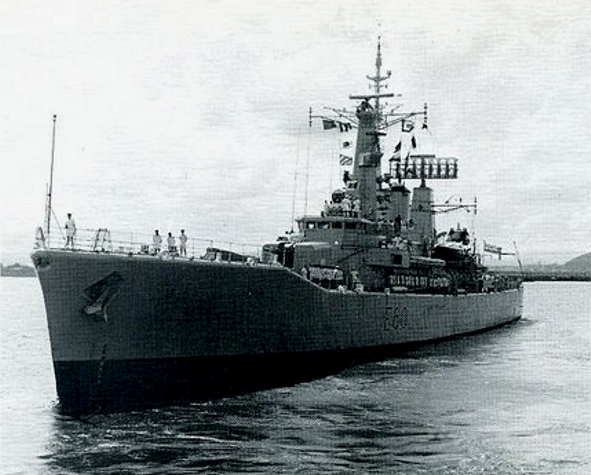
- HMS Jupiter

History

United Kingdom
- Name: HMS Jupiter
- Namesake: Jupiter
- Builder: Yarrow Shipbuilders
- Laid down: 3 October 1966
- Launched: 4 September 1967
- Commissioned: 9 August 1969
- Decommissioned: 22 April 1992
- Identification: F60
- Fate: Sold for scrap, 1997

General characteristics
- Class & type: Leander-class frigate
- Displacement: 3,200 long tons (3,251 t) full load
- Length: 113.4 m (372 ft)
- Beam: 12.5 m (41 ft)
- Draught: 5.8 m (19 ft)
- Propulsion: 2 × Babcock & Wilcox boilers supplying steam to two sets of White-English Electric double-reduction geared turbines to two shafts
- Speed: 28 knots (52 km/h)
- Range: 4,600 nautical miles (8,500 km) at 15 knots (28 km/h)
- Complement: 223
- Armament: As built: 1 × twin 4.5 inch (114 mm) guns; 1 × quadruple Sea Cat anti-aircraft missile launchers; 1 × Limbo anti-submarine mortar; From 1980: 4 × Exocet anti-ship missile launchers; 1 × GWS 25 Sea Wolf anti-aircraft missile launcher; 2 × single 40 mm Bofors anti-aircraft guns; 2 × triple torpedo tubes
- Aircraft carried: 1 × Westland Wasp helicopter; From 1980: 1 × Lynx helicopter

HMS Jupiter (F60) was a Batch 3 Leander-class frigate of the Royal Navy (RN). She was, like the rest of the class, named after a figure of mythology. Built by Yarrow Shipbuilders of Scotstoun, she was launched on 4 September 1967 and commissioned on 9 August 1969.

== Service history ==
=== 1970s ===
In 1970, HMS Jupiter deployed to the West Indies. In 1971, she joined Standing Naval Force Atlantic (STANAVFORLANT), a multi-national squadron of NATO. In 1972, Jupiter was again present in the West Indies as part of STANAVFORLANT taking over the duty of HMS Naiad which had suffered a mechanical breakdown. The following year, Jupiter took part in the Second Cod War. On 26 May 1973, she and her Wasp helicopter assisted the British trawler Everton, which was taking water after being hit by naval gunfire from the Icelandic gunboat Ægir. Jupiter then visited Africa on her way to the Far East and Pacific, and carried out a variety of duties, including performing fly-the-flag visits to numerous ports. Jupiter also visited Christchurch, New Zealand during the 1974 Commonwealth Games and the American naval base at Pearl Harbor where some propulsion problems were sorted out. Charles, Prince of Wales joined Jupiter as Ship's Communications Officer in January 1974 and remained until her return to the UK later that year.

In late 1976, Jupiter joined the 7th Frigate Squadron as Captain F7, Jupiter led the 7th Frigate Squadron in the annual Group Deployment (Group 5 - January to May 1977, led by FOF2 in the cruiser Tiger), performing naval exercises and visiting the Caribbean Sea and Rio de Janeiro and Salvador, Brazil in April 1977 and Funchal, Madeira. She also took part in the Fleet Review at Spithead on 28 June 1977, in celebration of Queen Elizabeth II's Silver Jubilee. After the Fleet Review, frigates of the 7th Frigate Squadron visited different ports in south Wales, Jupiter visiting Cardiff in early July 1977. Later that year, Jupiter became the Gibraltar Guard ship and in 1979 represented the United Kingdom in the Siege of Savannah 200th Anniversary.

Jupiter also enjoyed fame on BBC TV, through starring as HMS Hero in the acclaimed drama series Warship. All members of the crew were given HMS Hero cap tallies for filming purposes. The main ship used for filming was, however, HMS Phoebe.

=== 1980s ===
In 1980, Jupiter's modernisation commenced, and included the addition of the Sea Wolf missile system, as well as the removal of her twin 4.5-inch (114 mm) gun turret in favour of the Exocet anti-ship missile. The boilers were modified to the Babcock & Wilcox Y160 Steam Atomisation type water-tube boiler. the modernisation was completed in 1983.

On 13 June 1984, as she was leaving the Pool of London after a visit to the capital, she collided with London Bridge, causing significant damage to both ship and bridge. The ship's captain, Commander Colin Hamilton, was later court martialled at Portsmouth on 4 December 1984. Hamilton was severely reprimanded.

In September 1986, Jupiter was part of the NATO exercise "Autumn Train '86'" and visited Gibraltar, then spent a continuous four weeks in the Mediterranean Sea, and returned to Gibraltar prior to returning to her (then) home base of Plymouth. Jupiter changed her home port to Portsmouth in 1985. She was a member of the 7th Frigate Squadron.

In 1986, Jupiter deployed to the Persian Gulf—the Armilla Patrol—in partnership with HMY Britannia, HMS Newcastle and RFA Brambleleaf, and while there, helped in the evacuation of British and Commonwealth nationals from the People's Democratic Republic of Yemen after a campaign to overthrow the government of that country began. Her exploits were broadcast by the BBC World Service.

During the Armilla Patrol, Jupiter paid courtesy calls to Gibraltar, Djibouti, Aqaba, Doha, Muscat, and Mombasa, and returned via the Suez Canal and Piraeus. After a transit of the Corinth Canal.

Between 1984 and 1986, Jupiter also visited Bremerhaven, Amsterdam, Bordeaux and Middlesbrough. In September 1986, she was Guard ship to the Tall Ships Race visit to Newcastle upon Tyne.

Jupiter was twinned with the town of Middlesbrough in North East England.

=== 1990s ===
During the First Gulf War, Jupiter was on Armilla Patrol, which was created in 1980 in response to the increased danger posed by the Iran–Iraq War to British interests. Her last deployment came in late 1991 to early 1992 when she deployed to the South Atlantic as the Guard ship and returned via Rio de Janeiro and Barbados where she carried out anti drug patrols. Jupiter decommissioned in 1992 after a final visit to her affiliated town of Middlesbrough. She was sold for scrap in 1997 and towed to Alang in India to be beached and broken up.

== See also ==
- Warship (TV series)
- HMS Hero
- Royal Navy

== Publications ==
- Colledge, J. J.; Warlow, Ben (2006) [1969]. Ships of the Royal Navy: The Complete Record of All Fighting Ships of the Royal Navy from the 15th Century to the Present (3rd Rev ed.). London: Chatham Publishing. ISBN 978-1-86176-281-8. OCLC 67375475.
- Marriott, Leo, 1983. Royal Navy Frigates 1945-1983, Ian Allan Ltd. ISBN 07110 1322 5
