= HMS St Austell Bay =

1945 Bay-class anti-aircraft frigate of the Royal Navy

History

United Kingdom
- Name: HMS St Austell Bay
- Namesake: St Austell Bay
- Builder: Harland & Wolff, Belfast
- Yard number: 1249
- Laid down: 30 May 1944
- Launched: 18 November 1944
- Completed: 29 May 1945
- Commissioned: 29 May 1945
- Decommissioned: August 1956
- Identification: Pennant number K634
- Motto: In omnia promptus; ("Ready for anything")
- Fate: Sold for scrapping, 1959
- Badge: On a Field Red, a saltire couped ragulee Gold

General characteristics
- Class & type: Bay-class frigate
- Displacement: 1,600 long tons (1,626 t) standard; 2,530 long tons (2,571 t) full
- Length: 286 ft (87 m) p/p; 307 ft 3 in (93.65 m) o/a
- Beam: 38 ft 6 in (11.73 m)
- Draught: 12 ft 9 in (3.89 m)
- Propulsion: 2 × Admiralty 3-drum boilers, 2 shafts, 4-cylinder vertical triple expansion reciprocating engines, 5,500 ihp (4,100 kW)
- Speed: 19.5 knots (36.1 km/h; 22.4 mph)
- Range: 724 tons oil fuel, 9,500 nmi (17,600 km) at 12 knots (22 km/h)
- Complement: 157
- Sensors & processing systems: Type 285 fire control radar; Type 291 air warning radar; Type 276 target indication radar; High Frequency Direction Finder (HF/DF); IFF transponder
- Armament: 4 × QF 4 inch Mark XVI guns on 2 twin mounting HA/LA Mk.XIX; 4 × 40 mm Bofors A/A on 2 twin mounts Mk.V; 4 × 20 mm Oerlikon A/A on 2 twin mounts Mk.V; 1 × Hedgehog 24 barrel A/S projector; 2 rails and 4 throwers for 50 depth charges

HMS St Austell Bay was a Bay-class anti-aircraft frigate of the British Royal Navy, named after St Austell Bay on the south coast of Cornwall. In commission from 1945 until 1956, she served in the Mediterranean Fleet and on the America and West Indies Squadron.

== Construction ==
The ship was originally ordered from Harland and Wolff of Belfast on 2 February 1943 as the Loch-class frigate Loch Lydoch. However the contract was then changed, and the ship was built to a revised design as a Bay-class anti-aircraft frigate, launched on 18 November 1944, and completed on 29 May 1945.

== Service history ==
After commissioning and sea trials St Austell Bay was assigned to duty in the British Pacific Fleet. However, she was still at Malta with other ships of the 33rd Escort Group when news of the surrender of Japan arrived on 15 August. St Austell Bay remained in the Mediterranean Sea for the next five years, mainly operating in the Aegean and Adriatic, on patrols, guardship duties, and several periods as part of the Haifa Patrol, attempting to intercept ships carrying illegal Jewish immigrants to Palestine.

In April 1950 St Austell Bay and sister ship Veryan Bay exchanged with the Royal New Zealand Navy frigates Hawea and Taupo, arriving at Auckland on 3 July to join the RNZN 11th Frigate Flotilla for exercises, patrols and visits in the Pacific, finally returning to the flotilla at Malta on 4 January 1951.

In March she returned to the UK for service in the 7th Frigate Flotilla, Home Fleet, and almost immediately took part on the search for the missing submarine Affray. Patrols, visits, and fleet exercises occupied the rest of the year, including an exercise with a submarine of the Royal Norwegian Navy in September.

In June 1952 she arrived at Hamilton, Bermuda, to join the America and West Indies Squadron, and in July was sent to Port Stanley to act as Guardship in the Falkland Islands. In October she left the Falklands and sailed up the west coast of South America, making calls at Puerto Montt, Valparaíso and Antofagasta in Chile, and Callao in Peru, before transiting the Panama Canal, and returning to Bermuda in December.

In 1953 she visited various Caribbean ports, and carried out exercises, including one in May with ships of the Royal Canadian Navy. In June she sailed to Devonport to refit, then returned to Bermuda in November. From March to June 1954 she was Guardship at the Falklands, again returning to Bermuda by way of the Pacific coast of South America. In September she visited the United States, calling at ports in New England, then returned to the UK in November to refit at Plymouth.

St Austell Bay was recommissioned in May 1955, but significant problems with the refit delayed deployment until November when she returned to Bermuda for the usual programme of joint exercises, training and port visits in the Caribbean and to North America. She returned to Plymouth in August 1956 to decommission and was put into Reserve. St Austell Bay remained in the Reserve Fleet at Plymouth until 1959 when she was placed on the Disposal List. She was sold to BISCO for demolition by Shipbreaking Industries and arrived in tow at the breakers yard at Charlestown near Rosyth on 5 July 1959.

== Publications ==
- Colledge, J. J.; Warlow, Ben (2006) [1969]. Ships of the Royal Navy: The Complete Record of All Fighting Ships of the Royal Navy from the 15th Century to the Present (3rd Rev ed.). London: Chatham Publishing. ISBN 978-1-86176-281-8. OCLC 67375475.
