= John Eaton (Royal Navy officer) =

Royal Navy Vice Admiral (1902–1981)

Vice-Admiral Sir John Eaton KBE CB DSO DSC
- Born: 3 November 1902; Bulawayo, Rhodesia
- Died: 21 July 1981 (aged 78); Kelvedon, Essex
- Military career
- Allegiance: United Kingdom
- Branch: Royal Navy
- Service years: 1916–1958
- Rank: Vice-Admiral
- Commands: America and West Indies Station (1955–56); Reserve Fleet (1954–55); HM Australian Fleet (1951–53); HMS St Vincent (1945–47); HMS Sheffield (1945); HMS Eskimo (1942–43); HMS Somali (1942); HMS Mohawk (1939–41); HMS Venetia (1939); HMS Boreas (1936–39); HMS Westminster (1935–36)
- Conflicts: First World War; Second World War
- Awards: Knight Commander of the Order of the British Empire; Companion of the Order of the Bath; Distinguished Service Order; Distinguished Service Cross; Mentioned in Despatches (2)

Vice-Admiral Sir John Willson Musgrave Eaton, KBE, CB, DSO, DSC (3 November 1902 – 21 July 1981) was a Royal Navy officer who served as Commander-in-Chief America and West Indies Station from 1955 to 1956.

== Naval career ==
Eaton joined the Royal Navy in 1916 and served in the First World War. After the war he served in destroyers and then in submarines.

Eaton served in the Second World War and commanded the destroyers HMS Venetia, HMS Mohawk, HMS Somali and HMS Eskimo.

After the war he became Captain of the cruiser HMS Sheffield and then Captain of the training school HMS St Vincent. He was appointed Director at the Royal Navy Staff College, Greenwich in 1949, Flag Officer commanding HM Australian Fleet in 1951 and Flag Officer commanding the Reserve Fleet in 1954. His last appointment was as Commander-in-Chief, America and West Indies Station and Deputy Supreme Allied Commander Atlantic in 1955; he took part in Operation Strikeback (a major NATO training exercise) in 1957 and retired in 1958.

His life is commemorated by an inscription at the Church of St. Mary the Virgin in Kelvedon in Essex.

Military offices
Preceded by Sir John Stevens	Commander-in-Chief, America and West Indies Station; 1955–1956	Succeeded by Sir Wilfrid Woods as Deputy Supreme Allied Commander Atlantic
Preceded by Sir Ian Campbell	Commander-in-Chief, Reserve Fleet; 1954–1955	Succeeded by Sir Peter Cazalet
Preceded by John Eccles	Flag Officer Commanding HM Australian Fleet; 1951–1953	Succeeded by Roy Dowling
