= Charles Norris (Royal Navy officer) =

Royal Navy Vice Admiral (1900-1989)

Vice-Admiral Sir Charles Norris KBE CB DSO
- Norris c. 1950
- Born: Charles Fred Wivell Norris; 16 December 1900; Erith, Kent
- Died: 17 December 1989 (aged 89)
- Military career
- Allegiance: United Kingdom
- Branch: Royal Navy
- Service years: 1913–1956
- Rank: Vice-Admiral
- Commands: Far East Fleet
- Conflicts: World War I World War II
- Awards: Knight Commander of the Order of the British Empire; Companion of the Order of the Bath; Distinguished Service Order

Vice-Admiral Sir Charles Fred Wivell Norris KBE CB DSO (16 December 1900 – 17 December 1989) was a Royal Navy officer who went on to be Commander-in-Chief, Far East Fleet.

== Naval career ==
Norris joined the Royal Navy in 1913. He served in World War I and took part in the Battle of Jutland in 1916. After the War he became a student at Cambridge University.

He also served in World War II as Second in Command of HMS Sheffield and then as Commander on HMS Bellona from 1943. He took part in the Normandy landings on Omaha Beach in 1944 and in the Murmansk Convoys in the Winter 1944 to 1945.

In 1948 he became Captain of the Fleet for the Home Fleet and in 1950 he was appointed Director of Naval Training and Deputy Chief of Naval Personnel, (Training) at the Admiralty. He was made Flag Officer Flotillas, Mediterranean, at Malta in 1953 and Commander-in-Chief, East Indies in 1954; he retired on 10 December 1956.

In retirement he became a Director of the British Productivity Council.

Military offices
Preceded by Sir William Slayter	Commander-in-Chief, East Indies Station; 1954–1956	Succeeded by Sir Hilary Biggs
