= Veryan Bay =

Bay on the south coast of Cornwall, England

Coordinates: 50°13′N 4°50′W

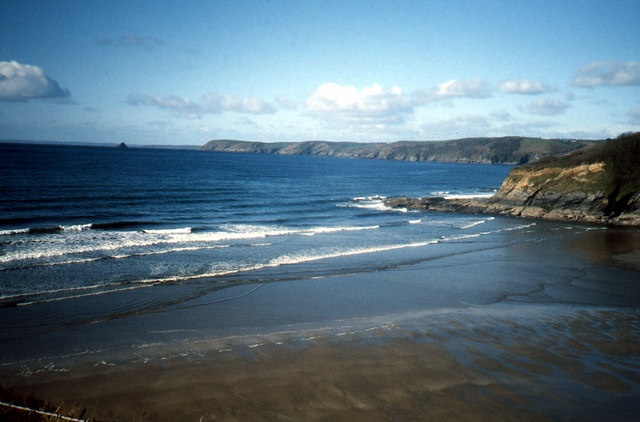
Porthluney Cove

Veryan Bay along the southern coast of Cornwall, England, is a curving, natural bay that stretches for 4.6 miles in width and recedes by up to 1.5 miles. It lies between the Peneare Head to the west and Dodman Point at the east. The shoreline varies in height from 20 to 200 feet, with indentations forming bights. Along the bay is Porthluney Cove, which is overlooked by Caerhays Castle.

== See also ==
- HMS Veryan Bay (K651)
