= HMS Argonaut (F56) =

1967 Type 12I or Leander-class frigate of the Royal Navy

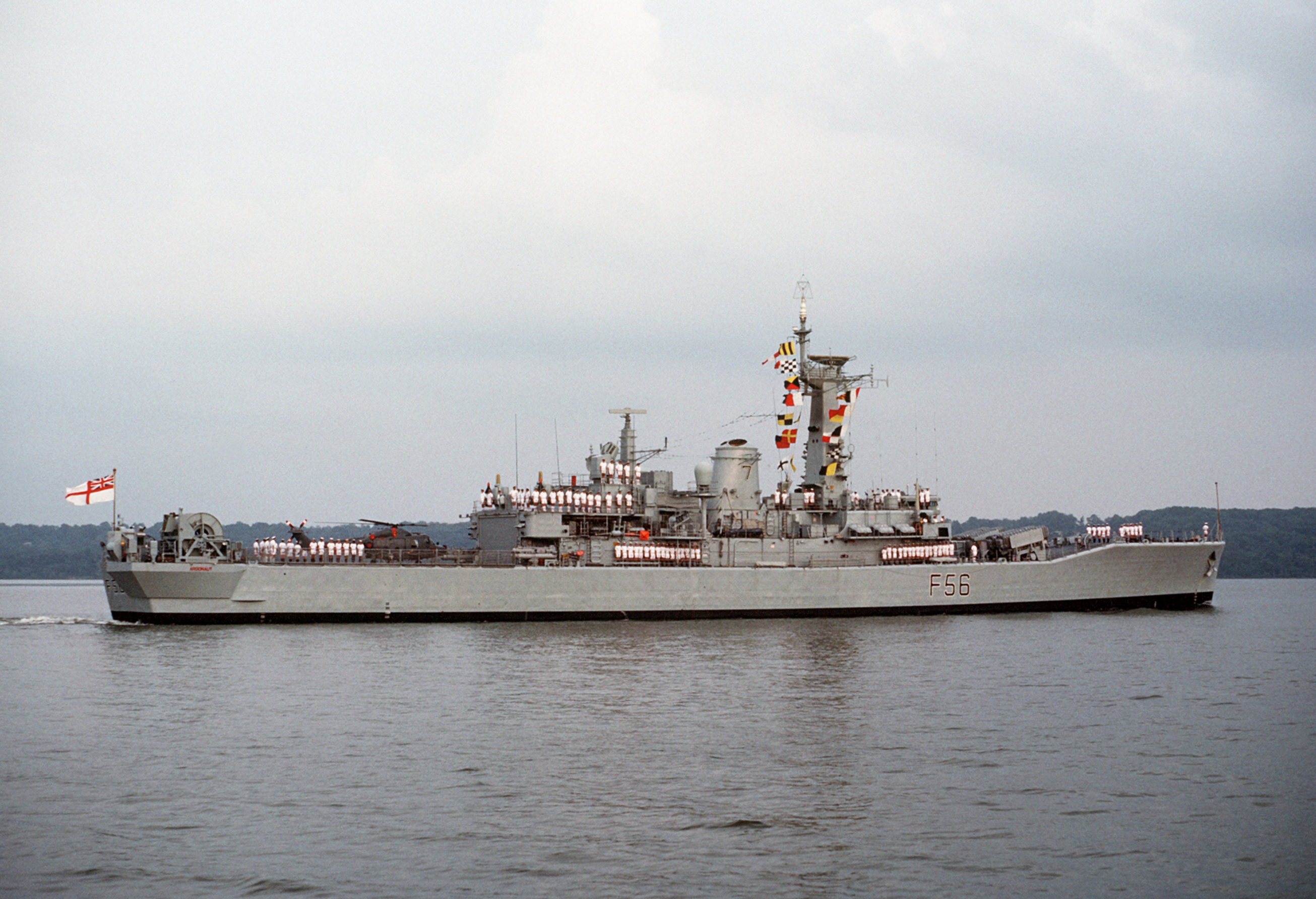
- HMS Argonaut in 1985

History

United Kingdom
- Name: HMS Argonaut
- Builder: Hawthorn Leslie and Company
- Laid down: 27 November 1964
- Launched: 8 February 1966
- Commissioned: 17 August 1967
- Decommissioned: 31 March 1993
- Identification: Pennant number F56
- Honours and awards: Falklands War
- Fate: Scrapped in 1995

General characteristics
- Class & type: Leander-class frigate
- Displacement: 3,200 long tons (3,251 t) full load
- Length: 113.4 m (372 ft)
- Beam: 12.5 m (41 ft)
- Draught: 5.8 m (19 ft)
- Propulsion: 2 × Babcock & Wilcox boilers supplying steam to two sets of White-English Electric double-reduction geared turbines to two shafts
- Speed: 28 knots (52 km/h)
- Range: 4,600 nautical miles (8,500 km) at 15 knots (28 km/h)
- Complement: 223
- Armament: As built: 1 × twin 4.5 inch (114 mm) guns; 1 × quadruple Sea Cat anti-aircraft missile launchers; 1 × Limbo anti-submarine mortar; From 1980: 4 × Exocet anti-ship missile launchers; 2 × quadruple Seacat anti-aircraft missile launchers; 2 × single 40 mm Bofors anti-aircraft guns; 2 × triple torpedo tubes
- Aircraft carried: 1 × Westland Wasp helicopter; From 1980: 1 × Lynx helicopter

HMS Argonaut (F56) was a Leander-class frigate that served with the Royal Navy from 1967 to 1993. She took part in the Falklands War in 1982, sustaining damage and casualties in action.

== Construction ==
The ship was built at Hebburn, in Tyneside, by the Hawthorn Leslie and Company shipyard in the mid-1960s. She was launched on 8 February 1966, and commissioned into the Royal Navy on 17 August 1967.

== Service history ==
=== 1967–1982 ===
In her first year Argonaut escorted the ocean liner RMS Queen Mary on her last voyage across the North Atlantic Ocean to a permanent berth to serve as a hotel/tourist attraction in California, United States.

In 1968 Argonaut joined NATO (STANAVFORLANT)

In 1969 Argonaut, with other Royal Navy vessels, sailed with the "Beira Patrol", a United Nations operation preventing the importation of oil by Rhodesia as a part of the British Government's economic sanctions against that country.

In 1969 in an eleven-month deployment "Argonaut" circumnavigated the globe, visiting multiple countries, and also conducted a famine relief operation to FIJI(SUVA)

In 1973, Argonaut was recommissioned, completed a six-week work up at Portland, visited Brest, France and then served as a guard ship for the Gibraltar station. Following Iceland's declaration of a 200-mile fishing limit, Argonaut carried out fishery protection duties for British fishing trawlers inside the zone, in what became known as the "Second Cod War".

In 1974 from mid January, Argonaut spent nine months as part of the group deployment named 'Task Group 317.1', led by Flag Officer Second Flotilla (Commander Task Group 317.1). The other ships in the task group were the County-class destroyer HMS Fife, the frigates of the 7th Frigate Squadron (of which Argonaut was one): HMS Ariadne, HMS Danae, HMS Londonderry, and HMS Scylla (Captain 7th Frigate Squadron), and two Royal Fleet Auxiliaries (one tanker and one solid stores). In November 1974 Argonaut carried out fishery protection duties in the Barents Sea. During this period she visited Hammerfest and Honningsvåg in Norway to take on fuel. Before returning to Devonport she visited Newcastle upon Tyne.

In early 1975 Argonaut took part in the annual NATO 'Gate' naval exercise (called 'Locked Gate' or 'Open Gate' in alternating years), and visited Lisbon before returning to Devonport. Argonaut joined the Standing Naval Force Atlantic (Stanavforlant) by late 1975. Argonaut underwent Exocet modernisation between 1976 and 1980, giving her a potent anti-ship capability. In 1981, Argonaut deployed as the Armilla Patrol ship in the Persian Gulf.

== Falklands War ==
On 2 April 1982 the Falkland Islands were invaded by the armed forces of Argentina. At the direction of Her Majesty's Government, an advanced group of Royal Naval vessels began to steam towards Ascension Island. On 19 April 1982 Argonaut, along with Ardent and two Royal Fleet Auxiliary ships Regent and Plumleaf headed for Ascension Island, arriving on 29 April 1982. On 6 May 1982 the Argonaut Group departed the island heading South for the Falklands, joining the Amphibious Group centred on Fearless and Intrepid, on 16 May, and the Carrier Battle Group on 18 May 1982.

On 21 May 1982 Argonaut, along with other destroyers and frigates, provided close escort for amphibious vessels during the opposed arrival at San Carlos by British Forces, with Argonaut standing off the "Fanning Head" headland within Falkland Sound guarding the Northern approaches to the operational area. Whilst this operation was underway, she was attacked by Argentine warplanes throughout the day, which Argonaut engaged with anti-aircraft weapons. Two of the air attacks succeeded in damaging Argonaut.

The first at 10:15 was an improvised assault from a lone Argentine aircraft, piloted by Lt. Guillermo Owen Crippa flying an Aermacchi MB-339 from the Argentine Navy's 1st Naval Air Attack Squadron, who had been despatched on a reconnaissance flight over Falkland Sound, to ascertain the veracity of reports received from an Argentine Army post present at San Carlos. Spotting the landing underway, Crippa attacked Argonaut with cannon fire and rockets, causing damage to her Type 965 radar.

The second air attack was made at 13.37 by five A-4 Skyhawks from the Argentinian Air Force's 5th Air Brigade, which hit her with two bombs. Neither exploded, although one killed two sailors when it entered the ship's Sea Cat missile magazine and detonated two missiles, while the other did severe damage to her boiler room, knocking out the ship's power and leaving her dead in the water. Plymouth came to the assistance of Argonaut. HMS Plymouth provided electrical power to the stricken vessel. The captain of Argonaut sent a signal which read "we are damaged and have lost power but we can still fight". The next day Argonaut was towed into San Carlos Water (later known as bomb alley) by 3 LSL vessels. Both bombs were still live and it took some days to defuse and remove them.

On 14 June Argentine forces on the Falkland Islands surrendered to the British task force. On 26 June 1982 Argonaut sailed back under her own steam to Devonport Dockyard, where she had her battle damage repaired and new sonar equipment fitted.

=== 1982–1993 ===
In 1987 Argonaut rescued the businessman/adventurer Richard Branson from the Atlantic Ocean after he had ditched at sea whilst trying to cross it in a hot-air balloon.

In 1990 Argonaut represented the Royal Navy at commemorations at the Gallipoli peninsula on the 75th Anniversary of the Gallipoli landings.

In August 1992 Argonaut was involved in the pursuit and arrest on the high seas in the South Atlantic Ocean of Roderick Newall, a former British Army officer who had murdered his parents in Jersey.

== Fate ==
Argonaut was decommissioned from the Royal Navy on 31 March 1993, and was laid up at Fareham Creek. On 25 January 1995 she left Portsmouth Harbour under tow to a port in Spain where she was broken up.

== Publications ==
- Colledge, J. J.; Warlow, Ben (2006) [1969]. Ships of the Royal Navy: The Complete Record of All Fighting Ships of the Royal Navy from the 15th Century to the Present (3rd Rev ed.). London: Chatham Publishing. ISBN 978-1-86176-281-8. OCLC 67375475.
- Marriott, Leo, 1983. Royal Navy Frigates 1945–1983, Ian Allan Ltd. ISBN 07110 1322 5
