= John Stevens (Royal Navy officer) =

Royal Navy Vice Admiral (1900–1989)

Vice-Admiral Sir John Stevens KBE CB
- Born: 1 June 1900
- Died: 10 December 1989 (aged 89)
- Military career
- Allegiance: United Kingdom
- Branch: Royal Navy
- Service years: 1918 – 1956
- Rank: Vice-Admiral
- Commands: HMS Cleopatra; HMS Implacable; Home Fleet Training Squadron; Commander-in-Chief, America and West Indies Station
- Conflicts: World War I World War II
- Awards: Knight Commander of the Order of the British Empire; Companion of the Order of the Bath

Vice-Admiral Sir John Felgate Stevens KBE CB (1 June 1900 – 10 December 1989) was a Royal Navy officer who went on to be Commander-in-Chief, America and West Indies Station.

== Naval career ==
Stevens joined the Royal Navy in 1918 and served in the closing stages of World War I. After the War he went to King's College, Cambridge, and then specialised in navigation.

He also served in World War II as captain of HMS Cleopatra from August 1942 to July 1943 and then became Director of Plans at the Admiralty in 1946. He was given command of HMS Implacable in 1948 and then became Director of Naval Training in 1949. He was appointed Chief of Staff to the Head of British Joint Services Mission to Washington, D.C., in 1950 and Flag Officer, Home Fleet Training Squadron, in 1952. He went on to be Commander-in-Chief, America and West Indies Station, and Deputy Supreme Allied Commander, Atlantic, in 1953. He retired in 1956.

Military offices
| Preceded by Sir William Andrewes | Commander-in-Chief, America and West Indies Station; 1953–1955 | Succeeded by Sir John Eaton |
