= HMS Veryan Bay =

1945 Bay-class anti-aircraft frigate of the Royal Navy

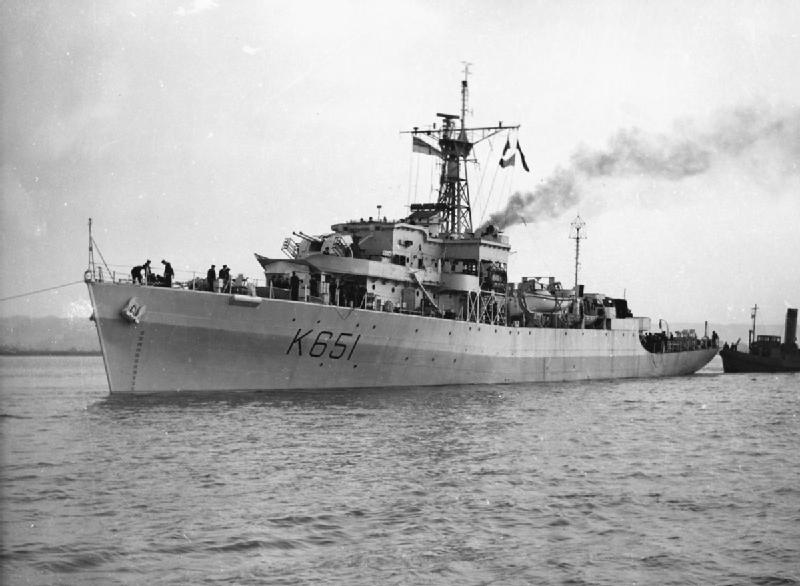

History

United Kingdom
- Name: HMS Veryan Bay
- Ordered: 6 March 1943
- Builder: Charles Hill & Sons, Bristol
- Yard number: 300
- Laid down: 8 June 1944
- Launched: 11 November 1944
- Completed: 13 May 1945
- Commissioned: 15 May 1945
- Decommissioned: 12 March 1957
- Identification: Pennant number K651/F651
- Fate: Sold for scrapping, 1959
- Badge: On a Field per fess wavy Green and barry wavy of 4 white and blue, an escallop white

General characteristics
- Class & type: Bay-class frigate
- Displacement: 1,600 long tons (1,626 t) standard; 2,530 long tons (2,571 t) full
- Length: 286 ft (87 m) p/p; 307 ft 3 in (93.65 m) o/a
- Beam: 38 ft 6 in (11.73 m)
- Draught: 12 ft 9 in (3.89 m)
- Propulsion: 2 × Admiralty 3-drum boilers, 2 shafts, 4-cylinder vertical triple expansion reciprocating engines, 5,500 ihp (4,100 kW)
- Speed: 19.5 knots (36.1 km/h; 22.4 mph)
- Range: 724 tons oil fuel, 9,500 nmi (17,600 km) at 12 knots (22 km/h)
- Complement: 157
- Sensors & processing systems: Type 285 fire control radar; Type 291 air warning radar; Type 276 target indication radar; High Frequency Direction Finder (HF/DF); IFF transponder
- Armament: 4 × QF 4-inch (102 mm) Mark XVI guns on 2 twin mounting HA/LA Mk.XIX; 4 × 40 mm Bofors A/A on 2 twin mounts Mk.V; 4 × 20 mm Oerlikon A/A on 2 twin mounts Mk.V; 1 × Hedgehog 24 barrel A/S projector; 2 rails and 4 throwers for 50 depth charges

HMS Veryan Bay was a Bay-class anti-aircraft frigate of the British Royal Navy, named after Veryan Bay on the south coast of Cornwall. In commission from 1945 until 1957, she saw service in the Pacific, Mediterranean, and Home Fleets, in the West Indies and in the South Atlantic.

== Construction ==
The ship was ordered from Charles Hill & Sons of Bristol on 6 March 1943 as Admiralty Job No. J600, and laid down on 8 June 1944 as the Loch-class frigate Loch Swannay. However the contract was then changed, and the ship was completed to a revised design as a Bay-class anti-aircraft frigate. Veryan Bay was launched on 11 November 1944, and completed on 13 May 1945.

== Service history ==
=== Pacific Fleet ===
Veryan Bay was commissioned for service on 15 May 1945 under the command of Lieutenant-Commander J.S. Brownrigg. After completing her sea trials, training, and weapons tests she sailed to join to the Escort Group of the British Pacific Fleet. She was at Malta engaged in exercises when the war ended in August, not joining the fleet at Singapore until October. She remained with the Escort Group, based at Hong Kong, into 1946, carrying out patrols in the South China Sea. She visited U.S. Naval Base Subic Bay in the Philippines in March, and travelled to HM Dockyard, Cockatoo Island, Sydney, for a refit in May and June, before visiting the Solomon Islands in August, and in November was deployed off Batavia to support military operations against nationalists opposed to the resumption of Dutch colonial rule. In early 1947 she was deployed with the Flotilla for local patrols and exercises with the Fleet, and made a visit to Japan in March.

=== Mediterranean Fleet ===
On 21 March 1947 Veryan Bay was transferred to the Mediterranean Fleet, sailing via the Indian Ocean and Suez Canal, and arriving on 2 May to join the 2nd Escort Flotilla. A new Commanding Officer, Captain R.S. Wellby, was appointed three days later. The ship was then deployed to prevent the illegal immigration of European Jews to Palestine. She sailed to Leghorn on the west coast of Italy to watch for the ship SS President Warfield, now renamed SS Exodus, then sailed to Piraeus in June, before returning to Malta. After a refit at Gibraltar Dockyard in July, she returned to the Palestine Patrol, based at Haifa, in August. In November she sailed to Trieste to act as guardship until January 1948.

After local exercises at Malta in February, and then a refit (at which time her pennant number was changed to F651), Veryan Bay was deployed to patrol in the Red Sea in April and May, before returning to the Palestine Patrol, based at Cyprus, then to Trieste for further guardship duty. On 13 December Captain H.C.N. Rolfe assumed command of the ship, and early in the new year a complement of Boy ratings joined for training. After guardship duty at Aqaba in January and February 1949, she returned to Malta for exercises and a new Commanding Officer, Captain G.T. Lambert, in April. Veryan Bay remained at Malta taking part in Flotilla and Fleet exercises and visits, with further spells of duty as guardship at Trieste and Aqaba, until April 1950.

Under her new commanding officer, Commander J.F.R. Crews, she was transferred on loan with the Royal New Zealand Navy, along with sister ship St Austell Bay, exchanging with the frigates Hawea and Taupo. She arrived at Auckland on 3 July to join the 11th Frigate Flotilla. There she made visits to various ports and carried out exercises with other RNZN ships, eventually leaving on 28 October, and arriving back at Malta on 4 January 1951.

=== Home Fleet ===
After a refit in February and March at HM Dockyard, Malta, the ship was transferred to the 7th Frigate Flotilla, Home Fleet, arriving at Plymouth on 21 April. After Fleet exercises at Invergordon, she took part in convoy defence exercises in the English Channel, and visited Cherbourg, Penzance and Swanage. In September the ship called at Holyhead while en route to Derry for joint anti-submarine exercises in the North West Approaches. In December, after her annual inspection, she sailed to Plymouth to refit.

=== West Indies Squadron ===
In January 1952 command was assumed by Commander R. Horncastle. She then sailed to Bermuda, arriving on 18 February, to join the West Indies Squadron. She was promptly despatched to the Falkland Islands to act as guardship at Port Stanley, arriving in early April. In June she left the islands, taking a cargo of penguins, destined for Vancouver Zoo, to Montevideo for air transport to Canada. She spent August–September deployed in the West Indies for Flotilla duties and exercises, and in October returned to the UK and was paid-off to refit.

Veryan Bay was recommissioned on 5 March 1953 for service in the 7th Frigate Squadron in the West Indies, under the command of Captain R.G.W. Hare. She arrived at Bermuda on 30 April, and in June was at Kingston, Jamaica for ceremonies for the Coronation of Queen Elizabeth II. The ship then visited Antigua, Barbados, Grenada, Puerto Cabello, Trinidad, Recife and Montevideo while en route to the Falklands for another tour as guardship, arriving on 22 July. After patrols around the islands, she left on 14 October, arriving at Kingston on 19 November to embark troops, and the next day was stationed for Air-Sea Rescue duty during the Royal Flight to Bermuda from the UK. At Bermuda in December she carried out ceremonial duties during the summit meeting between U.S. President Dwight D. Eisenhower, and the British and French Prime Ministers Winston Churchill and Joseph Laniel, to discuss relations with the Soviet Union following the death of Stalin and their development of a hydrogen bomb.

In January 1954, after exercises with Burghead Bay off Nassau, Veryan Bay sailed to Palm Beach and Jacksonville, Florida to exchange calls with the civil authorities and the U.S. Navy. She returned to Bermuda on 4 February, then sailed to the UK, arriving at Plymouth on the 18th to be paid-off and then refitted at the Devonport Dockyard. In May the ship was recommissioned for service on West Indies under the command of Commander L.R.P. Lawford, and after trials and exercises, she sailed for Bermuda, arriving on 17 August.

In September she sailed once more to the Falklands for guardship duty, calling at Antigua, Trinidad, Georgetown in British Guiana, and Belém and Salvador in Brazil, and Rio de Janeiro, before arriving at Port Stanley on 23 October. Veryan Bay visited South Georgia, and also Tristan da Cunha and the South Shetland Islands, reinforcing Britain's territorial claims, which were disputed by both Argentina and Chile. On 24 February 1955 the Commander-in-Chief of the America and West Indies Station arrived at Port Stanley, flying his flag in the cruiser Superb.

In March Veryan Bay returned to Bermuda, by way of the west coast of South America, calling at Punta Arenas, Puerto Montt, and Antofagasta in Chile, Mollendo in Peru, and La Libertad, Ecuador, before transiting the Panama Canal. From May to July she was deployed at Bermuda for exercises and visits programmes, and in August returned to the UK to refit at Devonport. The ship was recommissioned on 15 October for further service with 7th Frigate Squadron, under the command of Commander J. Bitmead. After trials and exercises in January and February 1956 Veryan Bay sailed from Devonport on 12 March, arriving at Bermuda on the 24th. On 4 April she sailed for the Falklands for guardship duty, routed down the west coast of South America, calling at Callao, Peru, and Antofagasta and Talcahuano, Chile, before transiting the Strait of Magellan, and arriving at Port Stanley on 17 May for local patrols and exercises.

In June she visited to South American Atlantic ports, and in July was deployed on the South Shetland Patrol. In early August she began a programme of visits, first calling at Puerto Belgrano, Argentina, then Mar del Plata, before sailing 190 miles up-river to Rosario. She called at Montevideo, Uruguay, before returning to Port Stanley on 8 September. After local patrols and exercises she sailed once again to Argentina in late September, calling at Río Gallegos and Puerto San Julián, returning to Port Stanley on 11 October to prepare to return to Bermuda. The ship left Stanley on 17 October and was at Santos, Brazil, when she received orders to transfer to the South Atlantic.

=== South Atlantic Squadron ===
Veryan Bay arrived at Simon's Town, South Africa, on 19 November. After a series of visits to East African ports, the ship was nominated for transfer to the Reserve. On 19 January 1957 she sailed for the UK, calling at Lobito in Portuguese West Africa, Boma in the Belgian Congo, and sailed up the Congo River to Matadi. She then called at Libreville in French Equatorial Africa, São Tomé Island in the Gulf of Guinea, Lagos, Nigeria, Monrovia, Liberia, and Freetown, Sierra Leone. Veryan Bay arrived at Plymouth on 11 March, paid-off and was reduced to Reserve status.

=== In reserve and disposal ===
She remained in the Reserve Fleet at Plymouth and was sold and scrapped on 1 July 1959.
