= HMS Daring (D05) =

Daring-class destroyer of the Royal Navy

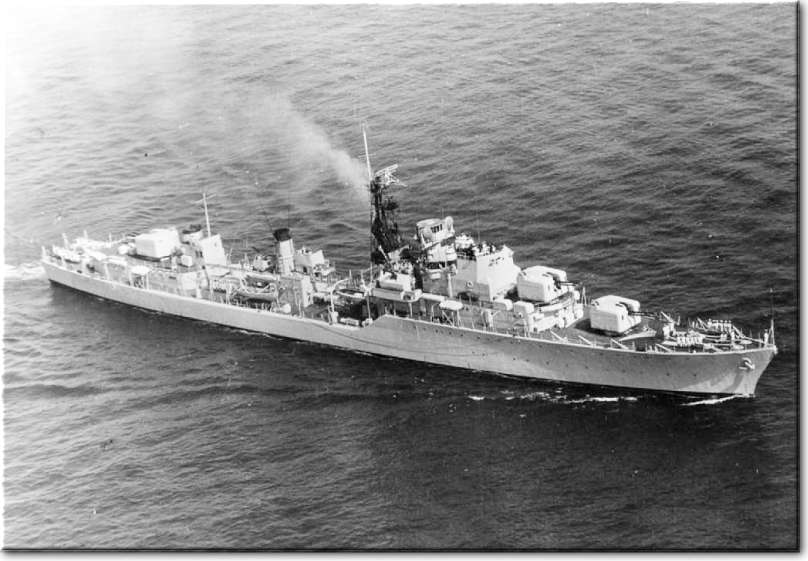
- Daring at sea during her first commission (1952–1954)

History

United Kingdom
- Name: HMS Daring
- Builder: Swan Hunter, Tyne and Wear, United Kingdom
- Laid down: 29 September 1945
- Launched: 10 August 1949
- Commissioned: 8 March 1952
- Decommissioned: 9 October 1968
- Motto: Splendide audax; (Latin: "finely daring")
- Fate: Sold for breaking, arriving at Blyth on 15 June 1971
- Badge: On a Field Black, an arm and a hand in a cresset of fire all Proper

General characteristics
- Class & type: Daring-class destroyer
- Displacement: Standard: 2,830 tons; Full load: 3,820 tons
- Length: 390 ft (120 m)
- Beam: 43 ft (13 m)
- Draught: 13.6 ft (4.1 m)
- Installed power: 54,000 shp (40 MW)
- Propulsion: 2 Foster Wheeler boilers (650 psi, 850 °F), Parsons steam turbines, 2 shafts
- Speed: 30 knots (56 km/h)
- Range: 4,400 nmi (8,100 km) at 20 kn (37 km/h)
- Complement: Approximately 300
- Sensors & processing systems: Radar Type 293Q target indication; Radar Type 291 air warning; Radar Type 274 navigation; Radar Type 275 fire control on director Mk.VI; Radar Type 262 fire control on director CRBF and STAAG Mk.II
- Armament: 6 QF 4.5 in /45 (114 mm) Mark V in 3 twin mountings UD Mark VI; 4 40 mm /60 Bofors A/A in 2 twin mounts STAAG Mk.II; 2 40 mm /60 Bofors A/A in 1 twin mount Mk.V; 2 pentad tubes for 21 inch (533 mm) torpedoes Mk.IX; 1 Squid anti submarine mortar

HMS Daring was the nameship of the Daring-class destroyers authorised in 1944. Between 1953 and 1957 they were reclassified as "Darings" and not included in the destroyer total, but from October 1957 they reverted to classification as destroyers. Daring was built by Swan, Hunter and Wigham Richardson on the Tyne and engined by the Wallsend Slipway & Engineering Company. She was laid down on 29 September 1945; launched on 10 August 1949; and completed on 8 March 1952. She served five commissions, was placed in reserve in December 1968 and sold for scrap in 1971. She was the sixth ship of her name in the Royal Navy.

== Design and construction ==
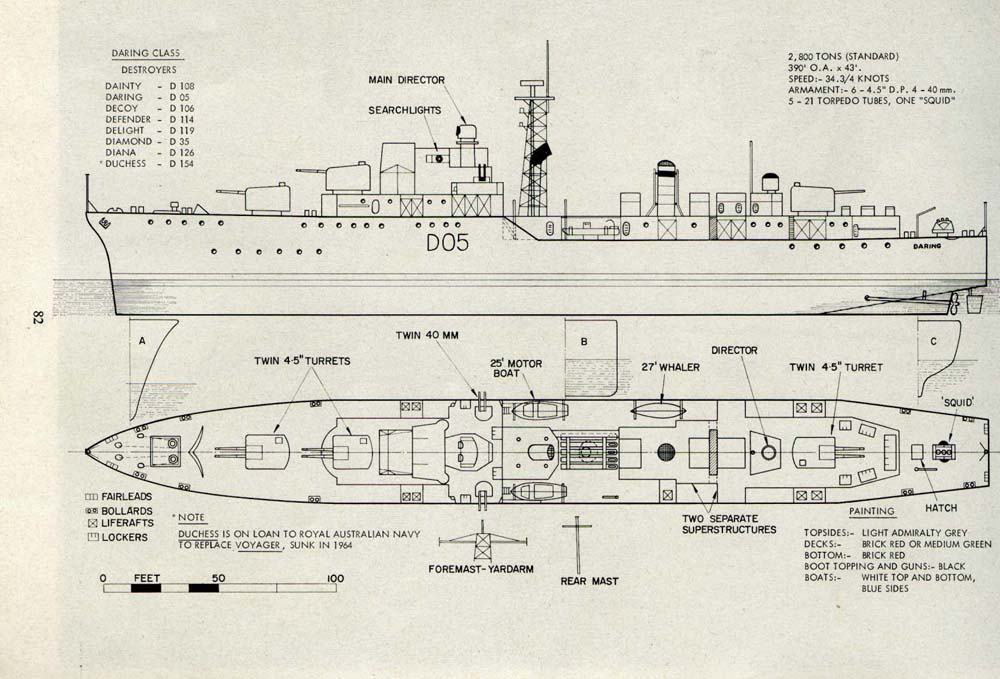
A line drawing of a Daring-class destroyer

Daring was built by Swan, Hunter and Wigham Richardson on the Tyne and engined by the Wallsend Slipway & Engineering Company. She was laid down on 29 September 1945 and launched on 10 August 1949 by Mrs Leonard Hall, daughter-in-law of George Hall, First Lord of the Admiralty. She was commissioned for the first time on 3 February 1952, as the sixth ship of her name in the Royal Navy.

Daring, in common with Dainty, Defender and Delight, had a DC electrical system and these ships comprised the 2nd Destroyer Squadron. The remaining ships of the class received a modern AC electrical system, and formed the 5th Destroyer Squadron. Intended to have been of all-welded construction, Daring and two of her sisters were built using composite welded and riveted construction.

Armament originally consisted of six 4.5 inch guns, six 40 mm AA guns, ten 21 inch (533 mm) torpedo tubes (five of which were removed in 1958 – 1959) and one Squid triple-barrelled depth-charge mortar. Power was provided by Parsons steam turbines giving 54,000 shp (40 MW) and a maximum sea speed of 30.5 knots (56.5 km/h). Electrical supplies were from two steam turbo-generators, each capable of supplying 350 kilowatts (470 hp) at 220 volts DC, and two diesel generators, each capable of 150 kilowatts (200 hp).

== Career ==
=== First commission (May 1952 – August 1954) ===
After commissioning in February 1952, she completed trials, visited her home port of Devonport and conducted final trials at Portland. On 7 May 1952 she sailed for Gibraltar and Malta, arriving on 16 May. She was inspected by the commander-in-chief of the Mediterranean Fleet, Admiral Lord Louis Mountbatten of Burma, a previous captain of the last ship to bear the name Daring. On 19 June an accident with ammunition claimed the lives of Senior Commissioned Gunner G W Rossitter and OA2 W P Murphy. Daring acquired an early reputation as an 'unhappy ship', and this was exacerbated when her commanding officer, Captain Vernon John St. Clair-Ford, died suddenly in August. The appointment of Captain Gick as his successor helped change attitudes, and she quickly became an efficient ship under her new management. Visits to Syracuse, Navarin, Tripoli, Toulon, Golfe-Juan and Naples preceded operations in the Suez Canal Zone in October 1952.

In March 1953 she took part in the NATO exercise Spring Cruise before spending April to July in refit at Gibraltar. On 26 July she sailed to attend the scene of a collision in fog between the British-registered merchant ship Culrain and the Spanish Duero. Duero, on a voyage from Alicante to Las Palmas, and at 1,375 GRT only about a fifth of the size of Culrain, had been sunk by the collision. All 27 crew had been rescued by Culrain, and they were transferred to Daring for landing at Gibraltar.

On 12 August she was recalled to harbour in emergency and ordered to load 200 tons of stores. She sailed for Argostoli to conduct disaster relief operations in the wake of the Kefalonian earthquake. Having landed stores, food and water, and having set up an emergency hospital, she took casualties to Zante on 18 August and passed through the Corinth Canal to Piraeus.

=== Second commission (August 1954 – November 1956) ===
The ship's company remained on board for a further ten months after the end of the first commission, serving with the Home Fleet in the Arctic and then back out to the Mediterranean again. Daring returned to Devonport in mid August 1954, leave was granted and the ship returned to the Home Fleet for exercises. Following the exercises, Daring sailed for Tromsø in Norway.

=== Third commission (November 1956 – October 1958) ===
Daring was en route from the Kiel Canal to Londonderry Port when she was redirected to the Mediterranean. She paused at Gibraltar, and went alongside at Malta. A new crew were flown out from UK in November 1956. To all of the engineering staff she was a completely new design with high pressure four drum boilers and two furnaces operating at 650psi and 850 F superheat. They had a very short period in which to acquaint themselves with the ship and machinery before setting off for the Suez during the Crisis of 1956. On completion of that tour she returned to the Western Mediterranean. She teamed up with three other 'Darings' and carried out exercises with them in the Golfe du Lion. One exercise was a high speed night maneuvering carried out at 30 knots+. Steaming in line abreast under complete blackout the four ships received a signal from Capt. 'D' to turn to starboard 90 degrees into line ahead. Daring was on the end of the line with HMS Diana on her starboard side. When the 'Execute' order was received, Diana failed to respond and Daring turned directly at her. The first lieutenant was on the bridge with the Capt. in the radar plot room. I was i/c 'B' boiler room and saw the repeater telegraph move to "Full Astern". This is an order which has to be obeyed immediately regardless of damage to machinery. The safety valves on my boiler lifted within seconds as the engine room responded shutting off steam to the ahead turbine. The pressure rapidly fell then as the astern maneuvering valves were opened, falling to 150psi before beginning to recover. Water in some quantity must have gone with the steam as several rows of the astern turbine were carried away. Fortunately, being the port engine in 'B' Unit, they managed to get the engine into reverse mode somewhat more quickly than the 'A' Unit which pulled the ship round to port very narrowly avoiding the almost inevitable collision. The ship then made its way to Gibraltar on the one shaft where it spent three months in the dockyard refitting a new astern turbine.

=== Refit (October 1958 – January 1959) ===
In October 1958 she paid off for refit in Devonport, during which her after torpedo tubes were removed and replaced with a deckhouse, providing additional accommodation.

=== Fourth commission (January 1959 – December 1960) ===
Daring recommissioned at Devonport on 20 January 1959 under the command of Captain C. P. Mills. She sailed on 26 January for trials and this revealed faults in the gunnery system which necessitated a long spell in Devonport for repairs. She sailed for shakedown on 5 March before arriving at Portland on 11 March to start work-up under the guidance of the staff of Flag Officer Sea Training.

Leave was given during the second half of April prior to sailing for the Mediterranean, but further faults were discovered in the gunnery system, and a further two weeks had to be spent in the Dockyard rectifying the problem. After another brief work-up at Portland was completed on 29 May, the ship's company were given a week's leave before sailing from Portsmouth on 14 June for the Mediterranean. Stopping briefly at Gibraltar, Daring arrived in Malta and on 20 June was visited by Flag Officer Flotillas, Mediterranean (Rear Admiral Ewing), before joining 45 other ships for the NATO-run Exercise Whitebait off Libya. She conducted a Cyprus Patrol 6–26 July, interrupting the patrol to pay a visit to Athens between 16 and 18 July. Reaching Malta on 29 July, the ship's company immediately began final preparations for the Fleet Regatta at Augusta on 4 August.

After a visit to Monaco between 13 and 18 August and a period of leave in Malta, the ship took part in the annual 'SeptEx' for two weeks. At the end of the exercises she sailed for Venice, visiting the city between 21 and 26 September. A day later the ship arrived in Dubrovnik, but during the early morning of 29 September a fierce gale sprang up, and, fearing that she was dragging her anchor, Daring was forced to weigh and proceed to sea in a fierce storm. Some liberty men were left behind, but were recovered shortly afterwards by Crossbow. After a rough passage to Malta the ship replenished with fuel and stores and joined the ships of the Mediterranean Fleet for exercises with the Spanish Navy, followed by visits to Palma and Mahón in the Balearic Islands.

After the Balearics the ship did more exercises with the fleet before visiting Tunis, where a British trade fair was in progress. Much of October was taken up with preparations for an inspection on 4 and 6 November by Flag Officer Flotillas, Mediterranean. 20 November found Daring with other Royal Navy units in Taranto for a lengthy exercise with the Italian Navy, and this was followed by a brief period exercising with the aircraft carrier Victorious. After detaching from Victorious, an oiling connection at a RAS station fractured and for a time almost the length of the starboard side was flooded by oil. She spent the night at anchor off Fiumincino cleaning the ship of oil before making her rendezvous with HMS Battleaxe for a visit to Civita Vecchia. Shortly afterwards she led the 2nd Destroyer Squadron in a farewell steampast in honour of the Flag Officer Flotillas, Mediterranean, embarked in HMS Tiger.

For ten weeks during Christmas 1959 and New Year 1960 Daring remained in Malta, except for a short visit to Annaba (formerly Bône), Algeria during January. At Malta she docked down and was refitted. In mid-March the maintenance period was over and she left Malta on 14 March 1960. In company with most of the 2nd Destroyer Squadron she made passage for Algiers. After a combined fleet visit to Gibraltar she transferred to the Home Fleet and sailed for Exercise Dawnbreeze V. Poor weather at the start steadily worsened, and on 26 March the force met a full gale on rounding Cape Trafalgar. Once in the Channel the weather improved, but the Exercise had been badly affected. Daring detached and anchored in Jenny Cliff Bay, Plymouth, having been away for nearly 10 months.

After a brief period of leave the ship returned to Portland for weapon training, and then went by way of Portsmouth to Bremen in company with Crossbow and two submarines. After a nine-day visit she sailed down the Elbe estuary and through the Kiel Canal in thick fog, making her way in to the Baltic Sea. The Baltic was traversed in company with other units of the Home Fleet under the watchful eyes of units of the Soviet Navy, arriving in Helsinki on 26 May. Trials in Scotland saw the ship spend 3 weeks in Campbeltown, and from there she went to Loch Eriboll via Orkney. A week at Loch Eriboll was the prelude to another NATO exercise, starting from Rosyth and conducted in poor weather. Visits to Bergen and Horten in Norway were followed by leave at Devonport.

Her final operation of the fourth commission was a patrol off Iceland patrol, a year after the end of the first Cod War. She paid off in December 1960.

=== In reserve (December 1960 – April 1963) ===
Daring was placed in reserve at Devonport between December 1960 and April 1963.

=== Refit (April 1963 – December 1966) ===
In April 1963 Devonport Dockyard took the ship in hand for a long refit, with a planned completion date of October 1964. Delay followed delay and the refit was not finally completed until December 1966. There were several changes to her weapon and sensor fit: The Mark V replaced the Mark II STAAG mounts, the MRS-3 director replaced the Mark VI, and the remaining set of torpedo tubes was removed. Commander J de B Suchlick Royal Navy, the last commanding officer of Daring joked that the ship earned her only battle honour during this period – "Devonport Dockyard (1960–1966)".

=== Fifth commission (November 1966 – October 1968) ===
On 24 October 1966, Daring got under way for the first time in nearly 6 years. Four days of preliminary sea trials, with a trials crew and dockyard workers, were successful. After sea trials many of the seamen were absent for pre-commissioning courses and command team training, while the dockyard worked feverishly to complete the work required by 16 December, the day of commissioning. After Christmas leave the ship's company took her to sea again January and February for Sea Acceptance Trials. Admiral Wise, CSO(T) to CinC Home Fleet, came on board for the acceptance inspection and pronounced the ship operational, despite problems with the gunnery system. Work-up at Portland followed, although this was interrupted to act as a range safety ship for the bombing of the stranded Torrey Canyon.

The ship visited Cherbourg at Whitsun (mid May 1967), and leave was granted in June and July while the ship was prepared for a deployment East of Suez. The ship sailed from Plymouth for the East on 17 July 1967. After visiting Gibraltar on 20 July, and Freetown in Sierra Leone, she conducted the traditional 'Crossing the line' ceremony on 30 July. A stop at Simonstown preceded time on the Beira Patrol and passage to the Far East via Gan. After Christmas in Singapore, she arrived at Hong Kong on 31 December 1967. During her time in Hong Kong the seizure of the USS Pueblo by North Korea raised tensions. She visited Australia, including Darwin, Sydney, where she was inspected by the captain of the 2nd Destroyer Squadron, and Melbourne. In company with Troubridge and Cavalier she made the 3,000 mile journey to Mauritius, encountering 80-foot (24 m) swells. Another 5 weeks were spent on the Beira Patrol before returning to the UK via Simonstown and Gibraltar.

In August 1968 she was stationed at Gibraltar for guardship duties, which included a visit by Admiral of the Fleet Earl Mountbatten of Burma in September. By the end of September she was in Stockholm for British Week. On Wednesday, 9 October 1968, she was commenced preparation for being placed on the disposal list, and in December 1968 she was placed in reserve.

== Disposal ==
Daring was sold for breaking in 1971.

== Publications ==
- Colledge, J. J.; Warlow, Ben (2006) [1969]. Ships of the Royal Navy: The Complete Record of All Fighting Ships of the Royal Navy from the 15th Century to the Present (3rd Rev ed.). London: Chatham Publishing. ISBN 978-1-86176-281-8. OCLC 67375475.
- McCart, Neil (2008). Daring Class Destroyers. Fan Publications. ISBN 978-1-904459-33-0.
