= Teredo =

Teredo may refer to:

- Teredo (bivalve), a genus of shipworms that bores holes in the wood of ships
- Teredo wood, a form of fossilized wood showing marks of shipworm damage
- Coleophora teredo, a moth of family Coleophoridae
- Teredo tunneling, a protocol in computer communications for transmission of IPv6 datagrams
- HMS Teredo (P338), a British submarine

== See also ==
- Teredolites
