= Beira Patrol =

Blockade of oil shipments to Rhodesia

- Active: 1 March 1966 – 25 June 1975
- Country: United Kingdom
- Branch: Royal Navy
- Type: Naval formation
- Role: blockade

The Beira Patrol was a blockade of oil shipments to Rhodesia (now Zimbabwe) through Beira, Mozambique, resulting from United Nations trade sanctions on Rhodesia.

== Background ==
Rhodesia's government unilaterally declared the former colony's independence on 11 November 1965, after rejecting British preconditions for independence that involved racial equality and rule by the black majority. Ian Smith, the country's elected prime minister, continued in that role. The United Nations Security Council reacted by passing Resolution 217, calling for sanctions on Rhodesia. The resolution was later used by the British as legal justification for the blockade.

Britain imposed its own national sanctions, including an oil embargo, but ruled out invading Rhodesia. The British were initially opposed to military action, instead relying on UN sanctions to pressure the Rhodesians. A majority of UN member states wanted expanded sanctions and military measures. The British initially attempted to block such initiatives.

In October 1965, the Joint Intelligence Committee estimated that even a full trade embargo would fail to cripple Rhodesia's economy due to sanctions evasion enabled by Portuguese Mozambique and South Africa, but suggested that prolonged and severe economic pressure could induce the white electorate to overthrow the government. In early 1966, Prime Minister Harold Wilson made statements that sanctions were working, predicting that the Rhodesian government would soon fall. At the same time, the Foreign Office was feverishly negotiating with the Portuguese Government to participate in the sanctions, which would effectively impose a total blockade on Rhodesia. By the end of 1966, when it became clear that Portugal was unwilling to cooperate against Rhodesia, the Royal Navy began looking into the possibility of a maritime blockade against Mozambique-bound ships carrying oil destined for Rhodesia.

During the first week of February 1966, it became clear that Rhodesia continued to import oil by land from Portuguese Mozambique, and Prime Minister Wilson was warned that black African states could push for more urgent sanctions and raise the matter at the UN. On 24 February, the Chiefs of Staff Committee warned that tankers with oil for Rhodesia could arrive in the port of Beira, the terminus of a pipeline going to Rhodesia, unnoticed, and began preparing a maritime surveillance plan for submission to the Prime Minister. Later in February, the British government and world press began focusing on tankers carrying oil for Rhodesia when on 25 February, the Rhodesian Commerce and Industry Minister announced that a tanker with oil for Rhodesia would soon arrive.

== Blockade ==
Following the reports of Rhodesia defying the oil embargo by sea, the British felt pressure to take action and thus prove their commitment to sanctions. On 1 March, the Royal Navy established the Beira Patrol. As many nations had committed themselves to the policy of sanctions, it was required that the nationalities of any tankers carrying oil to Beira should be known. This was the task of aircraft carrier HMS Ark Royal and the escort forces HMS Rhyl, HMS Lowestoft and later HMS Plymouth. Stationed off Beira, directing it to prepare for intercept operations starting on 4 March. Consequently, Ark Royal left Mombasa on 1 March 1966 and was ordered to proceed to the Mozambique Channel to commence a surveillance patrol off Beira. On 6 March, early warning aircraft from Ark Royal began search operations in the Mozambique Channel. The frigate HMS Rhyl and a logistical support ship were soon added. On 28 Feb 1966 HMS Eagle had sailed from Singapore on passage to Beira and remained on station until 10 May 1966 (being relieved by Ark Royal), returning to Singapore on 10 May 1966. In 71 days Eagle flew 1,070 sorties, flying 600,000 miles, surveying 200,000 square miles daily, steaming a total of 30,000 miles.

The patrol lasted until 1975. At any time, two British frigates or destroyers, with the support of land and carrier-based surveillance aircraft and auxiliary vessels, were committed to the patrol. Various British warships cruised the Mozambique Channel 20–45 miles (32–72 km) from Beira and checking on oil tankers heading for the port. As an example of such deployments, HMS Sirius interrupted her passage out to Singapore to carry out a deployment on the Beira Patrol early in 1967.

Initially, Royal Navy ships were to shadow and question Beira-bound tankers, and were only allowed to forcibly divert a tanker away after Britain obtained permission from its flag state. However, in the event that permission was granted, British warships were only allowed to demand it change course in the name of its flag state, and fire a shot across the bow if it did not work. The use of force was not authorised, and if the tanker absolutely refused to comply, the shadowing warship could take no more action and only follow it to within Mozambique's six-mile territorial limit. This meant that the tanker would be allowed to proceed unhindered to port.

After an incident where the Greek tanker Joanna V was intercepted by HMS Plymouth, but as Plymouth was not authorised to use force, the tanker freely sailed into Beira, the British lobbied for UN authority to use force. The UN Security Council subsequently passed Resolution 221. However, the resolution confined the blockade to Beira and authorised only the Royal Navy to use force. As a result, the Royal Navy alone had to enforce the blockade without assistance, and tankers with oil for Rhodesia could freely dock at other Mozambican ports. The resolution also empowered the British to seize the Joanna V upon its departure from Beira if it had discharged its oil cargo there. On 8 April 1967, the frigate Berwick intercepted the tanker Manuella and escorted her away from the Mozambique Channel, but when Berwick broke off for refuelling, Manuella again set course for Beira, but was intercepted by the frigate Puma, which kept the tanker from reaching Beira.

The rules of engagement were subsequently liberalised, but use of force was limited "to the very minimum", and Defence Ministry approval was required for the diversion of vessels. British warships also had to remain outside of Portugal's territorial waters. After an embarrassing incident involving the French tanker Artois, which ignored a challenge from the frigate Minerva with Minerva firing warning shots before the MoD signalled that Artois was authorised to enter Beira, the rules of engagement were further modified, allowing the use of disabling fire.

Britain never managed to obtain UN authority allowing other navies to participate. As well as lacking UN permission, the British judged it outside their capabilities to blockade other Mozambican ports, at the cost of risking relations with Portugal, a fellow member of NATO. South Africa was also capable of transporting oil to Beira by having tankers cruise through South African and then Portuguese territorial waters, providing legal immunity from interception. As a result, Rhodesia continued to receive oil shipments. Rhodesia was also able to withstand the blockade by strictly rationing oil. In September 1966, it was estimated that Rhodesia received 220,000 gallons of oil daily, when it needed only 200,000 a day under its rationing policy.

The patrol was gradually reduced in several stages. In March 1971, new Prime Minister Edward Heath allowed the Royal Navy to commit one warship at a time, rather than two. Three months later, the patrol lost its air component when the Malagasy Republic asked the Royal Air Force to eliminate its detachment at Majunga. After an overall drop in the number of frigates in the fleet, the Royal Navy was allowed to make the patrol intermittent. The patrol was finally eliminated on 25 June 1975, when Mozambique gained independence from Portugal and assured Britain that it would not allow transship oil to Rhodesia.

The operation had cost more than 100 million pounds, and 76 Royal Navy ships took part in the operation. A total of 47 oil tankers were intercepted, of which 42 were allowed to proceed.

== Ships involved ==
Ships involved in the patrol included:

=== Aircraft carriers ===
- Ark Royal
- Eagle

=== Destroyers ===
- Cambrian
- Caprice
- Cavalier
- Daring
- Diana
- London
- Fife
- Glamorgan

=== Frigates ===
HMS Llandaff 1967 Two patrols

- Ajax
- Mohawk
- Plymouth
- Berwick
- Falmouth
- Puma
- Minerva
- Londonderry
- Yarmouth
- Rhyl
- Lowestoft
- Cleopatra
- Phoebe
- Danae
- Salisbury
- Sirius
- Brighton
- Ashanti
- Nubian
- Zulu
- Chichester
- Euryalus

=== Auxiliaries ===
- Tidepool

== See also ==
- History of Zimbabwe
- United Nations Security Council Resolution 221
- United Nations Security Council Resolution 232
