= United Nations Security Council Resolution 217 =

UN Security Council Resolution 217
- Date: November 20 1965
- Meeting no.: 1265
- Subject: Question concerning the situation in Southern Rhodesia
- Voting summary: 10 voted for; None voted against; 1 abstained
- Result: Adopted

Security Council composition
- Permanent members: China; France; Soviet Union; United Kingdom; United States
- Non-permanent members: Bolivia; Ivory Coast; Jordan; Malaysia; Netherlands; Uruguay

United Nations Security Council Resolution 217, adopted unanimously on November 20, 1965, determined that the situation resulting from the Unilateral Declaration of Independence was extremely grave and that the Government of the United Kingdom should put an end to it as it constitutes a threat to international peace and security. The Council also called upon nations not to recognize what it deemed "this illegal authority" or entertain diplomatic relations with it. It also asked all states to refrain from economic relations with Rhodesia.

The resolution was adopted by ten votes to none; France abstained.

The interception of Joanna V was an action of the British Navy Beira Patrol carried out in accordance to this resolution on 4 April. However this action proved ineffective and United Nations Security Council Resolution 221 was then adopted on 9 April to grant more powers to the Beira Patrol.

The resolution was adopted under Chapter VI of the United Nations Charter, making it a non-binding recommendation. Its ineffectiveness has been credited to this non-binding nature.

== See also ==
- List of United Nations Security Council Resolutions 201 to 300 (1965–1971)
