= Gordon Tait (Royal Navy officer) =

Royal Navy Admiral (1921–2005)

Admiral Sir Gordon Tait KCB DSC
- Born: 30 October 1921; Timaru, New Zealand
- Died: 29 May 2005 (aged 83); Auckland, New Zealand
- Military career
- Allegiance: United Kingdom
- Branch: Royal Navy
- Service years: 1939–1979
- Rank: Admiral
- Commands: Flag Officer, Plymouth (1975–77); Royal Naval College Dartmouth (1970–72); 3rd Submarine Squadron (1967–69); HMS Maidstone (1967–68); 2nd Destroyer Squadron (1965–66); HMS Ajax (1965–66); HMS Caprice (1960–62); HMS Sanguine (1955–56); HMS Tally-Ho (1955); HMS Aurochs (1951–53); HMS Ambush (1951); HMS Solent (1948); HMS Teredo (1947)
- Conflicts: Second World War
- Awards: Knight Commander of the Order of the Bath; Distinguished Service Cross; Mentioned in Despatches

Admiral Sir Allan Gordon Tait, KCB, DSC (30 October 1921 – 29 May 2005) was a senior Royal Navy officer who served as Second Sea Lord and Chief of Naval Personnel from 1977 to 1979.

== Naval career ==
Tait joined the Royal Navy as a cadet in 1939. He served in the Second World War with the Arctic convoys from 1939. In 1941, while serving as a junior officer on HMS Nigeria, he seized the Enigma cipher settings from the German weather ship Lauenburg. He served in submarines in the Mediterranean and Far East from 1942 until the end of the war, being awarded the Distinguished Service Cross for his skill and courage as a gunnery officer.

Tait was made commanding officer of the submarine HMS Teredo in 1947 and the submarine HMS Solent in 1948, before becoming Aide-de-camp to Lieutenant General Sir Bernard Freyberg, Governor General of New Zealand, in 1949. He then commanded successively the submarines HMS Ambush, HMS Aurochs, HMS Tally-Ho and HMS Sanguine. He went on to be Assistant Naval Adviser at the UK High Commission in Canada in 1957, and commanded the destroyer HMS Caprice from 1960.

In 1965, Tait was given command of the frigate HMS Ajax and the 2nd Destroyer Squadron in the Far East, and in 1967 he took over the submarine depot ship HMS Maidstone and the 3rd Submarine Squadron. He was appointed Chief of Staff at Submarine Command in 1969 and made commander of the Royal Naval College Dartmouth in 1970. In 1972 he became Naval Secretary at the Ministry of Defence and in 1975 he was made Flag Officer, Plymouth and Admiral Superintendent at Devonport. He last appointment was as Second Sea Lord and Chief of Naval Personnel in 1977. He was promoted to full admiral on 14 March 1978, and retired in 1979.

== Personal life ==
Tait married Philippa Todd, daughter of Bryan Todd, in 1952. He died on 29 May 2005. Philippa, Lady Tait, died in 2026.

Military offices
Preceded by Iwan Raikes	Naval Secretary; 1972–1974	Succeeded by John Forbes
Preceded by Sir Arthur Power	Flag Officer, Plymouth; 1975–1977	Succeeded by Sir John Forbes
Preceded by Sir David Williams	Second Sea Lord; 1977–1979	Succeeded by Sir Desmond Cassidi
