= HMS Aurochs =

Amphion-class submarine of the Royal Navy

- HMS Aurochs

History

United Kingdom
- Name: HMS Aurochs
- Namesake: Aurochs
- Ordered: Very late in World War II
- Builder: Vickers-Armstrongs, Barrow-in-Furness
- Laid down: 21 June 1944
- Launched: 28 July 1945
- Commissioned: 7 February 1947
- Decommissioned: 1966
- Identification: Pennant number P246
- Fate: Sold for scrap on 7 February 1967. Scrapped at Troon, Scotland in February 1967.

General characteristics
- Class & type: Amphion-class submarine
- Displacement: 1,360 long tons (1,382 t) surfaced; 1,590 long tons (1,616 t) submerged
- Length: 293 ft 6 in (89.46 m)
- Beam: 22 ft 4 in (6.81 m)
- Draught: 18 ft 1 in (5.51 m)
- Propulsion: 2 × 2,150 hp (1,600 kW) Admiralty ML 8-cylinder diesel engines; 2 × 625 hp (466 kW) electric motors; 2 shafts
- Speed: 18.5 knots (34.3 km/h; 21.3 mph) surfaced; 8 knots (15 km/h; 9.2 mph) submerged
- Range: 10,500 nautical miles (19,400 km) at 11 knots (20 km/h) surfaced; 16 nautical miles (30 km) at 8 knots (15 km/h) or 90 nautical miles (170 km) at 3 knots (5.6 km/h) submerged
- Test depth: 350 ft (110 m)
- Complement: 60
- Armament: 6 × 21 inch (533 mm) (2 external) bow torpedo tubes; 4 × 21 in (2 external) stern torpedo tubes; 20 torpedoes; 26 × Mines; 1 × 4 in (102 mm) main deck gun; 3 × 0.303 in (7.70 mm) machine guns; 1 × 20 mm AA Oerlikon 20 mm gun

HMS Aurochs (P426/S26), was an Amphion-class submarine of the Royal Navy, built by Vickers-Armstrongs and launched 28 July 1945. Her namesake was the aurochs (Bos primigenius), an extinct Eurasian wild ox ancestral to domestic cattle and often portrayed in cave art and heraldry.

== Operational history ==
In 1953 she took part in the fleet review to celebrate the Coronation of Elizabeth II. During 1953 she was commanded by Lieutenant-Commander A. G. Tait.

On 17 May 1958, Aurochs was patrolling the Molucca Sea off Indonesia when an unidentified aircraft machine-gunned her. The aircraft remained at a high altitude and Aurochs sustained no casualties or damage. President Sukarno's Indonesian government told the UK's Conservative Government its armed forces had not executed the attack. The UK Foreign and Commonwealth Office stated that it accepted the assurance and assumed that North Celebes rebels had carried out the attack.

It is true Permesta rebels in North Sulawesi were supported by a "Revolutionary Air Force", AUREV (Angkatan Udara Revolusioner). However, all AUREV aircraft, munitions and pilots were supplied by the Nationalist Chinese air force, or the CIA. Two CIA pilots, William H. Beale and Allen Pope, were using Douglas B-26 Invader aircraft to attack Indonesian and foreign targets in the area since April 1958. By 17 May Beale had quit the operation, but Pope continued to fly sorties until the day after Aurochs was attacked, 18 May, when he tried to attack an Indonesian Navy convoy. However, he was shot down and captured.

Apart from Affray which had been lost in an accident in 1951, Aurochs was the only one other ship of her class which was not modernised. In March 1961, the submarine that took part in a combined naval exercise with the United States Navy off Nova Scotia.

Aurochs was decommissioned in 1966 and arrived at Troon in February 1967 for breaking up.

== Sources ==
- Conboy, Kenneth; Morrison, James (1999). Feet to the Fire CIA Covert Operations in Indonesia, 1957–1958. Annapolis: Naval Institute Press. ISBN 1-55750-193-9.
