= HMS Crossbow =

Weapon-class destroyer

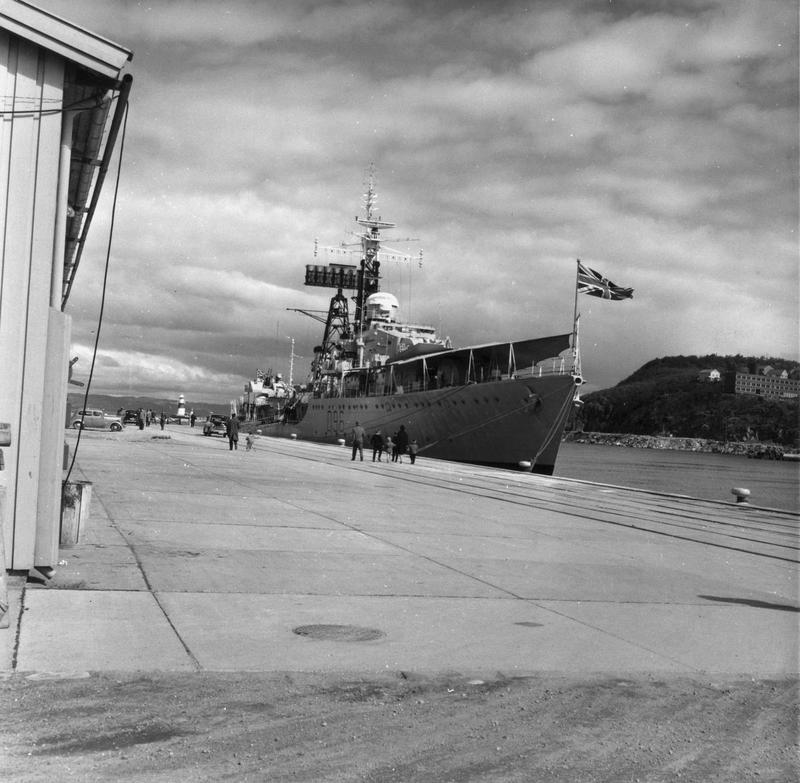
- HMS Crossbow (D96) moored at Trondheim. May 1961 (IWM).

History

United Kingdom
- Name: HMS Crossbow
- Builder: John I. Thornycroft & Company
- Laid down: 26 August 1944
- Launched: 20 December 1945
- Completed: 4 March 1948
- Identification: Pennant number D96
- Fate: Sold 14 December 1971, broken up at Briton Ferry

General characteristics
- Class & type: Weapon-class destroyer
- Displacement: 1,980 tons standard
- Length: 365 ft (111 m)
- Beam: 38 ft (12 m)
- Armament: 4 x 4-inch (102 mm) DP guns on twin Mk XIX mounts; 6 x Bofors 40 mm L/60 gun AA guns; 10 x 21 inch (533 mm) torpedo tubes (removed after 1957)

HMS Crossbow was a Weapon-class destroyer of the Royal Navy that was in service from 1948 and scrapped in 1972.

== Service ==
On commissioning in 1948 Crossbow formed part of the 6th Destroyer Flotilla (later Squadron), as part of the Home Fleet, along with the other Weapon-class destroyers. In 1953 she took part in the Fleet Review to celebrate the Coronation of Queen Elizabeth II. In 1955 she was replaced in the 6th Destroyer Squadron by Contest.

In 1957 all of the Weapon class were taken into refit and conversion to re-equip them as radar pickets, to supplement the new Salisbury-class frigates. Crossbow was converted at Chatham Dockyard. The conversion involved the removal of both sets of torpedo tubes and the erection of an additional lattice mast, which carried a large Type 965 Radar (AKE -1 aerial). Crossbow re-commissioned in 1959 and was then allocated to the 2nd Destroyer Squadron. She was present at Chatham Navy Days in April 1960.

== Decommissioning and disposal ==
In 1963 Crossbow was reduced to operational reserve and three years later relieved the destroyer Solebay as the harbor training ship for the shore establishment Sultan. She was replaced in that role by the destroyer Diamond early in 1970. She was placed on the disposal list and sold to Thos. W. Ward for scrapping and arrived at their yard at Briton Ferry on 21 January 1972.

== Publications ==
- Colledge, J. J.; Warlow, Ben (2006) [1969]. Ships of the Royal Navy: The Complete Record of All Fighting Ships of the Royal Navy from the 15th Century to the Present (3rd Rev ed.). London: Chatham Publishing. ISBN 978-1-86176-281-8. OCLC 67375475.
- Marriott, Leo (1989). Royal Navy Destroyers Since 1945. Ian Allan Ltd. ISBN 0-7110-1817-0.
