= HMS Minerva (F45) =

1966 Type 12I or Leander-class frigate of the Royal Navy

History

United Kingdom
- Name: HMS Minerva
- Builder: Vickers Armstrong
- Laid down: 25 July 1963
- Launched: 19 December 1964
- Commissioned: 14 May 1966
- Decommissioned: March 1992
- Identification: Pennant number F45
- Nickname(s): "Fighting 45"
- Fate: Sold for scrap July 1993

General characteristics
- Class & type: Leander-class frigate
- Displacement: 3,200 long tons (3,251 t) full load
- Length: 113.4 m (372 ft)
- Beam: 12.5 m (41 ft)
- Draught: 5.8 m (19 ft)
- Propulsion: 2 × Babcock & Wilcox boilers supplying steam to two sets of White-English Electric double-reduction geared turbines to two shafts
- Speed: 28 knots (52 km/h)
- Range: 4,600 nautical miles (8,500 km) at 15 knots (28 km/h)
- Complement: 223
- Armament: As built: 1 × twin 4.5-inch (114 mm) guns; 1 × quadruple Sea Cat anti-aircraft missile launchers; 1 × Limbo anti-submarine mortar; From 1980: 4 × Exocet anti-ship missile launchers; 3 × quadruple Seacat anti-aircraft missile launchers; 2 × single 40 mm Bofors anti-aircraft guns; 2 × triple torpedo tubes
- Aircraft carried: 1 × Westland Wasp helicopter; From 1980: 1 × Lynx helicopter

HMS Minerva (F45) was a Leander-class frigate of the Royal Navy. The ship commissioned in 1966. New Year's Day 1970 Minerva left Chatham for Gibraltar and the Mediterranean to shadow the new Russian helicopter carrier Moskva along with American warships and plane. In 1970 she took part in the Beira Patrol and spent some time in the South Pacific, visiting the Solomon Islands and New Hebrides, Auckland, Dunedin, Sydney and Freemantle. In 1976 she was involved with the third Cod War and the Falklands War in 1982. Charles, Prince of Wales served aboard the ship in the 1970s. Between these major engagements, the frigate patrolled British territorial waters and took part in NATO and British military exercises. Minerva was decommissioned in 1992 and sold for scrap.

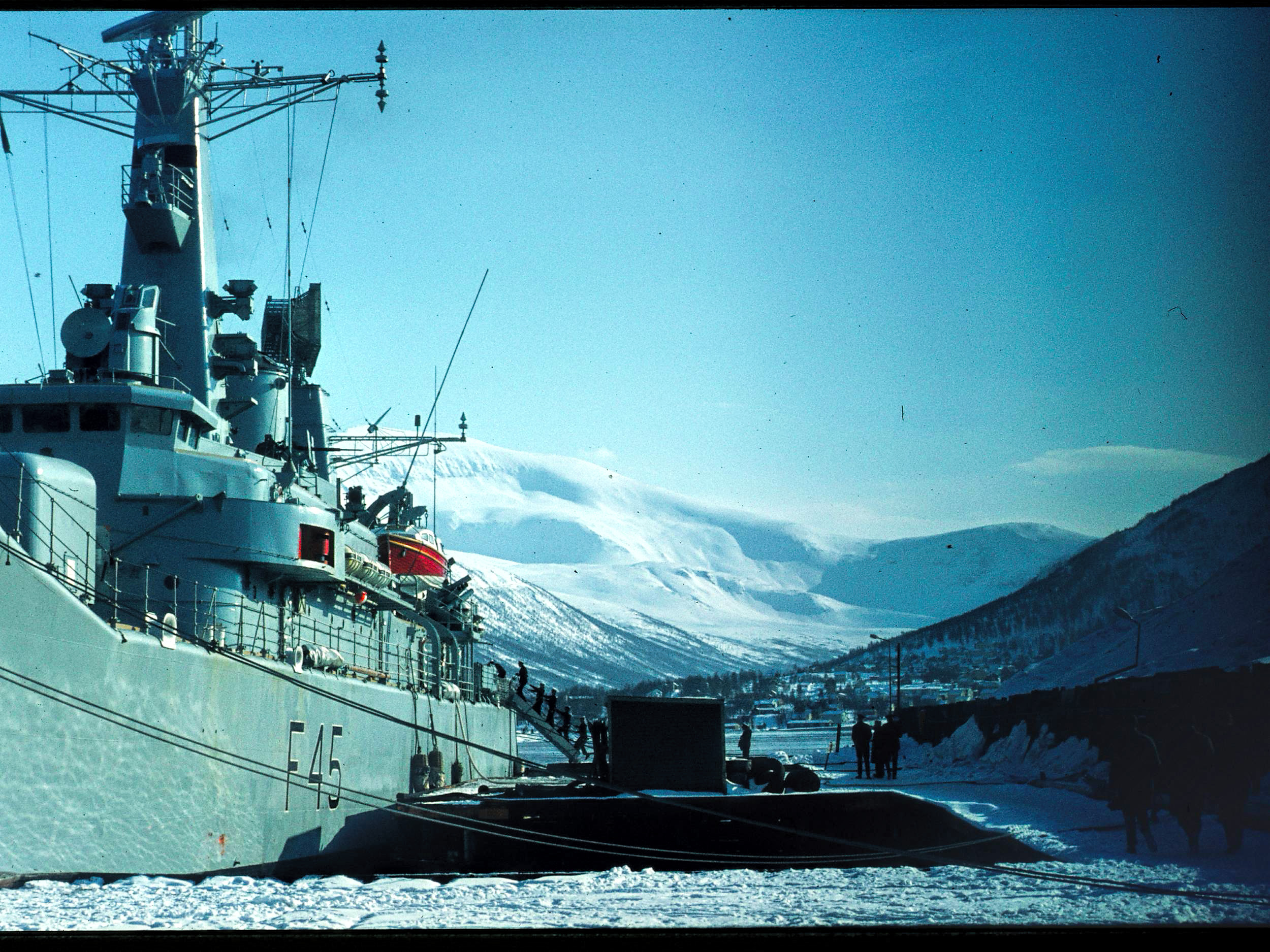
HMS Minerva in Tromso Norway, April 1970

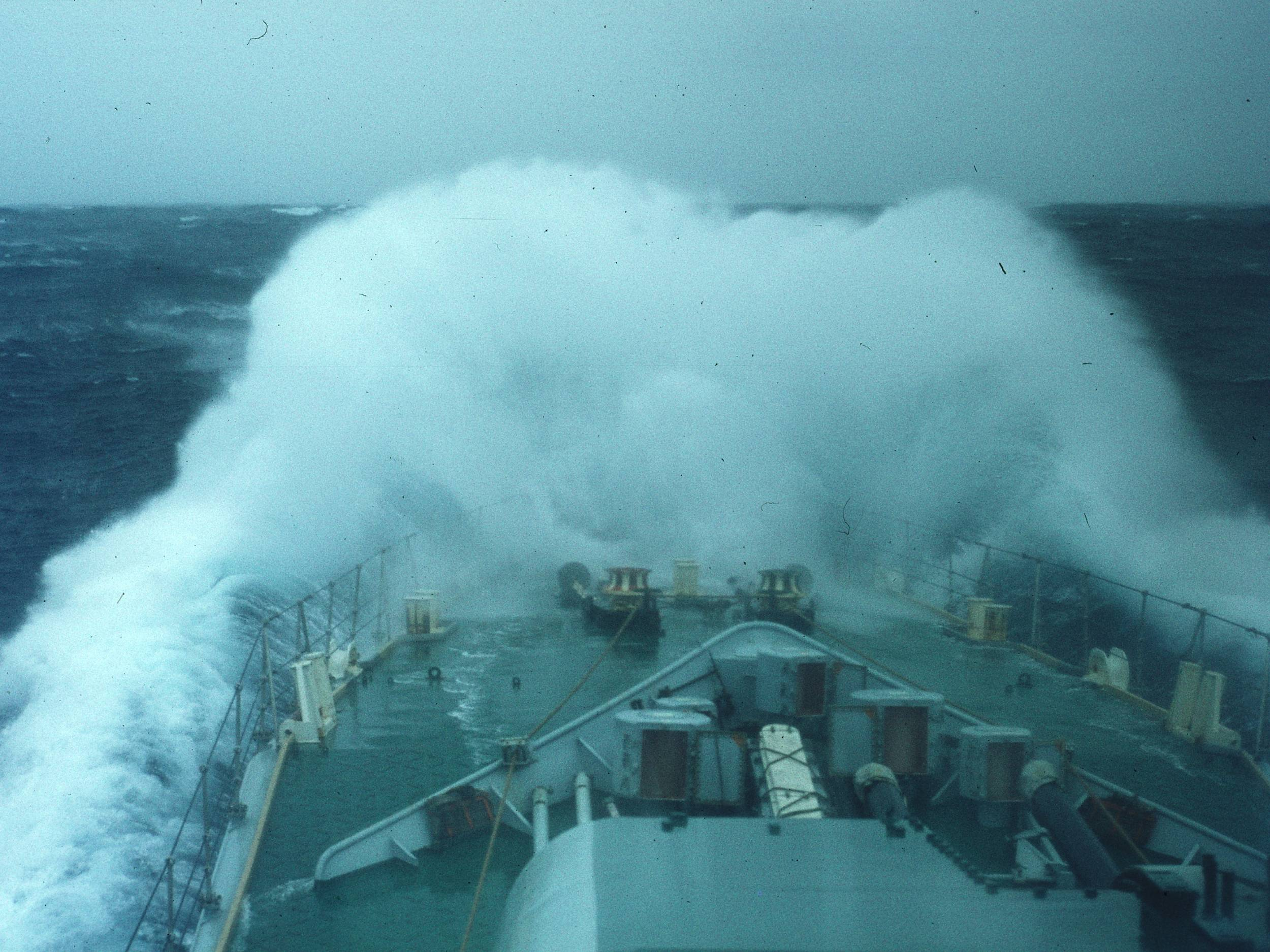
Minerva in a very rough Irish Sea, April 1970

== Construction and design ==
Minerva was ordered during 1962 as the 13th ship of the Leander-class. The ship was laid down at Devonport Dockyard on 25 July 1963, was launched on 19 December 1964 and commissioned with the Pennant number F45 on 14 May 1966.

Minerva was 372 feet (113.4 m) long overall and 360 feet (109.7 m) at the waterline, with a beam of 41 feet (12.5 m) and a maximum draught of 18 feet (5.5 m). Displacement was 2,380 long tons (2,420 t) standard and 2,860 long tons (2,910 t) full load. The ship was fitted with Y-136 machinery, built by Vickers at their Barrow-in-Furness works. Two oil-fired Babcock & Wilcox boilers fed steam at 550 pounds per square inch (3,800 kPa) and 850 °F (454 °C) to a pair of double reduction geared steam turbines that in turn drove two propeller shafts, with the machinery rated at 30,000 shaft horsepower (22,000 kW), giving a speed of 28 knots (52 km/h; 32 mph). (Note: This speed was for the ship at deep load condition, and with six months worth of fouling in temperate conditions.)

A twin 4.5-inch (113 mm) Mark 6 gun mount was fitted forward. Anti-aircraft defence was provided by a quadruple Sea Cat surface-to-air missile launcher on the hangar roof, while two Oerlikon 20 mm cannon for close-in defence against surface targets. A Limbo anti-submarine mortar was fitted aft to provide a short-range anti-submarine capability, while a hangar and helicopter deck allowed a single Westland Wasp helicopter to be operated, for longer range anti-submarine and anti-surface operations.

As built, Minerva was fitted with a large Type 965 long range air search radar on the ship's mainmast, with a Type 993 short range air/surface target indicating radar and Type 974 navigation radar carried on the ship's foremast. An MRS3 fire control system was carried over the ship's bridge to direct the 4.5-inch guns, while a GWS22 director for Seacat was mounted on the hangar roof. The ship had a sonar suite of Type 184 medium range search sonar, Type 162 bottom search and Type 170 attack sonar. While there was provision for a Type 199 variable depth sonar (VDS), this was not fitted.

From 1975 to 1979, Minerva was refitted at Chatham Dockyard where she was converted to the Batch 2 (or Exocet) conversion. The conversion included the removal and replacement of all the ship's armament. The Mark 6 4.5-in gun mount was replaced by four Exocet anti-ship missiles. The Limbo anti-submarine mortar was removed to give a larger flight deck and the ship's hangar was enlarged to allow a Westland Lynx helicopter to be operated, while two triple STWS torpedo tubes provided short range anti-submarine capability. Anti-aircraft armament consisted of one Seacat launcher mounted forward of the Exocet containers and two more mounted aft on the hangar roof, backed up by two Bofors 40 mm anti-aircraft guns on the bridge wings. Type 1006 navigation radar replaced the old Type 974 radar, while the MRS3 gun control director as replaced by a GWS22 director for the forward Seacat launcher, with a second Seacat director mounted aft. Type 184M sonar replaced the main hull sonar, while the VDS was removed and its well plated over. Displacement rose to 2,700 long tons (2,700 t) standard and 3,200 long tons (3,300 t), with speed falling by two knots.

== Service ==
In 1968, Minerva deployed to the West Indies during some troubles there, operating from Bermuda. Island hopping was carried out to "show the flag". In 1970, Minerva, like many other British vessels including other Leanders, deployed on Beira Patrol, an operation designed to prevent oil from reaching the landlocked Rhodesia via Mozambique, before visiting various ports around Asia and the Pacific. The following year, Minerva deployed on her second Beira Patrol which proved relatively quiet.

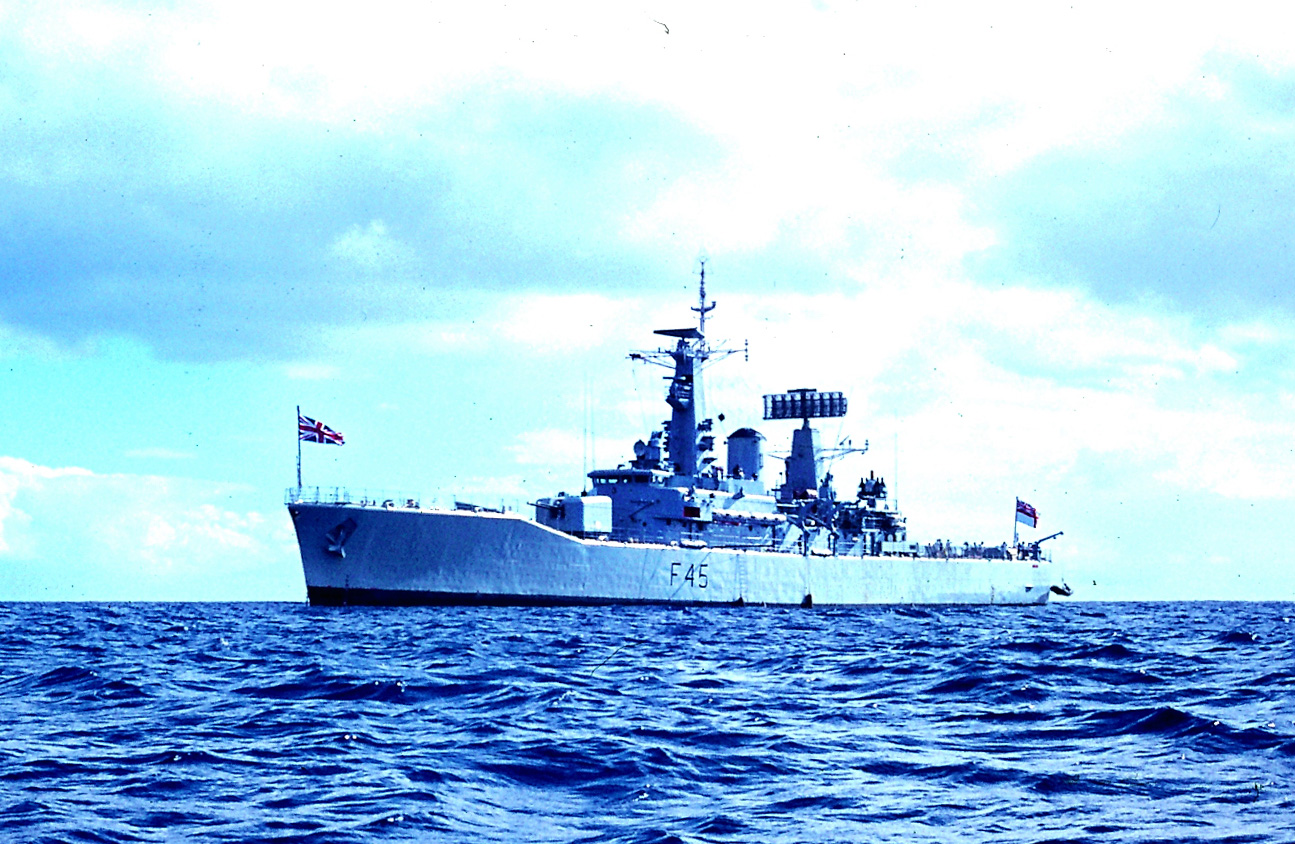
HMS Minerva anchored of Jamestown St Helena June 1970

In November 1972, the Prince of Wales joined Minerva. The following year, in February, Minerva, along with the Prince, deployed to the Caribbean. While there Minerva was involved in a number of exercises, including Exercise "Rum Punch" at Puerto Rico, involving British and American forces. The ship returned to the UK in November. Minerva then took part in the Second Cod War, in early 1973. In 1975, Minerva returned to the Caribbean, performing a variety of duties there.

Between December 1975 and March 1979, Minerva underwent modernisation, including the addition of Exocet missiles. While she was undergoing post refit trials Minerva suffered a starboard boiler explosion which destroyed both boiler uptakes forcing her to be towed to Chatham Dockyard for repairs. Following completion of the repairs and refit, Minerva became leader of the Fifth Frigate Squadron. On 15 December 1979, a 200 feet (61 m) dockyard crane at Devonport Dockyard collapsed in a storm, hitting Minerva and the frigate Ambuscade, which was berthed alongside. Minerva's starboard Seacat launcher was wrecked, and her hangar damaged, while Ambuscade had one of her boats damaged. In 1980, Minerva deployed to the Mediterranean where she carried out exercises with other NATO warships. While there Minerva got involved in the Cold War when she shadowed Kiev, the nameship of a three-ship class of large aircraft carriers. Between 1978 and 1980 she was commanded by Benjamin Bathurst.

In 1981, Minerva was involved in further exercises in the Persian Gulf.

In 1982 during the Falklands War Minerva was part of the 'Bristol Group' and thus joined the war rather late, not reaching the Falkland Islands until 26 May. While there, Minerva performed a number of duties, including escort for other vessels. On 1 June 1982 her radar detected an Argentinian C-130 and vectored a flight of patrolling Sea Harriers towards it. The reconnaissance plane was intercepted and shot down. Minerva suffered no damage during her deployment during the Falklands War and she returned to Devonport in September, crowds greeting her upon her return.

In November, Minerva accidentally rammed the Rothesay-class frigate HMS Yarmouth. In late 1984, Minerva returned to the South Atlantic on a deployment that encompassed all British South Atlantic territories, a deployment which lasted into 1985. In 1986, Minerva completed a brief three-month deployment to the Caribbean. This was followed by BOST at Portland and JMC 863. On 12 January 1987 Minerva once again deployed to the South Atlantic as Falklands Guardship including a visit to South Georgia. She was relieved by HMS Penelope in May and returned home via the Patagonian Canal visiting Valparaíso, Chile, Lima, Peru, Panama and Florida. She returned home briefly for annual leave on 3 July before returning to sea early August on FCS duties and a further BOST. Minerva completed 330 sea days in this year. 1988 was a quieter affair with a short visit to the Mediterranean followed by refit in September 1988. In 1990 as part of the Dartmouth Training Group led by HMS Bristol, she completed deployments to the Great Lakes and a global deployment in 1990. On her return and showing her age, Minerva was laid up in March 1992, her long and eventful career finally coming to an end. The following year Minerva was sold for scrap.
