= Charles Mills (Royal Navy officer) =

Royal Navy officer (1914–2006)

Vice-Admiral Sir Charles Mills KCB CBE DSC
- Born: 4 October 1914
- Died: 27 July 2006 (aged 91)
- Military career
- Allegiance: United Kingdom
- Branch: Royal Navy
- Service years: 1932–1969
- Rank: Vice admiral
- Commands: Plymouth Command; HMS Daring; HMS Concord; HMS Brazen
- Conflicts: Second World War; Korean War; Suez Crisis
- Awards: Knight Commander of the Order of the Bath; Commander of the Order of the British Empire; Distinguished Service Cross

Sir Charles Piercy Mills (4 October 1914 – 27 July 2006) was a Royal Navy officer who went on to be Governor of Guernsey.

== Naval career ==
Educated at the Royal Naval College, Dartmouth, Mills joined the Royal Navy in 1932.

Mills served in the Second World War and briefly commanded HMS Brazen in 1939. He worked at Western Approaches Command in Liverpool at the height of the Battle of the Atlantic. He went on to be a signals officer at Algiers before joining the planning staff for the Normandy landings. He then became a signals officer based in Ceylon.

Mills also fought in the Korean War as captain of the destroyer HMS Concord, earning the Distinguished Service Cross for his services. He was then made Second-in-Command of the signals school at Portsmouth, and then from 1956, he became Chief Staff Officer to the Flag Officer Second-in-Command, Mediterranean Fleet. He was appointed a Commander of the Order of the British Empire for services during the Suez Crisis. In 1959 he took command of the destroyer HMS Daring and the 2nd Destroyer Squadron and in 1963 he was made Director-General (Weapons).

Mills was appointed Flag Officer Second-in-Command Far East Fleet in 1966 and the final Commander-in-Chief, Plymouth, in 1967. He retired in 1969 and became Lieutenant Governor of Guernsey.

== Family ==
In 1944 he married Anne Cumberlege; they went on to have two daughters.

Military offices
| Preceded by Sir Fitzroy Talbot | Commander-in-Chief, Plymouth; 1967–1969 | Succeeded by Sir John Roxburgh (As Flag Officer, Plymouth) |
Government offices
| Preceded by Sir Charles Coleman | Lieutenant Governor of Guernsey; 1969–1974 | Succeeded by Sir John Martin |
