= Venizelos SA =

Shipping company in Athens

Venezelos SA was a shipping company established in Athens in the 1960s. The company was managed by Nikitas Venizelos who became a prominent Greek politician. By 1965, the company had a mixed fleet of 11 cargo ships and oil tankers.

In 1966, they were owners of MV Joanna V, an oil tanker which attempted to break the blockade established to enforce UN sanctions against Rhodesia. On 7 February, they chartered the ship, then called MV Arietta Venizelos, to Yiorgos Vardinogiannis.
