= MV Joanna V =

Greek oil tanker

MV Joanna V (previously Arietta Venezelos) was a Greek oil tanker which in 1966 the Royal Navy threatened to intercept on the High Seas when it was heading towards Beira, from which an oil pipeline would enable the oil to be sent to Rhodesia. This would have been in breach of the United Nations Security Council Resolution 217 (1965).

In February 1966 the MV Joanna V - still bearing the name MV Arietta Venezelos was located in the Persian Gulf when the Greek government instructed the owners, Venezelos SA to divert the ship to Rotterdam rather than South Africa and forbade the delivery of oil to Rhodesia.

The Joanna V was carrying 18,700 tons of oil when she was first detected by the Royal Navy's Beira Patrol. The Captain, Yiorgos Vardinogiannis, was warned not to proceed to Beira. However when the British government requested consent from the Greek government to use force, this permission was refused, although the Greek government did say they would endeavour to persuade Vardinoyannis not to do so. The British ship HMS Plymouth intercepted her, but as Vardinoyannis claimed she was simply putting into Beira for bunkering and provisions before taking the oil to Djibouti, the Joanna V was able to proceed to Beira unhindered. However, as there were no facilities to process the oil at Djibouti, his explanation was regarded as lacking credibility.

The British Ambassador to Greece, Ralph Murray raised the matter with Theoharis Rendis, the Greek undersecretary for Foreign Relations, who responded that the Greek government would accept the British interception of one of their ships if it had the backing of the United Nations. This led to the adoption of United Nations Security Council Resolution 221 on 9 April, which empowered "the United Kingdom to arrest and detain the tanker known as the Joanna V upon her departure from Beira in the event of her oil cargo being discharged there."
