= HMS Caprice =

C-class destroyer

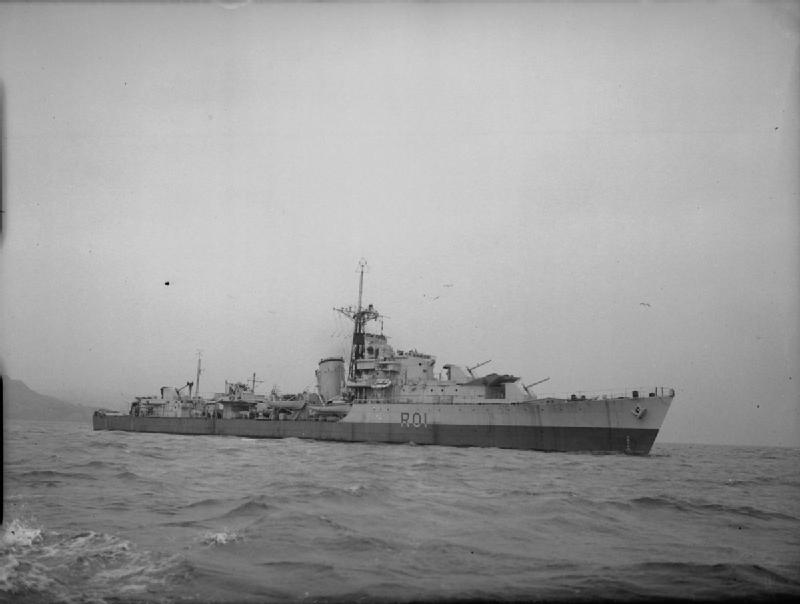
- HMS Caprice 1944 IWM A 24632

History

United Kingdom
- Name: HMS Caprice
- Ordered: 16 February 1942
- Builder: Yarrow, Scotstoun
- Laid down: 28 September 1942
- Launched: 16 September 1943
- Completed: 5 April 1944
- Commissioned: 5 April 1944
- Decommissioned: 1973
- Renamed: Built as Swallow; Renamed Caprice before launch
- Identification: Pennant number: R01 initially, but changed to D01 in 1945
- Fate: Arrived at Queenborough breaker's yard for scrapping, November 1979
- Badge: On a Field Green, a kid salient Proper.

General characteristics
- Class & type: C-class destroyer
- Displacement: 1,710 tons (standard) 2,520 tons (full)
- Length: 363 ft (111 m) o/a
- Beam: 35.75 ft (10.90 m)
- Draught: 10 ft (3.0 m) light, 14.5 ft (4.4 m) full
- Installed power: 2 Admiralty 3-drum boilers; 40,000 shp (30,000 kW)
- Propulsion: Parsons geared steam turbines, 2 shafts
- Speed: 37 knots (69 km/h)
- Range: 615 tons oil, 1,400 nautical miles (2,600 km) at 32 knots (59 km/h)
- Complement: 192 (1959)
- Armament: Initial; 3 × QF 4.5 in L/45 guns Mark IV on mounts CP Mk.V; 2 × Bofors 40 mm L/60 guns on twin mount "Hazemeyer" Mk.IV, or; 4 × QF 2 pdr L/39 guns Mk.VIII on quad mount Mk.VII; 4 × anti-aircraft mountings; Bofors 40 mm, single mount Mk.III; QF 2-pdr Mk VIII, single mount Mk.XVI; Oerlikon 20 mm, single mount P Mk.III; Oerlikon 20 mm, twin mount Mk.V; 2 × pentuple tubes for 21 inch (533 mm) torpedoes Mk.IX; 4 throwers and 2 racks for 96 depth charges; From 1966; 3 × QF 4.5 in L/45 guns Mark IV on mounts CP Mk.V; 2 × Bofors 40 mm L/60 guns; 6 × Squid anti submarine launchers (after modernization); 1 × Quadruple Sea Cat GWS-20 Launcher (from 1966)

HMS Caprice was a C-class destroyer of the Royal Navy, ordered on 16 February 1942 from Yarrow, Scotstoun. She was originally to be named HMS Swallow but this was changed to Caprice before launch to fit her revised class name. She is the only British warship to have had this name. She was adopted by the Civil Community of Bexley and Welling, as part of the Warship Week programme.

== Wartime service ==
On commissioning Caprice was allocated to the 6th Destroyer Flotilla with the Home Fleet and took part in Russian and Atlantic convoys and acted as escort to the ocean liners, Queen Elizabeth and Île de France on their high speed trooping runs. In 1945 she saw action in the Far East at the close of the Japanese War and received the surrender of some 5,000 Japanese prisoners at Uleeheue.

== Post war service ==
Following the war Caprice paid off into reserve. Along with other Ca group destroyers she was selected for modernisation by Yarrow in 1959. Work included a new enclosed bridge and Mark 6M gunnery fire control system, as well as the addition of two triple Squid anti-submarine mortars. Following the refit, Caprice was sent to the Far East, joining the 8th Destroyer Flotilla at Singapore. She remained in the Far East for four years before returning to Britain. On 1 January 1961, she was on passage from Hong Kong to Singapore when she responded to a distress signal from the Panamanian freighter SS Galatea, which had run aground on Pearson Reef in the Spratly Islands. Caprice saved 20 of the 21-man crew of Galatea, but Galatea's captain fell into the sea during the rescue attempts and died. Two of Caprice's crew were awarded the Queen's Commendation for Brave Conduct for their part in the rescue.

In 1963, Caprice left the Far East, joining the 21st Destroyer Squadron, and serving in the Mediterranean and the Caribbean. Under the Senior Naval Officer West Indies, at the time, Commodore Edward Ashmore, she was Guard ship at Georgetown, Guyana from May to July 1963 and then carried out anti-immigration patrols in the Bahamas from July to August that year. In 1966 Caprice (along with Cavalier) received the Sea Cat anti-aircraft missile system - the only two Ca ships to receive it. This meant losing the last of her torpedo tube armament.

In 1966–67, Caprice spent six months away from British waters, including three months on the Beira Patrol in the Mozambique Channel, as part of the oil blockade against Rhodesia, and three weeks at Aden where her security detachment supported the Army in the ongoing Aden Emergency. Three of the ship's crew were wounded during a gunpower demonstration when a WOMBAT recoilless rifle being used by the Army exploded. She returned to Portsmouth on 22 February 1967. On 25 January 1968 Caprice left England for the East of Suez leg of a General Service Commission. She visited Gibraltar, Freetown and Simonstown on the outwatrd leg and then spent a month on duty on the Beira Patrol. The ship arrived in Singapore on 6 April 1968. For the next five months she alternated between Singapore and Hong Kong, carrying out guard duties and exercising with other ships of the Australian, New Zealand and United States navies. During this period she also visited Japan. Leaving Singapore in early September, the ship headed south for a visit to Sydney and took part in exercise Coral Sands until October when the ship arrived in Auckland. She then went on to complete her round-the-world trip, returning to Portsmouth on 19 December 1969.

== Decommissioning and disposal ==
She was paid off in 1973 as the last war time destroyer in service. She was disarmed and laid up until November 1979 when she arrived at the breaker's yard at Queenborough for scrapping.

== Publications ==
- Colledge, J. J.; Warlow, Ben (2006) [1969]. Ships of the Royal Navy: The Complete Record of All Fighting Ships of the Royal Navy from the 15th Century to the Present (3rd Rev ed.). London: Chatham Publishing. ISBN 978-1-86176-281-8. OCLC 67375475.
- Critchley, Mike (1982). British Warships Since 1945: Part 3: Destroyers. Liskeard, UK: Maritime Books. ISBN 0-9506323-9-2.
- English, John (2008). Obdurate to Daring: British Fleet Destroyers 1941–45. Windsor, UK: World Ship Society. ISBN 978-0-9560769-0-8.
- Marriott, Leo (1989). Royal Navy Destroyers Since 1945. Ian Allan Ltd. ISBN 0-7110-1817-0.
