= Street View Trusted =

Virtual tour service started by Google

Google Business Photos (now called "Indoor Street View") is a virtual tour service started by Google. It uses the same photography technique used in Google Street View in order to offer 360˚ interactive panoramas inside businesses. Once the virtual tour is published by Google, the link to the tour is displayed directly on the search results page. The tour is also published on Google+ Local (now just called Google+) pages and Google Maps. A user visiting a business published virtual tour can navigate inside the business in the same way a user of Google Street View can navigate roads, streets and highways.

== History ==
Google Business Photos first established by Google in April 2010, and at first was available in approximately 30 cities across the US, Australia, and Japan. By January, 2013, 100,000 businesses had arranged for Google Maps users to tour inside their premises. Google re-branded Google Business Photos to Business View in 2014. In 2015, Google announced that they are again re-branding Business View to Street View.

At the Street View Summit in May 2016, Google announced several changes to the program. In order to become Trusted, photographers must publish 50 high-quality maps-approved photo spheres that are 14MP or larger, without any significant stitching errors or artifacts.

== Photography ==
The virtual tours are photographed by Google Trusted Photographers or Google Trusted Agencies. These photographers are independent contractors and are not employed by Google. Google has certified them because they meet Google's standards of quality for taking the feature pictures and panoramic pictures. Businesses pay the photographers to take the interior photos.
