= United Nations Security Council Resolution 221 =

UN Security Council Resolution 221
- Date: April 9 1966
- Meeting no.: 1277
- Subject: Question concerning the situation in Southern Rhodesia
- Voting summary: 10 voted for; None voted against; 5 abstained
- Result: Adopted

Security Council composition
- Permanent members: China; France; Soviet Union; United Kingdom; United States
- Non-permanent members: Argentina; Bulgaria; Japan; Jordan; Mali; Netherlands; New Zealand; Nigeria; Uganda; Uruguay

United Nations Security Council Resolution 221 was adopted by the United Nations Security Council on April 9, 1966. The Council, concerned that Southern Rhodesia might receive a large supply of oil from tanker MV Joanna V, which was docked in Beira, ordered Portugal to prevent the movement of oil along the Companhia do Pipeline Moçambique Rodésias pipeline.

The Council called upon all member states to divert vessels suspected of transporting oil to Southern Rhodesia. The resolution ordered the United Kingdom to prevent, by force if necessary, any vessels suspected of carrying oil to Southern Rhodesia from arriving at Beira.

Resolution 221 passed with ten votes to none. The People's Republic of Bulgaria, France, Mali, the Soviet Union and Uruguay abstained.

== See also ==
- List of United Nations Security Council Resolutions 201 to 300 (1965–1971)
- The Beira Patrol
