= Coleophora teredo =

Scientific classification
- Kingdom: Animalia
- Phylum: Arthropoda
- Class: Insecta
- Order: Lepidoptera
- Family: Coleophoridae
- Genus: Coleophora
- Species: C. teredo

Binomial name
- Coleophora teredo (Falkovitsh, 1994)

Synonyms
- Tritemachia teredo Falkovitsh, 1994

Species of moth

Coleophora teredo is a moth of the family Coleophoridae. It is found in southern Russia and central Asia. It occurs in desert-steppe biotopes.

Adults are on wing from May to June.

The larvae feed on the carpels of Anabasis aphylla.
