= HMS Cavalier =

C-class destroyer

Coordinates: 51.394982°N 0.526637°E

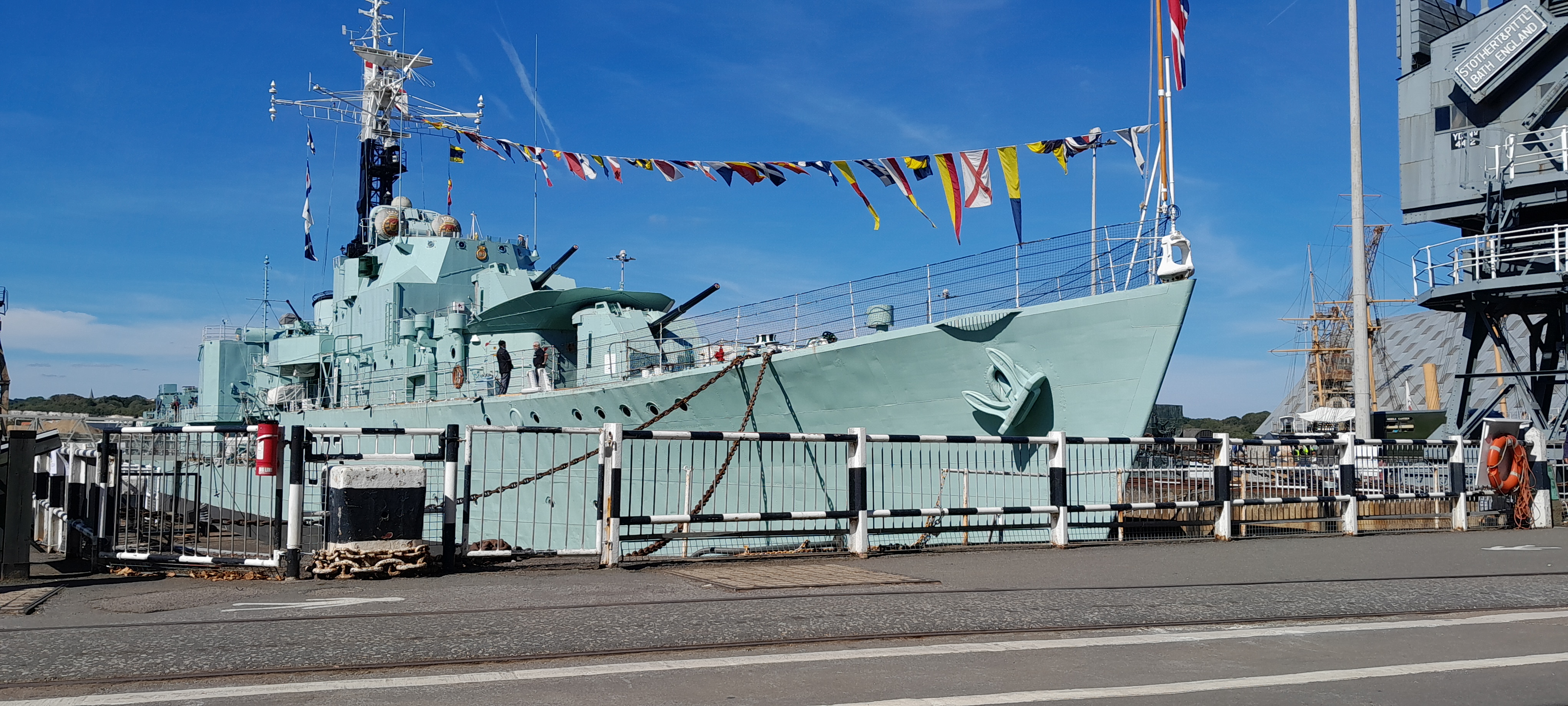
- HMS Cavalier, September 2024, as she appears at Chatham Dockyard.

History

United Kingdom
- Name: HMS Cavalier
- Builder: J. Samuel White and Company, Cowes, Isle of Wight
- Laid down: 28 March 1943
- Launched: 7 April 1944
- Commissioned: 22 November 1944
- Decommissioned: 1972
- Identification: Pennant number: R73 (later D73)
- Motto: "Of one Company"
- Fate: Sold 21 October 1977.
- Status: Preserved as a museum ship since 1998

General characteristics
- Class & type: C-class destroyer
- Displacement: 1,710 tons (standard) 2,520 tons (full)
- Length: 363 ft (111 m) o/a
- Beam: 35.75 ft (10.90 m)
- Draught: 10 ft (3.0 m) light, 14.5 ft (4.4 m) full, 16 ft (4.9 m) max
- Propulsion: 2 Admiralty 3-drum boilers, Parsons geared steam turbines, 40,000 shp (30,000 kW), 2 shafts
- Speed: 37 knots (69 km/h)
- Range: 615 tons oil, 1,400 nautical miles (2,600 km) at 32 knots (59 km/h)
- Complement: 186
- Armament: 3 × QF 4.5-inch (113 mm) L/45 guns Mark IV on mounts CP Mk.V; 2 × Bofors 40 mm L/60 guns on twin mount "Hazemeyer" Mk.IV, 4 × anti-aircraft mountings; Bofors 40 mm, single mount Mk.III; QF 2-pdr Mk VIII, single mount Mk.XVI; Oerlikon 20 mm, single mount P Mk.III; Oerlikon 20 mm, twin mount Mk.V; 2 × quintuple tubes for 21 inch (533 mm) torpedoes Mk.IX (at launch, after tubes replaced by Squid mortars, forward tubes replaced later).; 4 throwers and 2 racks for 96 depth charges; 1 × quadruple GWS20 Seacat SAM launcher (from September 1964); 2 × triple Squid anti-submarine mortar (from 1957)

HMS Cavalier is a retired C-class destroyer of the Royal Navy. She was laid down by J. Samuel White and Company at East Cowes on 28 March 1943, launched on 7 April 1944, and commissioned on 22 November 1944. She served in World War II and in various commissions in the Far East until she was decommissioned in 1972. After decommissioning she was preserved as a museum ship and currently resides at Chatham Historic Dockyard.

== Construction ==
Cavalier was one of 96 War Emergency Programme destroyers ordered between 1940 and 1942. She was one of the first ships to be built with the forward and aft portions of her hull welded, with the midsection riveted to ensure strength. The new process gave the ship additional speed. In 1970 a 64-mile race was arranged between Cavalier and the frigate Rapid, which had the same hull form and machinery. Cavalier beat Rapid by 30 yards (27 m) after Rapid lifted a safety valve, reaching an average speed of 31.8 knots (58.9 km/h).

== Service history ==
After commissioning, she joined the 6th Destroyer Flotilla, part of the Home Fleet, and took part in a number of operations off Norway. Most notably in February 1945 she was despatched with the destroyers Myngs and Scorpion to reinforce a convoy from the Kola Inlet in Russia, which had suffered attacks from enemy aircraft and U-boats, and had subsequently been scattered by a violent storm. She and the other escorts reformed the convoy, and returned to Britain with the loss of only three of the 34 ships. This action earned Cavalier a battle honour.

Later in 1945, Cavalier was despatched to the Far East, where she provided naval gunfire support during the Battle of Surabaya. In February 1946, she went to Bombay to help quell the Royal Indian Navy Mutiny. After some time in the British Pacific Fleet she was paid off in May 1946 and was placed in reserve at Portsmouth.

From 1955 to 1957, Cavalier was modernised at Thornycroft's Woolston, Southampton shipyard, removing some of her torpedo tubes and a 4.5-inch gun in favour of two Squid anti-submarine mortars. She recommissioned on 16 June 1957, replacing Comus in the 8th Destroyer Squadron in Singapore. From March to April 1958, Cavalier took part in the Operation Grapple, the British nuclear weapon tests at Malden Island and Kiritimati. In August 1959, Cavalier was ordered to the important RAF base at Gan Island in the Maldives in response to civil unrest, remaining there until relieved by sister ship Caprice on 29 August. In December 1962, she transported 180 troops from Singapore to Brunei to help suppress a rebellion that became part of the Indonesia-Malaysia Confrontation.

After disembarking the troops she remained in Brunei as a communications centre for several days until other Royal Navy ships arrived to relieve her. On 21 May 1964, Cavalier was being towed by the tug RFA Reward to Gibraltar for refit when she was in collision with the Liberian tanker Burgan, about 35 nmi (40 mi; 65 km) south-west of Brighton. Cavalier's bows were badly damaged, while one of Burgan's crew suffered head injuries and had to be airlifted to hospital. Cavalier underwent temporary repairs at Portsmouth before being fitted with a new bow at Devonport. She finally underwent the planned refit at Gibraltar from August 1964 to April 1966.

On 6 July 1971, Cavalier participated in a race against a similar ship, Rapid. Cavalier narrowly won the race after a safety valve blew on Rapid. Cavalier was presented with the 'Cock o' the Fleet' award. The award can be seen on the ship's bridge to this day. Cavalier was decommissioned in 1972 and is the last surviving British destroyer of the Second World War still in Britain.

== Fate ==
After decommissioning at Chatham Dockyard, she was laid up in Portsmouth. As a unique survivor, after a five-year campaign led by Lord Louis Mountbatten, the ship was purchased by the Cavalier Trust for £65,000 and handed over on Trafalgar Day 1977 in Portsmouth. By selling the ship to the trust, the UK government and the Royal Navy severed all formal connection and responsibility for the ship. A special warrant was issued that allows her to retain the prefix "HMS" (His Majesty's Ship) and fly the White Ensign, a privilege normally only enjoyed by commissioned ships of the Royal Navy. A similar privilege is enjoyed by another museum ship, the cruiser Belfast.

Moved to Southampton, Cavalier opened as a museum and memorial ship in August 1982. This was not commercially successful, and in October 1983 the ship was moved to Brighton, where she formed the centrepiece of a newly built yacht marina.

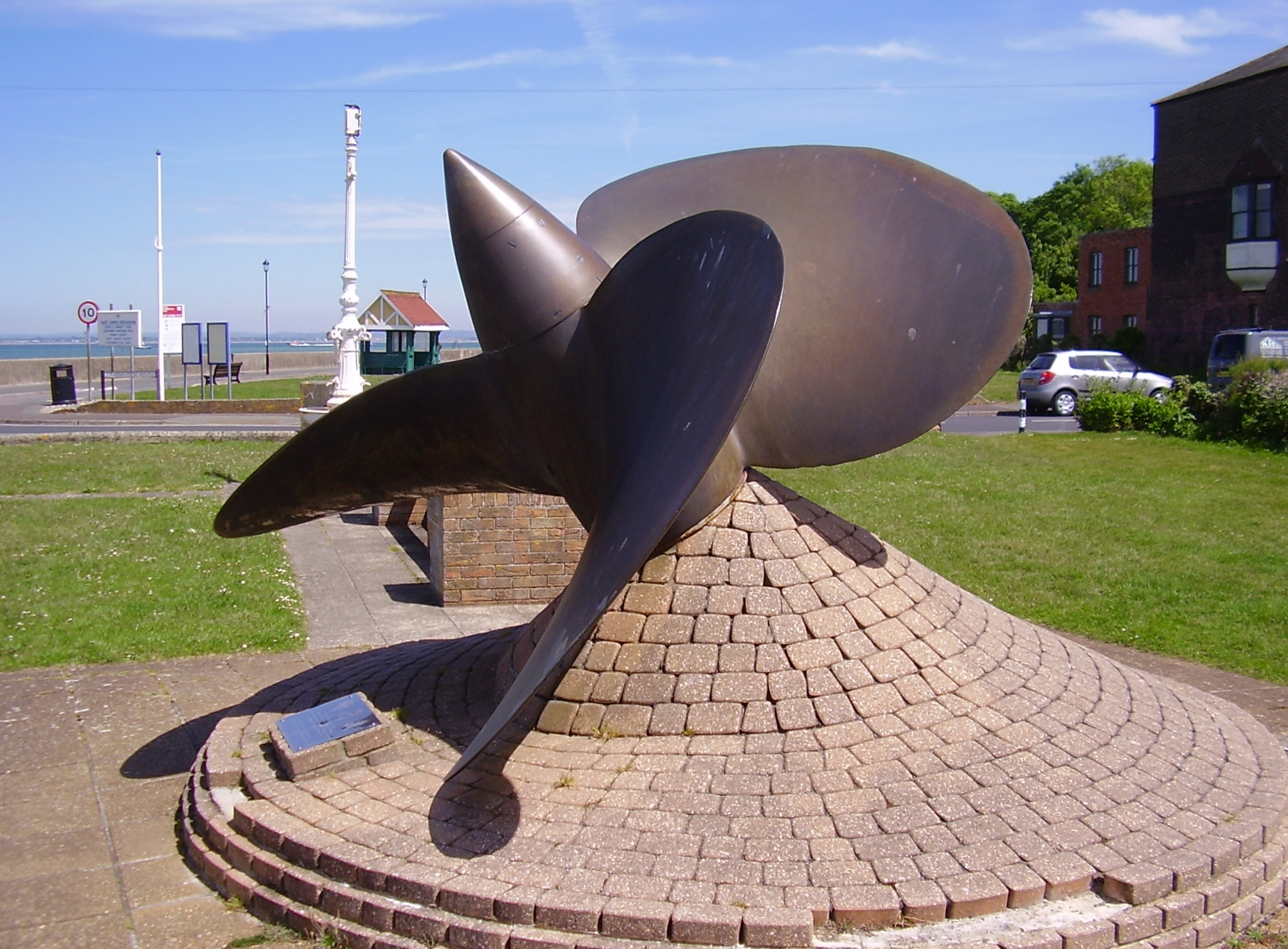
Propeller from HMS Cavalier erected in 1995 as a memorial on the esplanade at East Cowes, Isle of Wight, "in recognition of the shipbuilders of J. Samuel White and the sailors who gave their lives for their country".

In 1987, the ship was brought to the River Tyne to form the main attraction of a national shipbuilding exhibition centre planned by South Tyneside Metropolitan Borough Council in the former shipyard of Hawthorn Leslie and Company, builders of many similar destroyers. The plans for the museum came to nothing, and the borough council, faced with annual maintenance costs of £30,000 and a hardening of public opinion against unnecessary expenditure, resolved to sell the ship and wind up the venture in 1996. The ship sat in a dry dock (owing to a previous list) in a rusting condition, awaiting a buyer or scrapping in situ.

After the reforming of the Cavalier Trust, and a debate in Parliament, in 1998 Cavalier was bought by Chatham Historic Dockyard for display as a museum ship. Arriving on 23 May 1998, Cavalier now resides in No. 2 dry-dock.

On 14 November 2007, Cavalier was officially designated as a war memorial to the 142 Royal Navy destroyers sunk during World War II and the 11,000 men killed on those ships. The unveiling of a bronze monument created by the artist Kenneth Potts was conducted by Prince Philip, Duke of Edinburgh. The monument is adjacent to the ship at the Historic Dockyard in Chatham, Kent.

In the summer of 2009 the Chatham Historic Dockyard Trust made available accommodation on board the ship for youth groups who wish to stay on board and experience life on board a Royal Naval destroyer.

In September 2010, Cavalier fired a full broadside from the ship. This was due to the work of the heritage naval gun crew who restored all three 4.5-in guns back to working condition in conjunction with the Chatham Historic Dockyard Trust.

In April 2014 Cavalier was added to Google Maps Business View (formerly Google Business Photos) in celebration of the 70th anniversary of her launch. The tour, which includes Cavalier's engine and gear room, was enhanced with interactive audio hotspots to enable visitors with accessibility issues to explore the ship.

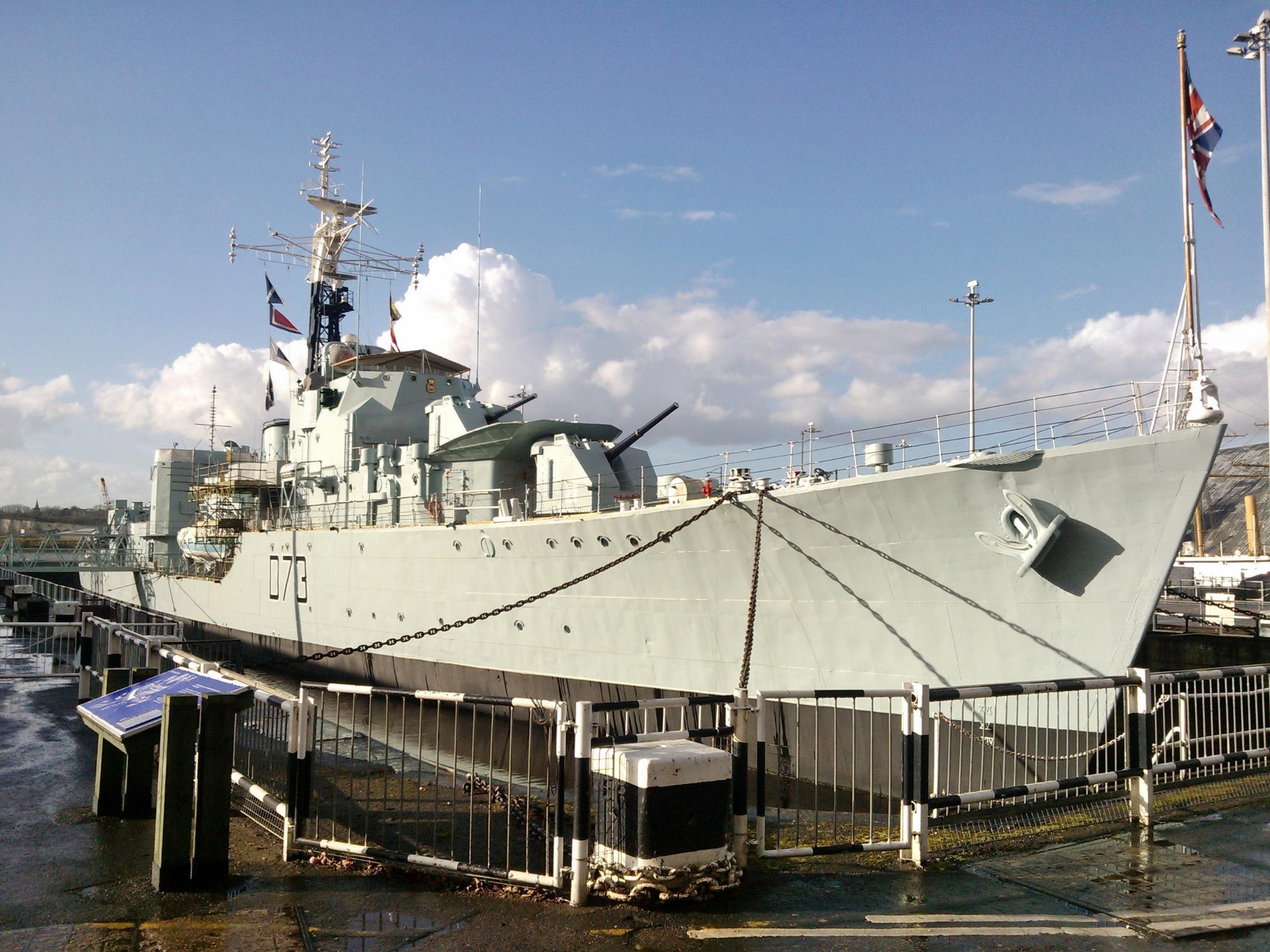
Cavalier in 2014

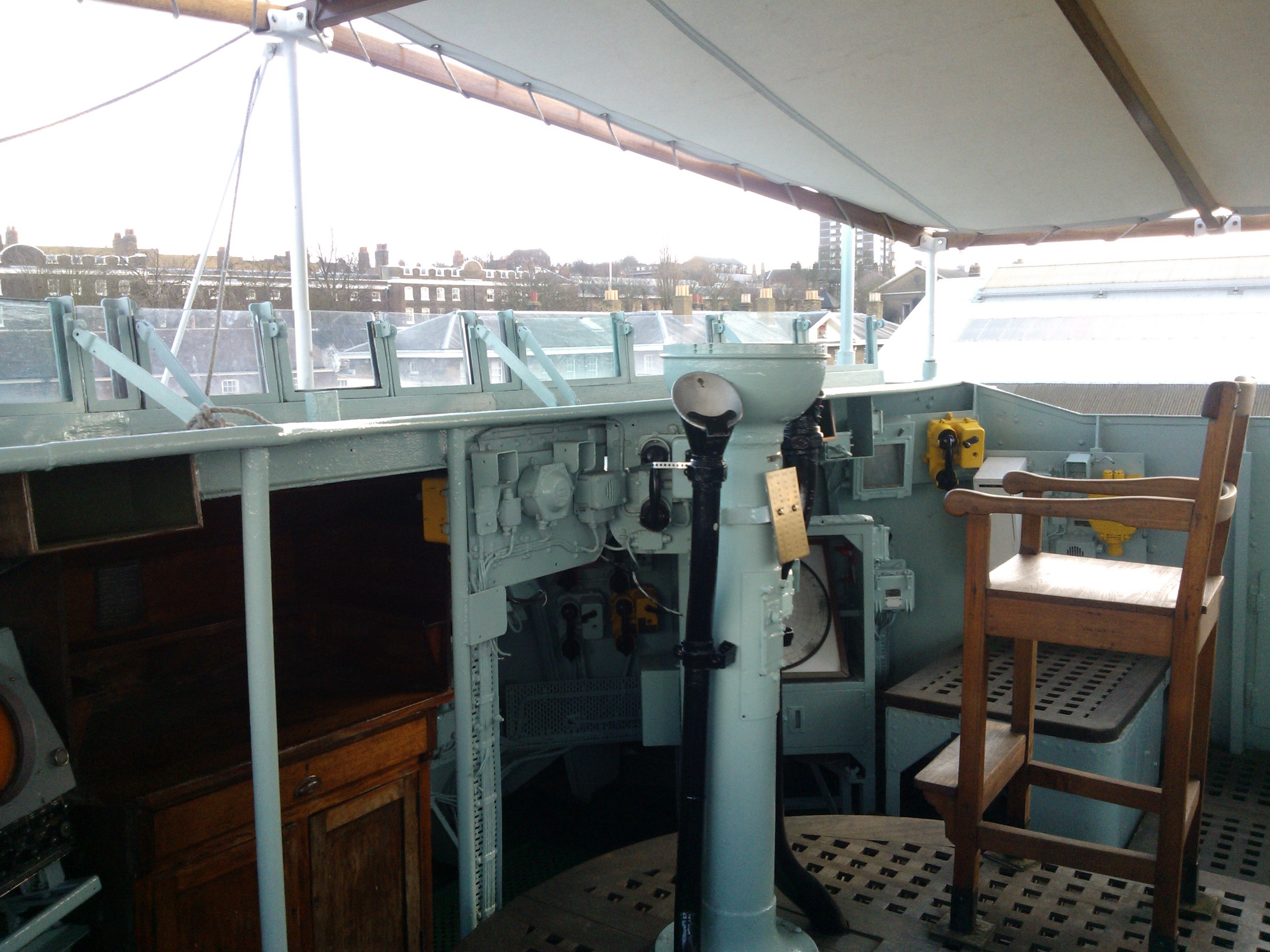
Navigation bridge

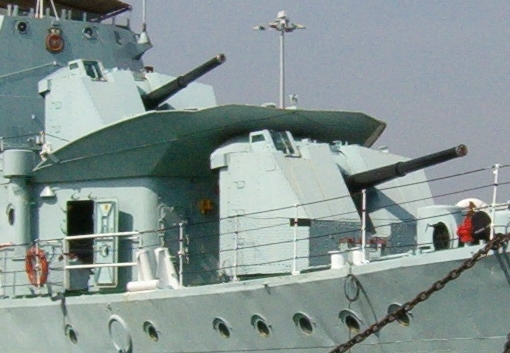
Forward 4.5in guns

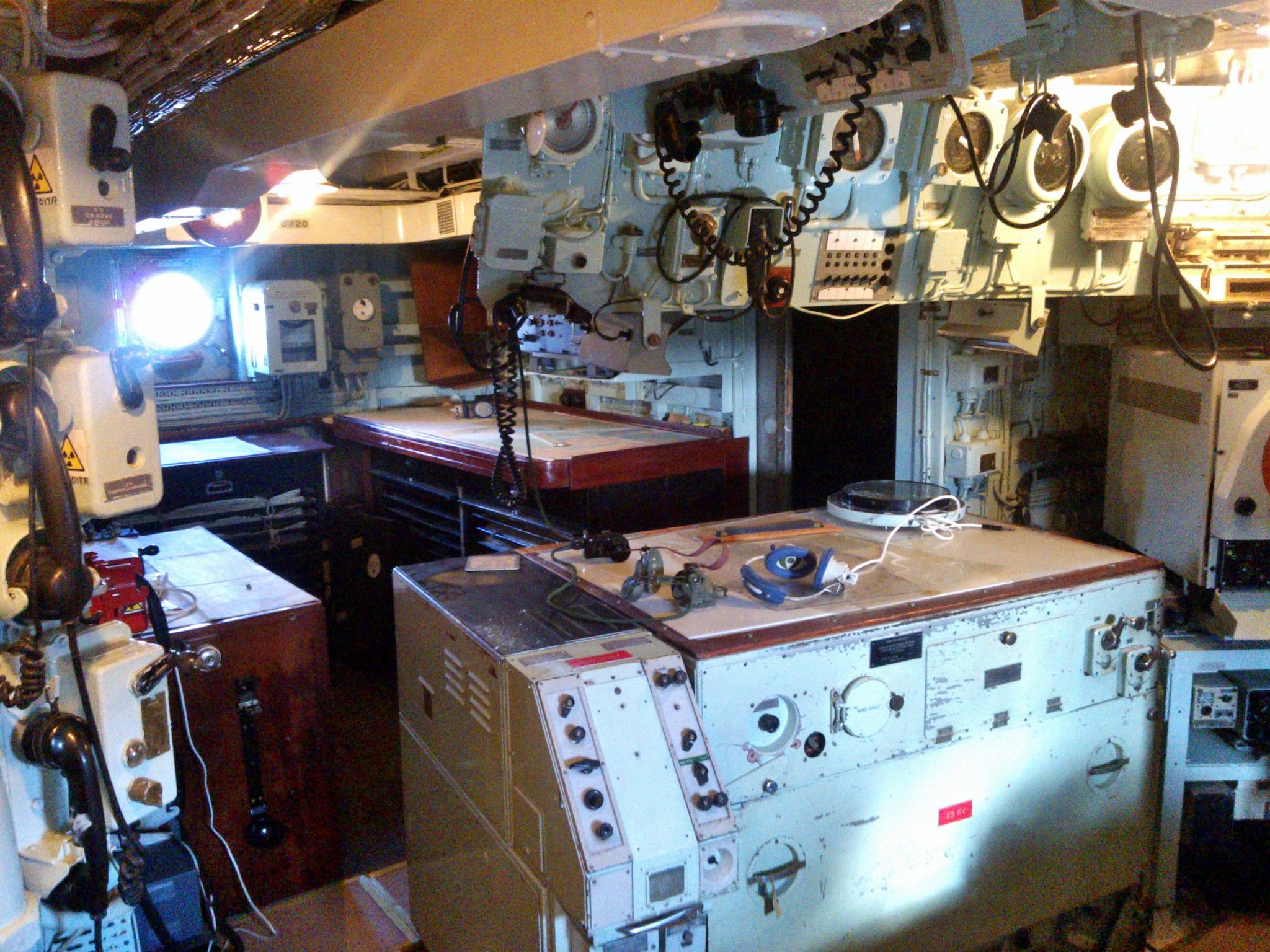
Operations room

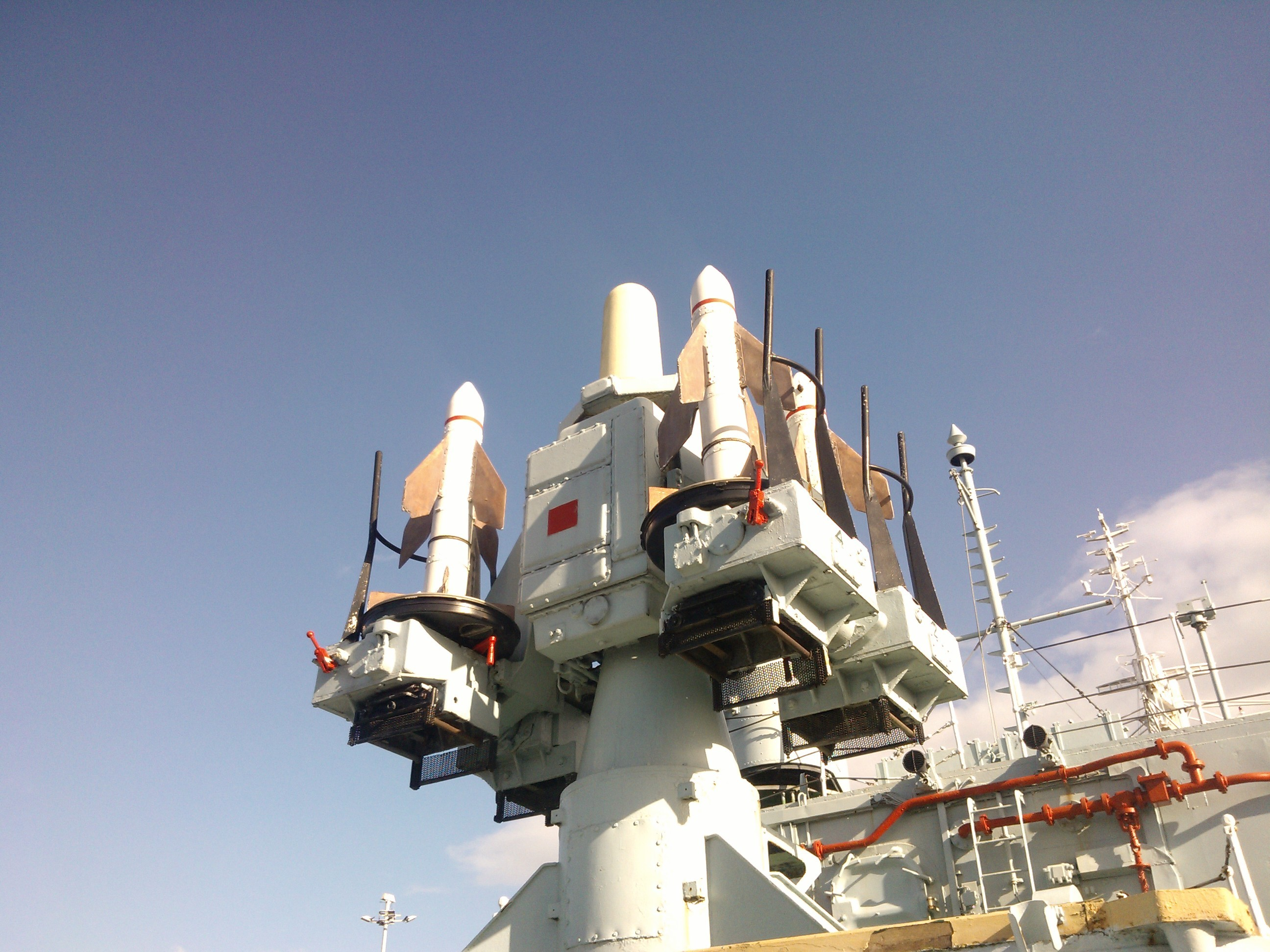
Seacat launcher

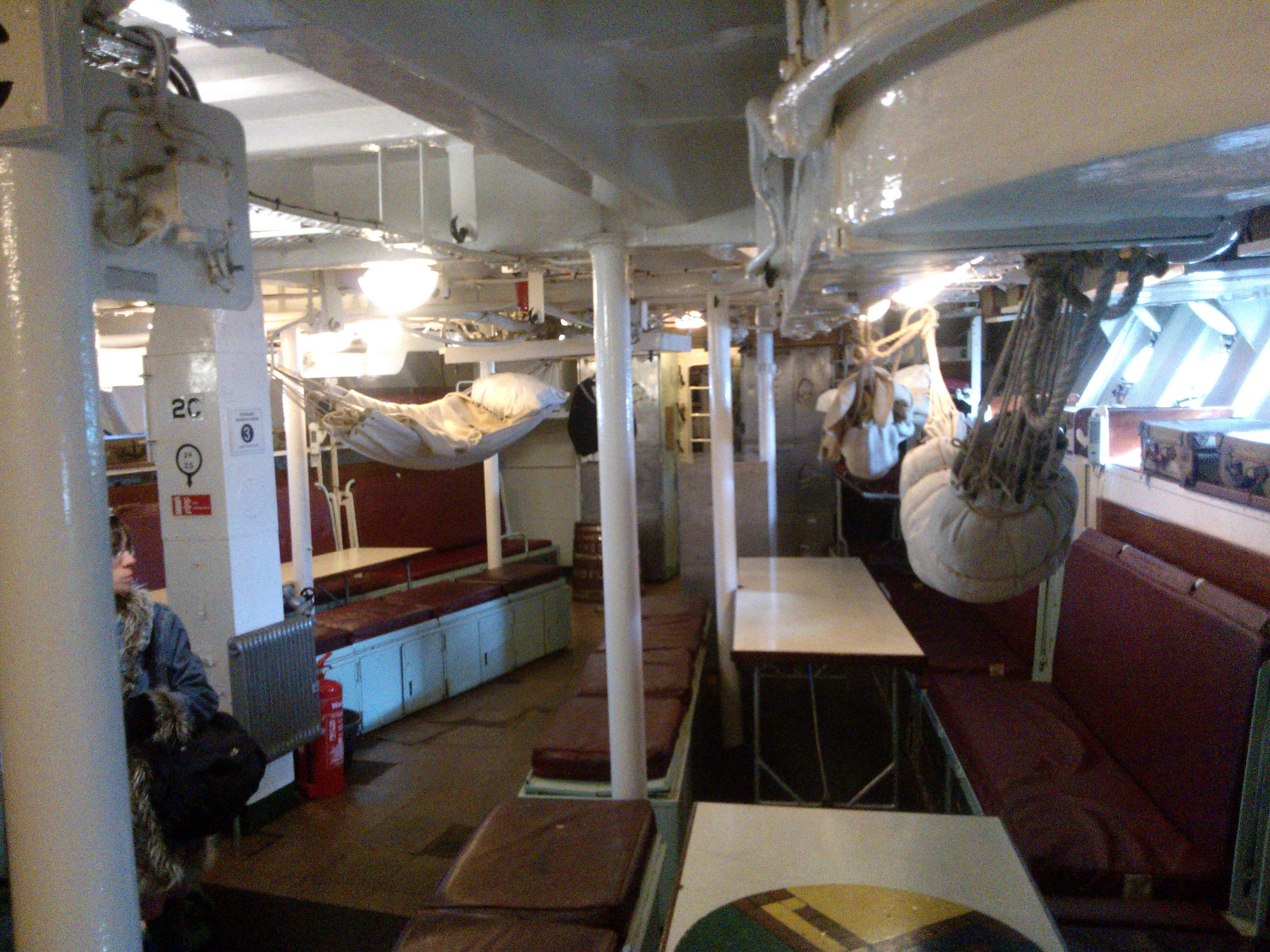
Seaman's mess

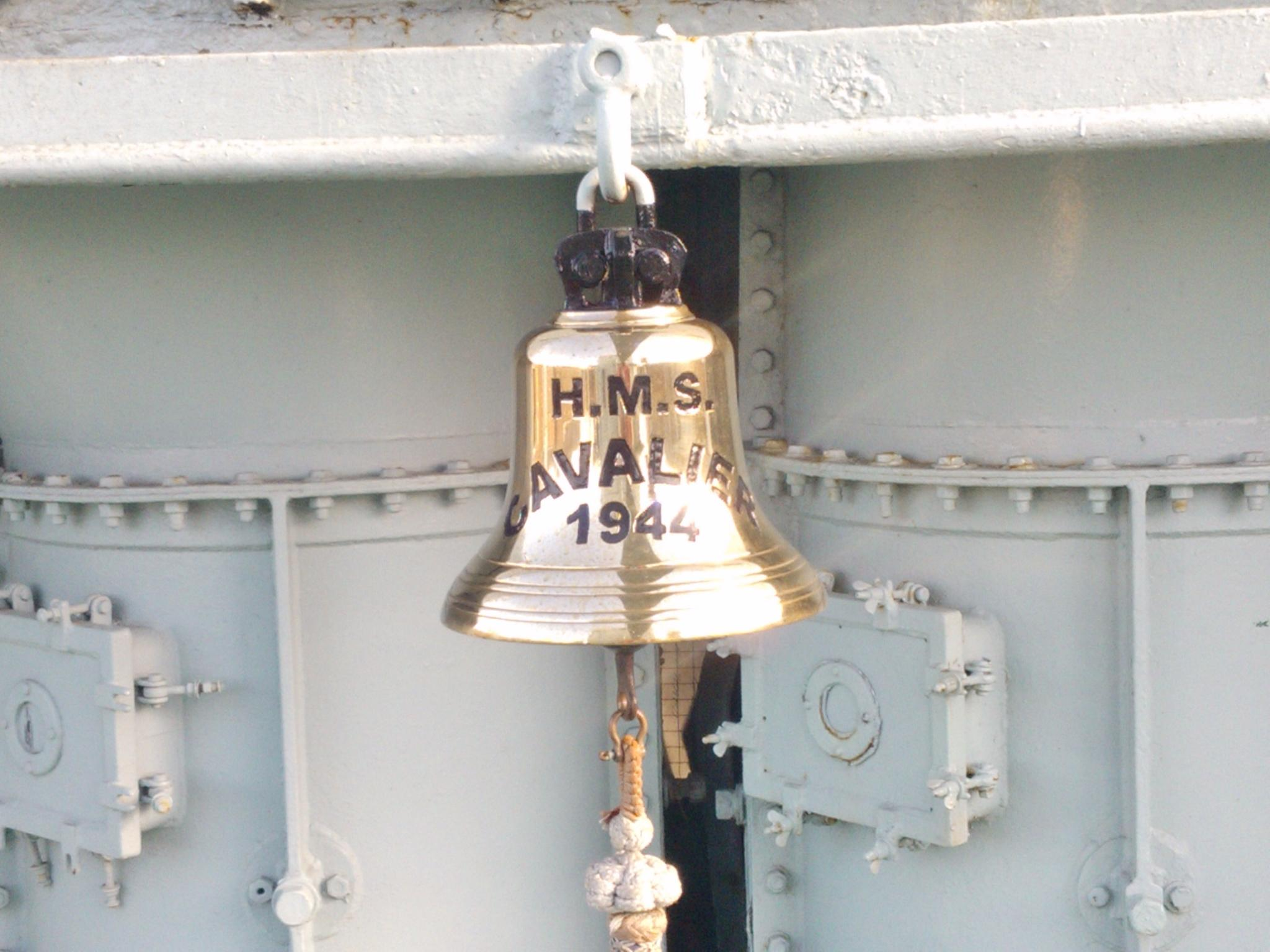
Ship's bell

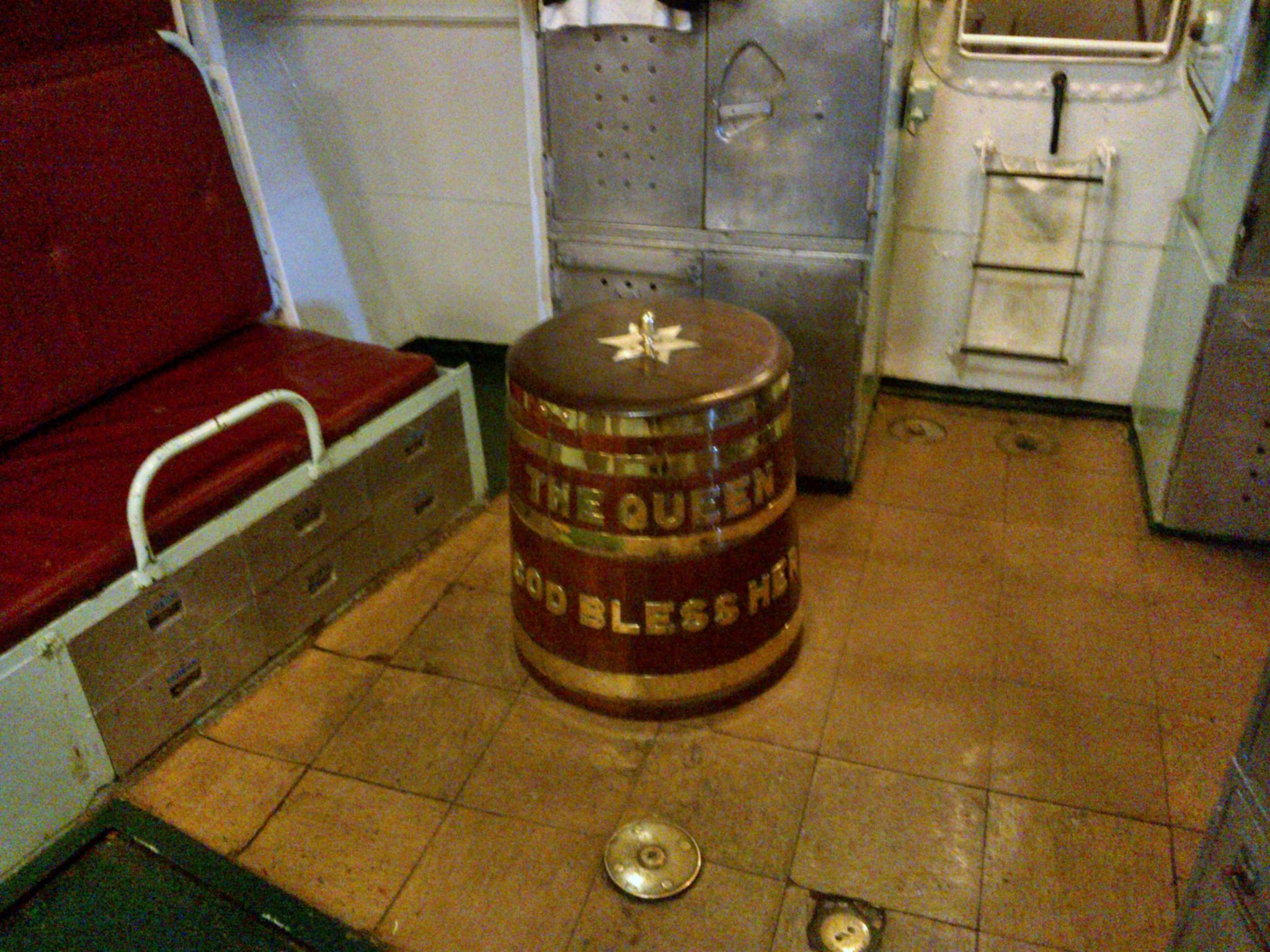
The grog tub

== Bibliography ==
- Colledge, J. J.; Warlow, Ben (2006) [1969]. Ships of the Royal Navy: The Complete Record of All Fighting Ships of the Royal Navy from the 15th Century to the Present (3rd Rev ed.). London: Chatham Publishing. ISBN 978-1-86176-281-8. OCLC 67375475.
- English, John (2008). Obdurate to Daring: British Fleet Destroyers 1941–45. Windsor, UK: World Ship Society. ISBN 978-0-9560769-0-8.
- Marriott, Leo (1989). Royal Navy Destroyers Since 1945. Ian Allan Ltd. ISBN 0-7110-1817-0.
- McMurtrie, Francis E., ed. (1989). Jane's Fighting Ships of World War II. Crescent Books/Random House. ISBN 0-51767-963-9.
- Roberts, John (2009). Safeguarding the Nation: The Story of the Modern Royal Navy. Annapolis, Maryland, USA: Naval Institute Press. ISBN 978-1-59114-812-8.
- Johnstone-Bryden, Richard (2015). HMS Cavalier: Destroyer 1944. Seaforth Publishing. ISBN 978-1-84832-226-4.
- David L. Williams, Richard P. De Kerbrech (2012). J. Samuel White and Co., Shipbuilders. History Press Limited. ISBN 978-0-75246-612-5.
