= 2nd Destroyer Squadron =

- Active: November 1956 – 1971
- Country: United Kingdom
- Branch: Royal Navy
- Size: Squadron

Commanders
- First: Captain George I.M. Balfour
- Last: Captain Harry R. Keate

The 2nd Destroyer Squadron was an administrative unit of the Royal Navy from 1956 to 1971.

== Operational history ==
In October 1956 the 2nd Destroyer Flotilla was on general assignment when it was disbanded and succeeded by the 2nd Destroyer Squadron in November 1956. During its existence, the squadron included Daring-class destroyers and Leander-class frigates.

== Deployments ==
Included:

from	to	deployed to	additional notes
February 1956	March 1956	Mediterranean Fleet	
March 1956	January 1957	Home Fleet	
January 1957	January 1958	Mediterranean Fleet	
January 1958	January 1959	Not assigned	all ships are re-fitting
January 1959	April 1959	Home Fleet	
April 1959	April 1960	Mediterranean Fleet	temporary assignment to Far East Fleet
April 1960	January 1961	Home Fleet	
February 1961	1966	Far East Fleet	
April 1967	August 1971	Far East Fleet	re-designated 2nd Far East Destroyer Squadron

== Squadron commander ==
Commander	Ship	Dates
Captain George I.M. Balfour	HMS Daring	November 1956 – 1958
Captain Charles P. Mills	HMS Daring	January 1959-December 1960
Captain A. Gordon Tait	HMS Ajax	1961 -December 1966
Captain George A. de G. Kitchin	HMS Ajax	December 1966-May 1968
Captain Alfred R. Rawbone	HMS Ajax	May 1968 – 1969
Captain Harry R. Keate	HMS Ajax	September 1969 – 1971

== See also ==
- List of squadrons and flotillas of the Royal Navy
