= HMS Teredo =

Submarine of the Royal Navy

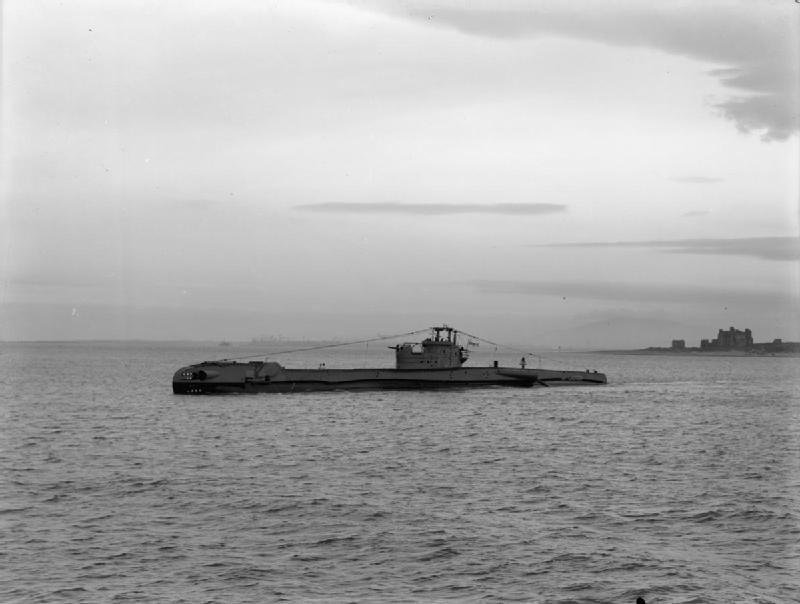
- HMS Teredo

History

United Kingdom
- Name: HMS Teredo
- Builder: Vickers-Armstrongs, Barrow
- Laid down: 17 April 1944
- Launched: 27 April 1945
- Commissioned: 13 April 1946
- Fate: Scrapped June 1965
- Badge

General characteristics
- Class & type: British T class submarine
- Displacement: 1,290 tons surfaced; 1,560 tons submerged
- Length: 276 ft 6 in (84.28 m)
- Beam: 25 ft 6 in (7.77 m)
- Draught: 12 ft 9 in (3.89 m) forward; 14 ft 7 in (4.45 m) aft
- Propulsion: Two shafts; Twin diesel engines 2,500 hp (1.86 MW) each; Twin electric motors 1,450 hp (1.08 MW) each
- Speed: 15.5 knots (28.7 km/h) surfaced; 9 knots (20 km/h) submerged
- Range: 4,500 nautical miles at 11 knots (8,330 km at 20 km/h) surfaced
- Test depth: 300 ft (91 m) max
- Armament: 6 internal forward-facing 21 inch (533 mm) torpedo tubes; 2 external forward-facing torpedo tubes; 2 external amidships rear-facing torpedo tubes; 1 external rear-facing torpedo tubes; 6 reload torpedoes; QF 4 inch (100 mm) deck gun; 3 anti aircraft machine guns

HMS Teredo was a British submarine of the third group of the T class. She was built as P338 at Vickers-Armstrongs, Barrow and launched on 27 April 1945. So far she has been the only ship of the Royal Navy to bear the name Teredo, possibly after a mollusc, the shipworm, of that name.

Commissioned after the end of the Second World War, Teredo had a relatively peaceful career. Gordon Tait commanded her in 1947 to 1948. In 1953 she took part in the Fleet Review to celebrate the Coronation of Queen Elizabeth II. She was finally scrapped at Briton Ferry, Wales on 5 June 1965.

== Publications ==
- Colledge, J. J.; Warlow, Ben (2006) [1969]. Ships of the Royal Navy: The Complete Record of All Fighting Ships of the Royal Navy from the 15th Century to the Present (3rd Rev ed.). London: Chatham Publishing. ISBN 978-1-86176-281-8. OCLC 67375475.
- Hutchinson, Robert (2001). Jane's Submarines: War Beneath the Waves from 1776 to the Present Day. London: HarperCollins. ISBN 978-0-00-710558-8. OCLC 53783010.
