= HMS Junella =

British ship

History

United Kingdom
- Name: HMS Junella
- Builder: Clelands Shipbuilding Company, Wallsend
- Acquired: Taken up from trade 11 April 1982
- Commissioned: April 1982
- Decommissioned: August 1982
- Identification: IMO number: 7366142
- Fate: Returned to owners, August 1982; Scrapped, 19 July 1999

General characteristics
- Type: Mine countermeasures vessel
- Tonnage: 1,650 GRT
- Length: 217 feet (66 m)
- Beam: 43 feet (13 m)
- Installed power: Single 3,180 brake horsepower (2,370 kW) diesel engine
- Speed: 15.5 knots (28.7 km/h; 17.8 mph)

Service record
- Commanders: Lieutenant Mark Rowledge
- Operations: Falklands War

Junella was a fishing trawler, best known for her service with the Royal Navy (as mine countermeasures vessel HMS Junella) during the Falklands War. She was built in 1975 for J Marr & Son, a Hull-based fishing company. On 11 April 1982, she was taken up from trade by the British government and commissioned into the Royal Navy. She was fitted with Second World War-era minesweeping gear at Rosyth Dockyard, manned by Royal Navy sailors and allocated to the 11th Mine Countermeasures Squadron. She sailed on 26 April but was unable to commence sweeping until after the 14 June Argentine surrender. In the meantime, she was utilised to transfer troops and stores between ships and landed special forces troops at San Carlos. Demining operations commenced on 21 June. Junella returned to the United Kingdom on 11 August, carrying a defused Argentine mine.

Junella was returned to commercial use after the war and in 1983 was sold to the Royal Greenland Trading Department, being renamed Siku. She served with several other companies afterwards under the names Vesttraal and Hill Cove before returning to the name Junella with SA (Fripur), fishing out of Montevideo, Uruguay. After being damaged by fire she was scrapped on 19 July 1999.

== Early career ==
Junella was ordered by J Marr & Son, a Hull-based fishing company. She was built on the Tyne at Wallsend by the Clelands Shipbuilding Company (part of Swan Hunter) in 1975. Junella was the first trawler with thermal fluid heating built for the British fleet. She was also the last freezer trawler built for the British fleet, until at least 1987. Junella measured 217 feet (66 m) in length and 43 feet (13 m) in beam; her gross register tonnage was 1615 tons and her single 3,180 brake horsepower (2,370 kW) diesel engine gave her a top speed of around 15.5 knots (28.7 km/h; 17.8 mph).

On 28 October 1980, Junella struck rocks off Eilean Trodday, in The Minch, Scotland during force 9 winds. Her hull was damaged and she was drydocked at Hull for repairs.

== Falklands War ==
=== Requisition and conversion ===
Argentina invaded the British dependent territory of the Falkland Islands, in the South Atlantic, on 2 April 1982. The British military was instructed to assemble a task force to retake the islands. It was suspected that the task force would face Argentine naval mines laid on the approaches to the islands and a decision was made on 9 April to take up suitable ships from trade for use as mine countermeasures vessels. The Royal Navy had a number of Ton-class minesweepers, designed for coastal work, but judged these too small to make the trip to the South Atlantic. Three of the newly-built Hunt-class mine countermeasures vessels were in service but had insufficient range to reach the Falklands without being accompanied by a mother ship. RMS St Helena was taken in hand for conversion to this role but would not be ready for the start of the campaign. To fill the gap the navy looked to take up a number of deep sea fishing trawlers for conversion into mine countermeasures vessels. They searched for vessels of 1,200–1,500 long tons (1,200–1,500 t) displacement, capable of approximately 17 knots (31 km/h; 20 mph) speed and with a fuel endurance of 60 days. The J Marr & Son vessels Junella, Cordella, Farnella and Northella were chosen along with the British United Trawlers vessel Pict.

Junella was taken up from trade on 11 April and proceeded to Rosyth Dockyard for conversion to her new role. Upon arrival some 60 long tons (61 t) of fish had to be unloaded before works could commence. She was converted between 15 and 24 April, being fitted with Second World War vintage minesweeping equipment that the navy had in storage. The mission became more urgent on 12 April when a British submarine, HMS Spartan, confirmed the presence of moored mines in the eastern approaches to Port Stanley. The vessel was commissioned into the Royal Navy as HMS Junella and assigned a crew drawn from the 1st Mine Countermeasures Squadron and the Fishery Protection Squadron. Junella's original merchant navy crew requested permission to accompany the vessel to the South Atlantic, either as civilians or by enlistment in the navy, but the request was denied. A small number were retained on board to train the navy crew until the vessel reached Freetown, Sierra Leone. In Royal Navy service, Junella was referred to as an Extra Deep Armed Team Sweep (EDATS) trawler and assigned to the 11th Mine Countermeasures Squadron. She was commanded by Royal Navy Lieutenant Mark Rowledge during the war.

=== Service history ===
Junella left Rosyth on 26 April, sailing for Portland Harbour in Dorset, where she underwent trials of her minesweeping gear. She departed for the South Atlantic the following day, travelling via Freetown and Ascension Island. On her arrival in the Falklands, the threat of Argentine aerial attack was too severe for her to operate inshore in her minesweeping role. In the meantime, Junella and the other ships of the 11th Squadron were used to cross-transfer equipment and personnel between vessels of the taskforce. Some 250 long tons (250 t) of equipment as well as troops were transferred off the ocean liner Queen Elizabeth 2; a difficult process as the trawlers struggled to stay close enough to the liner without damaging her hull. The equipment was transferred by being passed along chains of soldiers through the corridors of the Queen Elizabeth 2 and out her side doors. Junella was also used to transfer stores from Saxonia to ships of the Royal Fleet Auxiliary. In preparation for the landings at San Carlos, the trawler transferred members of the 5th Infantry Brigade from Queen Elizabeth 2 to Norland and Canberra. During the 21 to 25 May Battle of San Carlos, Junella was used to land and take-off special forces troops of the Special Air Service and Special Boat Service from the beach, a role for which she was found to be particularly well-suited.

Argentine forces in the Falklands surrendered on 14 June with the capital, Port Stanley, reoccupied by British forces. Amongst the paperwork discovered was a map of the naval minefields which, together with the removal of the threat from Argentine aircraft, allowed minesweeping to commence on 21 June. Junella and other ships of the squadron removed 10 of the 21 known mines before being relieved by the Hunt class minesweepers HMS Brecon and HMS Ledbury on 10 July. The trawlers worked to sweep the minefield to cut the moorings after which the mines floated to the surface to be destroyed by rifle fire. British naval command ordered that one of the mines be retained for later study. The last of the mines swept by the trawlers, which had been cut from its moorings by Pict, was recovered by Gemini rigid inflatable boats and towed ashore at Bluff Cove on 26 June. At Bluff Cove, it was made safe by Royal Navy experts (though the explosive was not removed) and found to be of German origin. The mine was waterproofed and loaded onto Junella's deck for return to the UK. To minimise risk of explosion while passing through the tropics, the mine was kept cool under a water-soaked mattress. Other ships were ordered to keep clear of Junella during the return journey.

Junella returned to Rosyth on 11 August, and the mine was offloaded and transferred to the Royal Naval Armaments Depot at nearby Crombie. The detonator from this mine is retained in the collection of the Imperial War Museum. Junella was subsequently converted back to civilian configuration and returned to service as a fishing vessel. In recognition of her role during the war, she was awarded the battle honour "Falkland Islands 1982".

== Post-war career ==
Junella was sold to the Royal Greenland Trading Department in 1983 and was refitted in Denmark. Afterwards, she was renamed Siku and fished for cod. She later served with other companies, being renamed Vesttraal in 1985 and Hill Cove in 1987. She returned to the name Junella after sale to SA (Fripur), a fishing company operating out of Montevideo, Uruguay. Junella suffered a major fire and was scrapped at San Antonio Oeste in Argentina on 19 July 1999.

== Bibliography ==
- Brown, David (1987). The Royal Navy and The Falklands War. London: Pen and Sword. ISBN 978-1-4738-1779-1.
- "Junella Nurses Deadly Cargo". Navy News. September 1982.
- Marine Engineers Review. Institute of Marine Engineers. 1976.
- Privratsky, Kenneth L. (2014). Logistics in the Falklands War. Barnsley, South Yorkshire: Pen and Sword Books. ISBN 978-1-47382-312-9. OCLC 890938195.
- Villar, Captain Roger (1984). Merchant Ships at War: The Falklands Experience. London: Conway Maritime Press and Lloyd's of London Press. ISBN 0851772986.
- Waterman, J. J. (1987). Freezing Fish at Sea: A History. London: H.M. Stationery Office. ISBN 978-0-11-492485-0.
- World Fishing Fleets: An Analysis of Distant-water Fleet Operations, Past, Present, Future. National Marine Fisheries Service & National Oceanic and Atmospheric Administration. 1993.
- "Marine News". Shipbuilding. 45. 1991.
