= Falklands War order of battle: British naval forces =

This is a list of the naval forces from the United Kingdom that took part in the Falklands War, often referred to as "the Task Force" in the context of the war. For a list of naval forces from Argentina, see Falklands War order of battle: Argentine naval forces.

== Royal Navy ==
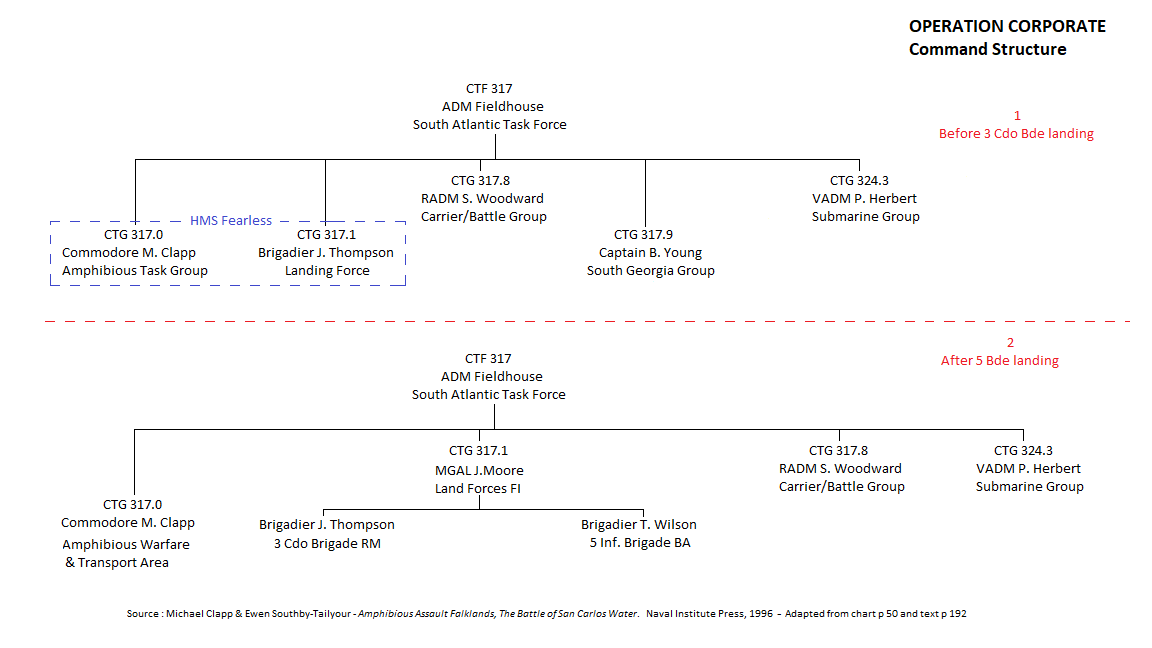
Operation Corporate command structure 1982

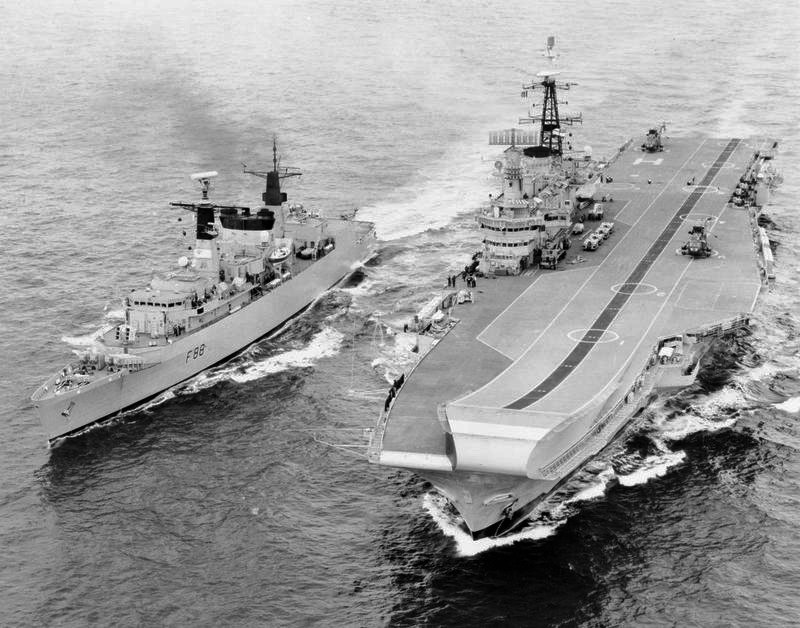
The flagship of the Carrier Group, HMS Hermes, alongside HMS Broadsword

Command

In Northwood, London:

- Commander-in-Chief, Fleet: Admiral Sir J.D.E. Fieldhouse
- Commander Task Group 324.3 and Flag Officer Submarines: Vice-Admiral P.G.M. Herbert

In the South Atlantic:

- Commander Task Group 317.8 (Carrier/Battle Group) and Flag Officer, First Flotilla: Rear-Admiral J.F. Woodward (HMS Hermes)
- Commander Task Group 317.0 (Amphibious Task Group) and Commodore Amphibious Warfare: Commodore M.C. Clapp (HMS Fearless)

Centaur-class aircraft carrier - V/STOL carrier

- HMS Hermes - Flagship Task Group 317.8 (†3) 2 SHAR pilots
  - Captain L.E. Middleton
  - 800 Naval Air Squadron (12 BAE Sea Harriers, including 7 absorbed from 899 training squadron and trials)
    - Lt Commander A.D. Auld
  - part 809 Naval Air Squadron (4 BAE Sea Harriers absorbed into 800 Squadron)
  - part No. 1 Squadron RAF (8 Hawker Siddeley Harrier GR.3)
  - 825 Naval Air Squadron (4 Sea Kings HAS.2; formed from 706 training sqn)
  - 826 Naval Air Squadron (12 Sea King HAS.5)
    - Lt Commander D.J.S. Squier
  - 846 Naval Air Squadron (6 Sea King HC.4)

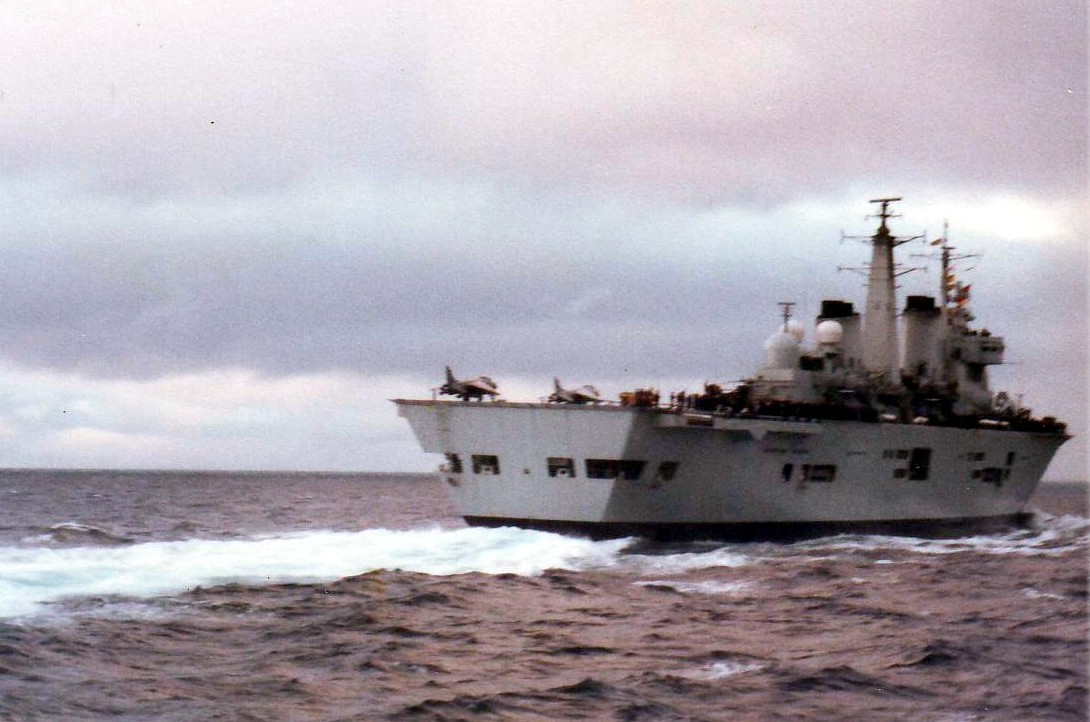
HMS Invincible in the South Atlantic.

Invincible-class aircraft carrier

- HMS Invincible (†3) 2 SHAR pilots
  - Captain J.J. Black RN
  - 801 Naval Air Squadron (8 BAE Sea Harriers including 5 absorbed from 899 training squadron))
    - Lt Commander N.D. Ward
  - part 809 Naval Air Squadron (4 BAE Sea Harriers absorbed into 801 Squadron))
  - 820 Naval Air Squadron (10 Sea King HAS.5)
    - Lt Commander R.J.S. Wykes-Sneyd

Landing platform docks

Large Foxtrot - Fearless LCU at Red Beach.

- HMS Fearless - Flagship Task Group 317.0 (†6)
  - Captain E.S.J. Larken
  - 4 LCU (Foxtrot One to Four), 100 troops or one Main Battle Tank. LCU Foxtrot Four, bombed and sunk in the Choiseul Sound by A-4B Skyhawks
  - 4 LCVP (Foxtrot Five to Eight), 25 troops or a Land Rover with trailer.
  - flight deck for 4 Sea King HC.4 (not embarked)

Large Tango - Intrepid LCU.

- HMS Intrepid
  - Captain P.G.V. Dingemans
  - 4 LCU (Tango One to Four)
  - 4 LCVP (Tango Five to Eight)
  - flight deck for 4 Sea King HC.4 (not embarked)

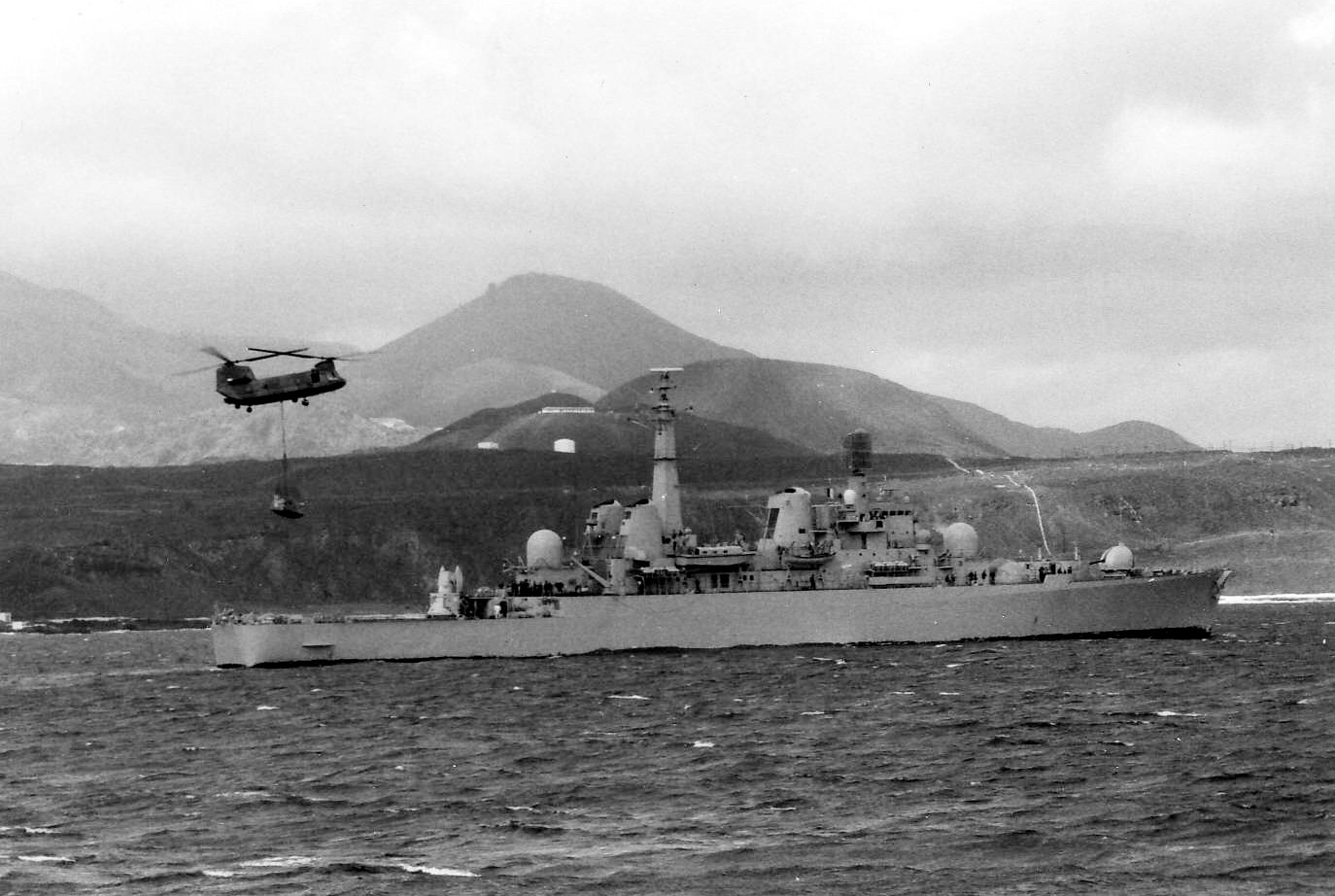
HMS Bristol

Type 82 destroyer

- HMS Bristol
  - Captain A. Grose

Type 42 destroyers

- HMS Sheffield - set on fire by an Aérospatiale AM39 Exocet (Air-to-Surface) Anti-ship missile launched from a Dassault Super Étendard 4 May, (†20) - Fatal Damage (sank on 10 May)
  - Captain J.F.T.G. Salt
- HMS Coventry - sunk on 25 May by three bombs from a Douglas A-4B Skyhawk (†19+1) - Fatal Damage
  - Captain D. Hart Dyke
- HMS Glasgow - hit by unexploded bomb from a Douglas A-4B Skyhawk 12 May, withdrawn from war - Moderate Damage
  - Captain A.P. Hoddinott
- HMS Cardiff
  - Captain M.G.T. Harris
- HMS Exeter
  - Captain H.M. Balfour

County-class destroyers

- HMS Glamorgan - hit by an Aérospatiale MM38 Exocet (surface-to-surface) anti-ship missile on 12 June (†14) - Major Damage
  - Captain M.E. Barrow
- HMS Antrim - hit by unexploded bomb from an IAI Dagger - Major Damage
  - Captain B.G. Young

Type 22 frigates

- HMS Brilliant - hit by IAI Dagger cannon fire - Minor Damage
  - Captain J.F. Coward
- HMS Broadsword - hit by IAI Dagger cannon fire, later damaged by bomb from Douglas A-4B Skyhawk - Moderate Damage
  - Captain W.R. Canning

Type 21 frigates

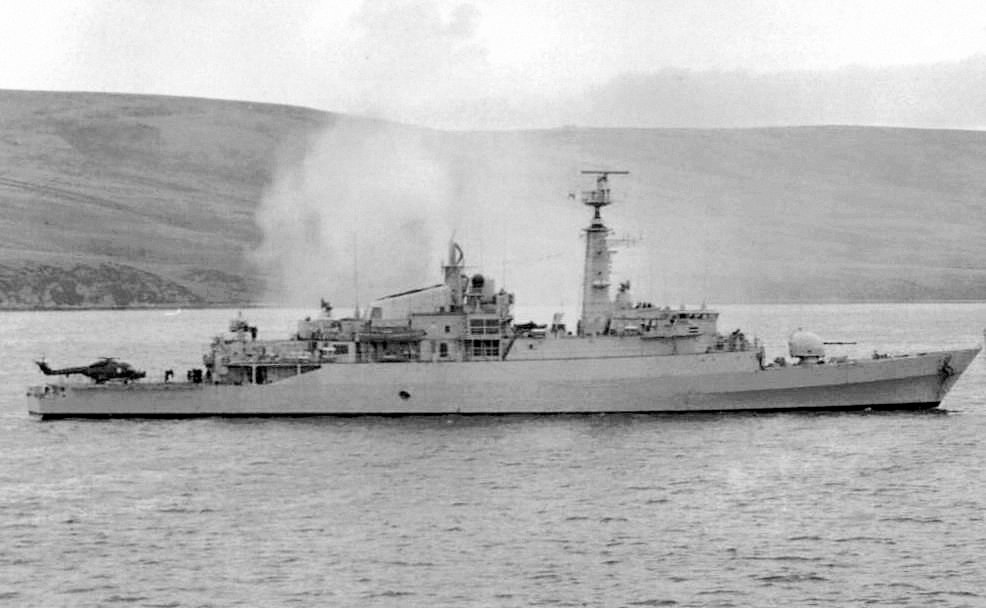
HMS Antelope returning to San Carlos, 23 May 1982

- HMS Active
  - Commander P.C.B. Canter
- HMS Alacrity - Slightly damaged by bomb. Lynx helicopter damaged by return fire from armed coaster ARA Forrest on 1 May. Sank Argentine transport ship ARA Isla de los Estados on 10 May.
  - Commander C.J.S. Craig
- HMS Antelope - sank 24 May after an unsuccessful attempt to defuse unexploded bombs from a Douglas A-4B Skyhawks (†2) - Fatal Damage
  - Commander N.J. Tobin
- HMS Ardent - sank 21 May by bombs from IAI Daggers and Douglas A-4Q Skyhawks (†22) - Fatal Damage
  - Commander A.W.J. West
- HMS Ambuscade
  - Commander P.J. Mosse
- HMS Avenger
  - Captain H.M. White
- HMS Arrow - hit by IAI Dagger cannon fire - Minor Damage
  - Commander P.J. Bootherstone

Leander-class frigates

- HMS Andromeda
  - Captain J.L. Weatherall
- HMS Argonaut - hit by Aermacchi MB.339A cannon/rocket and unexploded bombs from Douglas A-4B Skyhawks (†2) - Major Damage
  - Captain C.H. Layman
- HMS Minerva
  - Commander S.H.G. Johnston
- HMS Penelope
  - Commander P.V. Rickard

Rothesay-class frigates

- HMS Yarmouth
  - Commander A.S. Morton
- HMS Plymouth - unexploded bombs from IAI Daggers - Major Damage
  - Captain D. Pentreath
- HMS Rhyl - Ascension Island Guardship

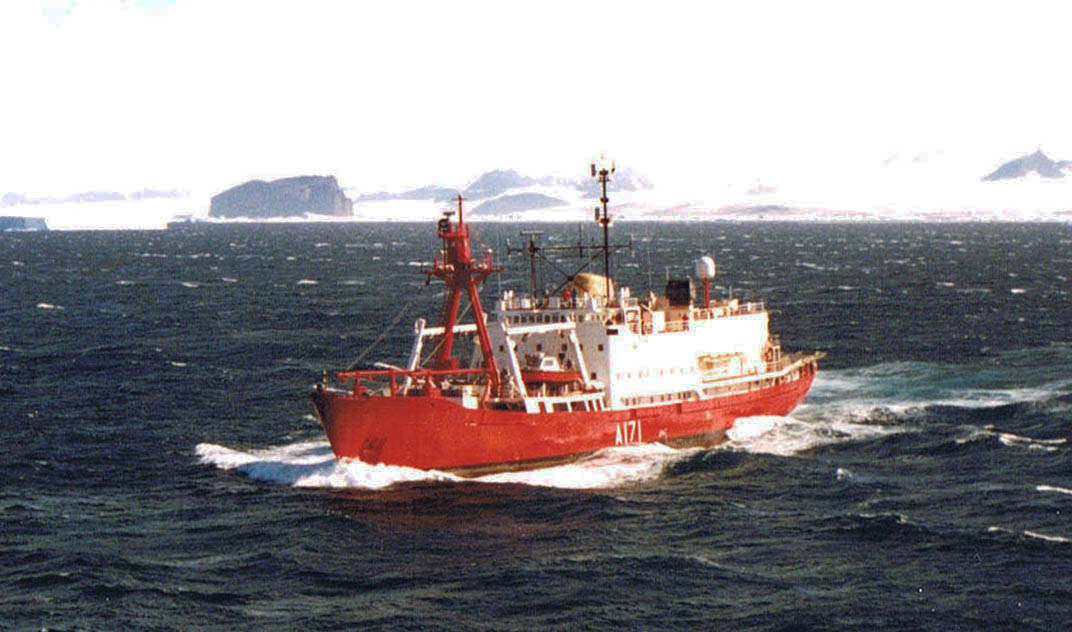
HMS Endurance

Ice patrol ship

- HMS Endurance
  - Captain N.J. Barker

Castle-class patrol vessels

As despatch vessels, carrying mail between the Task Force and Ascension Island.

- HMS Leeds Castle
  - Lt Commander C.F.B. Hamilton
- HMS Dumbarton Castle
  - Lt Commander N.D. Wood

HMS Conqueror returning to Faslane Naval Base after the war, flying the Jolly Roger to signal her sinking of ARA General Belgrano

Churchill-class submarines

- HMS Conqueror - sank ARA General Belgrano
  - Commander C.L. Wreford-Brown
- HMS Courageous
  - Commander R.T.N. Best

Oberon-class submarines

- HMS Onyx - ran aground - Moderate Damage
  - Lieutenant-Commander A. O. Johnson

Valiant-class submarines

- HMS Valiant - Argentine fighters returning from an aborted mission jettisoned bombs nearby - Minor Damage
  - Commander T.M. Le Marchand

Swiftsure-class submarines

- HMS Spartan
  - Commander J.B. Taylor
- HMS Splendid
  - Commander R.C. Lane-Nott

Hecla-class survey vessels

2,744 t, used as casualty ferries (hospital ships)

- HMS Hecla
  - Captain G.L. Hope
- HMS Herald
  - Commander R.I.C. Halliday
- HMS Hydra
  - Commander R.J. Campbell

Trawler/Minesweepers - Minesweeper Auxiliary (MSA) 11th MCM Squadron

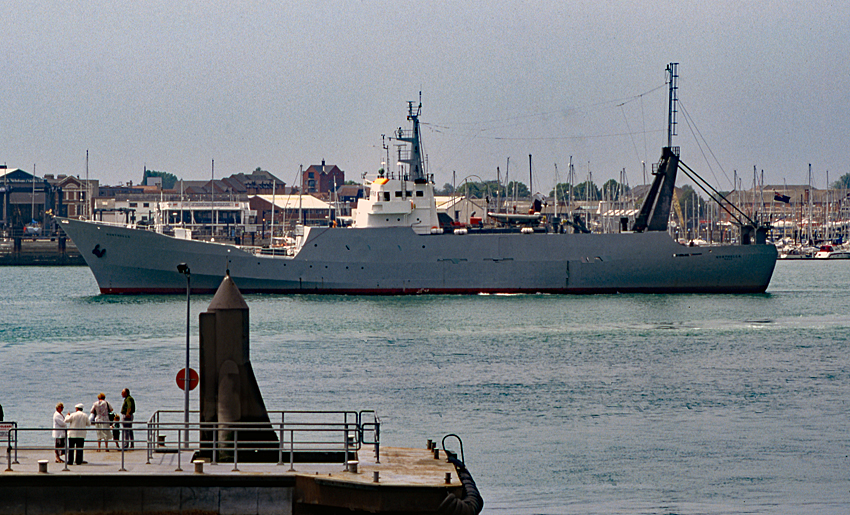
HMS Northella departing Portsmouth Harbour

Civilian trawlers converted to Extra-Deep Armed Team Sweep (EDATS) with some extempore acoustic and sonar equipment. They were crewed by Royal Naval personnel, mainly from 1st MCM Squadron based at Rosyth. All five minesweepers were involved in clearing two minefields off Port Stanley.

- HMS Cordella 1,238 GRT
  - Lieutenant-Commander M. Holloway
- HMS Farnella 1,207 GRT
  - Lieutenant R. Bishop
- HMS Junella 1,615 GRT
  - Lieutenant-Commander M. Rowledge
- HMS Northella 1,238 GRT
  - Lieutenant-Commander J. Greenop
- HMS Pict 1,478 GRT
  - Lieutenant-Commander D. Garwood

== Royal Fleet Auxiliary ==
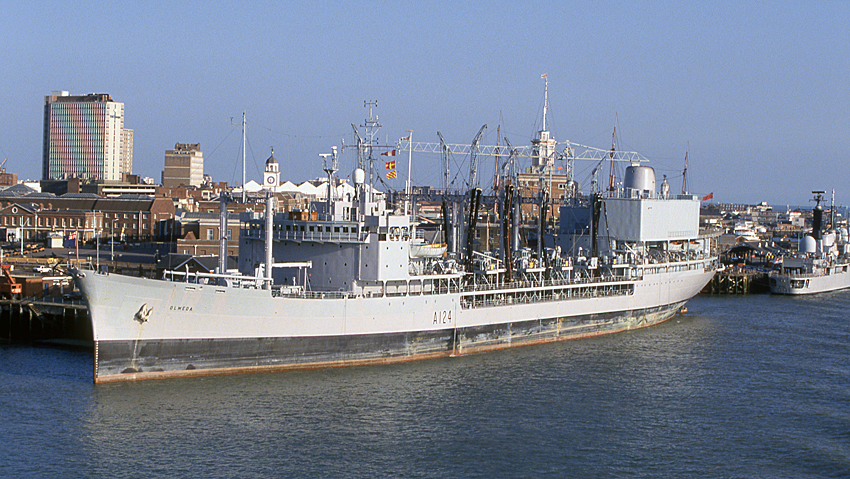
RFA Olmeda

Tankers

- RFA Olna 36,000 t
  - J.A. Bailey
- RFA Olmeda 36,000 t
  - G.P. Overbury
- RFA Tidespring 27,400 t
  - S. Redmond
- RFA Tidepool 27,400 t
  - J.W. Gaffrey
- RFA Blue Rover 11,522 t
  - D.A. Reynolds
- RFA Appleleaf 40,870 t
  - G.P.A. McDougall
- RFA Brambleleaf 40,000 t
  - M.S.J. Farley
- RFA Bayleaf 40,000 t
  - A.E.T. Hunter
- RFA Plumleaf 25,790 t
  - R.W.M. Wallace
- RFA Pearleaf 25,790 t
  - J. McCulloch

Landing Ship Logistic

The peacetime crews of the Round Table-class ships – British merchant seamen, operating under Ministry of Defence jurisdiction – were joined by British servicemen as signalmen, stevedores and gunners.

RFA Sir Lancelot. San Carlos Water.

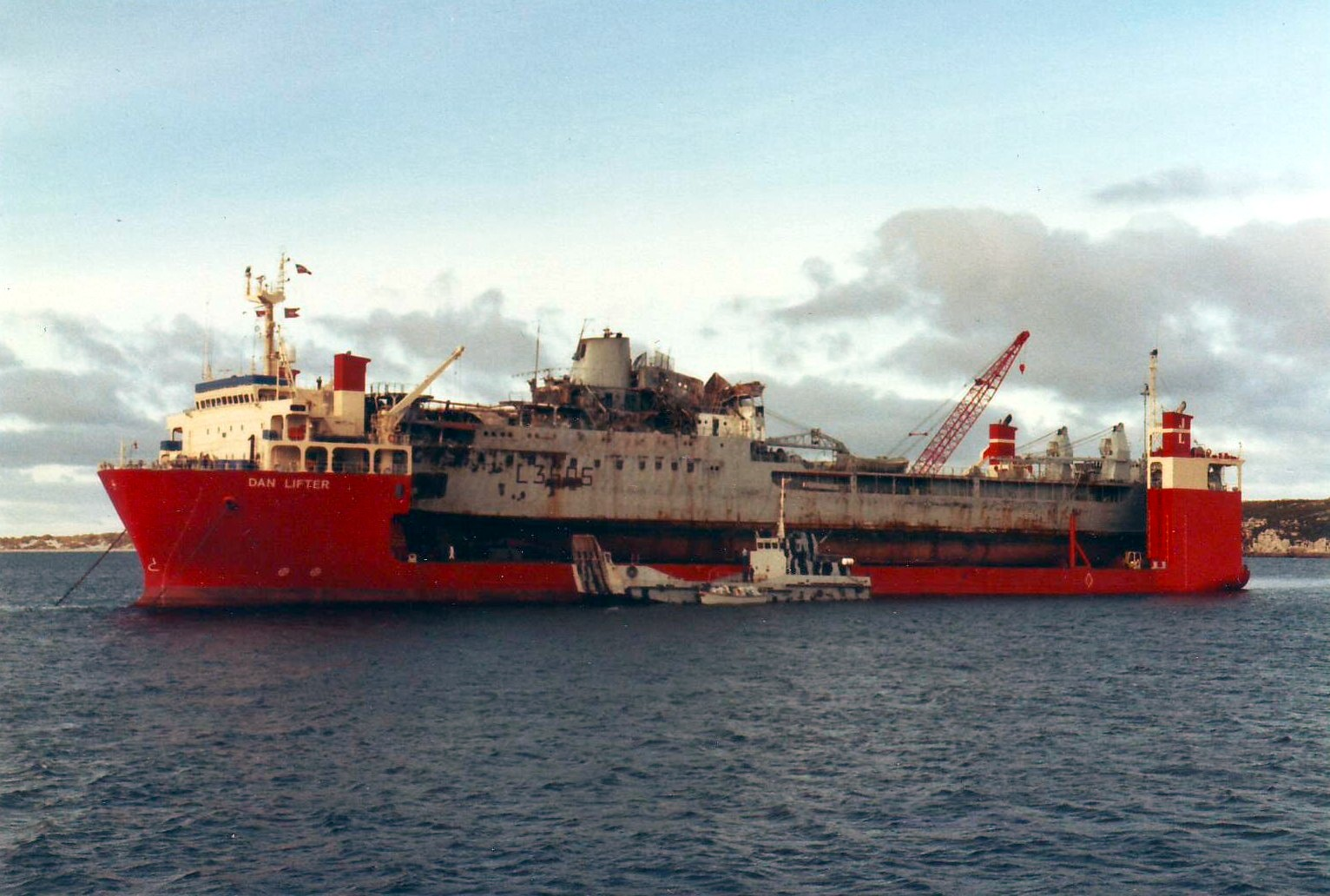
RFA Sir Tristram being carried home after the war by MV Dan Lifter

- RFA Sir Bedivere - bombed by Douglas A-4B Skyhawk - Minor Damage
  - P.J. McCarthy
- RFA Sir Galahad - bombed on 24 May and 8 June by Douglas A-4B Skyhawks (sunk by torpedo on 21 June and declared a war grave) (†48) - Fatal Damage
  - Paul J.G. Roberts
- RFA Sir Geraint
  - D.E. Lawrence
- RFA Sir Lancelot - damaged by unexploded bombs from Douglas A-4B Skyhawks
  - Christopher A. Purtcher-Wydenbruck
- RFA Sir Percivale
  - A.F. Pitt
- RFA Sir Tristram - bombed 8 June by Douglas A-4B Skyhawks (†2) - Major Damage
  - G.R. Green

Supply ships

- RFA Regent 22,890 t
  - J. Logan
- RFA Resource 22,890 t
  - B.A. Seymour
- RFA Fort Austin 23,600 t
  - Commodore Sam Dunlop RFA (S C Dunlop)
- RFA Fort Grange 23,600 t
  - D.G.M. Averill
- RFA Stromness 16,792 t - attacked by A-4C on 24 May - Minor Damage
  - J.B. Dickinson

Helicopter support ship

- RFA Engadine 9,000 t
  - D.F. Freeman

== Royal Maritime Auxiliary Service ==
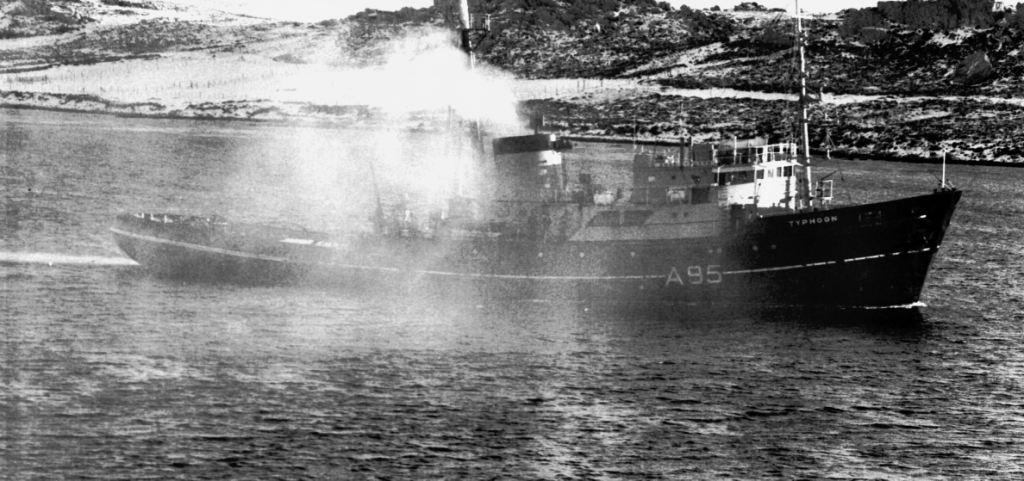
RMAS Typhoon off Stanley.

- RMAS Typhoon (A95)
- RMAS Goosander (A94)

== Ships taken up from trade ==
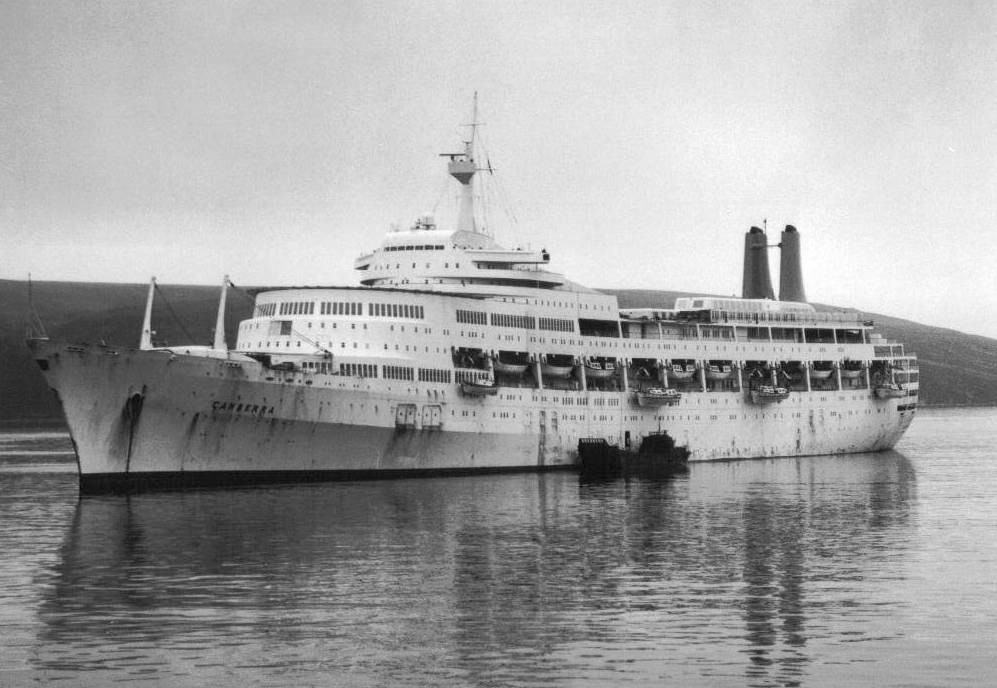
Canberra in San Carlos Water. May 1982

The following Merchant Navy ships were requisitioned, as Ships Taken Up From Trade (STUFT).

Liners

- Canberra 44,807 GRT – equipped with helicopter pad and carried personnel of 3 Commando Brigade to San Carlos on 21 May.
- Queen Elizabeth 2. 67,140 GRT – equipped with helicopter pad and carried 3,200 men of 5 Infantry Brigade. At South Georgia, the men of 2nd Battalion, Scots Guards, 1st Battalion, Welsh Guards and 1st Battalion, 7th Duke of Edinburgh's Own Gurkha Rifles were transferred to Canberra, Norland and RFA Stromness on 27 May for transport to San Carlos.
- Uganda 16,907 GRT – equipped with helicopter pad and used as hospital ship from 11 May.

Roll-on-Roll-off ferries

- Elk 5,463 GRT – equipped with helicopter pad and two Bofors 40 mm guns to carry three Sea King helicopters, ammunition, and heavy vehicles including eight Bofors 40 mm guns, four FV101 Scorpion and four FV107 Scimitar light tanks - joined carrier battle group on 16 May
- Baltic Ferry 6,455 GRT – equipped with helicopter pad and carried three Army helicopters, 105 troops, and 1,874 tons of stores and ammunition to Ajax Bay on 1 June
- Europic Ferry 4,190 GRT – equipped with helicopter pad and carried vehicles, ammunition, fuel, and four Scout helicopters of 656 Squadron Army Air Corps to San Carlos on 21 May
- Nordic Ferry 6,455 GRT – equipped with helicopter pad and carried troops, stores, and ammunition to Falklands on 29 May
- Norland 12,990 GRT – equipped with helicopter pad carried 800 men of 2nd Battalion, Parachute Regiment and men of 848 Naval Air Squadron to San Carlos on 21 May
- Rangatira 9,387 GRT – equipped with helicopter pad and Oerlikon 20 mm cannon to carry 1,000 engineers with vehicles and equipment, but sailed after cease fire.
- St Edmund 8,987 GRT – equipped with helicopter pad and carried RAF crews (18 Sqn), troops and vehicles
- Tor Caledonia 5,056 GRT – equipped with helicopter pad and carried vehicles and equipment; arrived 12 June

Container / Cargo ships

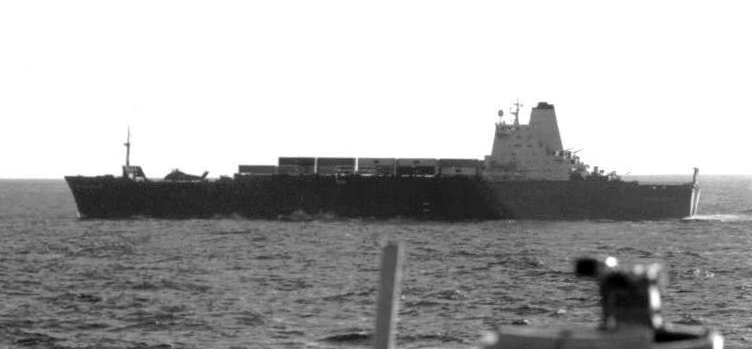
Atlantic Conveyor approaching the Falklands

- Astronomer 27,867 GRT – equipped with helicopter pad and Oerlikon 20 mm cannon and carried thirteen helicopters; arrived after cease fire.
- Atlantic Conveyor 14,946 GRT – equipped with helicopter pad and carried eight BAE Sea Harriers (809 Squadron - aircraft later transferred to the two carriers), six Hawker Siddeley Harriers, six Westland Wessex helicopters, and four CH-47 Chinook helicopters (18 Squadron RAF); arrived 19 May - hit 25 May by one or two Aérospatiale AM39 Exocet air-to-surface anti-ship missile(s) launched from a Dassault Super Étendard (†12) - Fatal Damage: Sank in tow 28 May - 6 embarked Wessex HU.5 helicopters, 3 embarked Chinook HC.1 helicopters, 1 embarked Sea Lynx HAS.2, heavy equipment intended for airfield construction, and the bulk stock of tents intended for infantry shelter ashore were lost
- Atlantic Causeway 14,946 GRT – equipped with helicopter pad and carried eight ASW Sea Kings and twenty Westland Wessex helicopters; arrived 27 May.
- Contender Bezant 11,445 GRT – equipped with helicopter pad and carried 9 Wasp helicopters, 4 Harriers and 3 Chinooks; arrived after cease fire. - purchased as RFA Argus post-war
- Myrmidon 23,413 GRT-equipped with tented accommodation and Portakabins armed with 20 mm Oerlikon cannons, arrived after ceasefire

Freighters

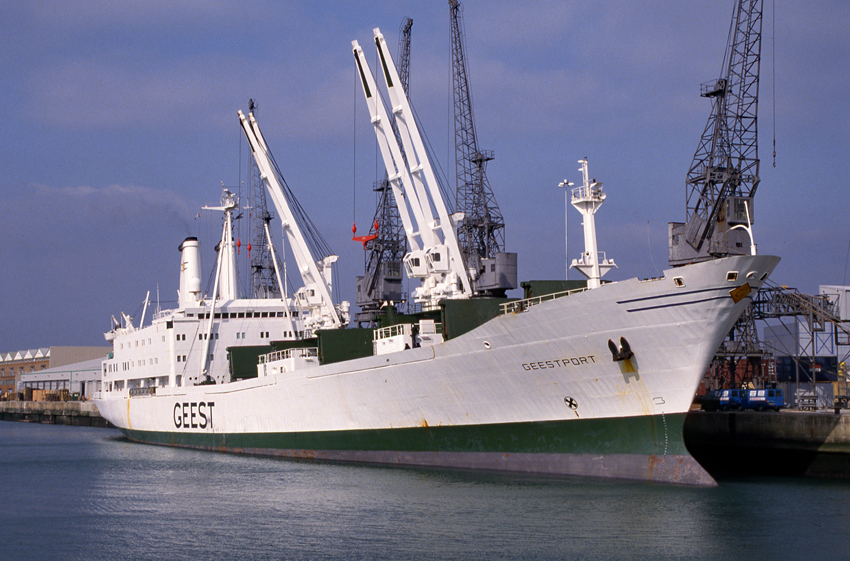
Geestport, refrigerated ship, in Southampton Docks

- Avelona Star 9784 GRT (refrigerated) – equipped with helicopter pad and carried provisions; arrived after cease fire
- Geestport 7,730 GRT (refrigerated) – equipped with helicopter pad and carried provisions and stores; arrived 11 June
- Laertes 11,804 GRT – Soviet-built with armored cable trunks and damage control centers - carried general supplies; arrived after cease fire
- Lycaon 11,804 GRT – Soviet-built with armored cable trunks and damage control centers - carried ammunition and supplies; arrived 28 May
- Saxonia 8,547 GRT (refrigerated) – carried provisions; arrived 23 May
- Strathewe 12,598 GRT – carried supplies and landing craft; arrived after cease fire
- St Helena 3,150 GRT – equipped with helicopter pad and four Oerlikon 20 mm cannon for use as minesweeper support ship after the cease fire

Tankers

- Alvega 33,000 t (57,372 DWT) – used as base storage tanker at Ascension from mid-May
- Anco Charger 24,500 DWT – used as auxiliary support tanker from 24 April with capability to transport 42 different liquids at once
- Balder London 19,980 t (33,751 DWT) – used as auxiliary support tanker from 12 May
- British Avon 15,640 t (25,620 DWT) – used as auxiliary support tanker from 25 April
- British Dart 15,650 t (28,488 DWT) – used as auxiliary support tanker from 22 April
- British Esk 15,643 t (25,905 DWT) – fitted with over-the-stern underway refueling equipment for use as the first convoy escort oiler
- British Tamar 15,646 t (25,498 DWT) – fitted with over-the-stern underway refueling equipment for use as convoy escort oiler from 13 April
- British Tay 15,650 t (25,650 DWT) – used as auxiliary support tanker from 12 April
- British Test 16,653 t (25,641 DWT) – used as auxiliary support tanker from 14 April
- British Trent 15,649 t (25,147 DWT) – used as auxiliary support tanker from 18 April
- British Wye 15,649 t (25,197 DWT) – used as auxiliary support tanker from 25 April - hit by bomb from Lockheed C-130 Hercules - Minor Damage
- Eburna 19,763 t (31,374 DWT) – used as auxiliary support tanker from 26 April
- Fort Toronto 25,498 DWT – fresh water tanker from 19 April
- G.A.Walker 18,744 t (30,607 DWT) – used as auxiliary tanker from 10 June
- Scottish Eagle 33,000 t (54,490 DWT) – used as base storage tanker at South Georgia from 18 June and then moved to Falklands on 14 July

Tugs / Repair / Support Ships

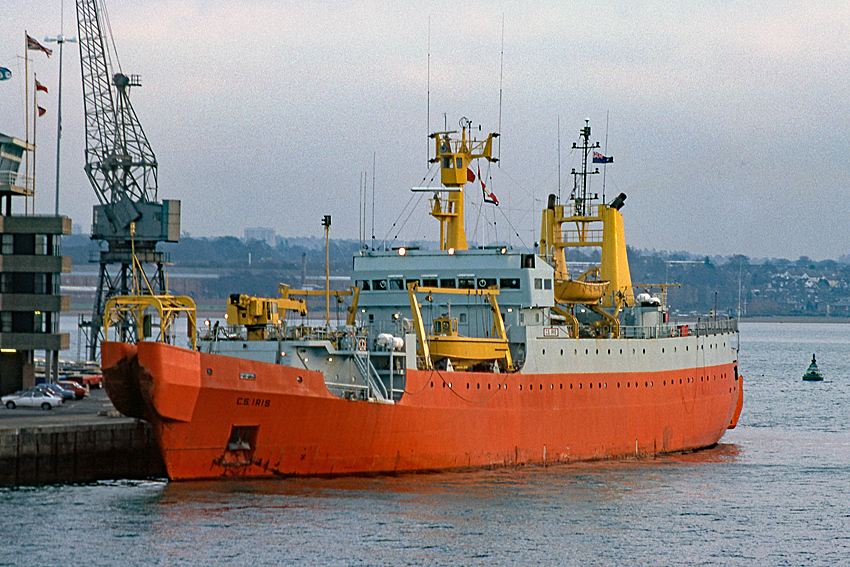
Cable ship Iris

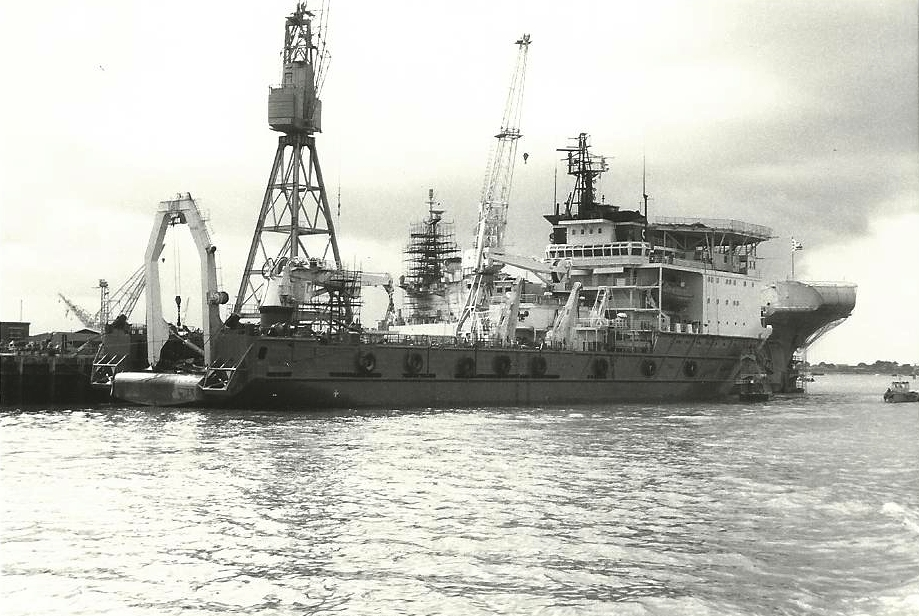
MV Stena Seaspread

- British Enterprise III 1,595 t – diving support ship
- Iris 3,873 GRT – cable ship equipped with helicopter pad and two Oerlikon 20 mm cannon for use as despatch vessel from late May.
- Irishman 686 GRT – ocean salvage tug from 24 May.
- Salvageman 1,598 GRT – ocean salvage tug from 7 May.(the most powerful tug on British registry with 11,000 brake horsepower and 170 ton bollard pull)
- Stena Inspector 5,814 GRT – equipped with helicopter pad and used as repair ship after the cease fire. - purchased as RFA Diligence post-war
- Stena Seaspread 6,061 GRT – diving vessel, oilfield support ship equipped with helicopter pad and used as repair ship from 16 May. "Quote": Supreme effort to prepare fleet for battle: Not for the first time has the versatility and technological capability of the offshore support fleet astounded the military - it only comes as a surprise to those not familiar with the offshore oil industry and the demands it places on ships and those crewing them, that the navies of the world do not have the same level of technology available and their personnel often lack the same levels of skills and experience. Most noteworthy was the MSV Stena Seaspread, a refitted diving and maintenance vessel which was taken to the Falklands to act as a floating workshop for the warships. During the period of hostilities the MSV Stena Seaspread carried out damage and other repairs in mid-ocean to more than 50 ships, including 10 warships and 4 captured vessels.
- Wimpey Seahorse 1,599 GRT – oilfield supply vessel used as mooring tender and tug from 8 June.
- Yorkshireman 686 GRT – ocean salvage tug from 24 May.

== Weaponry ==
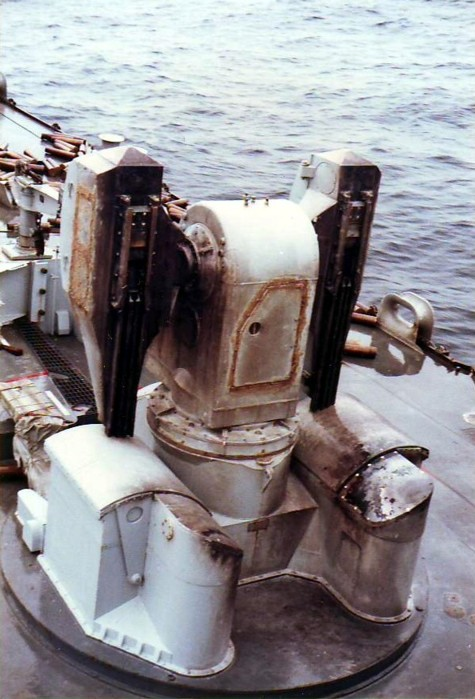
HMS Cardiff Sea Dart Launcher.

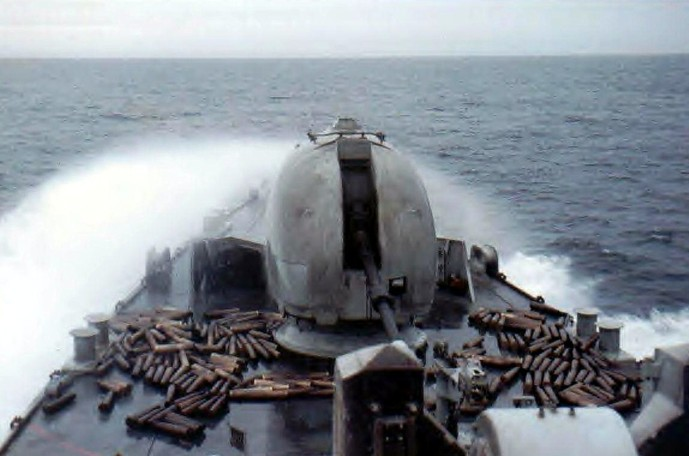
Type 42 destroyer returning from a nightly shelling

- Surface-to-air missiles
  - Sea Slug
  - Sea Cat
  - Sea Wolf
  - Sea Dart
- Surface-to-surface missiles
  - Aérospatiale MM38 Exocet (Anti-ship missile)
  - Ikara (Anti-submarine missile)
- Artillery
  - 4.5 inch (114 mm) L/55 Mark 8 gun
  - 4.5 inch (114 mm) L/45 Mark 6 gun
  - Bofors 40 mm L/60 Mark 9 anti-aircraft (A/A) gun
  - Oerlikon 20 mm A/A gun
  - L7A2 7.62 mm GPMG General purpose machine gun
  - Limbo Mark 10 anti-submarine mortar
- Torpedoes
  - Mark 24 Tigerfish torpedo
  - Mark 8 torpedo

== See also ==
- Falklands War order of battle: British ground forces
- Falklands War order of battle: British air forces
