= 11th Mine Countermeasures Squadron =

- Active: April–August 1982
- Country: United Kingdom
- Branch: Royal Navy
- Role: Mine countermeasures
- Ships: HMS Cordella; HMS Farnella; HMS Junella; HMS Northella; HMS Pict
- Engagements: Falklands War

Commanders
- Commander: Lt-Cdr Martyn Holloway

The 11th Mine Countermeasures Squadron was a unit of the British Royal Navy during the Falklands War of 1982.

== Unit history ==
=== Background ===
On 2 April 1982, Argentina invaded the Falkland Islands. Intelligence from a submarine reported the laying of a defensive minefield off the approaches to Port Stanley (the capital of the islands). Great Britain had supplied Argentina with modern influence mines, both combination magnetic and pressure activated, and had recently actually serviced them for the Argentinian Navy. The Royal Navy's mine warfare capacity was purely coastal with 425-long-ton (432 t) Ton-class minesweepers with a range of around 2,300 nmi (2,600 mi; 4,300 km), totally unsuitable for either the distance or the conditions.

A plan existed from the Cold War years for the sweeping of Soviet minefields in the English Channel and North Sea, in the event of needing to reinforce Europe in time of war with Russia. It revolved around a number of deep sea trawlers (approx 1,450 long tons (1,470 t)) being earmarked and kept in "readiness" for conversion. Five ships were called to Rosyth dockyard where in three days they were stripped of their fishing equipment, their holds were emptied of frozen fish, and Extremely Deep Armed Team Sweep (EDATS) equipment was fitted. They were hastily commissioned, and crews, mainly from the Rosyth-based 1st MCM Squadron were assembled, bolstered by technical specialists from elsewhere. The group was designated the 11th MCM Squadron under the command of Lieutenant-Commander Martyn Holloway, the captain of HMS Cordella.

The plan was based on the assumption that the Argentinians would have surrendered by the time they got there, and the sweepers would simply clear the minefields. They were unarmed except for two light machine guns on the bridge wings, with a single engine, single screw configuration, only two or three watertight compartments, and were inherently difficult to handle.

=== Training and preparation ===
After a two-day work-up, basic drills on operating unfamiliar equipment were carried out with instruction from the merchant service crews, who then disembarked. Four of the ships sailed on 25 April and HMS Pict followed the next day, to catch them up en route. Drills were practised with the mainly unfamiliar EDATS in the waters off North Africa. As the weather warmed, the daily task of locating discarded fish around the ships became more important, the stench often leading to fish that had slid under equipment before decaying. On 11 May, the squadron anchored off Ascension Island, and refuelled, although the ships had the capacity to travel the 7,600 nmi (14,100 km) to the operational area and return to the UK on one tank.

The ships were then ordered to sail for South Georgia on the 13th, arriving on 25 May. They were used there as utility vessels, transporting stores and men, particularly Gurkhas, Scots and Welsh Guards between the ships they had made the journey down on, to the generally smaller craft which would take them to the landing, often in appalling conditions of force 10 katabatic winds and driving snow.

They were then ordered on 5 June to sail to the edge of the Total Exclusion Zone (TEZ) which was in theory outside the range of land-based aircraft. After the landings, the squadron sailed into and anchored in "bomb alley" in San Carlos Water on 9 June.

=== The war zone ===
The Argentines had not surrendered, so these ships were then used at night to transport Special Forces, such as SAS and Royal Marines, mainly into West Falkland, where they were inserted covertly by Gemini RHIB. They had to be back inside the Rapier (air defence missile system) protection of San Carlos or Teal Inlet by dawn as they were defenceless to air attack in the open sea. This was a hazardous undertaking, operating in confined and shallow waters with photocopies of hand drawn charts from the 1920s in many cases. On one occasion, HMS Pict was dropping troops at Saunders Island with an onshore force 7 and struck a reef just as the Geminis were slipped down the rear trawlnet chute. Luckily the ship came off with no more than a large dent in the bottom. On the night of 11 June, HMS Pict was ordered to sweep the entry to Berkeley Sound and mark a cleared channel for a frigate to enter and shell with fire support (NGFS), the Argentinian mountain positions guarding Port Stanley for the final infantry assault. The five ships were utilised as general workhorses, often in circumstances where their potential loss was viewed as a good alternative to a major fleet unit.

The Argentinian forces in the Falklands surrendered on 14 June, and the ships were ordered to proceed as soon as possible to Port Stanley and clear the immediate approach to the harbour. After entering port, there followed several days of uncertainty as to whether or not the forces on the Argentine mainland would carry on the fight. Minesweeping, especially in EDATS, leaves a minesweeper extremely vulnerable to air attack. Whilst in harbour, the MCD specialists in the squadron had set up a Trisponder network, which allows navigational accuracy to 8 m (8.7 yd) in the Port Stanley approaches. Two Argentinian officers presented a chart showing the locations that 21 mines were laid, in two fields with a defined channel between them. The more sophisticated influence mines had apparently been utilised in a defensive pattern off Buenos Aires, in case of a British attack on the mainland, and very simple contact moored mines were laid in the Falklands.

It was eventually judged safe on 22 June to commence the clearance operations. Initially using the safer but less sure Oropesa system, the squadron swept 11 of the mines. Bad weather—up to force 12 on occasions—seemed to have moved the rest out of position. The very accurate EDATS system was then used to ensure full clearance. The operation was completed on 5 July. On the 13th, the squadron was released for a return to the UK via Gibraltar, a total distance of 7,540 nmi (8,680 mi; 13,960 km), arriving in mid-August, when the individual ships were returned to their owners.
