= Sir Tony Wilson, 6th Baronet =

British Army officer (1935–2019)

Brigadier Sir Tony Wilson Bt OBE MC

Personal details
- Born: Mathew John Anthony Wilson; 2 October 1935
- Died: 5 December 2019 (aged 84)
- Spouse: Janet Mary Mowll (m. 1962)
- Children: Mathew Edward Amcotts Wilson; Victoria Mary Wilson
- Awards: Officer of the Order of the British Empire; Military Cross

Military service
- Allegiance: United Kingdom
- Branch/service: British Army
- Years of service: 1956–1983
- Rank: Brigadier
- Commands: 5th Infantry Brigade
- Battles/wars: • Aden Emergency • Indonesia–Malaysia confrontation • Operation Banner • Falklands War

Brigadier Sir Mathew John Anthony Wilson, 6th Baronet, OBE, MC (2 October 1935 – 5 December 2019) was a British Army officer who commanded the 5th Infantry Brigade during the Falklands War.

== Early life ==
Mathew John Anthony Wilson was born 2 October 1935 and was the son of Anthony Thomas Wilson, and Margaret Holden. His paternal grandparents were Lt. Col. Sir Mathew Richard Henry Wilson, 4th Baronet of Eshton Hall and the Hon. Barbara Lister, daughter of Thomas Lister, 4th Baron Ribblesdale.

Educated at the Royal Military Academy Sandhurst, Wilson was commissioned into the King's Own Yorkshire Light Infantry (KOYLI) on his 21st birthday on 2 October 1956, and thus represented the fourth consecutive generation of his family to serve with the regiment. Over the next few years he took part in military operations in Aden, Borneo, Malaya, Cyprus and Northern Ireland.

== Career ==
In 1967 he was promoted to major and was appointed a Member of the Order of the British Empire in 1971. Shortly afterwards, in May 1972, he received the Military Cross "for Gallant Services" in Northern Ireland. Promotion to lieutenant colonel followed in 1973 and after a further engagement in Northern Ireland and a posting to Hong Kong, in 1979 he was advanced to Officer of the Order of the British Empire.

=== Falklands War ===
With his promotion to colonel he moved to the General Staff of the Ministry of Defence in London, and on 31 December 1980 he was promoted to brigadier assuming command of the 5th Infantry Brigade, which he was to lead during the Falklands War.

Wilson commanded the 5th Infantry Brigade during the campaign to liberate the Falkland Islands after their seizure by the Argentinians, and was responsible for the southern flank of British forces on East Falkland, in their advance towards the Islands' capital, Stanley. First, Wilson was able to secure a large part of the eastern island, with the so-called "bold move" but, during the further advance, an Argentine air attack on two landing ships, Sir Galahad and Sir Tristram, occurred at Port Pleasant (sometimes also called Fitzroy or Bluff Cove) at noon on 8 June 1982. 46 British soldiers and 3 Asian crew members were killed, and 115 men suffered severe burns. It was the largest single loss of men on the British side in this war. Several TV crews were on site during the attack and the resulting footage was shown on TV news bulletins later that same day. At the conclusion of the conflict, Wilson was the only senior British officer who failed to receive any honours in recognition of his service. Whether this was as a consequence of the attack is not known.

On 27 March 2022 Channel 4 broadcast the TV documentary "Falklands War: The Untold Story" with the strap-line "On the 40th anniversary of the conflict, senior commanders and ground troops reveal how a series of mistakes nearly cost Britain its hard-won victory over Argentina in the South Atlantic". The programme featured criticism of Wilson. It was stated that he had almost been sacked for poor and indecisive performance on a training exercise in the UK prior to deployment, and that Dwin Bramall, then Chief of the General Staff, later described the decision to retain him in command as one of the worst he had made in over forty years as a soldier. One interviewee described Wilson as a “bloody idiot” presiding over a “bloody shambles”. Julian Thompson recounted how when Wilson proposed that his brigade should walk to Fitzroy, Major John Crosland (2 Para) had replied "Brigadier, are you pissed?". Thompson further stated that "I perceive that Tony was engaged in some sort of race with 3 Commando Brigade to get his chaps there first. The thing about military setups is, everyone thinks about their own side, even people on your own side who aren't part of you are the enemy".

=== Later career ===
On 31 December 1982, a little over six months after the end of the war, Wilson stepped down from all his military posts. He retired from the Army on 31 January 1983 at age 47. Shortly after, he emigrated to the United States with his wife and largely retreated from public view.

Wilson turned to publishing travel books under his name Mathew Wilson (see Literature section below). From 1983 to 1985 Wilson was managing director of Wilderness Foundation UK, a nonprofit organization that provides the opportunity to its seminar participants to experience nature and wilderness.

== Personal life ==
He was married to Janet Mary Mowll and was the father of a son and a daughter. He and his wife lived in the United States.

Wilson died on 5 December 2019.

== Literature ==
Wilson published the following books on travelling and sailing:

- Taking Terrapin Home: A Love Affair with a Small Catamaran, 1994, ISBN 978-0-93983-724-3
- The Bahamas Cruising Guide with the Turks and Caicos Islands, 1997, ISBN 978-0-96592-586-0
- The Land of War Elephants: Travels Beyond the Pale Afghanistan, Pakistan, and India, 2003, ISBN 978-0-96592-589-1
- Seeking Havens: Travels Along a Line of Latitude 17 Degrees South in Andean Peru, Bolivia, and the South Pacific, 2006, ISBN 978-1-42597-776-4

Wilson wrote a memoir of the Falklands War, but the publisher he submitted it to (Leo Cooper Ltd) turned it down. Wilson's time in the Falklands War was covered in a self-published military history book:

- The Lonesome Commander, Martin Mahle, Monsenstein und Vannerdat Münster, Germany, 2012, ISBN 978-3-86991-663-7 (original German title: Der allein gelassene Kommandeur, ISBN 978-3-86991-664-4)

Baronetage of the United Kingdom
Preceded by Mathew Martin Wilson	Baronet (of Eshton Hall); 1991–2019	Succeeded by Mathew Edward Amcotts Wilson
