= HMS Cordella =

History

United Kingdom
- Name: HMS Cordella
- Builder: Clelands Shipbuilding Company, Wallsend
- Acquired: by STUFT, April 1982
- Commissioned: April 1982
- Decommissioned: August 1982
- Fate: Returned to owners, August 1982; Sunk, 2005

General characteristics
- Type: Mine countermeasures vessel
- Tonnage: 1,238 tons

Service record
- Commanders: Lt Cdr M.C.G. Holloway
- Operations: Falklands War

HMS Cordella was a Royal Navy auxiliary mine countermeasures vessel that served during the Falklands War as part of 11th MCM Squadron.

== Service history ==
F/V Cordella was a 1,238 ton fishing trawler built in 1973 by Clelands Shipbuilding Company at Wallsend, England.

Cordella was one of five Hull-based trawlers that were taken up from trade by the Royal Navy in 1982 for service as naval trawlers (auxiliary MCM vessels) during the Falklands War. The trawlers were fitted with Oropesa towed minesweeping equipment and Extra Deep Armed Team Sweep (EDATS) equipment at HMNB Rosyth and crewed by Royal Navy personnel prior to operational deployment.

During night of 10 June 1982, Cordella supported her sister ship HMS Pict while the latter influence swept Berkeley Sound. No mines were found thus reducing the risk to ships engaging in naval bombardment of Argentine positions.

During nights of 12, 13, and 14 June, she conducted covert operations resupplying SAS and SBS patrols deployed variously along the coast. Following the Argentine surrender Cordella and the other four ships of the 11 MCM cleared the minefields off Port Stanley.

== Post-war ==
After the war she returned to the United Kingdom and returned to her peacetime role as a fishing vessel.

She returned to the Falkland Islands in the early 1990s and was used as a Fishery Protection vessel under charter to the Falkland Islands Government, occasionally making trips to patrol South Georgia waters too.

In 2000 Cordella was sold to a Latvian owner as F/V Olga. Renamed as F/V Gideon, she was lost off Newfoundland in 2005.

== See also ==
- 11th MCM Squadron
- British naval forces in the Falklands War
