= Bluff Cove air attacks =

1982 aerial operation of the Falklands War

- Part of Falklands War
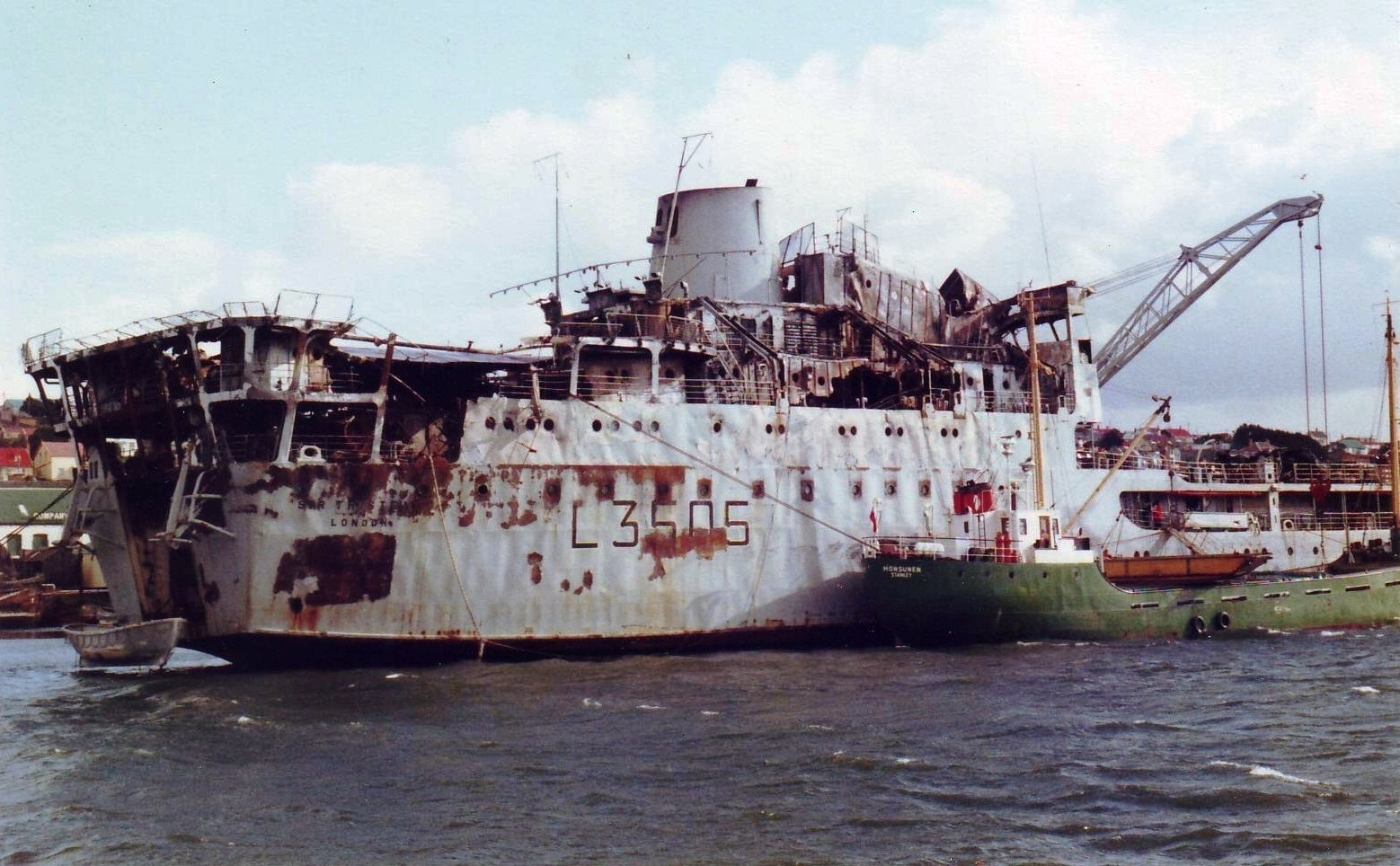
- RFA Sir Tristram after the Argentine air attack
Date	8 June 1982
Location	Port Pleasant; Falkland Islands 51°47′57″S 58°13′08″W
Result	Argentine victory: British ground attack on Stanley delayed by two days

Belligerents
United Kingdom	Argentina

Commanders and leaders
(United Kingdom) Jeremy Moore (United Kingdom) Michael Clapp (United Kingdom) Julian Thompson (United Kingdom) Tony Wilson	(Argentina) Ernesto Crespo (Argentina) Mario Menendez (Argentina) Juan Lombardo

Casualties and losses
56 killed 150 wounded 1 landing ship scuttled 1 LCU sunk 1 helicopter written off 1 landing ship badly damaged 1 frigate damaged	3 killed 3 aircraft lost
- Location within Falkland Islands

On 8 June 1982, during the Falklands War, British troop transport ships were bombed by Argentine Air Force (FAA) Douglas A-4 Skyhawk fighter bombers at Port Pleasant, off Fitzroy, while transferring troops to Bluff Cove, killing 56 British servicemen and wounding more than 150.

== Background ==
By 1 June, British forces on the Falkland Islands were bolstered by the arrival of 5,000 new troops of the 5th Infantry Brigade. Major General Jeremy Moore now had sufficient force to start planning a full-scale assault on Port Stanley.

Advance parties of the 2nd Battalion, Parachute Regiment moved forward and occupied Fitzroy and Bluff Cove, when it was discovered to be clear of Argentine forces. The 1st Battalion, Welsh Guards and 2nd Battalion, Scots Guards were to be sent in from San Carlos Water to support them. After the sinking of the transport Atlantic Conveyor there was only one British heavy-lift helicopter available, an RAF CH-47 Chinook, Bravo November. Therefore, supplies and reinforcements would have to be transported by ships of the Royal Fleet Auxiliary, which were crewed by civilian sailors.

The Scots Guards arrived according to schedule on board Landing Craft Utility (LCU) boats, but the Welsh Guards transference was held off because only two LCUs were available, and heavy equipment was given priority over troops. Since ferrying them from San Carlos on HMS Intrepid or HMS Fearless was not an option as this should have demanded a strong escort, the only alternative was to transport the regiment aboard RFA Sir Galahad and RFA Sir Tristam, two large Landing Ship Logistic (LSL) amphibious vessels. The amphibious ships' first stopover would be Fitzroy, where a field hospital and Rapier anti-aircraft missile batteries would be landed, and then the ships would head to Bluff Cove to land the guards before dawn. It took six hours to load the equipment, which led Sir Galahad's captain to request permission to postpone the mission for the following night, but the only concession he was given was to debark the Welsh Guards at Fitzroy, before daylight made direct landing at Bluff Cove too risky. Once at destination, the troops faced two options; either marching the 12 miles to Bluff Cove on foot or wait until being put on board one of the LCUs, now at the ready. It was eventually decided to ferry the regiment by sea.

== Air strikes ==
On 8 June, with the transfer of troops to the LCU at Fitzroy still underway, the British ships became the target of two waves of Douglas A-4 Skyhawk attack aircraft from the Argentine Air Force's 5th Air Brigade, each of them loaded with three 500 lb retarded-tail bombs of Spanish design. The airstrikes had been called in by Argentine commandos of 602 Commando Company after they spotted the ships from their position on Mount Harriet. The fighters departed from Río Gallegos airbase, which at the time was monitored by the British nuclear submarine HMS Splendid. The first wave of attack, originally made of eight aircraft, was reduced to five when three Skyhawks returned to base due to refuelling problems. On their way to Bluff Cove, the formation overflew a Scout helicopter from 656 Squadron AAC; the Scout, XR628, was forced to make a hard landing on McPhee Pond after experiencing mechanical failure while taking evasive action. The aircraft was eventually written off. The helicopter was identified as a Lynx by the package leader, First Lieutenant Carlos Cachón.

Six Argentine IAI Dagger fighters simultaneously took off from the airbase at Río Grande for a complementary mission, led by a Learjet which provided navigation information. One of the Daggers subsequently returned to base due to refuelling issues. The attacking aircraft were preceded by four IAI Dagger fighters which took off from Río Grande airbase to carry out a decoy mission over the north of the islands in order to draw away the British Sea Harrier fighters and allow the Skyhawks and Daggers to carry out their attacks unmolested, while the Argentine destroyer ARA Santísima Trinidad broadcast interference signals to jam the frequencies used by the Royal Navy's air controllers directing Sea Harrier operations. The nuclear submarine HMS Valiant, on picket duty off Río Grande, was able to track the six Dagger fighters that took off from the airbase there, but the report from the submarine failed to reach the British forces at Bluff Cove.

=== First strike ===
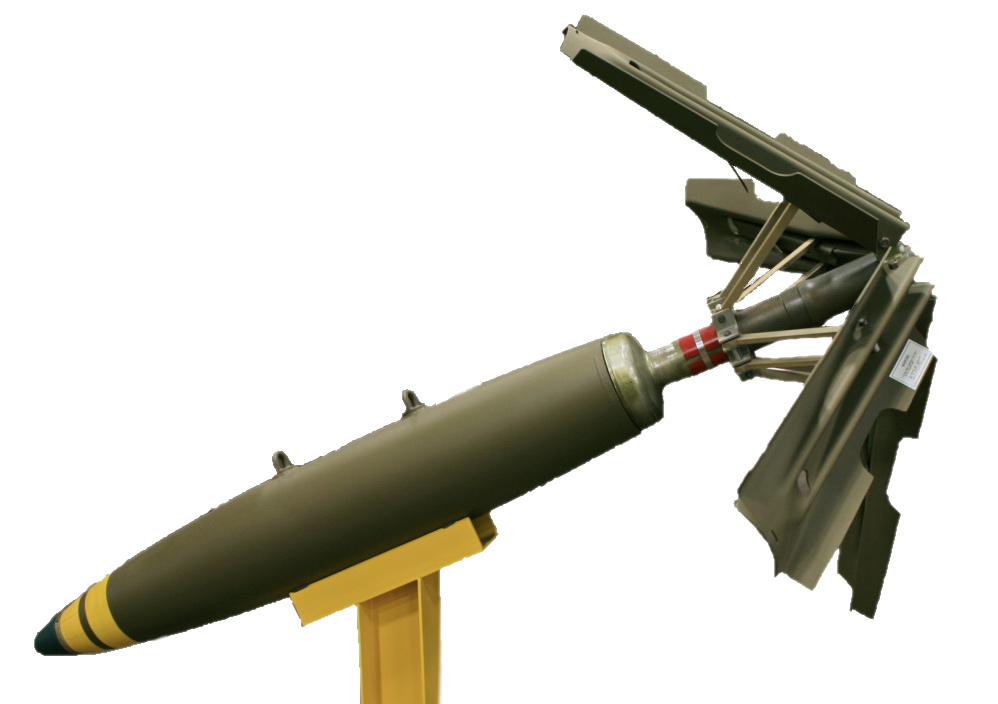
Mk. 82/Snakeye I 500-lb bomb with tail retarding device

At approximately 14:00 local time both RFA Sir Tristram and RFA Sir Galahad were attacked and badly damaged by five A-4Bs of Grupo 5.

Three A-4s targeted Sir Galahad, which was hit by three bombs released from the Skyhawk flown by First Lieutenant Carlos Cachón. The second Skyhawk was unable to drop its bombs, and the third overshot the British ship. The explosions and subsequent fires killed 48 men aboard Sir Galahad, of whom 32 were soldiers from the Welsh Guards — most of the Welsh Guards were assembling on the open tank deck when the final bomb exploded.

The remaining two aircraft attacked Sir Tristram, which was struck by two bombs released by package leader Lieutenant Daniel Gálvez; the bombs of the last A-4 fell short. The attack killed two crewmen, both of them Hong Kong Chinese sailors.

=== Second strike ===
At 16:50 a second wave, composed by four A-4Bs of Grupo 5 hit and sank the LCU Foxtrot-4 from HMS Fearless in Choiseul Sound. The landing craft was transporting the vehicles and communications equipment and nine soldiers, of 5 Brigade's headquarters, from Darwin to Bluff Cove. Six crew on board were killed, Colour Sergeant Brian Johnston, Sergeant R. J. Rotherham, Marine R. D. Griffin, Marine A. J. Rundle, Royal Navy MEA A. S. James and LMEM D. Miller. However, this time the Sea Harrier combat air patrol was already on scene and responded; three Skyhawks were shot down and their pilots, First Lieutenant Danilo Bolzan, Lieutenant Juan Arrarás, and Ensign Alfredo Vazquez were killed.

Bolzan and Vazquez were shot down by Flight Lieutenant David Morgan while Arrarás was shot down by Morgan's wingman, Lieutenant David Smith. The fourth aircraft, which was flown by First Lieutenant Héctor Sánchez, suffered combat damage and lost a large amount of fuel, but returned to the mainland assisted by a KC-130 tanker. A third wave, by A-4Cs of Grupo 4, arrived minutes later and dropped bombs on ground targets without visible success.

=== Attack on HMS Plymouth ===
In a separate incident, the frigate HMS Plymouth, on her own passing through Falkland Sound. was the target of the five Daggers from Rio Grande, which struck her with four 1,000-pound bombs. The warship sustained severe damage, and five crewmen were injured. Although all the bombs were duds, the attack caused the explosion of at least one depth charge on her flight deck.

== Aftermath ==
A total of 56 British servicemen were killed, and 150 wounded. The incident marked the greatest loss of life among British forces in the Falklands War, and accounted for one-fifth of British fatalities in the entire conflict. Sir Galahad was damaged beyond repair and scuttled with torpedoes by submarine HMS Onyx on 21 June. American author Robert Bolia blames the disaster on the use of large LST ships instead of LCUs and other small vessels.

BBC television cameras recorded images of Royal Navy helicopters hovering in thick smoke to winch survivors from the burning landing ships. Peter Owen Edmunds, a platoon commander in the Welsh Guards, who survived the attack, later described the psychological impact, saying that having endured this experience he could face "most of what life could throw" with "some equanimity".

General Mario Menendez, commander of Argentine forces on the islands, was told that hundreds of men had been killed. He expected a drop in British morale and their advance to slacken. Instead, the attacks delayed the scheduled British advance on Port Stanley by just two days, and Argentine forces on the islands surrendered six days after the incident.

According to Brigadier Julian Thompson "[5 Brigade] actually hadn't seen the Argentine Air Force work, because for the five days they'd been there, the bad weather had kept the Argentine Air Force away; so they hadn't seen how deadly those guys could be. I can tell you, if I'd have been on board that ship I would have swum ashore rather than stay there."

Among the wounded was Simon Weston, who later featured in a BBC documentary about the treatment for his 25% third degree burns. Weston endured 75 operations in 22 years. In a subsequent documentary, filmed in Argentina, he met the pilot who bombed his ship, Carlos Cachón, who was by then retired with the rank of captain. They have since become friends. Cachón was born near Balcarce and raised in Mar del Plata, where he currently lives. He is the chief of the security staff in the local offices of the Bank of the Argentine Nation. Cachón was awarded the honorific title of "Illustrious Citizen" by the city council of Mar del Plata on 25 February 2010.

Mike Rose has described the official investigation as a whitewash. In the TV documentary Falklands War: The Untold Story he says "the board of inquiry into the loss of the Tristram and the Galahad turned out to have been a complete whitewash, by saying it was necessary to open up a southern flank. Actually the opposite is true by 180 degrees. But that remains in the public record today."

A memorial for the British servicemen killed in the attack was erected at Fitzroy, along with a separate memorial to the ships' crew who lost their lives.
