= Claude Berners Westmacott =

Brigadier-General Claude Berners Westmacott CBE
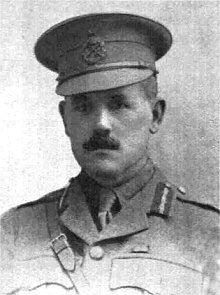
- Born: 28 October 1865; County Durham, England
- Died: 15 March 1948 (aged 82)
- Military career
- Allegiance: United Kingdom
- Branch: British Army
- Service years: 1883–1920
- Rank: Brigadier-General
- Units: Northumberland Fusiliers; Worcestershire Regiment
- Commands: 2nd Battalion, Worcestershire Regiment; 5th Infantry Brigade; No. 6 District
- Conflicts: Second Boer War; First World War
- Awards: Commander of the Order of the British Empire

Brigadier-General Claude Berners Westmacott CBE (28 October 1865 – 15 March 1948) was a British Army officer who served his country for over thirty years, fighting in the Second Boer War and the First World War.

== Early life ==
Claude Berners Westmacott was born on 28 October 1865 at Wickham, County Durham, to Percy Graham Buchanan Westmacott and Annette Beatrice (née Berners). He received his initial education at Eton College.

== Early military career ==
On 5 May 1888, Westmacott was transferred from the 3rd (Militia) Battalion, Northumberland Fusiliers (later the Royal Northumberland Fusiliers), and was gazetted as a second lieutenant into the Worcestershire Regiment, subsequently joining the 1st Battalion, Worcesters, in India. He was promoted to lieutenant in December 1889 and appointed adjutant of the battalion in November 1892, a position he held for the next four years.

In December 1896, he was promoted to captain and remained with the 1st Worcesters in India until August 1898, when he returned home to assume the role of adjutant of the 4th (Militia) Battalion, Worcesters, which later became the 6th Battalion in February 1900. He held this position for five years, during which time he served in South Africa during the Second Boer War with the battalion, earning a medal with two clasps and being mentioned in dispatches in July 1902.

He then rejoined the 1st Battalion in Templemore and was promoted to major on 14 February 1904, remaining with the 1st Battalion until he took command of the regimental depot in 1906.

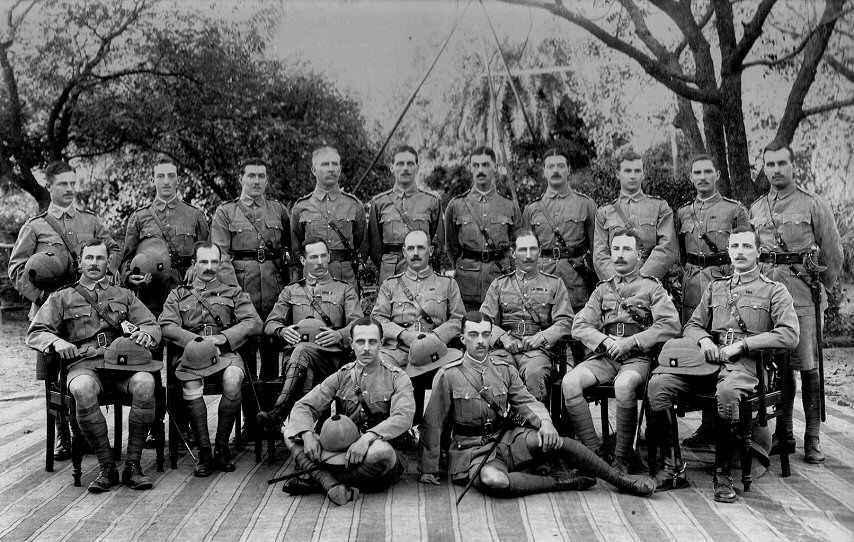
Officers of the 2nd Battalion, Worcestershire Regiment, at Jhansi, India, December 1911. Sat in the middle row in the centre is Lieutenant Colonel C. B. Westmacott, the battalion' s CO.

In 1909, he became second-in-command of the 1st Battalion, a role he held until March 1911, when he was promoted to lieutenant colonel and took command of the 2nd Battalion at Jhansi, succeeding Lieutenant Colonel H. de B. Hovell. He brought the battalion home to Aldershot, Hampshire, in March 1913, and after seventeen months of intense training, war with Germany broke out in August 1914 (see British entry into World War I.)

== First World War ==
Later that month he led the 2nd Battalion to France, commanding it until September, when he temporarily took over the battalion's parent formation, the 5th Infantry Brigade, part of the 2nd Division, leaving the battalion on the Aisne under Major E. B. Hankey. He was appointed a temporary brigadier general on 2 November and ADC to the king (extra) in February 1915. He also took over the 1st Division 's 2nd Infantry Brigade from Major General Edward Bulfin from the same date.

He was mentioned in dispatches twice, in October 1914 and again in February 1915, and in March he was promoted to substantive colonel, with seniority backdated to June 1914.

Following a breakdown of his health, he was invalided home from France and, after briefly serving on half-pay from October to November 1915, was placed in command of a brigade. He later relinquished his temporary brigadier's rank in August 1918, reverting to substantive colonel, and succeeded Colonel Henry O'Donnell in command of No. 6 District in the UK.

He was awarded the CBE in June 1919, by which time the war was over. He retired from the army, being granted the honorary rank of brigadier general, in March 1920.

== Postwar and final years ==
Post-retirement, he actively participated in the British Legion at Lichfield and served as chairman of the Worcestershire Regiment's Old Comrades' Association from its inception until December 1945. While stationed in Plymouth with the 1st Worcesters in 1897, he married Miss Lily Taylor, who predeceased him by a few months; the couple had no children. Brigadier General Westmacott was an avid sportsman who took up archery with notable success in his later years.

Brigadier General Westmacott passed away suddenly on 15 March 1948, at the age of 82, at Wall House, Lichfield, and was buried with military honours at Wall Parish Church on 18 March 1948. The Worcestershire Regiment was represented at the funeral by the-then colonel of the regiment, Brigadier B. C. S. Clarke, who had served as his adjutant from 1912 to 1914, and Lieutenant Colonel L. G. H. Bryant, the CO at Norton; a bugler sounded the "Last Post" and "Reveille," and the regiment sent a wreath.
