= Bluff Cove =

Bay and settlement in Falkland Islands, UK

Coordinates: 51.745°S 58.165°W

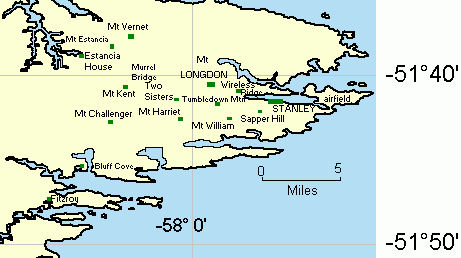

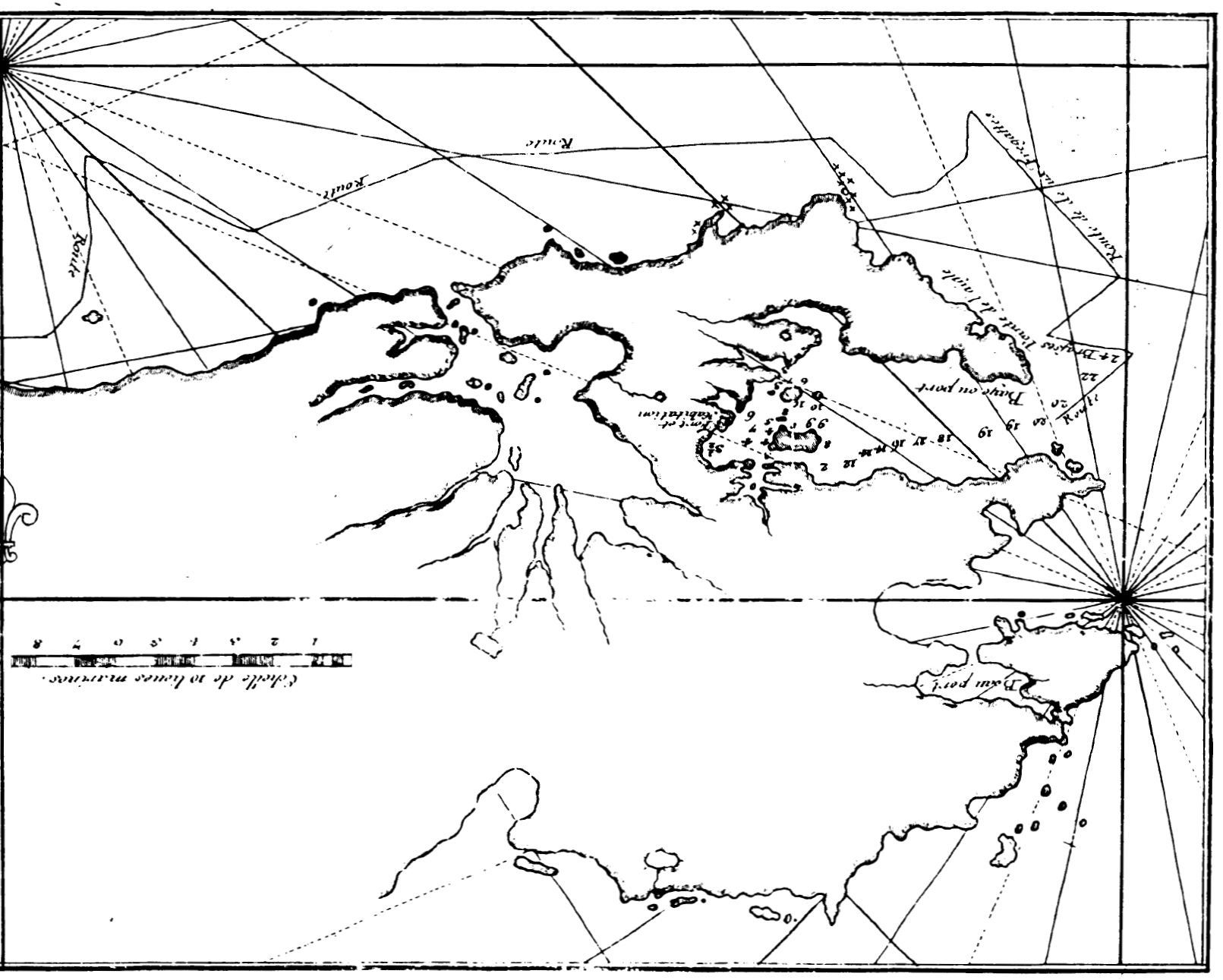
Early mapping of Bluff Cove (Dom Pernety, 1769)

Bluff Cove is a sea inlet and settlement on East Falkland, in the Falkland Islands, on its east coast. It was the site of secondary landings of the Falklands War of 1982, which resulted in a successful attack of the Argentine Air Force, which came to be known as the Bluff Cove Disaster.

It is near the Mount Pleasant highway.

On 8 June 1982, the 1st Welsh Guards were aboard RFA Sir Galahad also waiting to be landed at Bluff Cove when Sir Galahad and RFA Sir Tristram were attacked by Argentinian Skyhawk fighters who caught them by surprise. Both ships were badly hit. The explosions and subsequent fires resulted in heavy casualties on board Sir Galahad. Forty-eight people, including thirty-two Welsh Guards, were killed or severely wounded, with many suffering terrible burns. The wreck of Sir Galahad was scuttled after the war, torpedoed by the submarine HMS Onyx. The hulk was declared a war grave. The disabled Sir Tristram was transferred to the United Kingdom where she underwent a major overhaul.

== Climate ==
Tundra climates are characterised by sub-freezing mean annual temperatures, large annual temperature ranges, and moderately low precipitation.

== Tourist destination and penguin habitat ==
The farm adjacent to Bluff Cove was purchased in 2005 by Hattie and Kevin Kilmartin. The cove houses a large number of penguins, including King Penguins, Gentoos, and other wildlife such as Skua seabirds, Ruddy Headed Geese, and Falkland Steamer ducks.

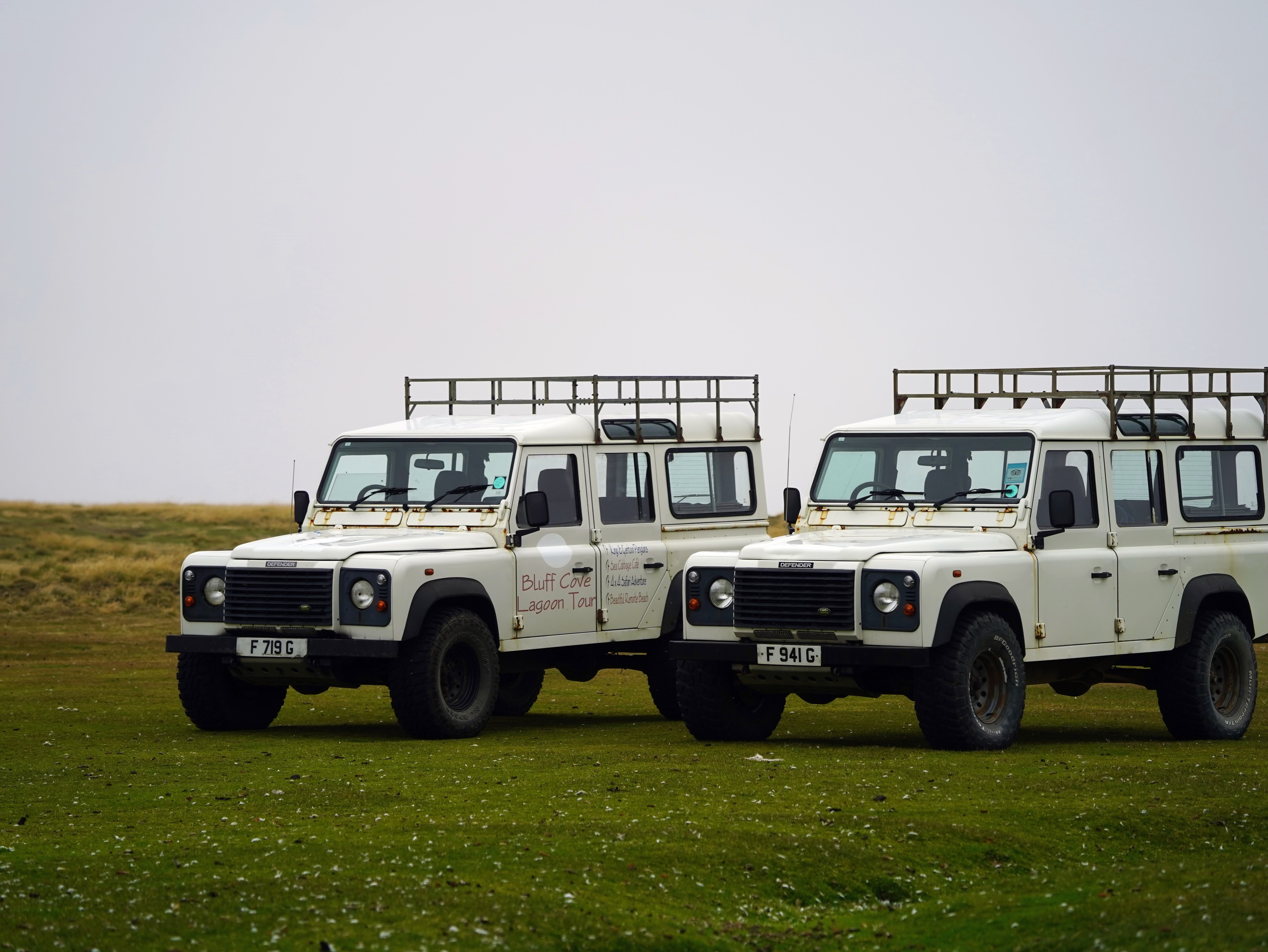
Bluff Cove Ranger Land Rovers

Today the cove is private and can only be accessed by tours purchased onboard the visiting cruise ships, meaning visitors arriving at the Falkland Islands by any other means cannot visit.

=== Sea Cabbage Cafe ===
The cove contains a cafe named 'The Sea Cabbage Cafe', that serves tea and home-baked goods including biscuits and cakes, and has a seating area. A tea or coffee, and two baked goods items are offered on a complimentary basis to each guest.

The site also contains a gift shop with themed merchandise and a small museum discussing the history of the site.

=== Bluff Cove Museum ===
The Museum displays range from penguins to pioneers and include the life of Falkland Island sheep farmers and the history of Bluff Cove Farm. Find out about the qualities of Falkland wool, local woollen crafts and spinning the wool into yarn. The farm exhibits also tell the role of horses on Falkland farms, and about life in “camp” (the countryside, taken from the Gaucho word “campo”); schooling, transport including the air taxis and coastal shipping, communications, traditional music, peat cutting, Sports Week and doctor’s camp visits.

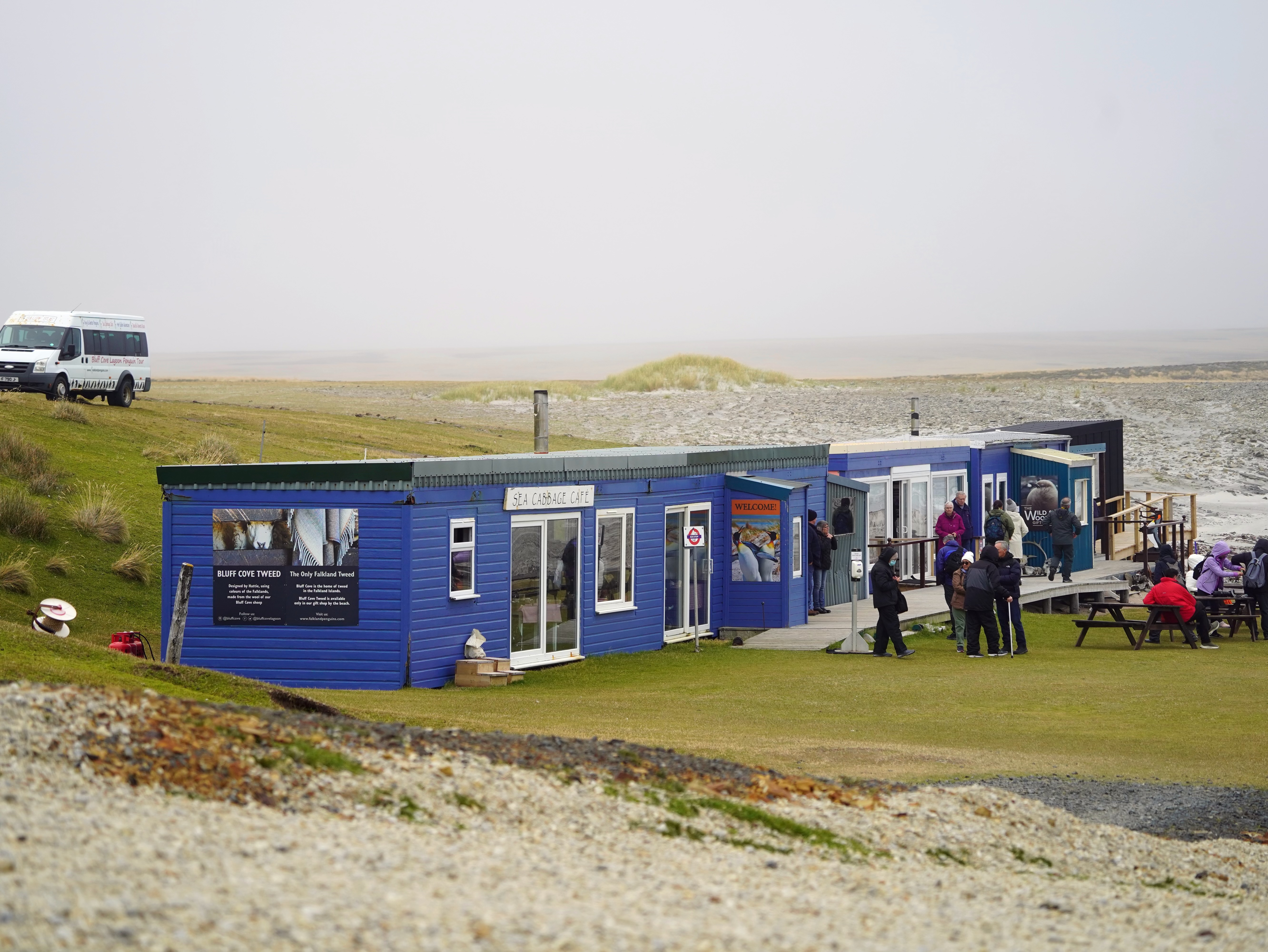
The Sea Cabbage Cafe, Museum, and Gift Shop

Other exhibits include: Falkland Flavours – as well as the rearing of farm animals, harvesting our seasonal wild foods – egging, gosling-chasing, fishing, berry-picking and foraging for mushrooms. Charles Darwin rode with Gauchos across the farm in 1834 on his round the world scientific journey which led to his theory of evolution. The “Sugar Wreck” (Prussian Barque Adeline) – one of many shipwrecks around our coast – wrecked at Bluff Cove in 1863, was named after a cargo of “sugar loaves”, which gave their name to mountains such as Sugar Loaf in Rio. The 1982 war with Argentina, focusing on the Yellow Beach landings on Bluff Cove Farm and life during the occupation. The defeat of Argentina brought back democracy to Argentina and permitted the Falkland Islanders to determine their own futures. Lagoon wildlife and marine life, the geology, stone-runs and fossils. And the role of the Falkland Islands in fishing, sealing and whaling.

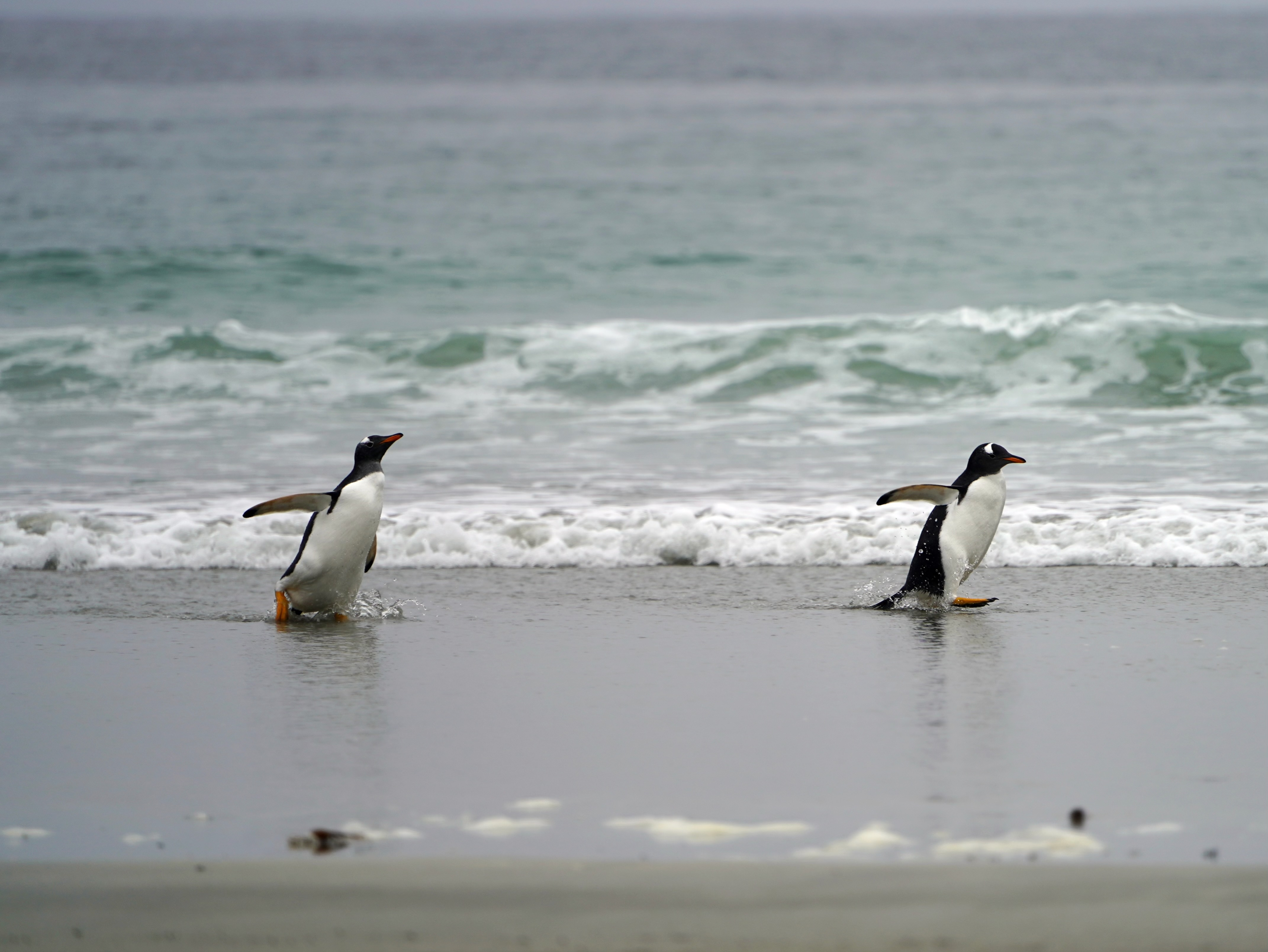
Penguins on the beach at Bluff Cove
