= Thermic fluid heater =

A thermic fluid heater is industrial heating equipment, used where only heat transfers are desired instead of pressure. In this equipment, a thermic fluid is circulated in the entire system for heat transfers to the desired processes. Combustion process heats up the thermic fluid, and this fluid carries and rejects this heat to the desired fluid for concluding the processes. After rejecting it, this fluid comes back again to the thermic fluid heater and this cycle goes on.
