= RMS St Helena (1963) =

History
- Name: Northland Prince (1963–1977); St Helena (1978–1990); St Helena Island (1990-1990); Avalon (1990-1993); Indoceanique (1993-1996)
- Owner: Northland Navigation Company (1963–1977); Privatbanken / St Helena Shipping (1978–1990)
- Operator: Northland Navigation Company (1963–1977); Curnow Shipping (1978–1990)
- Port of registry: (Canada) Vancouver (1963-1977); (United Kingdom) London (1977-1980); Jamestown, Saint Helena (1980–1990)
- Route: Vancouver-Alaska (1963–1977); Avonmouth-Saint Helena-Cape Town (1978–1990)
- Builder: Burrard Dry Dock, North Vancouver
- Yard number: 314
- Launched: 2 February 1963
- Maiden voyage: 5 October 1978 (as St Helena)
- Identification: IMO number: 5257634; Callsign: GXUY
- Fate: Scrapped 9 April 1996

General characteristics
- Type: Cargo liner
- Tonnage: 3,150 GRT; 2,228 DWT
- Length: 98 m (321.52 ft)
- Beam: 14 m (45.93 ft)
- Draught: 5.49 m (18.01 ft)
- Installed power: 4,200 bhp
- Propulsion: 1 × Stork-Werkspoor diesel engine
- Speed: 16.5 knots (30.6 km/h; 19.0 mph) (service)
- Capacity: 88 (normal)

RMS St Helena was a passenger-cargo liner, built in 1963 as Northland Prince, operated by the St. Helena Shipping Company that operated between Britain and South Africa via the British colony of Saint Helena between 1978 and 1990.

== History ==
St Helena was constructed in 1963 by Burrard Dry Dock in North Vancouver, Canada as the Northland Prince, and operated under that name between Vancouver and Alaska.

The ship was purchased by the St. Helena Shipping Company, which had been formed as a joint venture between the Saint Helena Government and Falmouth-based shipping firm Curnow Shipping to operate an ocean mail service to the island after the Union-Castle Line ceased operations in 1977. She underwent a refit, was renamed St Helena, and entered service in September 1978 on a route from Avonmouth, England to Cape Town, South Africa, calling en route at Las Palmas, Canary Islands, and Jamestown, Saint Helena. She continued on this route, interrupted by British government service during the Falklands War, until 1990 when she was replaced by a new ship, also named St Helena. St Helena was sold and subsequently renamed St Helena Island, Avalon and Indoceanique. She was laid up for several years, as a planned service in the Indian Ocean never materialized, before being scrapped in 1996.

St Helena measured 3,150 gross register tons, and was 321 feet (98 m) long, with a beam of 46 feet (14 m). She was propelled by a single diesel engine and propeller, which gave her a service speed of 16.5 knots (19.0 mph). She had a passenger capacity of 88 in a single class configuration.
