= Oropesa (minesweeping) =

Towed body used in minesweeping

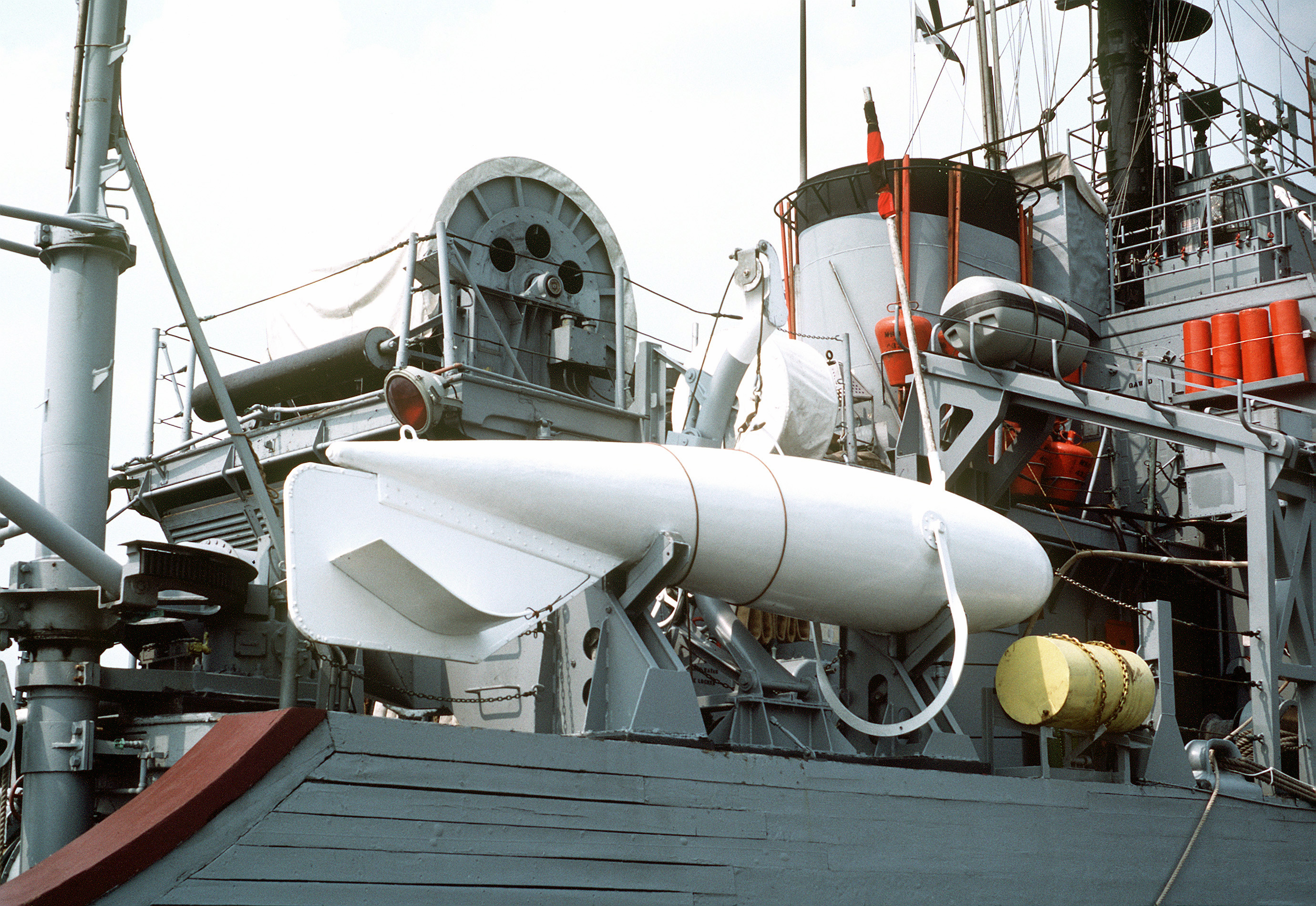
Oropesa minesweeping float

An oropesa is a streamlined towed body used in the process of minesweeping. The role of the oropesa is to keep the towed sweep at a determined depth and position from the sweeping ship. Oropesa are standard devices used on Avenger-class mine countermeasures ships.

The device derives its name from the ship on which it was developed, HMS Oropesa, a converted British steam trawler.

== See also ==
- Paravane – Minesweeping device
- Naval mine – Weapon for use in waters, triggered by the target's approach
