= Clelands Shipbuilding Company =

British shipbuilding company

- Company type: Private
- Industry: Shipbuilding
- Founded: 1866
- Defunct: 1984
- Fate: Acquired
- Successor: Swan Hunter
- Headquarters: Wallsend, UK

Clelands Shipbuilding Company was a leading British shipbuilding company. The company was based in Wallsend was nationalised by the British Government. It was founded in 1864 by John and Thomas Cleland, and operated until it was acquired by Swan Hunter & Wigham Richardson in 1967. The company built a variety of ships, including passenger ships, cargo ships, and naval vessels.

== History ==
The company was established by William Cleland in 1866 as Clelands Shipbuilding Company. It was based at Willington Quay in Wallsend and became one of the UK's leading builders of coastal vessels. During the 1930s it got into financial difficulties and for a while was known as Clelands (Successors) Ltd. It was acquired by Swan Hunter in 1967 and was nationalised in 1977 at which time it was subsumed into British Shipbuilders. The yard closed down in 1984.

== See also ==
- List of shipbuilders and shipyards
