= RV Odyssey Explorer =

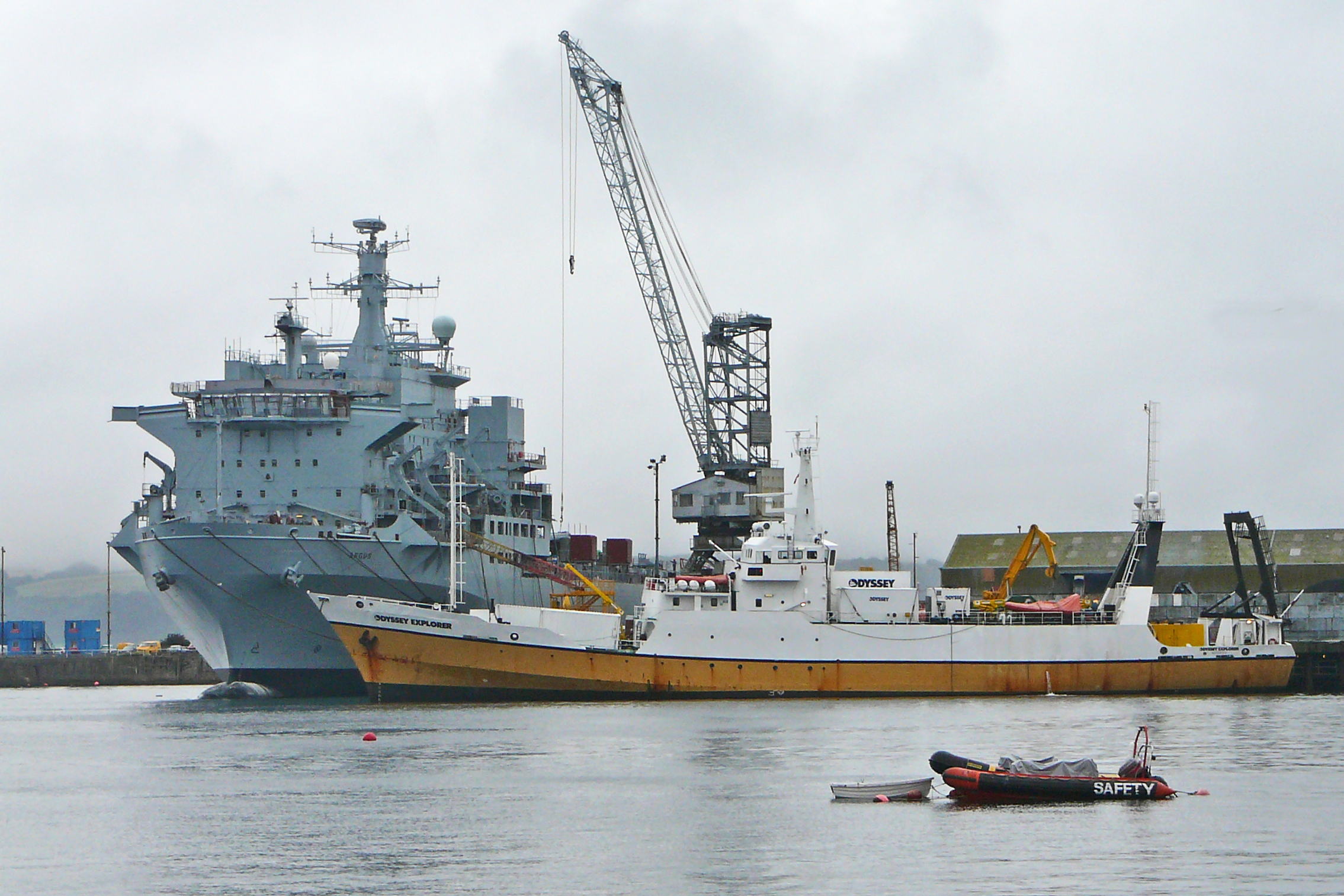
- R/V Odyssey Explorer (front) and the RFA Argus, Falmouth, United Kingdom

History

United Kingdom
- Name: Farnella, later Northern Prince
- Owner: Farnella Ltd., later Northern Prince Ltd.
- Builder: Clelands Shipbuilding Co., Ltd.
- Yard number: 572
- Launched: December 2, 1971
- Completed: April 24, 1972
- Renamed: April 1, 1994
- Home port: Hull
- Identification: IMO number: 7125811; Call sign: C60S4; MMSI number: 309814000
- Fate: Sold
- Notes: Use: Stern trawler, Deep-sea freight transport

Bahamas
- Name: Odyssey Explorer
- Owner: Odyssey Retriever Inc. (Odyssey Marine Exploration)
- Operator: Marr Vessel Management Ltd.
- Acquired: August 7, 2003
- Home port: Nassau, Bahamas
- Identification: Call sign 3EGK2
- Fate: Sold
- Notes: Use: Rescue/Salvage ship

Panama
- Name: Empire Persia
- Owner: Risdon Beazley Marine Ltd
- Port of registry: Panama
- Acquired: 2016
- Identification: Call sign: 3EGK2
- Fate: Scrapped in Esbjerg, 2024
- Notes: Use: Offshore supply ship

General characteristics
- Tonnage: 1,431 GT, 509 NT, 1,697 GRT, 612 DWT
- Length: 70.2 m (230 ft 4 in) LWL; 76 m (249 ft 4 in) LOA
- Beam: 12.65 m (41 ft 6 in)
- Draft: 8.11 m (26 ft 7 in)
- Installed power: 2,782 bhp (2,075 kW)
- Propulsion: Lister Blackstone diesel engine
- Speed: max 9.3 knots (17.2 km/h; 10.7 mph)

RV Odyssey Explorer was a salvage and recovery vessel owned by Odyssey Marine Exploration. It was sold in 2016 and renamed Empire Persia by the Latvian business conglomerate which purchased the vessel.

== Falklands Conflict ==
In 1982 Odyssey Explorer was operating out of Kingston upon Hull under the name Farnella as a stern trawler. Upon the outbreak of the Falklands Conflict, Farnella, along with three sister ships, was taken up from trade by the Royal Navy and commissioned as a stop-gap minesweeper for operations in the South Atlantic. HMS Farnella was returned to her owners in October 1982.

== Dispute with Spain ==
On October 16, 2007 Spain seized Odyssey Explorer as it sailed out of port from the British overseas territory of Gibraltar. The vessel's captain, Sterling Vorus, claimed to have been in international waters, but was forced to dock at Algeciras under what Vorus declared was "threat of deadly force". Once in port Vorus was eventually arrested for disobedience after refusing inspection of the vessel without first receiving approval of Odyssey Explorer's flag state, the Commonwealth of the Bahamas. Vorus was released the following day. Aboard Odyssey Explorer at the time of seizure were about a dozen journalists and photographers, all of whom had their video tapes, tape recorders and computer memory storage devices seized by Spanish officials.

== Sold for scrap ==
In August 2024 the Danish firm Smedegaarden confirmed it had purchased the vessel for recycling. The ship's last voyage was under tow from Skagen to Esbjerg.
