= 5th Infantry Brigade (United Kingdom) =

5th Brigade 5th Infantry Brigade 5th Airborne Brigade
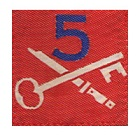
- Badge of 5th Infantry Brigade
- Active: 1908-1918; 1935-1976; 1982-1999
- Country: United Kingdom
- Branch: British Army
- Type: Infantry
- Role: Airborne Infantry brigade
- Size: Brigade
- Part of: 3rd (UK) Division
- Garrison/HQ: Aldershot Garrison
- Engagements: First World War; Second World War; Indonesia–Malaysia confrontation The Troubles; Falklands War

Commanders
- Notable commanders: Michael West

The 5th Infantry Brigade was a regular infantry brigade of the British Army that existed from before the First World War until 1999, except for a short break in the late 1970s. It was an Airborne Brigade from the early 1980s until amalgamating with 24th Airmobile Brigade, in 1999, to form 16 Air Assault Brigade.

== History ==
During the Boer War, the 5th Infantry Brigade, then known as the Irish Brigade, fought in the Battle of Colenso under Major General Arthur Fitzroy Hart. It consisted of the 1st Royal Dublin Fusiliers, 1st Inniskilling Fusiliers, 1st Connaught Rangers, and the 1st Border Regiment.

Following the end of the Boer war in 1902 the army was restructured, and a 3rd Infantry division was established permanently at Bordon as part of the 1st Army Corps, comprising the 5th and 6th Infantry Brigades.

=== World Wars ===
The brigade was part of the 2nd Division during the First World War and was one of the first British units to be sent overseas on the outbreak of war. The brigade became part of the British Expeditionary Force and saw action on the Western Front in the Battle of Mons and the subsequent Great Retreat and at the First Battle of Ypres, which saw the old Regular Army virtually destroyed.

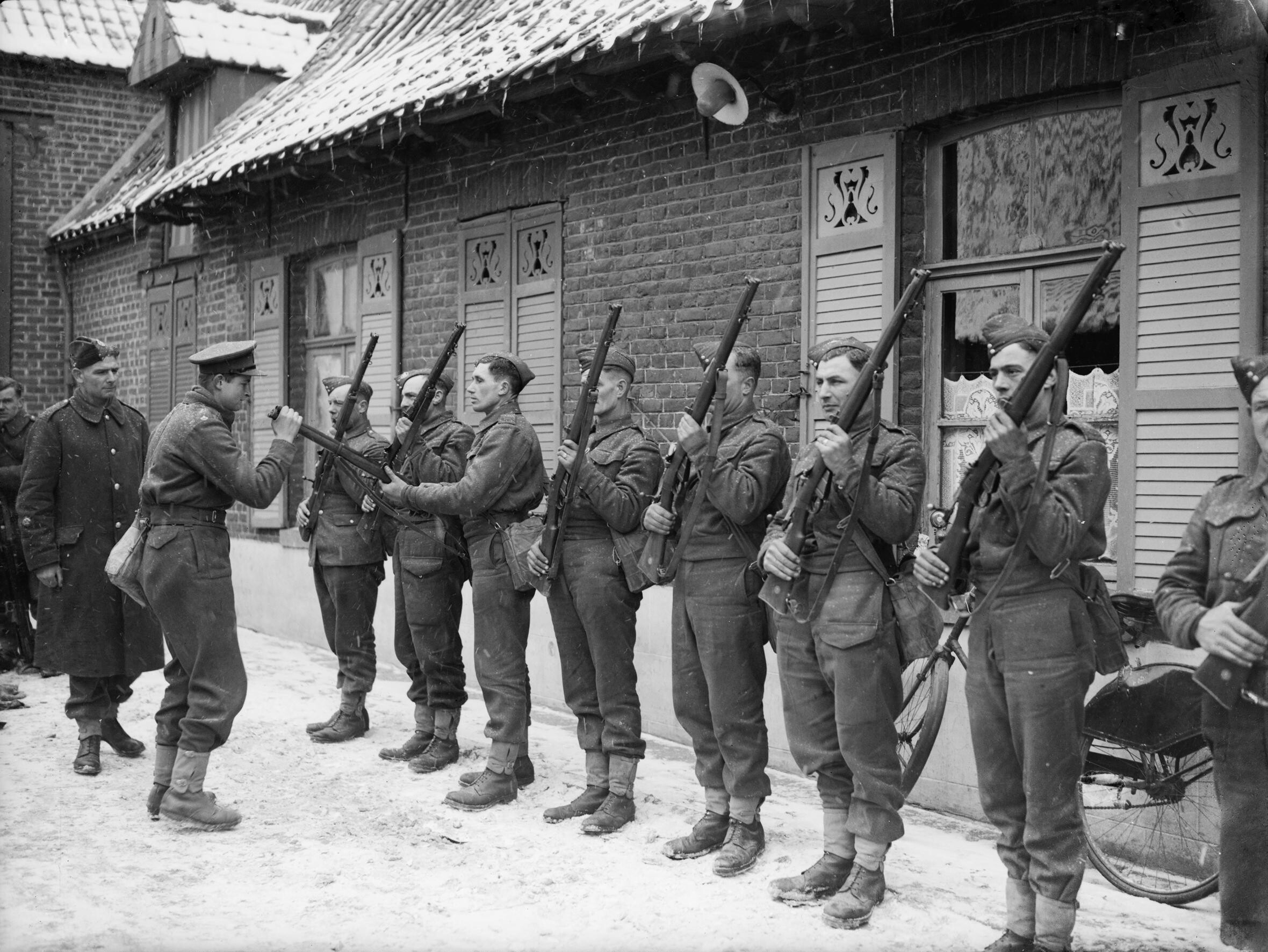
Rifle inspection for men of the 2nd Battalion, Dorsetshire Regiment at Rumegies, 14 February 1940.

During the Second World War, the 5th Brigade was again part of the 2nd Infantry Division and was sent to France in 1939 shortly after the outbreak of war, where it joined the British Expeditionary Force. It served on the Franco-Belgian border until May 1940, when it was evacuated at Dunkirk after fighting in the short but fierce battles of France and Belgium in which the German Army nearly cut off the entire BEF from the French Army. With the division, the brigade remained in Britain on home defence until 10 April 1942, when it was shipped out to India to fight the Imperial Japanese Army after a series of disasters suffered by the British and Indian troops stationed there. The 5th Brigade served with the 2nd Infantry Division in the Burma Campaign under General Slim's British Fourteenth Army and fought in the Battle of Kohima, which managed to help turn the tide of the campaign in the Far East.

=== Post 1945 ===
Following the war, it was part of the British Commonwealth Occupation Force in Japan, and then the British Army of the Rhine until 1964, when the Brigade Group was released to bolster the strategic reserve. It arrived in Borneo in October 1965 to take control of the Mid West Sector during the Indonesia–Malaysia confrontation, but by 1968 it was back in the United Kingdom as part of the 3rd Infantry Division. It did a tour in Northern Ireland during the early part of the Troubles.

In 1979-80 Headquarters 8 Field Force was heavily involved in directing the Commonwealth Monitoring Force during the transition to the newly independent state of Zimbabwe.

In the early 1980s, the Field Force concept was dropped in favour of traditional Brigades; 5th Infantry Brigade was reformed at Aldershot in January 1982 by the redesignation of 8th Field Force. The Brigade consisted of the former elements of the Parachute Contingency Force (PCF) from 6 Field Force (which became the 1st Infantry Brigade), at the time 2 PARA, together with a second Parachute Battalion from 8 Field Force (3 PARA).

==== Falklands War ====
The Brigade was sent to the Falklands in 1982 as the follow-on force to 3rd Commando Brigade. Having had its two Parachute Regiment battalions withdrawn to reinforce 3 Commando Brigade, it was hurriedly reconstituted with two Guards battalions pulled from Public duties in London and No. 63 Squadron RAF Regiment, (based at RAF Gütersloh, Germany) initially to provide additional Short Range Air Defence (SHORAD) of land forces landing at San Carlos Water.

==== 5th Airborne Brigade ====
Following the Falklands War, it was converted into 5th Airborne Brigade by its Commander, Brigadier Tony Jeapes. The brigade consisted of two battalions of the Parachute Regiment, a Gurkha battalion, and a Territorial Army infantry battalion, together with additional parachute support elements and a small parachute deployable Brigade HQ. The 7th Parachute Regiment RHA returned from Germany and was converted to an airborne unit and attached to the brigade. A Brigade Logistic Battalion was formed. On 1 September 1999, the brigade merged with 24 Airmobile Brigade to produce 16 Air Assault Brigade.

== Structure ==
=== First World War Order of Battle ===
The brigade was part of 2nd Division. The brigade commanded the following units in the First World War:

- 2nd Battalion, Worcestershire Regiment (transferred to 33rd Division on 15 December 1915)
- 2nd Battalion, Oxfordshire and Buckinghamshire Light Infantry
- 2nd Battalion, Highland Light Infantry
- 2nd Battalion, Connaught Rangers (transferred to 3rd (Lahore) Division on 26 November 1914)
- 1/9th Battalion, (Glasgow Highlanders), Highland Light Infantry (November 1914 to January 1916)
- 2nd Battalion, Royal Inniskilling Fusiliers (January to July 1915)
- 1st Battalion, Queen's (Royal West Surrey Regiment) (July to December 1915)* 1/7th Battalion, King's (Liverpool Regiment) (September to November 1915)
- 17th (Service) Battalion, Royal Fusiliers (Empire) (December 1915 to February 1918)
- 24th (Service) Battalion, Royal Fusiliers (2nd Sportsman's) (from December 1915)
- 5th Machine Gun Company (from 1 January 1916 to 4 March 1918")
- 5th Trench Mortar Battery (from March 1916")

=== Second World War Order of Battle ===
The brigade commanded the following units in the Second World War:

- 2nd Battalion, Royal Warwickshire Regiment (until 5 February 1940)
- 2nd Battalion, Dorsetshire Regiment
- 1st Battalion, Queen's Own Cameron Highlanders
- 7th Battalion, Worcestershire Regiment (from 5 February 1940)

=== Falklands War Order of Battle ===
The final order of battle included:

- 205 signal squadron HQ, Royal Signals
- 1st Battalion, Welsh Guards
- 2nd Battalion, Scots Guards
- 1st Battalion, 7th Duke of Edinburgh's Own Gurkha Rifles
- 4th Regiment, Royal Artillery
- 1 troop of the Blues and Royals
- 63 Squadron RAF Regiment (SHORAD) (Note: Consisting of 8 Rapier fire units deployed as 2 flights (A & B flights) A1 – A4; B1 – B4. Each fire unit was equipped with Rapier Field Standard A and DN181 'Blindfire' radar. There was also an HQ Flight and an Engineering Flight.)

=== 5th Airborne Brigade ===
The 5th Airborne Brigade Order of Battle was as follows:

- HQ 5 Airborne Brigade
- 89 Abn Intelligence Section, Intelligence Corps
- No.1 Air Force Liaison Section
- 2 x Parachute Battalions (2nd and 3rd Battalions, The Parachute Regiment)
- 1 x Infantry Battalion (2nd Battalion The Wessex Regiment (Volunteers). Note that while this was a Territorial Army battalion, it was a resident unit of the brigade, not part of the Territorial Army enhancement described below).
- 1 x Gurkha Battalion (1st Battalion 7th Duke of Edinburgh's Own Gurkha Rifles)
- 1 x Armoured Recce Regiment Life Guards/ The Blues & Royals
- 4th Field Regiment Royal Artillery (1977–1983)
- 7th Parachute Regiment Royal Horse Artillery (1984 - TBA)
- Royal Pioneer Corps
- 36 Engineer Regiment Royal Engineers
  - 9 Para Squadron RE
  - 20 Sqn RE
  - 50 Field Construction Sqn RE
  - 61 Field Support Sqn RE
- 216 (Parachute) Signal Sqn Royal Signals
  - Det 224 Signal Sqn Royal Signals
- 658 Aviation Sqn Army Air Corps
- 23 Parachute Field Ambulance Royal Army Medical Corps
- 160 Provost Company Royal Military Police
- 613 Tactical Air Control Party (Parachute) RAF Regt
- 614 Tactical Air Control Party (Parachute) RAF Regt
- Logistic Battalion
  - 63 Abn Squadron Royal Corps of Transport/ Royal Logistic Corps
  - 82 Abn Ordnance Company Royal Army Ordnance Corps/ Royal Logistic Corps
  - 10 Abn Workshop Royal Electrical & Mechanical Engineers

== Commanders ==
Commanders included:

- September 1911 – 16 September 1914 Brigadier-General Richard Haking
- 16 September – 20 November 1914 Colonel Claude Berners Westmacott (acting)
- 20 November – 20 December 1914 Brigadier-General Richard Haking
- 20–31 December 1914 Lieutenant-Colonel Henry Davies (acting)
- 31 December 1914 – 13 July 1915 Brigadier-General Augustus Chichester
- 13 July 1915 – 15 May 1916 Brigadier-General Charles Corkran
- 15 May 1916 – 25 March 1918 Brigadier-General George Bullen-Smith
- 25 March – 5 April 1918 Lieutenant-Colonel Robert Pipon (acting)
- 5 April – 5 October 1918 Brigadier-General William Osborn
- 5 October – 12 November 1918 Lieutenant-Colonel Robert Pipon (acting)
- 12 November 1918 – Brigadier-General William Osborn
- 1938–1941 Brigadier Gerald Gartlan
- 1941–1942 Brigadier J.R.T. Aldous
- 1942–1944 Brigadier V.F.S. Hawkins
- 1944–1945 Brigadier M.M. Alston-Roberts-West
- 1982–1983 Brigadier Tony Wilson
- 1983–1985 Brigadier Tony Jeapes

== Sources ==
- Delaforce, Patrick (2006). Smashing the Atlantic Wall: The Destruction of Hitler's Coastal Fortresses. Pen & Sword Military. ISBN 978-1844153718.
- Van der Bijl, Nick (2014). British Military Operations in Aden and Radfan: 100 Years of British Colonial Rule. Pen & Sword Military. ISBN 9781783032914.
- Watson, Graham (2005). Germany: An Organizational History 1947-2004. General Data. ISBN 978-0972029698.
