= List of weapons in the Falklands War =

Weapons used during the Falklands War

These are some of the key weapons of the Falklands War used by both sides.

== Aircraft and weapons ==
=== Argentina ===
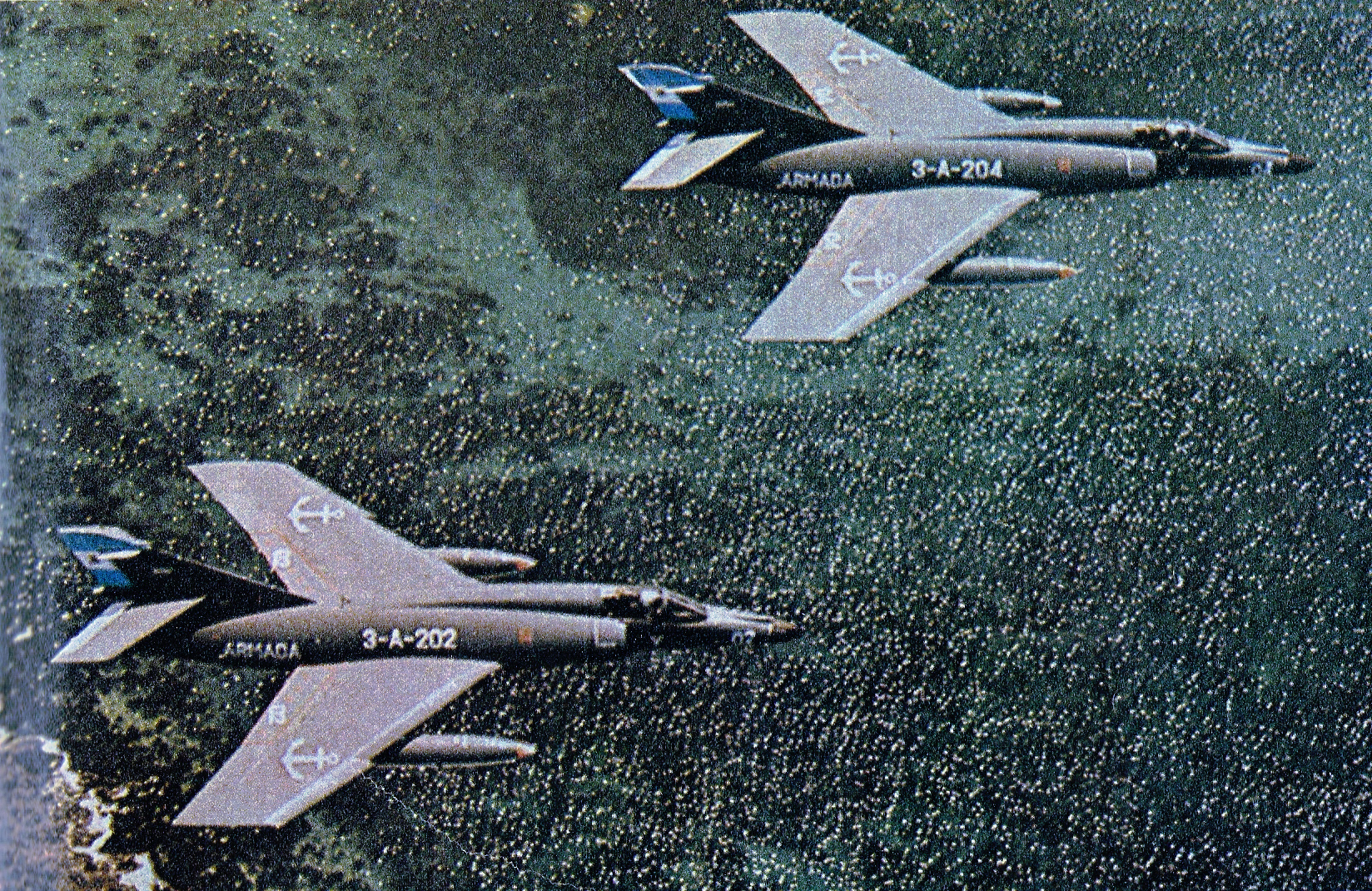
Two Argentine Naval Aviation Dassault Super Étendard strike fighters, the primary platform for the Aérospatiale AM.39 Exocet anti-ship missile.

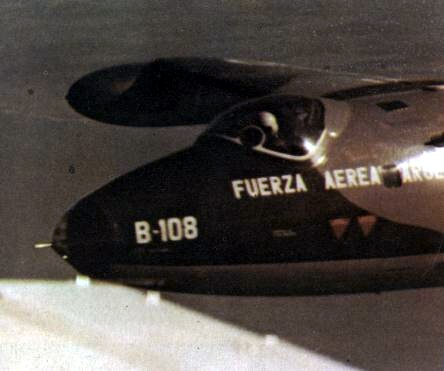
Argentine Air Force English Electric Canberra B.62 Bomber

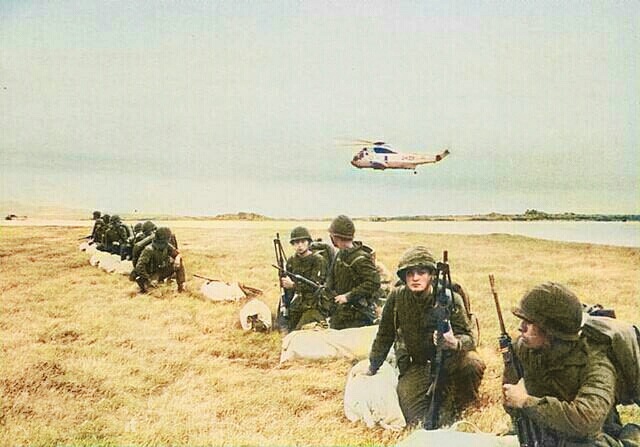
Argentine Marines during Operation Rosario. A Sikorsky SH-3 Sea King can be seen on the background.

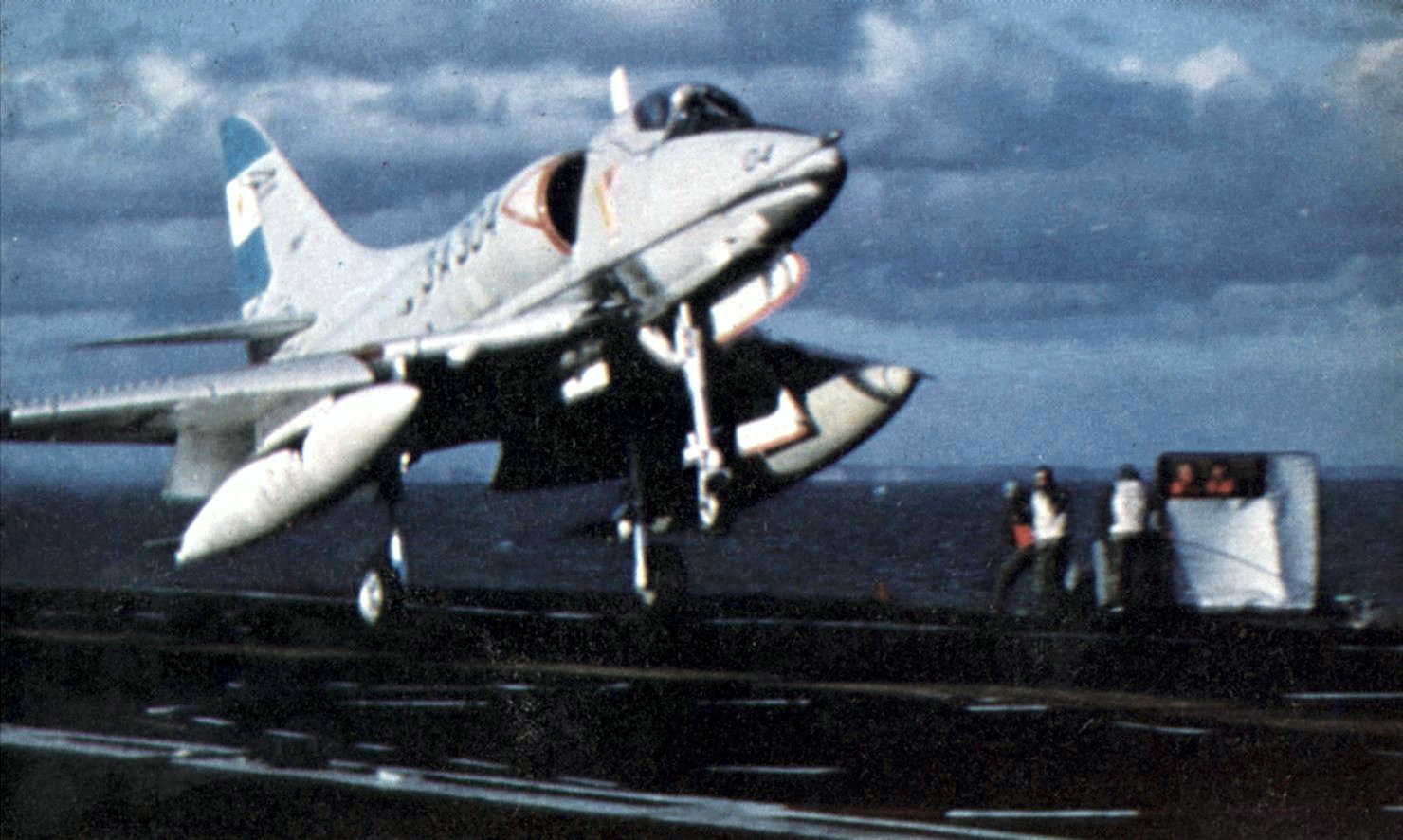
Argentine Naval Aviation Douglas A-4Q Skyhawk landing on the aircraft carrier ARA Veinticinco de Mayo.

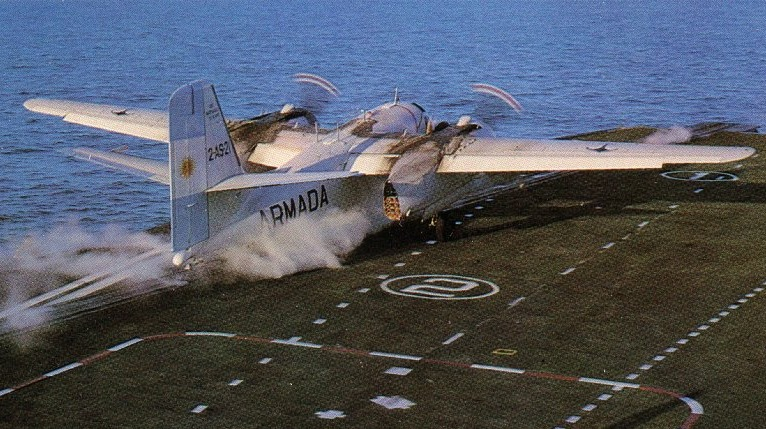
Argentine Naval Aviation Grumman S-2G Tracker taking off from the aircraft carrier ARA Veinticinco de Mayo.

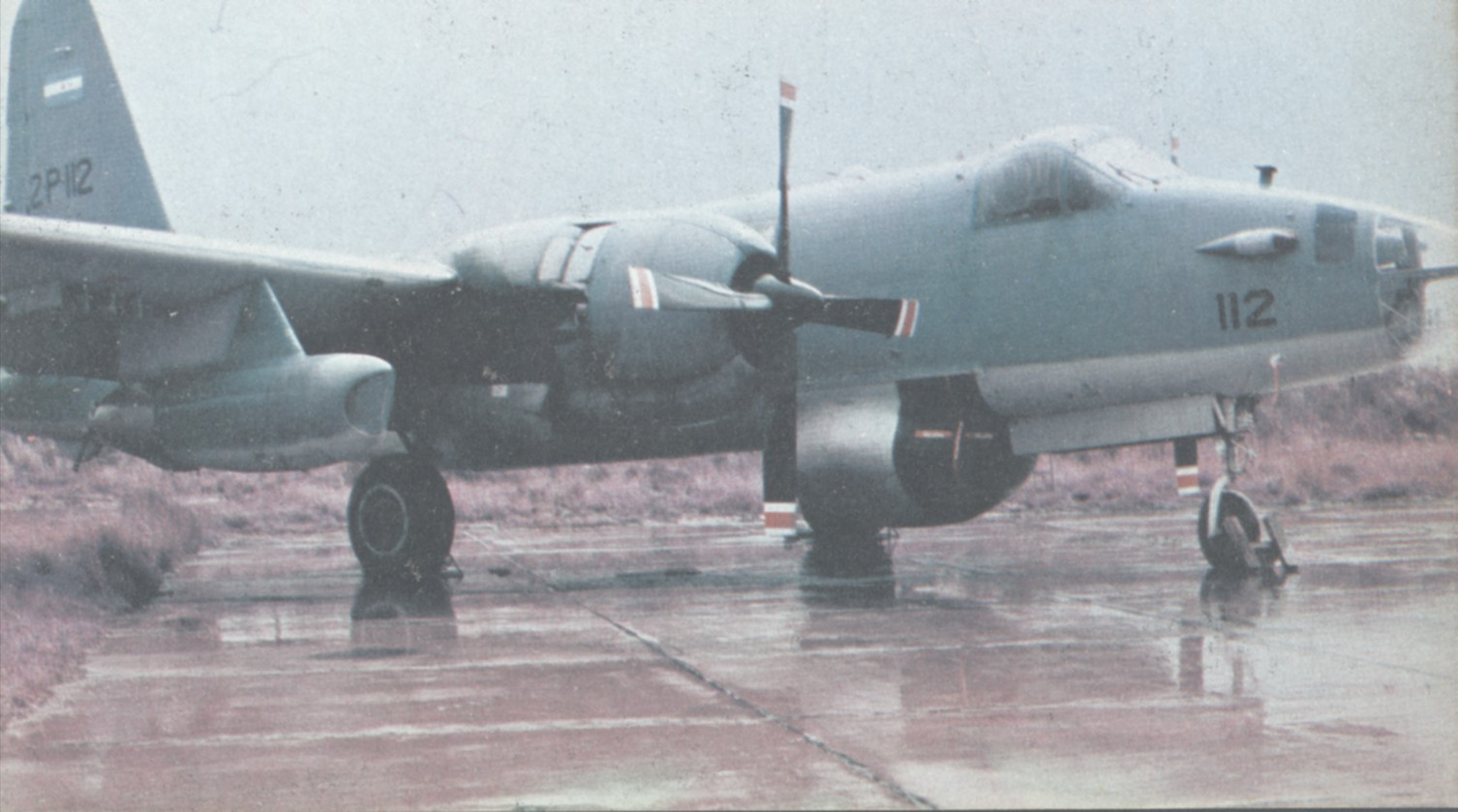
The Argentine Naval Aviation Lockheed SP-2H Neptune which tracked the British destroyer HMS Sheffield.

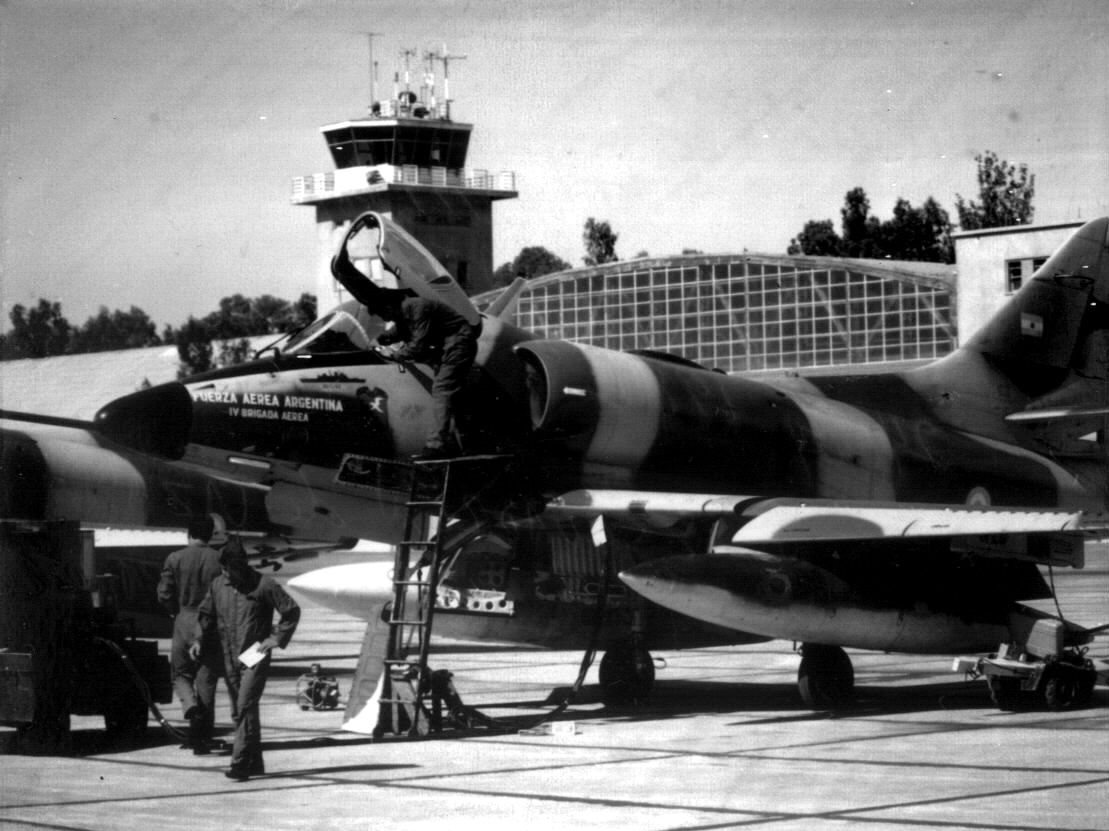
Argentine Air Force Douglas A-4C Skyhawk at El Plumerillo Military Air Base.

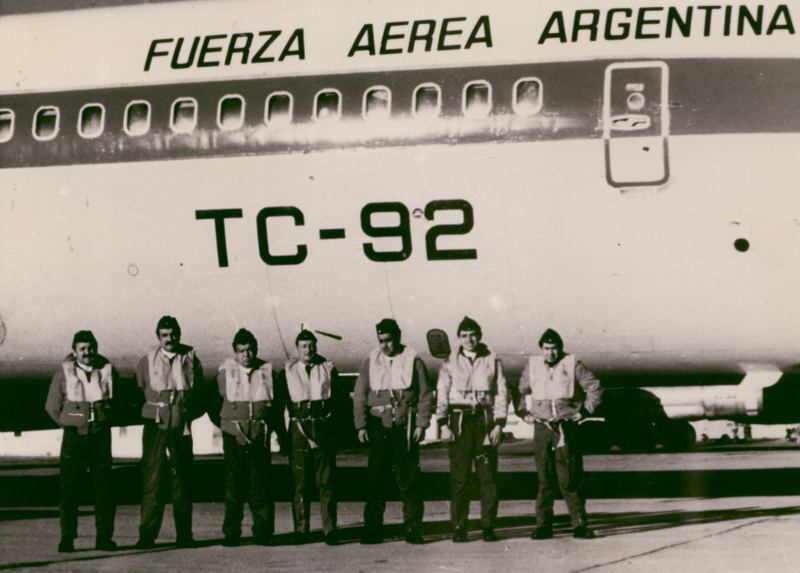
Crew of Argentine Air Force Boeing 707 (TC-92) after surviving an encounter with Sea Dart missiles from HMS Cardiff.

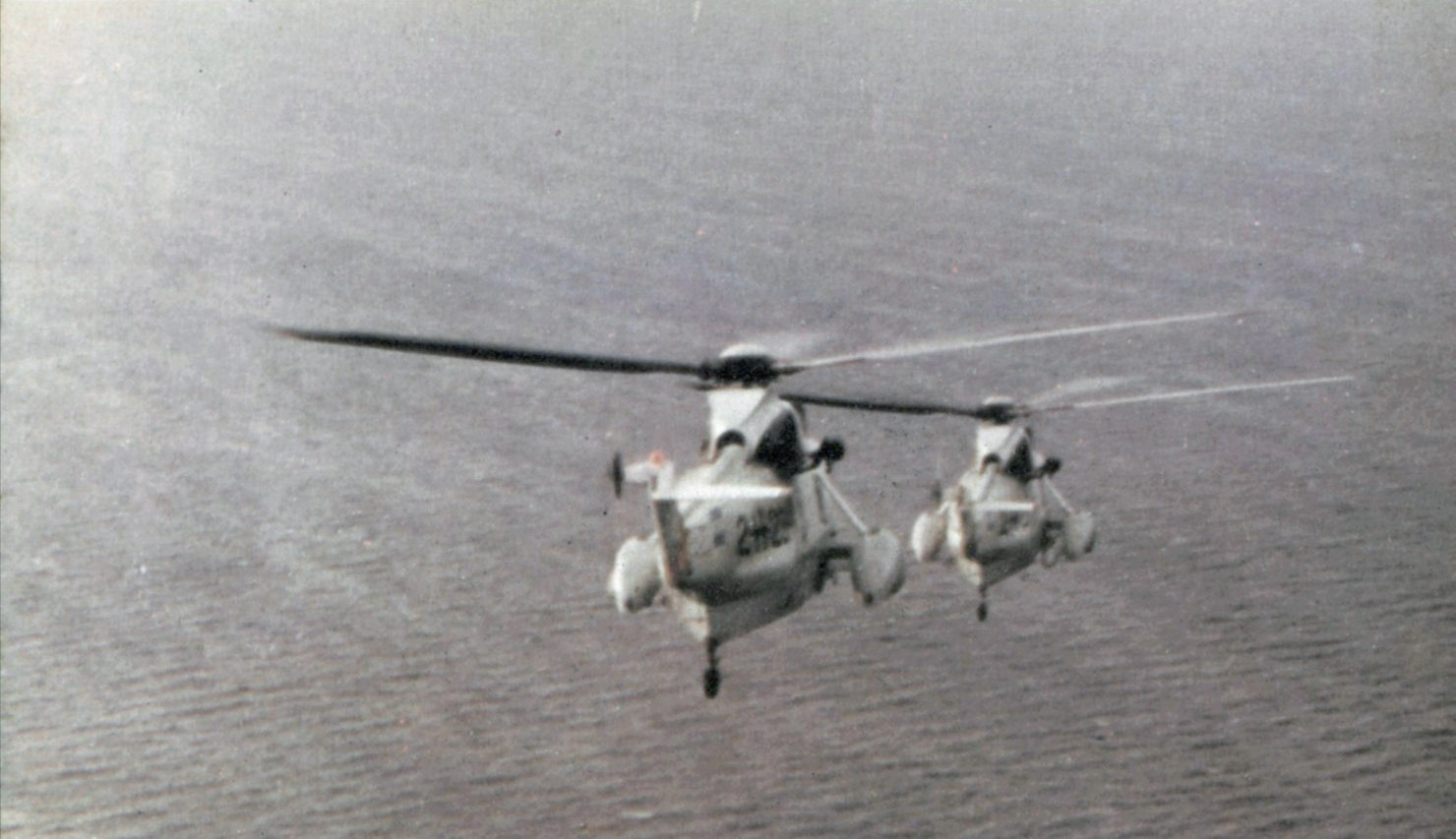
Argentine Naval Aviation Sikorsky SH-3 Sea King helicopters rescuing Argentine forces from Pebble Island following the British SAS Raid on 15 May 1982.

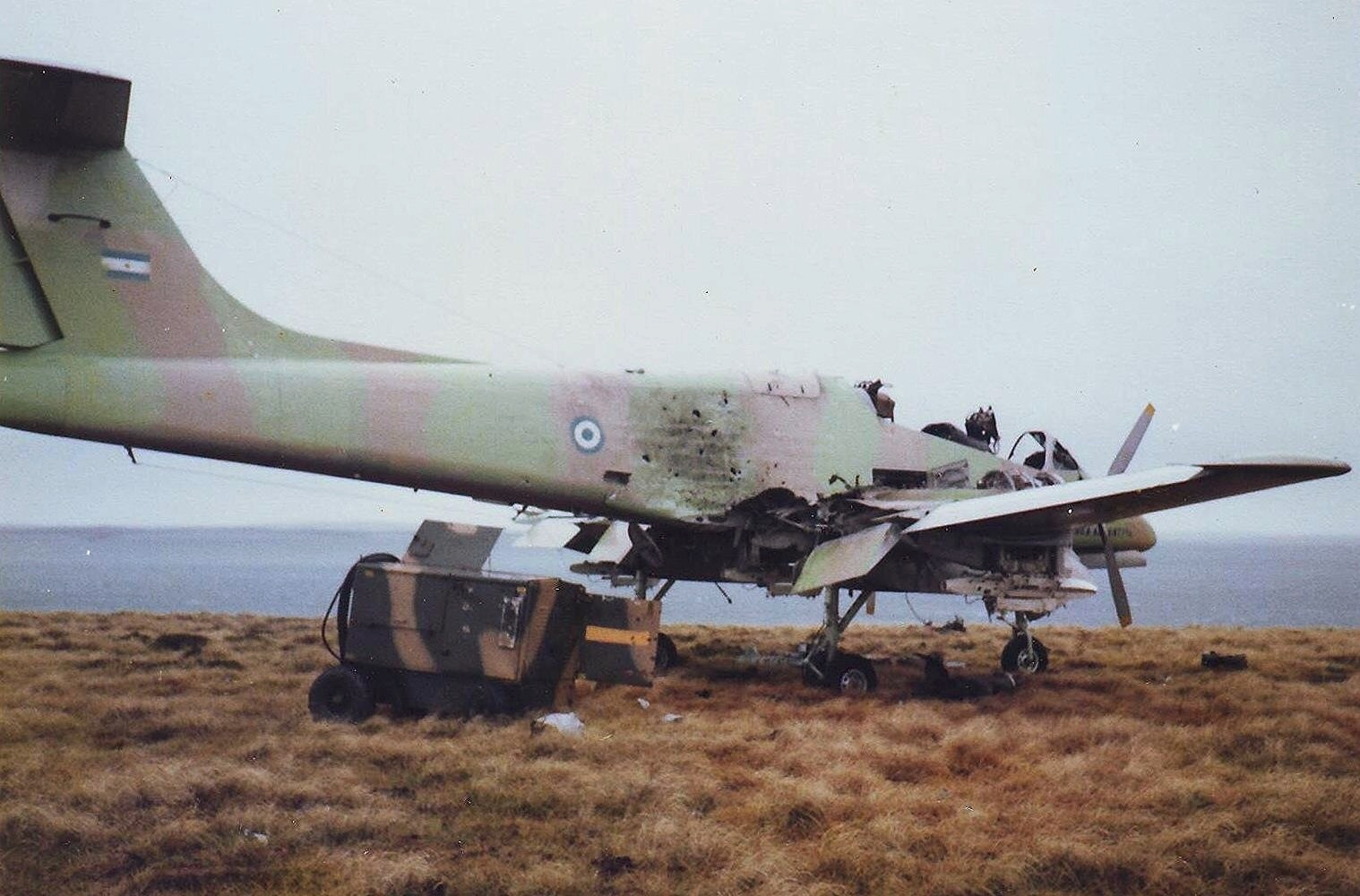
Destroyed FMA IA 58A Pucará on Pebble Island.

==== Combat ====
- A-4B/C/Q Skyhawk (Argentine Air Force, Argentine Naval Aviation)
- Aermacchi MB-326 (Argentine Naval Aviation)
- Aermacchi MB-339 (Argentine Naval Aviation)
- Dassault Mirage III (Argentine Air Force)
- Dassault Super Étendard (Argentine Naval Aviation)
- FMA IA 58A Pucará (Argentine Air Force)
- IAI Dagger (Argentine Air Force)

==== Bomber ====
- Canberra B.62 (Argentine Air Force)

==== Maritime Patrol ====
- S-2E Tracker (Argentine Naval Aviation)
- SP-2H Neptune (Argentine Naval Aviation)

==== Reconnaissance ====
- Cessna Citation I (Phoenix Squadron)
- Cessna Citation II (Phoenix Squadron)
- Hawker Siddeley HS.125 (Phoenix Squadron)
- Learjet 24 (Phoenix Squadron)
- Learjet 35 (Argentine Air Force, Phoenix Squadron)
- Learjet 36 (Phoenix Squadron)
- Lockheed L-188PF Electra (Argentine Naval Aviation)
- P-95 Bandeirulha (Argentine Naval Aviation)
- T-34C Turbo Mentor (Argentine Naval Aviation)
- Boeing 707-320C (Argentine Air Force)

==== Tanker ====
- KC-130H Hercules (Argentine Air Force)

==== Transport ====
- Aero Commander 500B/500S/680FL/690A/690B/690C (Phoenix Squadron)
- BAC 1-11 (Austral Líneas Aéreas)
- Boeing 737-200 (Aerolíneas Argentinas)
- Britten-Norman BN-2 Islander (Argentine Naval Aviation)
- C-47 Skytrain (Phoenix Squadron)
- C-130H Hercules (Argentine Air Force)
- de Havilland Canada DHC-6 Twin Otter (Argentine Air Force)
- Douglas DC-3 (Phoenix Squadron)
- FMA IA 50 Guaraní II (Phoenix Squadron)
- Fokker F-27-400M (Argentine Air Force)
- Fokker F-28-1000C/3000C (Argentine Air Force, Argentine Naval Aviation)
- Mitsubishi MU-2 (Phoenix Squadron)
- Piper Aerostar (Phoenix Squadron)
- Swearingen Merlin (Phoenix Squadron)

==== Helicopters ====
- Agusta A109A (Argentine Army Aviation, Phoenix Squadron)
- Aérospatiale Alouette III (Argentine Naval Aviation)
- Aérospatiale SA 330 Puma (Argentine Army Aviation, Argentine Naval Prefecture)
- Bell 205 (Phoenix Squadron)
- Bell 206 (Phoenix Squadron)
- Bell 212 (Argentine Air Force, Phoenix Squadron)
- CH-47C Chinook (Argentine Army Aviation)
- H-34 Choctaw (Phoenix Squadron)
- McDonnell Douglas MD500 (Phoenix Squadron)
- Messerschmitt-Bölkow-Blohm Bo 105 (Phoenix Squadron)
- SH-3 Sea King (Argentine Naval Aviation, Phoenix Squadron)
- Short SC.7 Skyvan (Argentine Naval Prefecture)
- UH-1H Iroquois (Argentine Army Aviation)
- Westland Lynx Mk.23 (Argentine Naval Aviation)

==== Armament ====
Machine guns and cannons

- 7.62×51mm NATO FN Browning machine gun (FMA IA 58A Pucará)
- 20×110mm USN Hispano-Suiza HS.804 cannon (FMA IA 58A Pucará)
- 20×110mm USN Colt Mk 12 cannon (A-4B/C/Q Skyhawk)
- 30×113mm DEFA cannon (Dassault Mirage III, IAI Dagger)

Rockets

- 127mm Zuni FFAR (Aermacchi MB-339)

Air-to-air missiles

- AIM-9B Sidewinder (A-4Q Skyhawk)
- Rafael Shafrir 2 (A-4C Skyhawk, IAI Dagger)
- R.530 (Dassault Mirage III)
- R.550 Magic (Dassault Mirage III)

Air-to-surface missiles

- Aérospatiale AM.39 Exocet - The Exocet is probably the most famous weapon of the war, sinking two British ships and damaging a third. Operated by both sides the missile was used by the Argentine Navy either air launched from Dassault Super Étendard jets and from an improvised land launcher.

Bombs

- Mk. 82 General Purpose Bomb (A-4Q Skyhawk)
- 1,000 lb General-Purpose Bomb (A-4B/C Skyhawk, IAI Dagger, Canberra B.62)
- 250kg Expal BR/BRP General-Purpose Bomb (A-4B/C Skyhawk, IAI Dagger)
- 125kg PG (FMA IA 58A Pucará)
- Napalm (FMA IA 58A Pucará)

=== United Kingdom ===
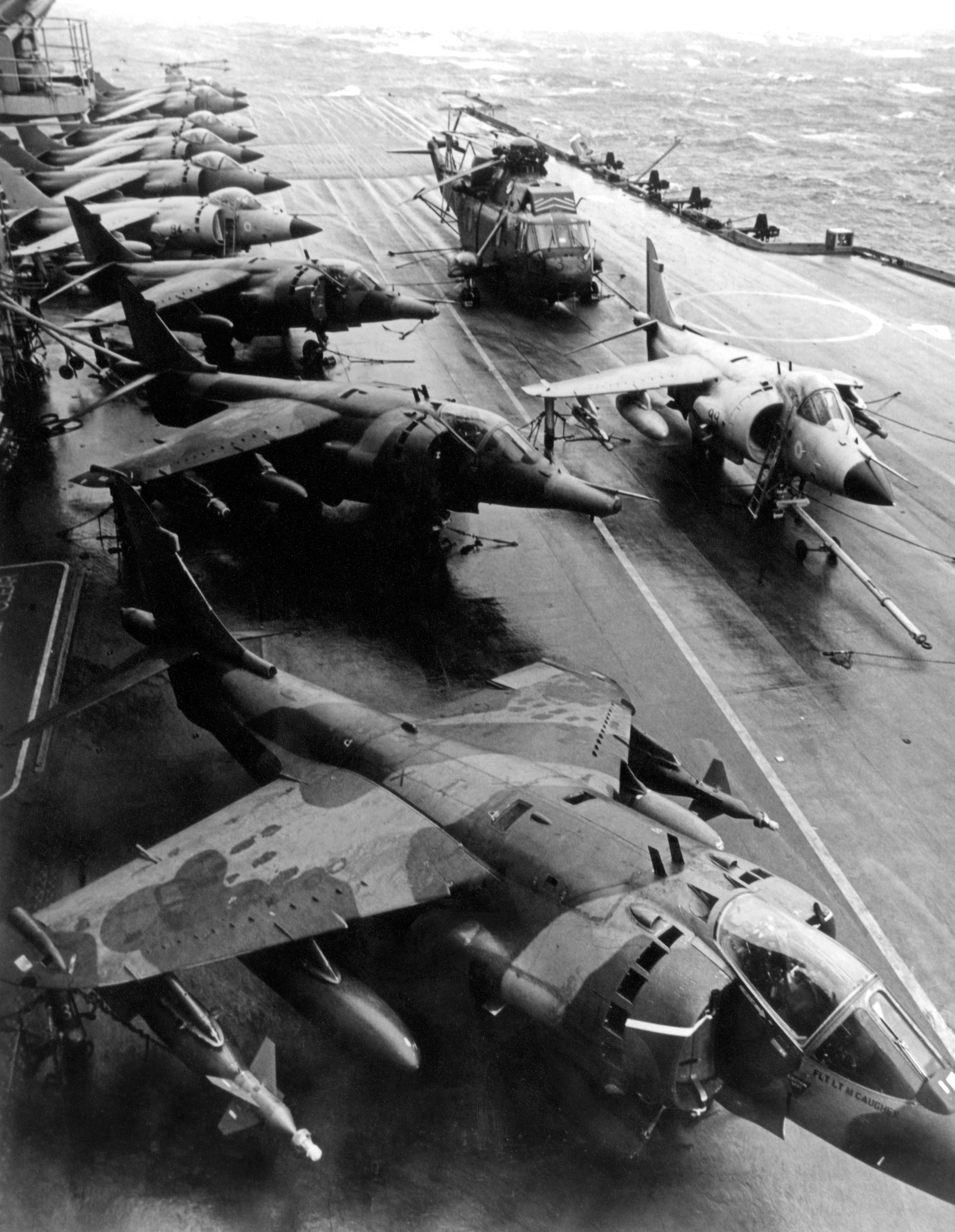
Harriers, Sea Harriers and a Sea King helicopter on the deck of the aircraft carrier HMS Hermes.

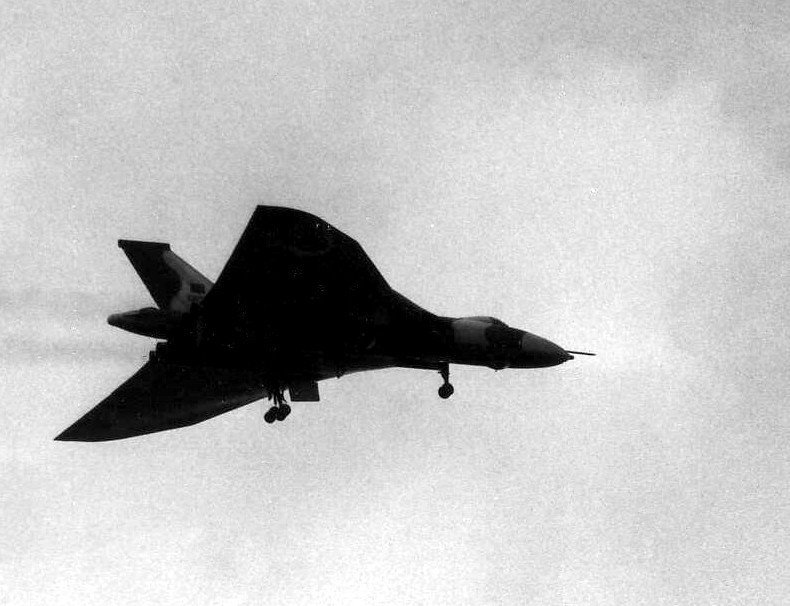
Vulcan bomber making an approach to land at Ascension Island.

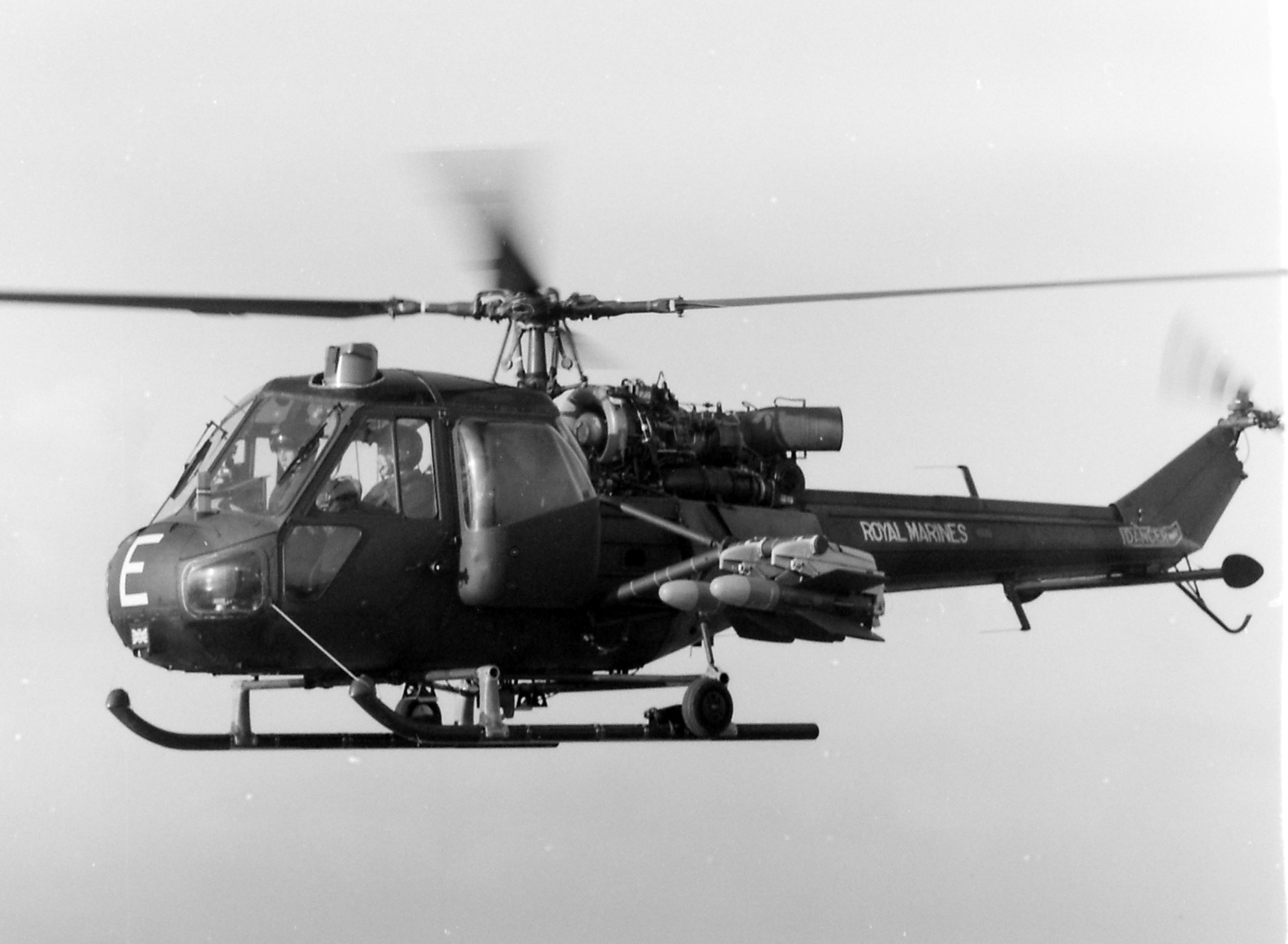
Westland Scout fitted with Nord SS.11 missiles.

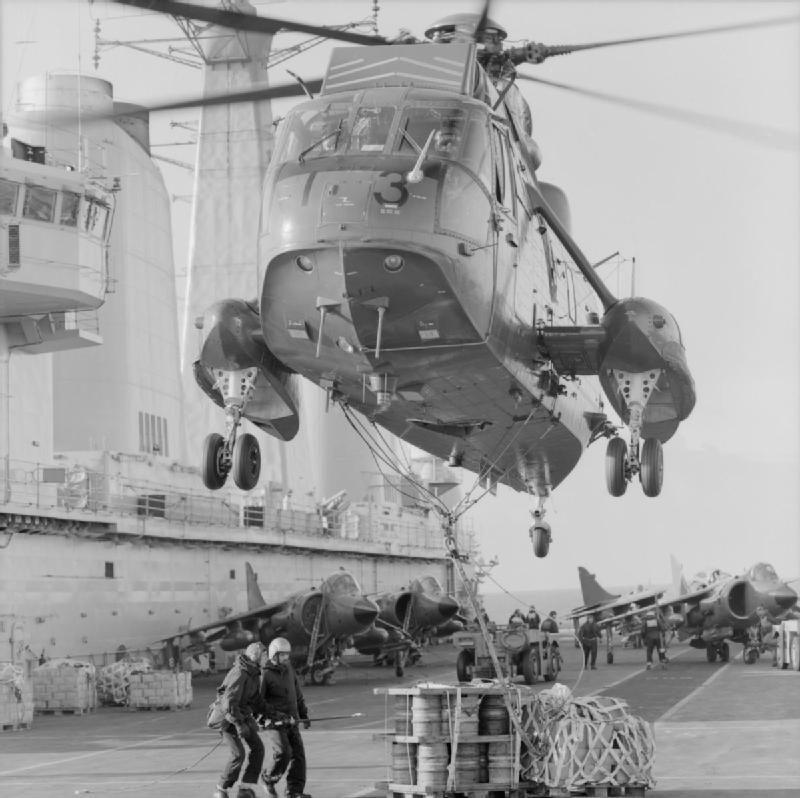
A Sea King helicopter lands a payload on the deck of HMS Invincible.

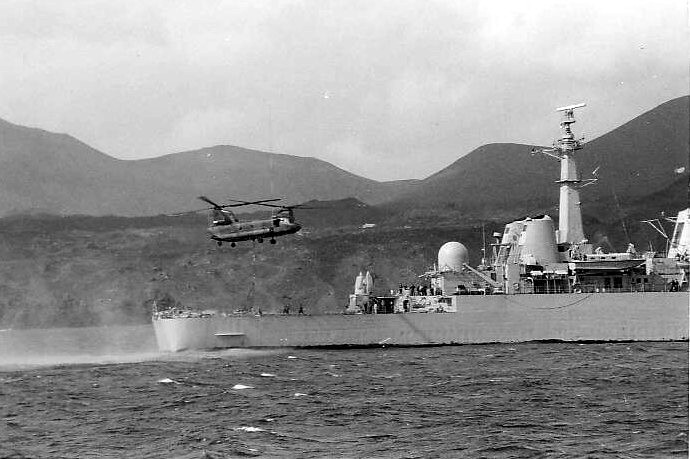
A Chinook helicopter delivers supplies to HMS Bristol near Ascension Island.

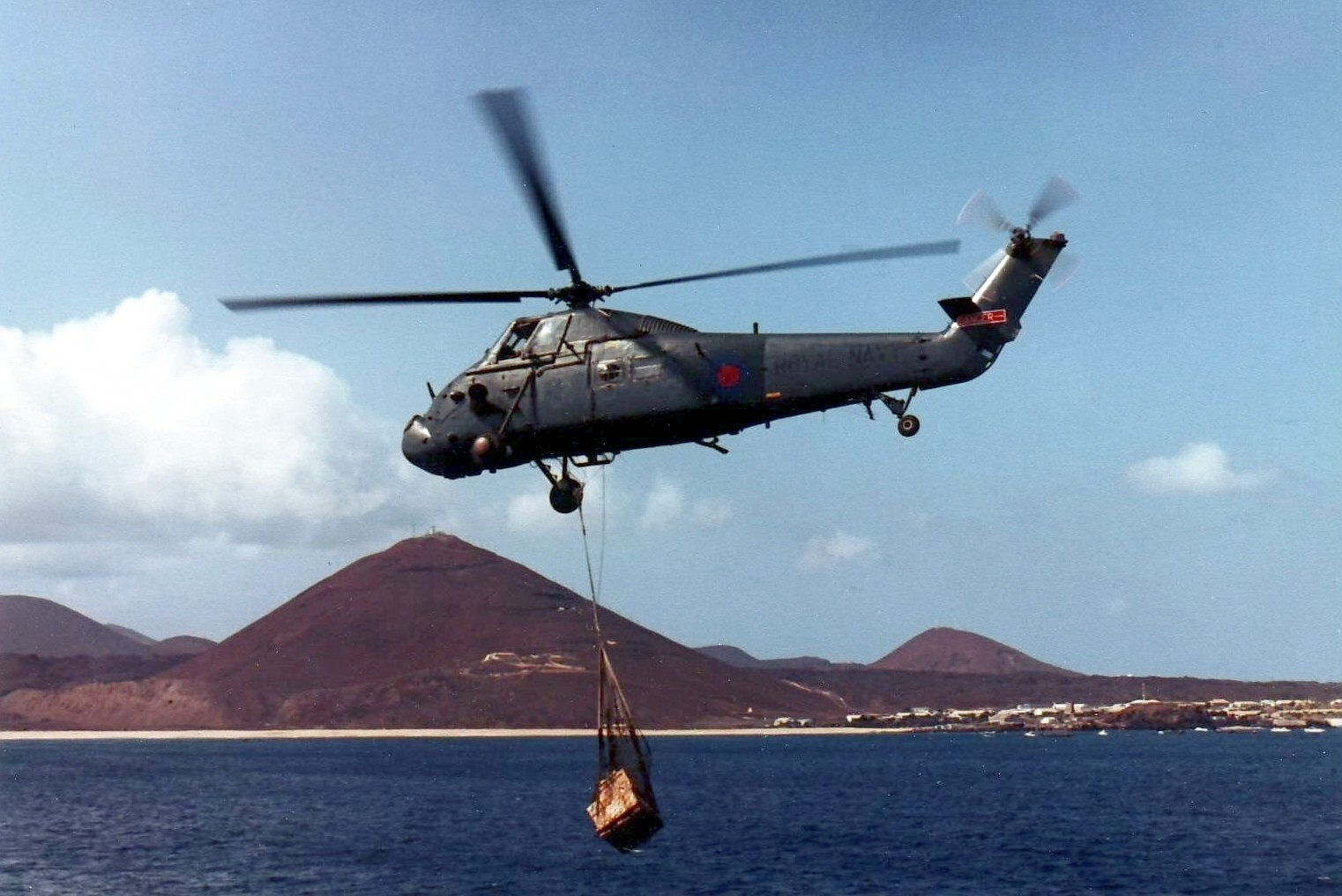
A Westland Wessex helicopter delivering supplies at Ascension Island.

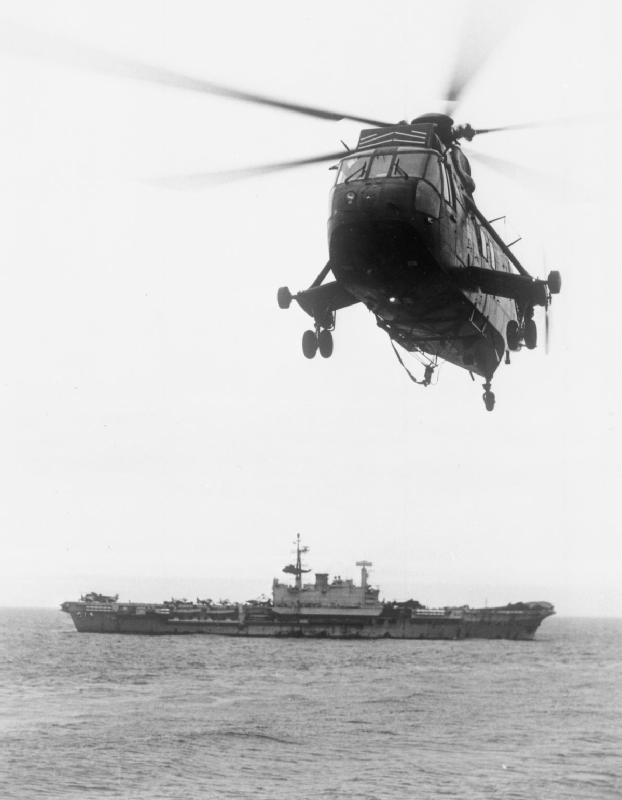
A Westland Sea King HAS.4 helicopter with the aircraft carrier HMS Hermes in the background.

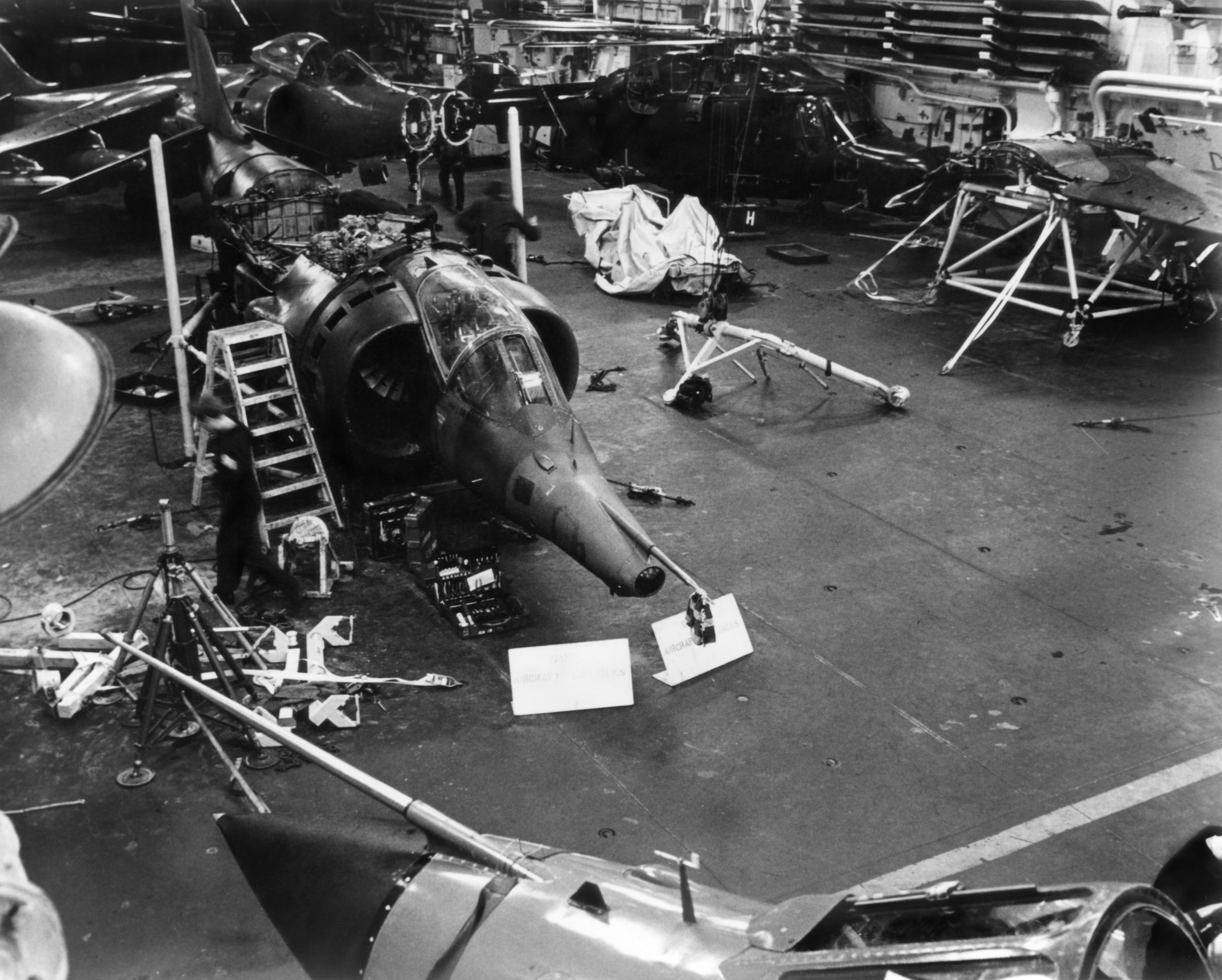
Harrier GR.3 undergoing an engine change in the hangar deck on HMS Hermes. A Fleet Air Arm Lynx is visible at the rear of the hangar.

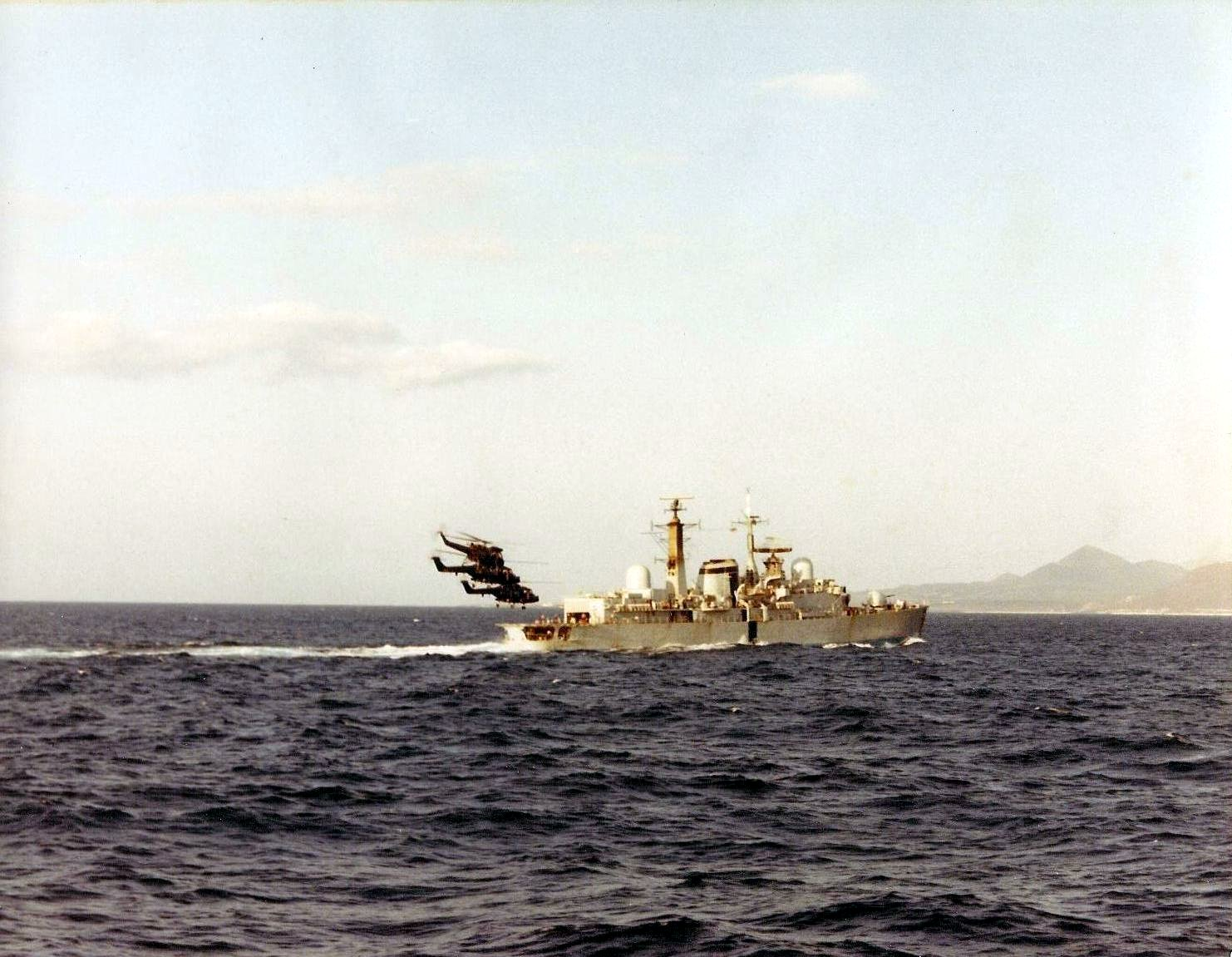
View of HMS Exeter from HMS Cardiff approaching Ascension Island, returning from the Falklands. Two Westland Lynx and a Westland Wasp are visible.

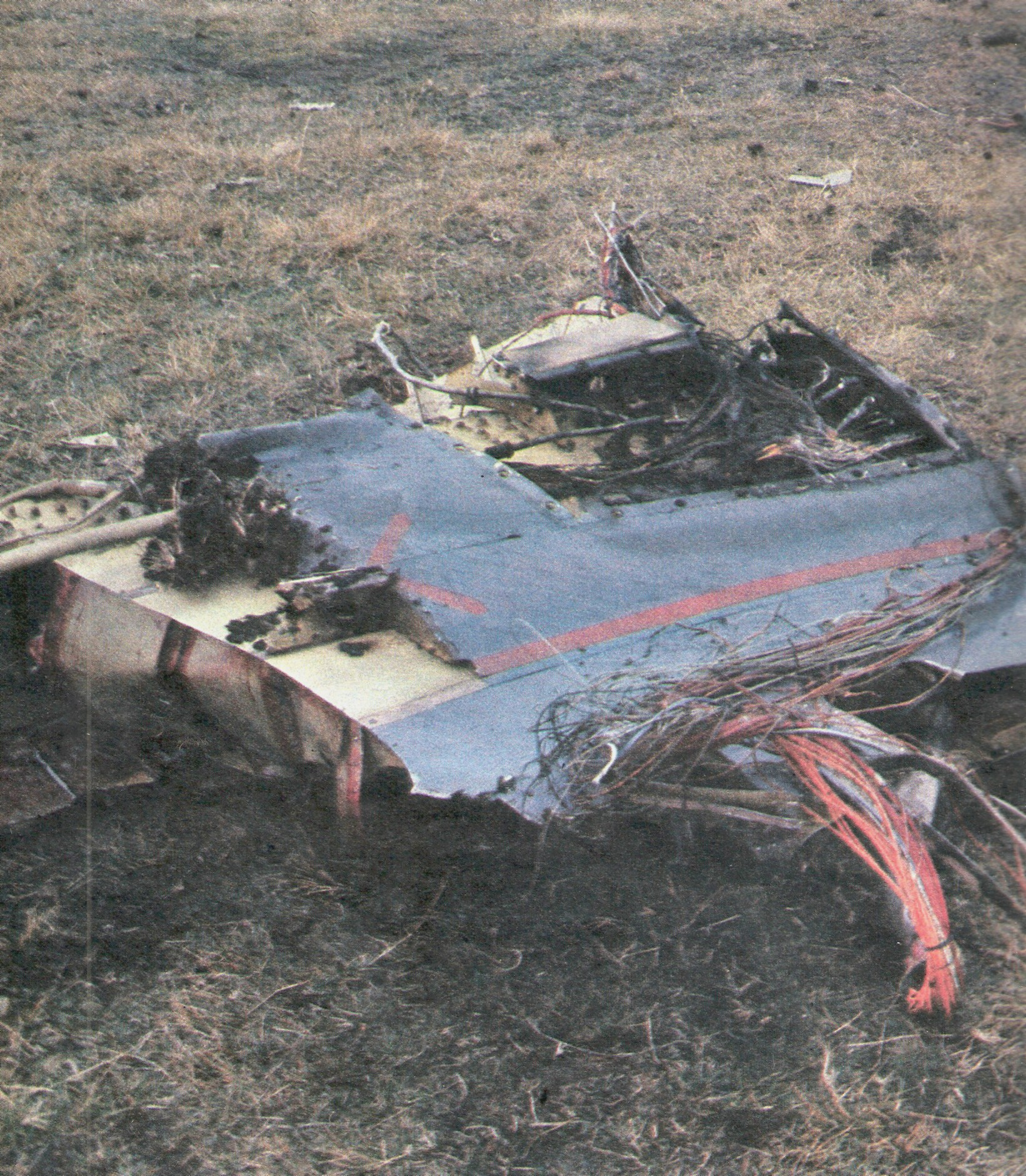
Wreckage of Sea Harrier XZ450, piloted by Lt. Nick Taylor, destroyed by AA fire. XZ450 made the Sea Harrier's maiden flight on 20 August 1978.

==== Combat ====
- Phantom FGR.2 (Royal Air Force)
- Harrier GR.3 (Royal Air Force)
- Sea Harrier FRS.1 (Fleet Air Arm)

==== Bomber ====
- Vulcan B.2 (Royal Air Force)

==== Maritime Patrol ====
- Nimrod MR.2 (Royal Air Force)

==== Reconnaissance ====
- Canberra PR.9 (Royal Air Force)

==== Tanker ====
- Victor K.2 (Royal Air Force)

==== Transport ====
- Hercules C.1 (Royal Air Force)
- VC10 C.1 (Royal Air Force)
- Short Belfast (TAC HeavyLift)

==== Helicopters ====
- Gazelle AH.1 (Army Air Corps, Royal Marines Aviation)
- Scout AH.1 (Army Air Corps, Royal Marines Aviation)
- Wessex HAS.3/HU.5 (Fleet Air Arm)
- Lynx HAS.2/HAS.3 (Fleet Air Arm)
- Sea King HAS.2/HAS.2A/HAS.5/HAR.3 (Fleet Air Arm/Royal Air Force)
- Wasp HAS.1 (Fleet Air Arm)
- Chinook HC.1 (Royal Air Force)

==== Armament ====
Guns and cannons

- L44A1 GPMG (Scout, Lynx, Sea King, Wasp)
- M60 machine gun (Chinook)
- 30×111mm ADEN cannon (Harrier, Sea Harrier)
- M134 Minigun (Chinook)

Rockets

- SNEB (Harrier, Sea Harrier, Gazelle)

Air-to-air missiles

- AIM-9D/G Sidewinder (Phantom)
- AIM-9L Sidewinder (Harrier, Sea Harrier, Nimrod)

Air-to-surface missiles

- AGM-45 Shrike (Vulcan)
- BAe Sea Skua (Lynx) - A light anti-ship missile, fired from Lynx helicopters, its warhead is only 20 kg compared with the Exocet's 165 kg. However, hits from three Sea Skua missiles badly damaged the Argentine tug ARA Alferez Sobral.
- Nord SS.11 (Scout)
- Nord AS.12 (Wasp, Wessex) - A French light anti-ship missile, fired from Westland Wasp helicopters. Like the Sea Skua, its small 28 kg warhead meant that it could not destroy ships outright; however, it could disable smaller vessels. On 25 April 1982 it contributed towards damaging and disabling the Argentine Submarine the ARA Santa Fe. A total of nine missiles were fired at the submarine trapped on the surface by anti-submarine torpedoes circling just under the hull. Of the missiles fired four hit, four missed and one failed to launch. Two of the missiles that hit the target failed to detonate on impact, instead punching a hole through the slender conning tower and exploding on the far side.

Bombs

- GBU-48 Enhanced Paveway II (Harrier)
- BL755 (Sea Harrier, Nimrod)
- 1,000 lb General-Purpose Bomb (Vulcan, Harrier, Sea Harrier)

Torpedoes and Depth Charges

- Mk. 46 torpedo (Nimrod, Sea King, Wasp)
- Mk. 11 depth charge (Nimrod, Sea King)

== Ships ==
=== Argentina ===
==== Argentine Navy ====
===== Submarines =====
- Balao-class submarine (ARA Santa Fe)
- Type 209 submarine (ARA San Luis)

===== Aircraft carriers =====
- 1942 Design Royal Navy Light Fleet Carrier [Colossus-class] (ARA Veinticinco de Mayo)

===== Amphibious warfare ships =====
- ARA Cabo San Antonio

===== Cruisers =====
- Brooklyn-class cruiser (ARA General Belgrano)

===== Destroyers =====
- Gearing-class destroyer (ARA Comodoro Py)
- Allen M. Sumner-class destroyer (ARA Comodoro Seguí, ARA Hipólito Bouchard, ARA Piedrabuena)
- Type 42 destroyer (ARA Santísima Trinidad, ARA Hércules)

===== Corvettes =====
- Drummond-class corvette (ARA Drummond, ARA Guerrico, ARA Granville)

===== Tugboats =====
- Sotoyomo-class tugboat (ARA Alferez Sobral, ARA Comodoro Somellera)
- Abnaki-class tugboat (ARA Francisco de Gurruchaga)

===== Auxiliary ships =====
- ARA Punta Médanos
- ARA Almirante Irízar
- ARA Isla de los Estados
- ARA Bahía Paraíso
- Bahía Aguirre-class (ARA Bahía Buen Suceso)
- Klickitat-class tanker (ARA Punta Delgada)

==== Argentine Coast Guard ====
===== Patrol vessels =====
- Z-28 naval patrol craft (GC Islas Malvinas, GC Río Iguazú)

==== Merchant vessels ====
- Formosa
- Río Carcarañá
- Yehuín
- Río Cincel
- Mar del Norte
- Lago Argentino
- Puerto Rosales
- Narwal
- María Alejandra
- Constanza
- Invierno
- Capitán Canepa
- María Luisa
- Usurbil
- Mar Azul
- Río de la Plata II

==== Falklands ships seized by the Argentine Navy ====
===== Falklands Government ship =====
- ARA Forrest

===== Falkland Islands Company ships =====
- ARA Monsunen
- ARA Penelope

=== United Kingdom ===
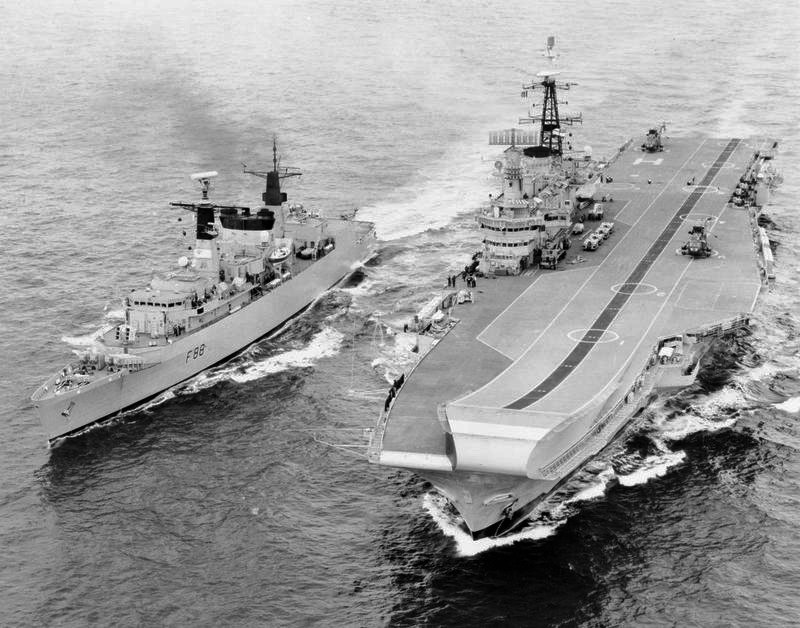
HMS Broadsword alongside HMS Hermes on 1 April 1982.

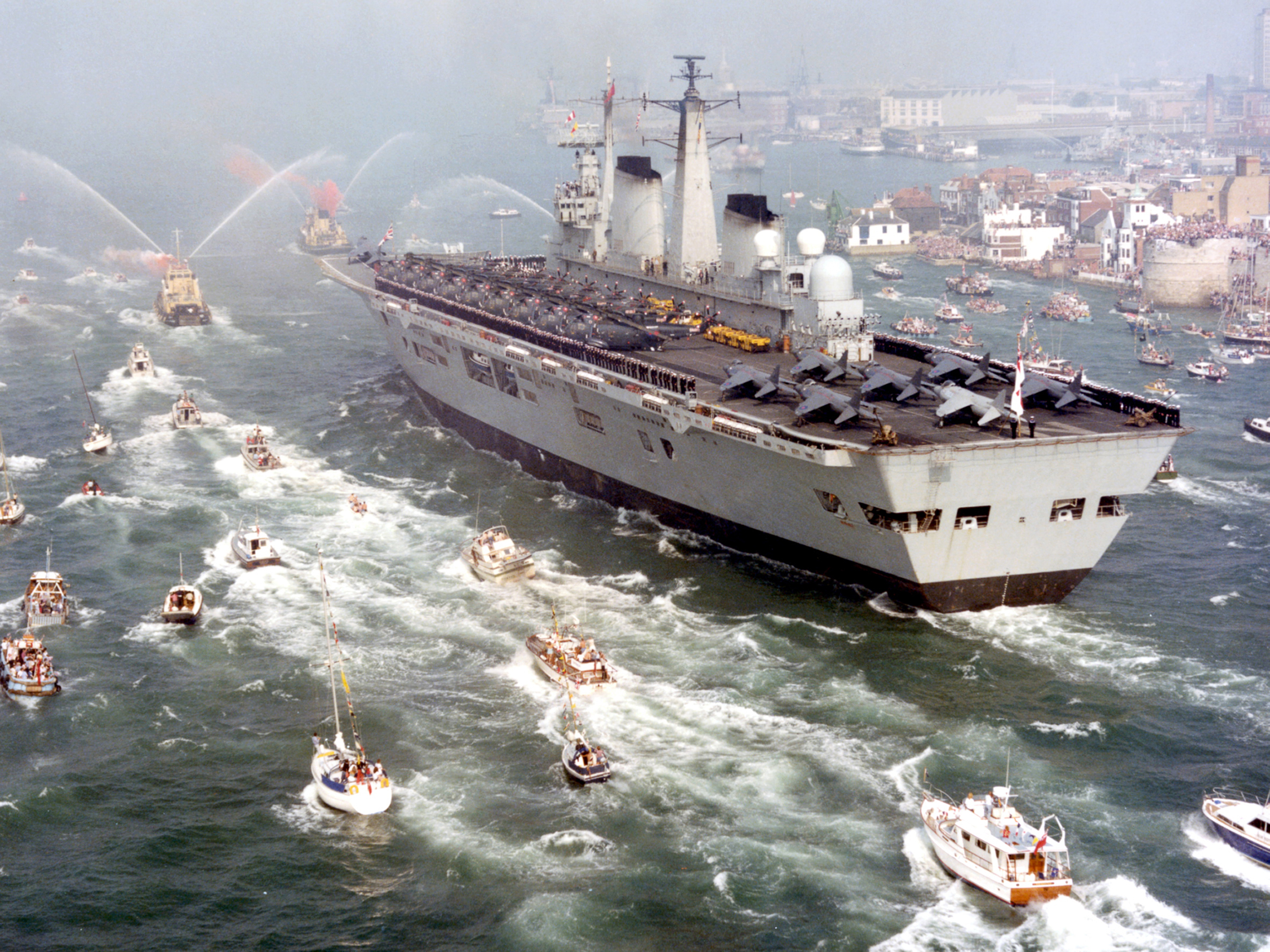
HMS Invincible returns to Portsmouth following the end of hostilities. Lined up on deck are Sea King helicopters from 820 Naval Air Squadron and Sea Harrier aircraft from 800 Naval Air Squadron.

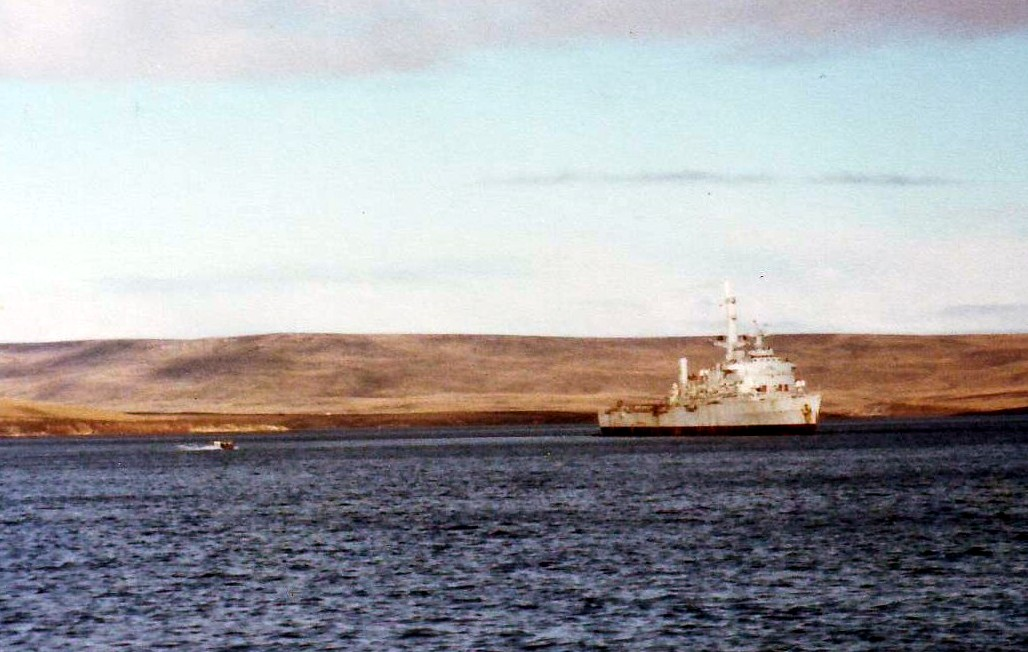
HMS Fearless in San Carlos Water.

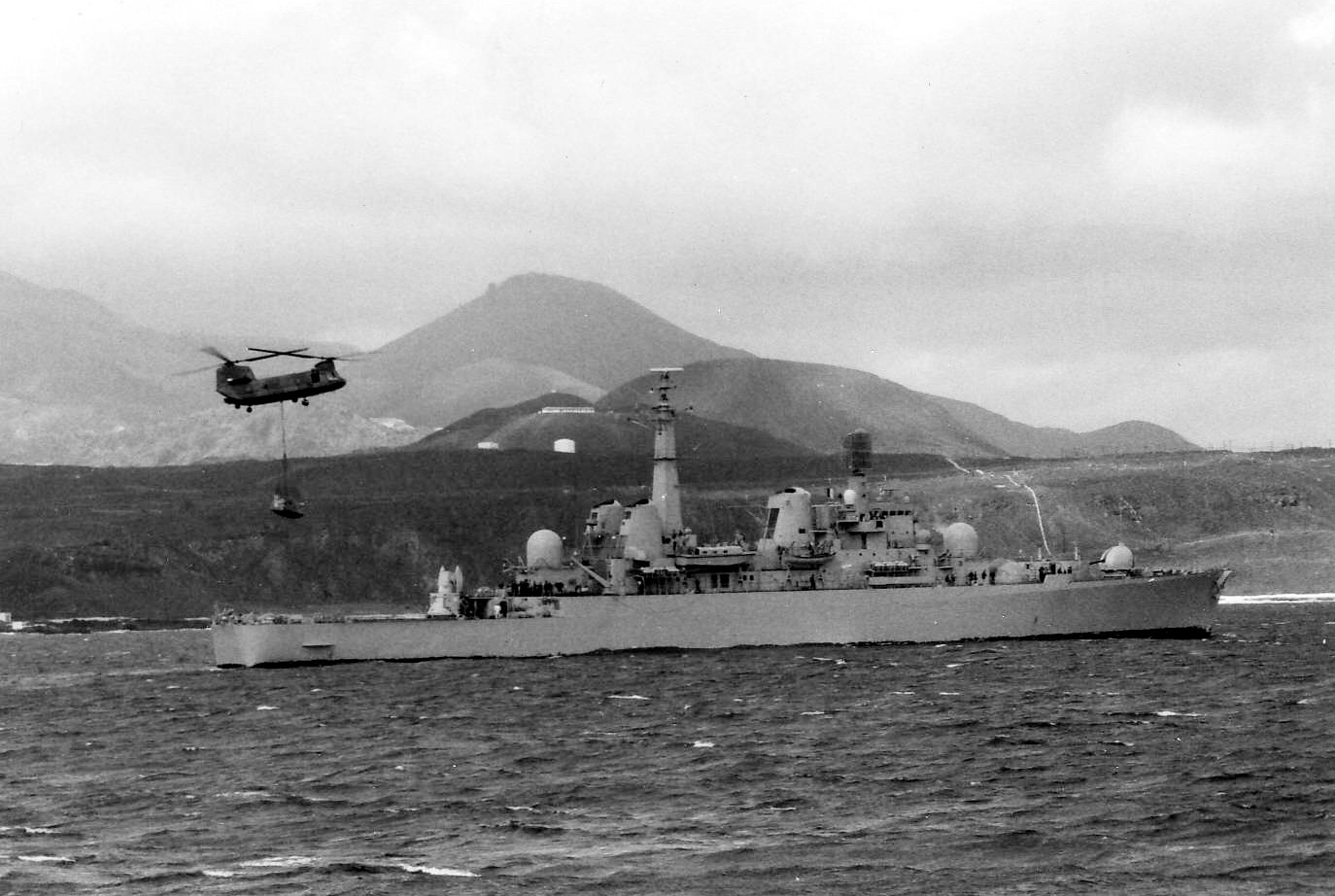
HMS Bristol taking on supplies at Ascension Island.

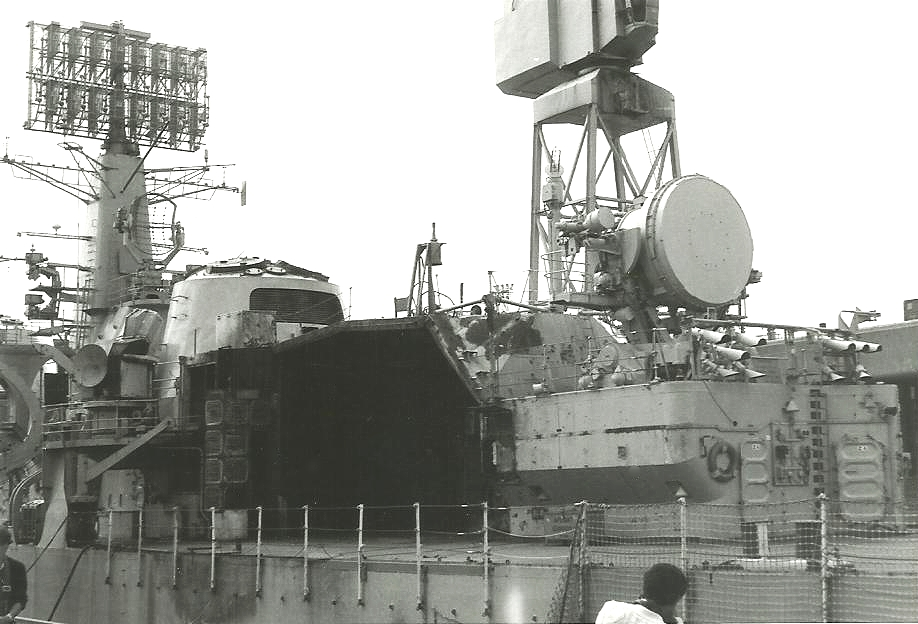
The damage to the aft superstructure and hangar of HMS Glamorgan was caused by a direct hit from an Exocet missile.

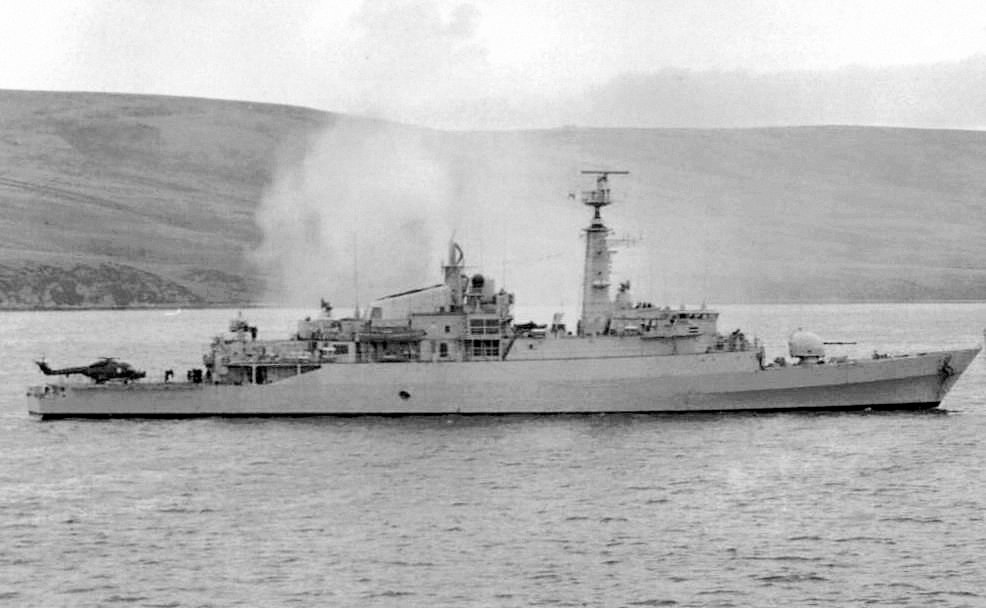
HMS Antelope in San Carlos Water.

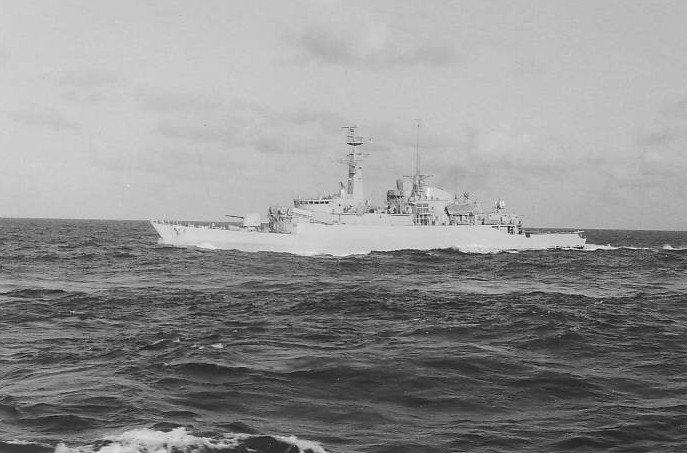
HMS Avenger as part of the Bristol Group.

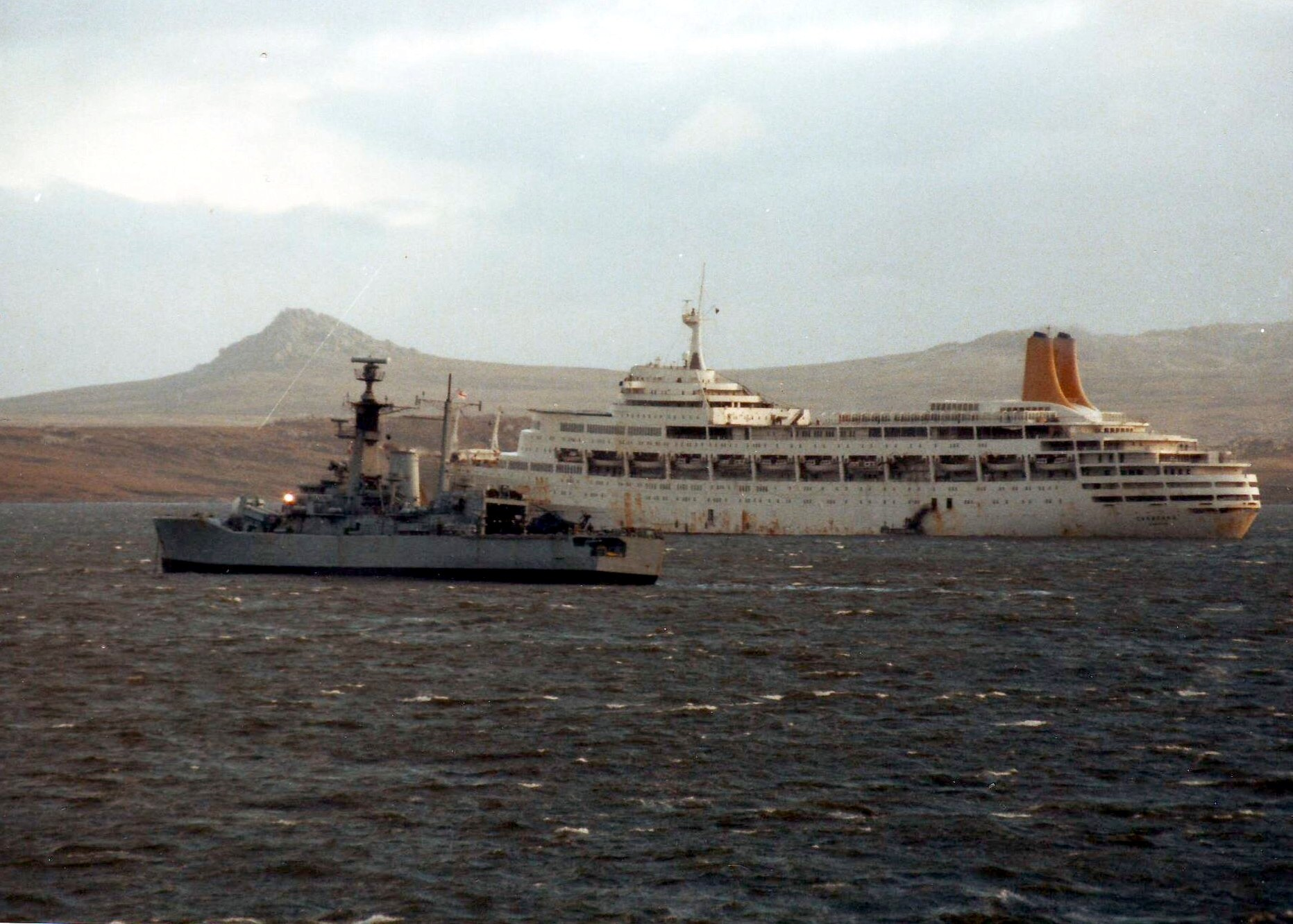
SS Canberra and HMS Andromeda in the vicinity of Port Stanley.

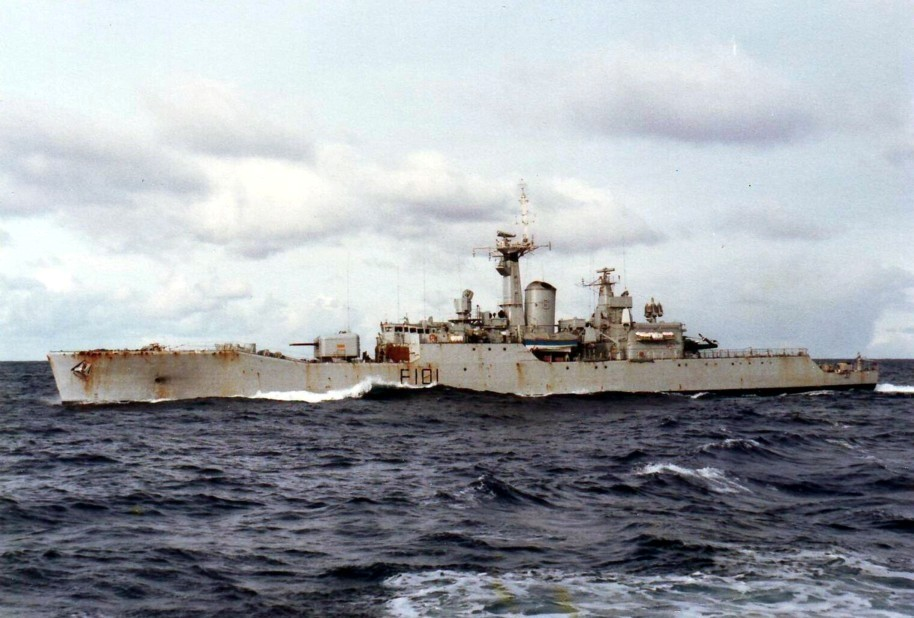
HMS Yarmouth underway on 5 June 1982. Her unofficial nickname was "The Crazy Y".

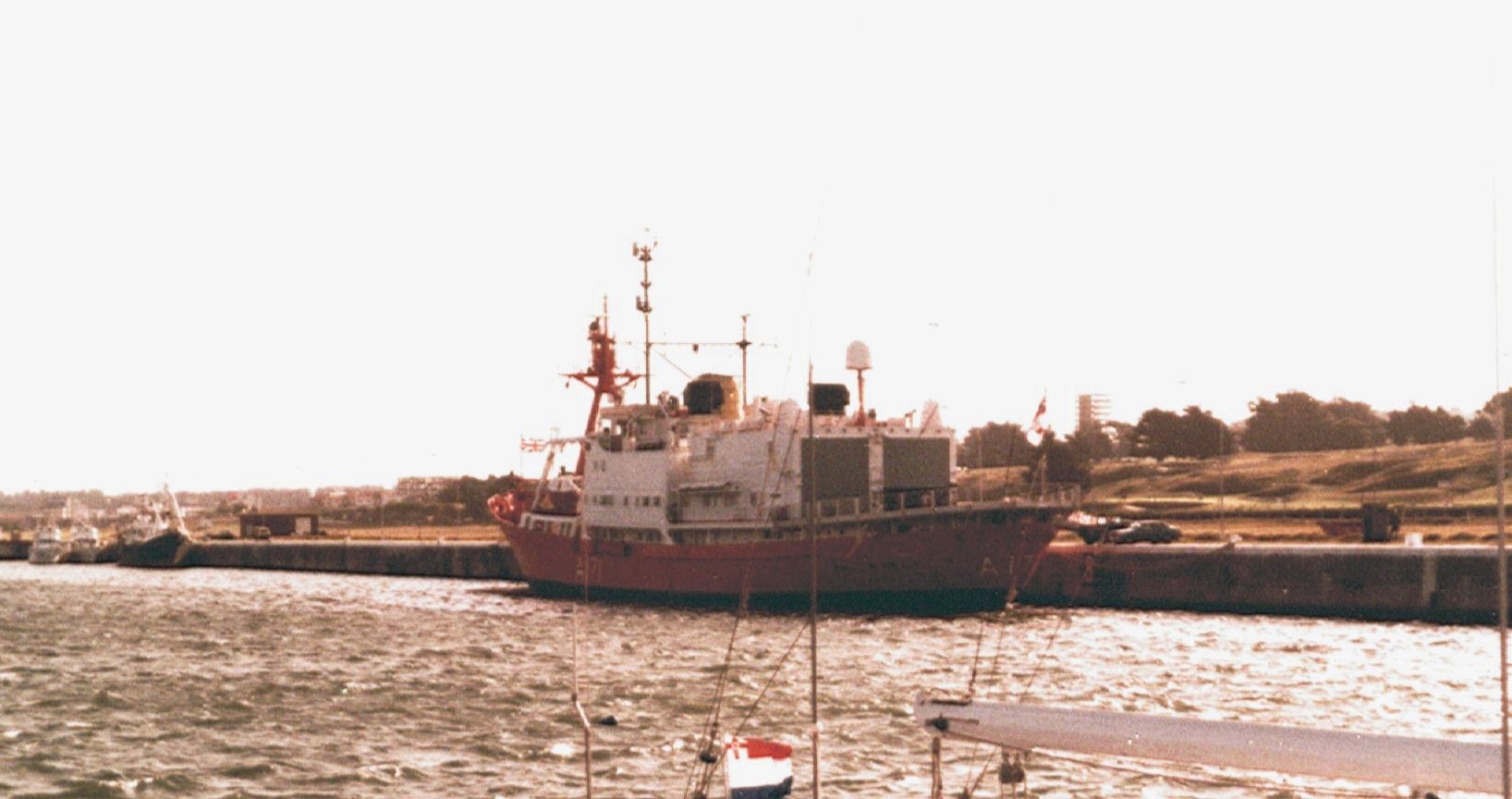
HMS Endurance at Mar Del Plata Naval Base in Argentina, just weeks prior to the start of hostilities.

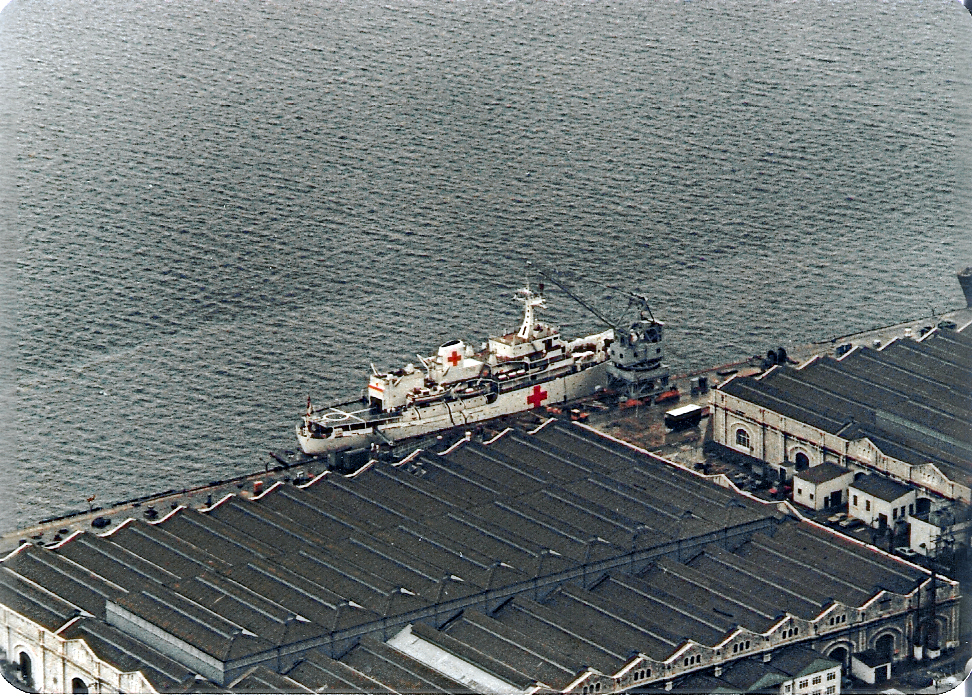
HMS Hecla in Gibraltar after conversion to an ambulance ship.

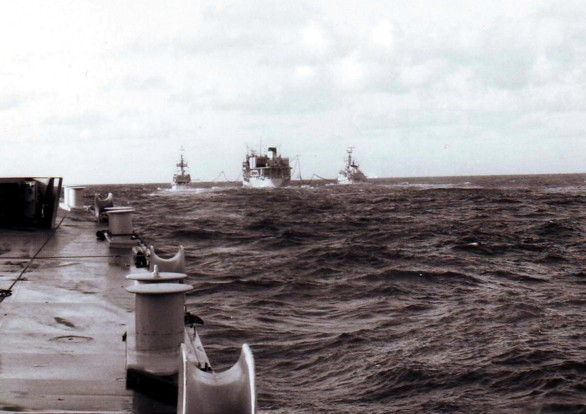
RFA Olna refueling frigates.

RFA Sir Lancelot in San Carlos Water.

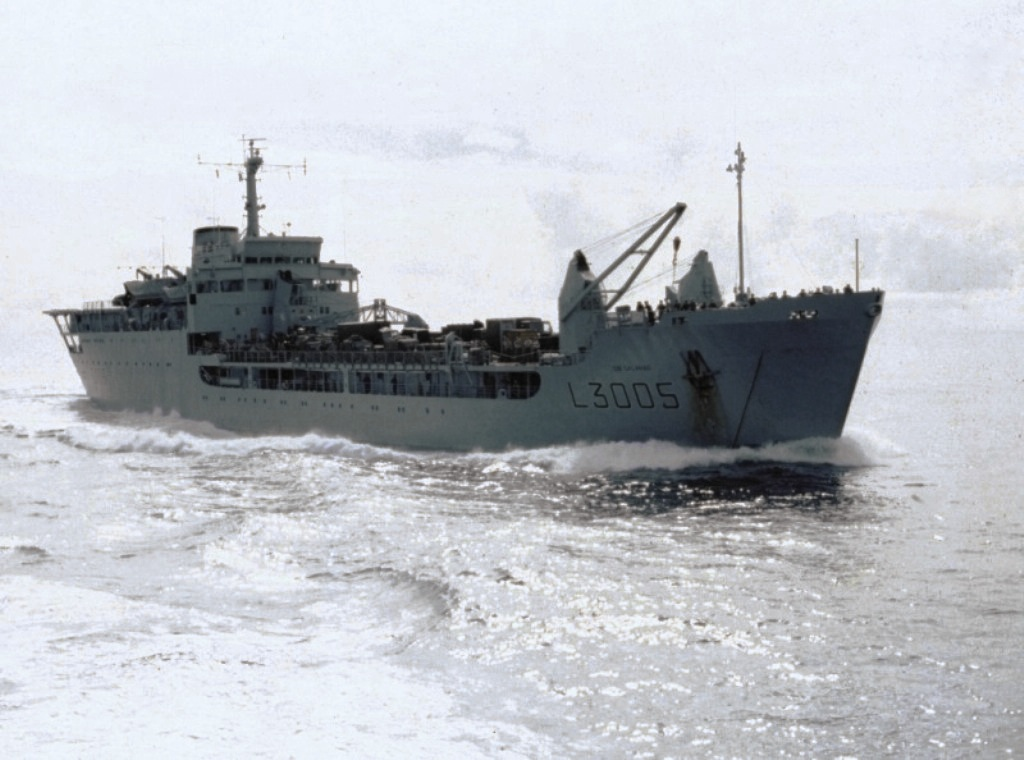
RFA Sir Galahad heading south.

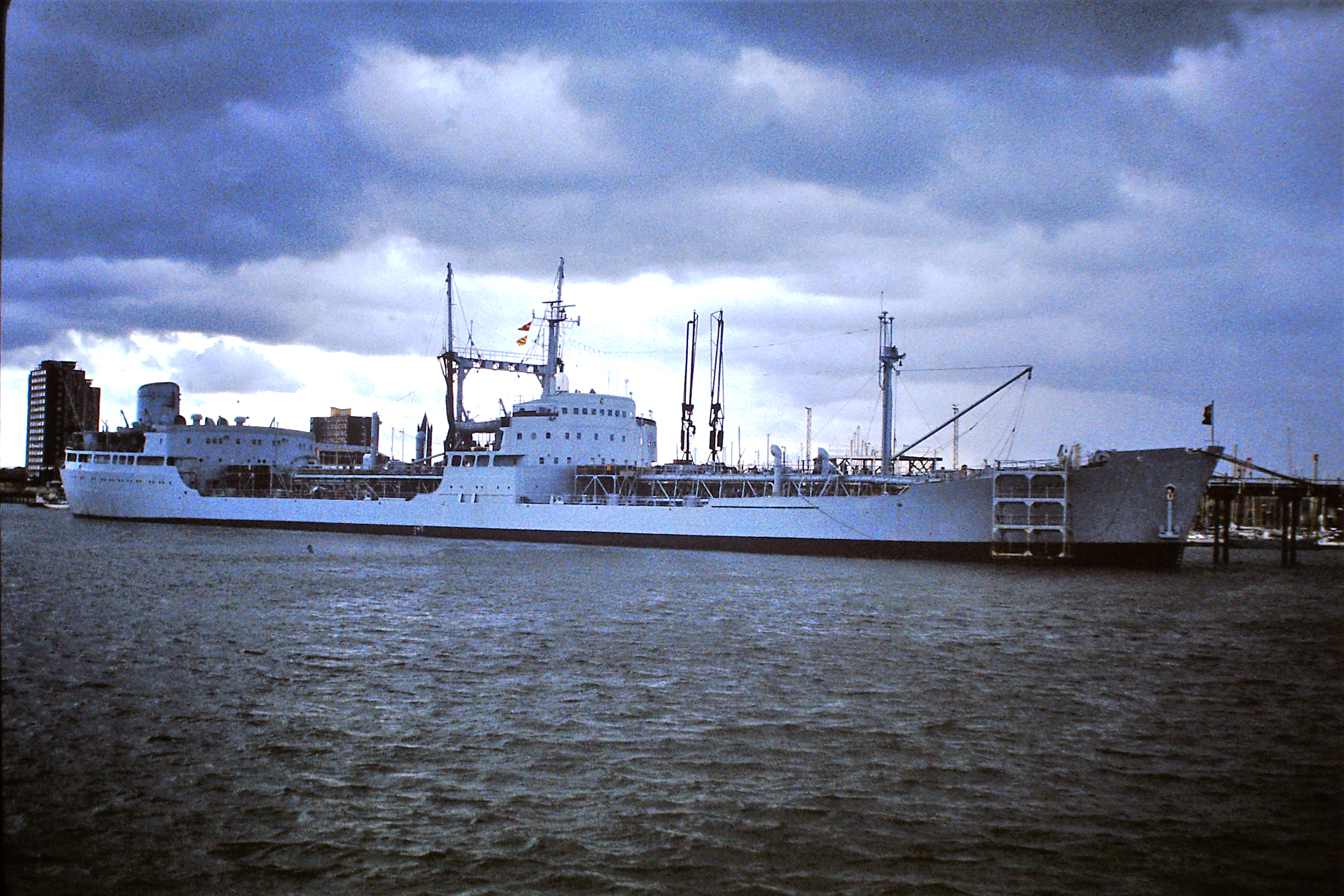
RFA Pearleaf in Portsmouth following the end of hostilities.

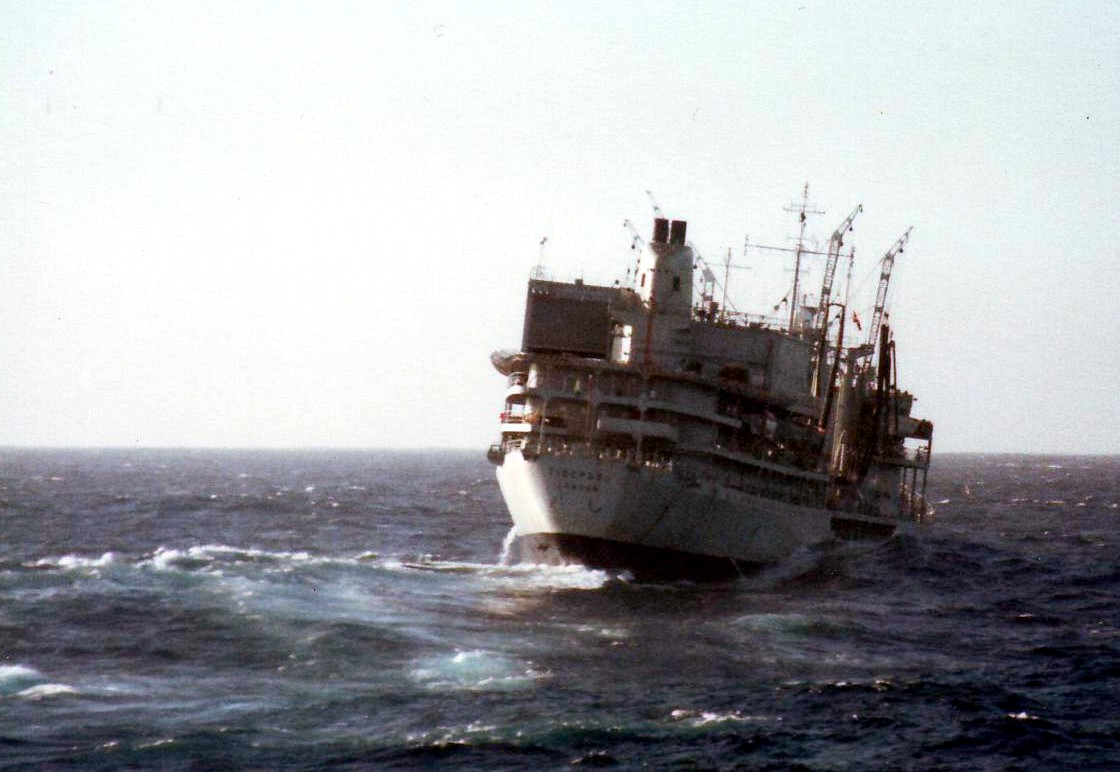
RFA Tidepool in the Total Exclusion Zone.

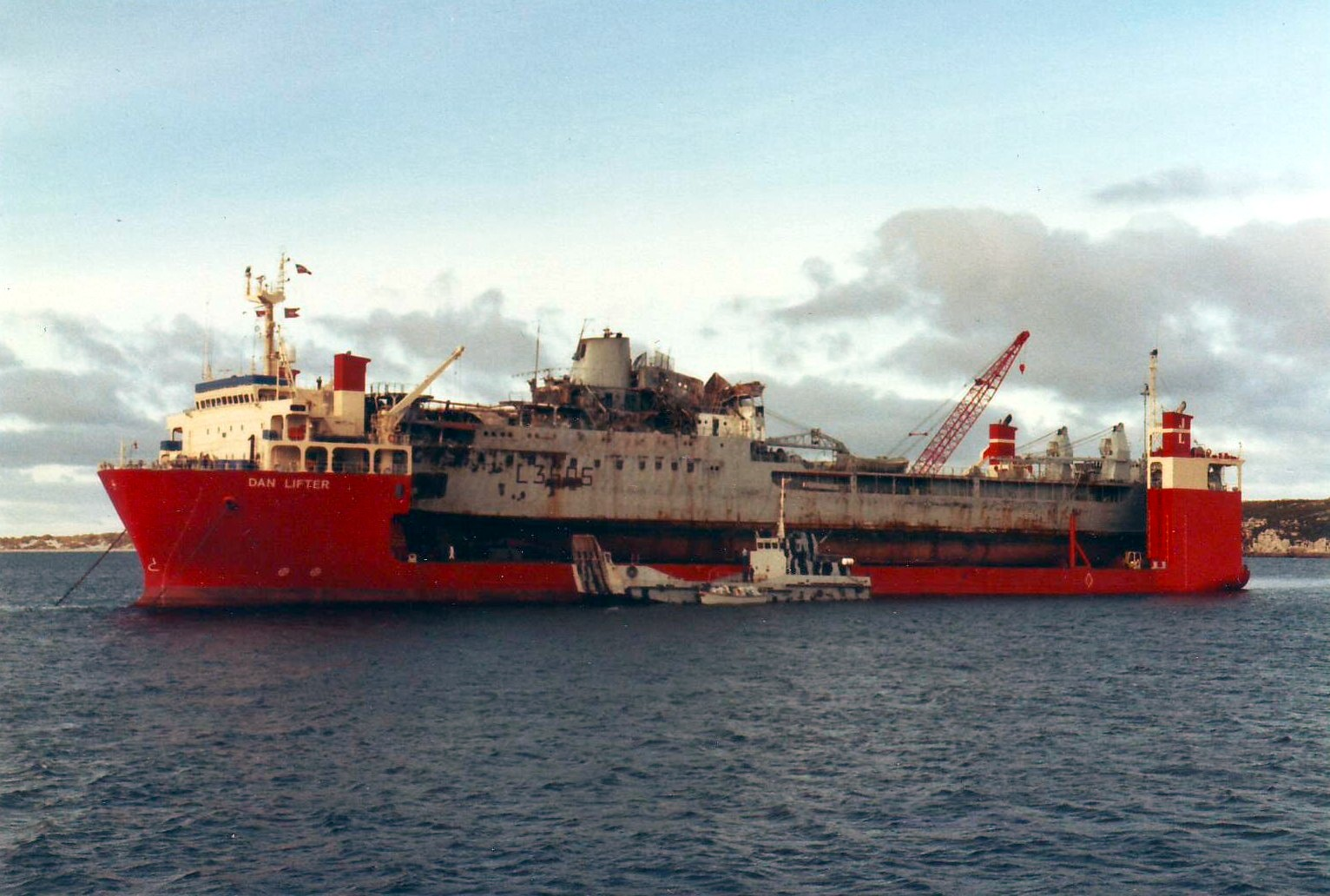
The damaged RFA Sir Tristram being transported home by the heavy-lift ship MV Dan Lifter.

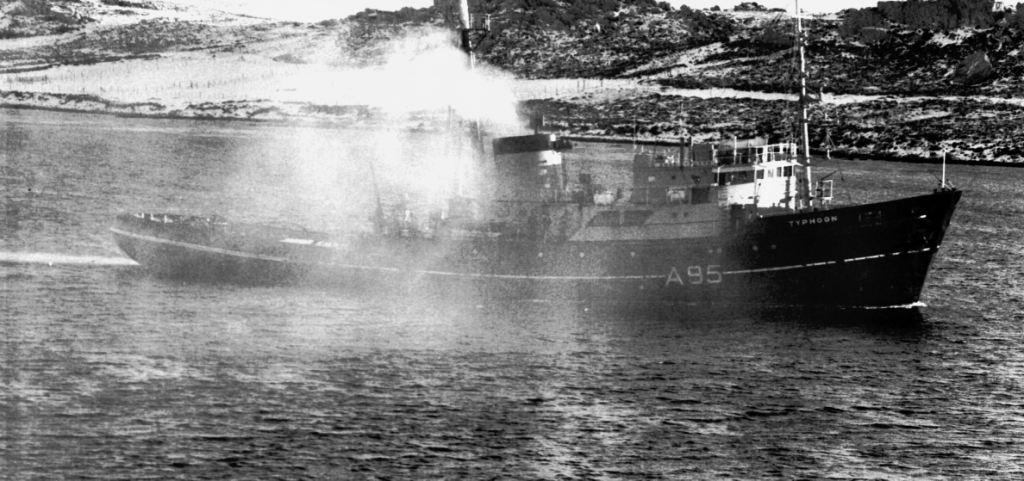
RMAS Typhoon in Port Stanley.

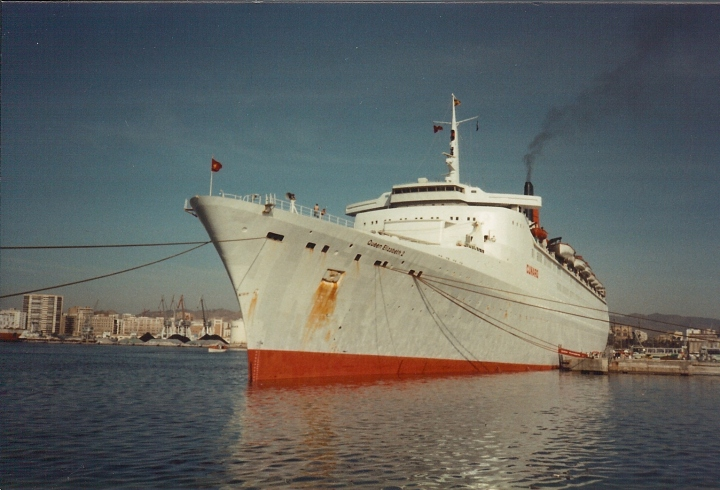
MV Queen Elizabeth 2 shortly after her return from service in the Falklands.

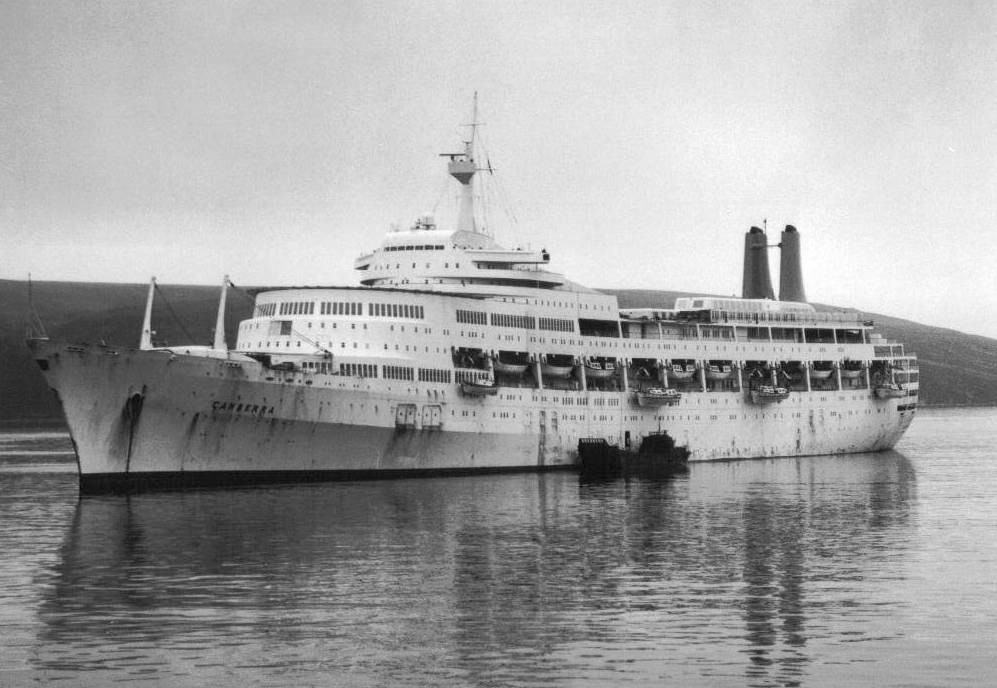
SS Canberra in San Carlos Water.

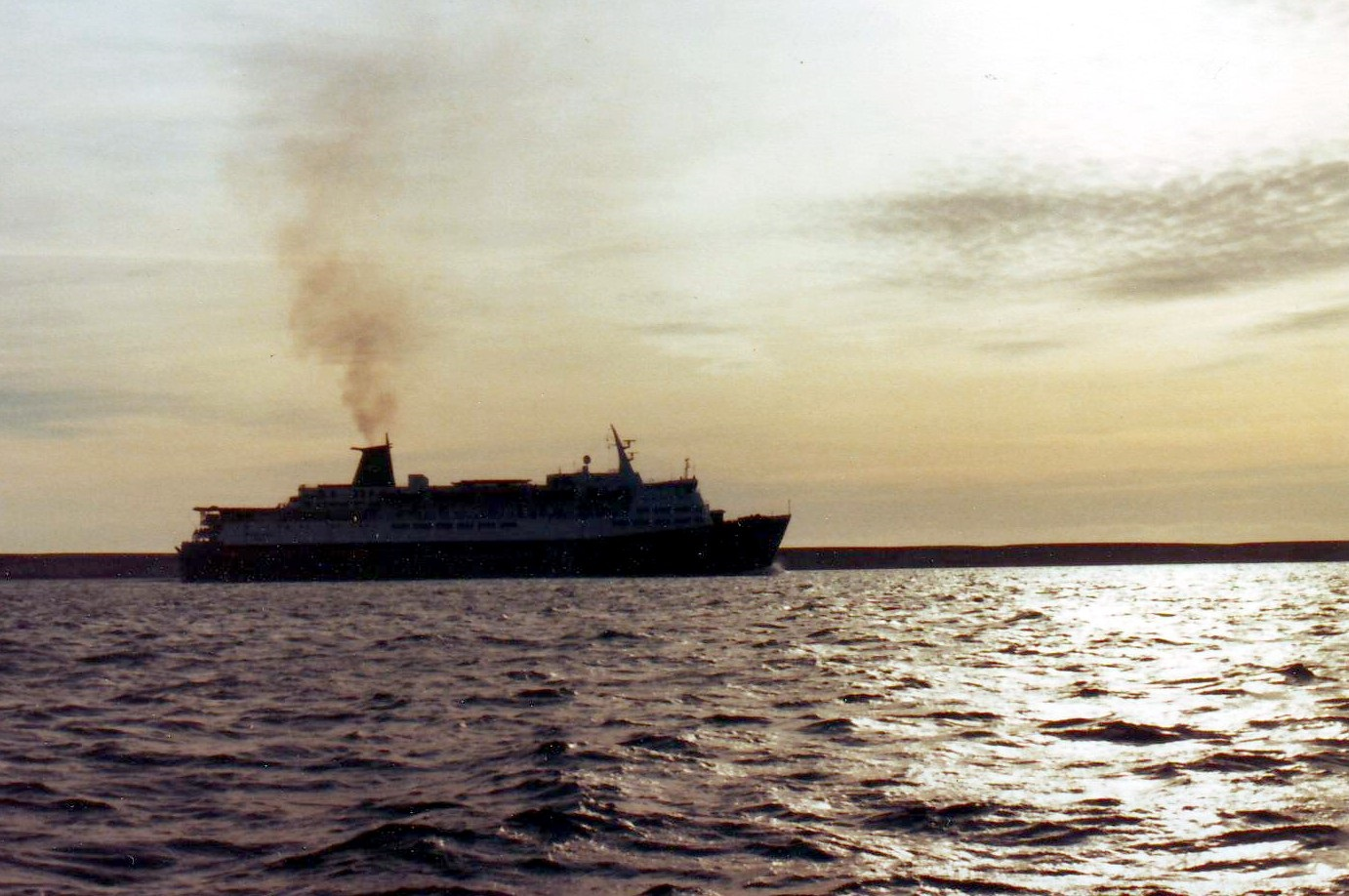
MV Norland repatriating troops at the end of hostilities.

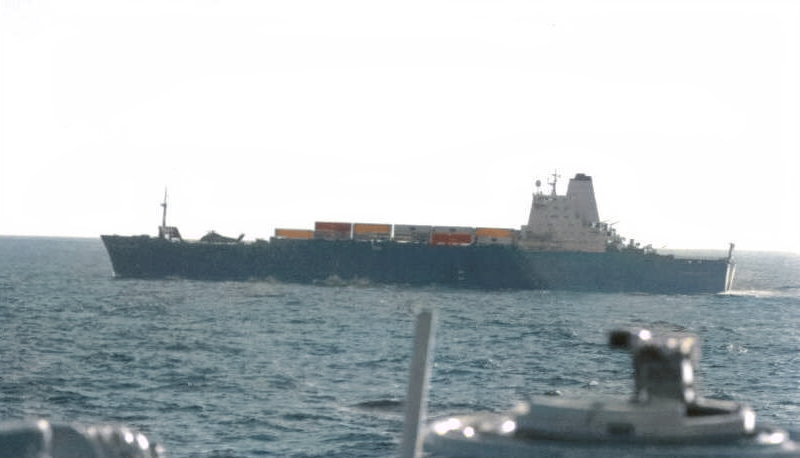
SS Atlantic Conveyor approaching the Falkland Islands. A Wessex helicopter can be seen on her bow landing pad.

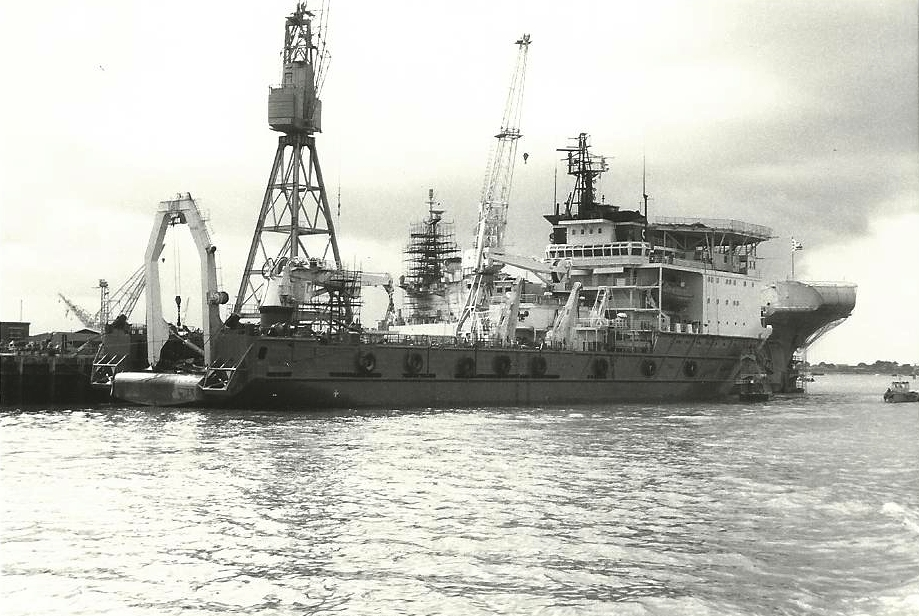
MV Stena Seaspread in Portsmouth at the end of hostilities.

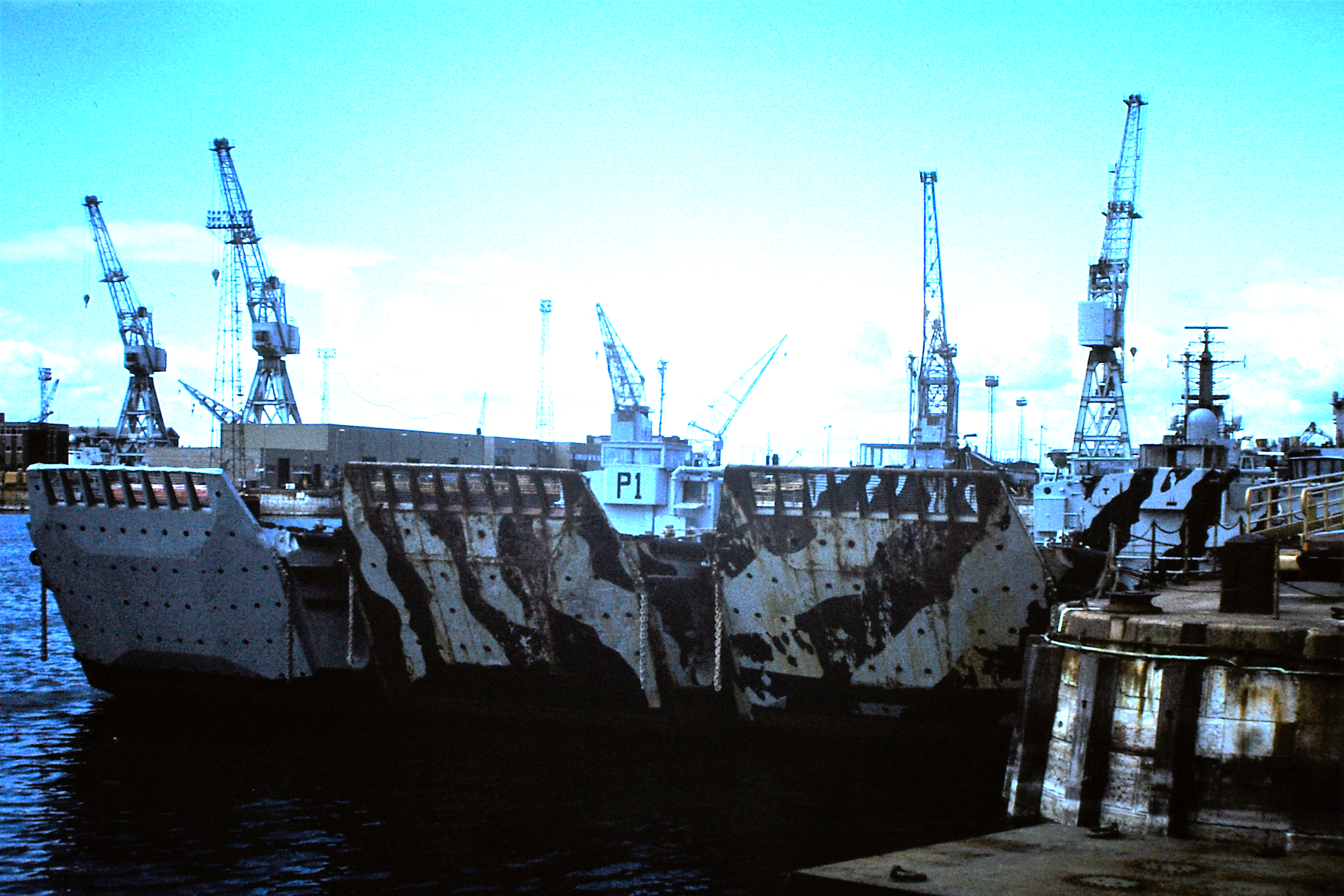
Landing craft from HMS Fearless and HMS Intrepid.

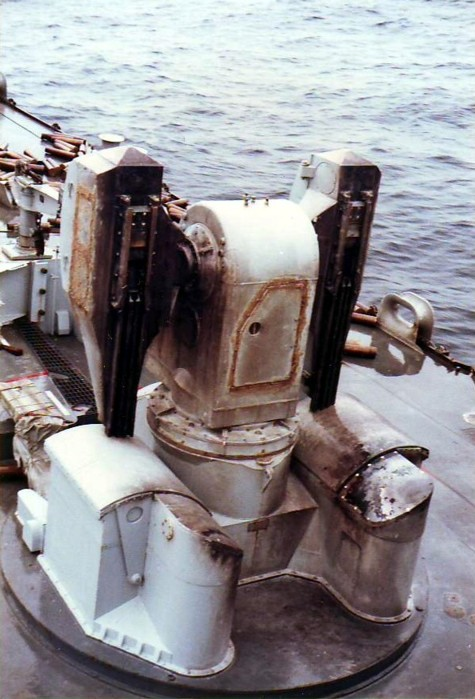
Spent Sea Dart launcher on HMS Cardiff.

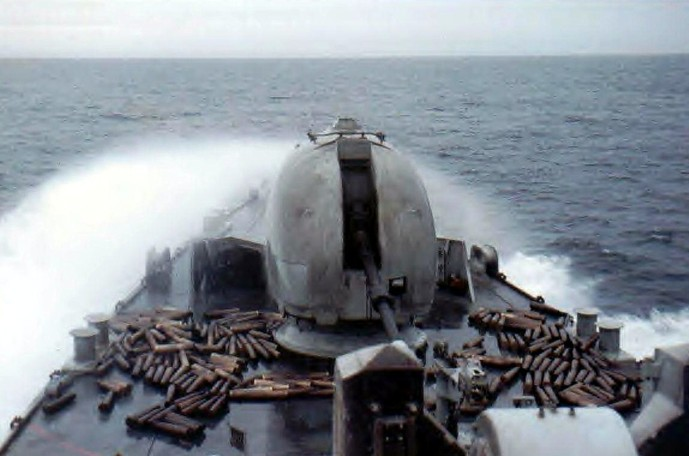
The 4.5-inch Mark 8 naval gun on HMS Cardiff, along with spent shell casings after a nighttime naval gunfire support mission.

==== Royal Navy ====
===== Submarines =====
- Swiftsure-class submarine (HMS Spartan, HMS Splendid)
- Churchill-class submarine (HMS Conqueror, HMS Courageous)
- Valiant-class submarine (HMS Valiant)
- Oberon-class submarine (HMS Onyx)

===== Aircraft carriers =====
- Centaur-class aircraft carrier (HMS Hermes)
- Invincible-class aircraft carrier (HMS Invincible)

===== Amphibious warfare ships =====
- Fearless-class landing platform dock (HMS Fearless, HMS Intrepid)

===== Destroyers =====
- Type 82 destroyer (HMS Bristol)
- Type 42 destroyer (HMS Sheffield, HMS Coventry, HMS Glasgow, HMS Cardiff, HMS Exeter)
- County-class destroyer (HMS Glamorgan, HMS Antrim)

===== Frigates =====
- Type 22 frigate (HMS Brilliant, HMS Broadsword)
- Type 21 frigate (HMS Active, HMS Alacrity, HMS Antelope, HMS Ardent, HMS Ambuscade, HMS Avenger, HMS Arrow)
- Leander-class frigate (HMS Andromeda, HMS Argonaut, HMS Minerva, HMS Penelope)
- Rothesay-class frigate (HMS Yarmouth, HMS Plymouth)

===== Offshore patrol vessels =====
- Castle-class patrol vessel (HMS Leeds Castle, HMS Dumbarton Castle)

===== Ice patrol vessels =====
- HMS Endurance

===== Ambulance ships =====
- Hecla-class survey vessel (HMS Hecla, HMS Herald, HMS Hydra)

===== Mine countermeasures vessels =====
- HMS Cordella
- HMS Farnella
- HMS Junella
- HMS Northella
- HMS Pict

===== Patrol vessels =====
- HMS Tiger Bay (Captured GC Islas Malvinas)

==== Royal Fleet Auxiliary ====
===== Tankers =====
- Rover-class replenishment tanker (RFA Blue Rover)
- Ol-class replenishment tanker (RFA Olna, RFA Olmeda)
- Leaf-class replenishment tanker (RFA Appleleaf, RFA Brambleleaf, RFA Bayleaf, RFA Plumleaf, RFA Pearleaf)
- Tide-class replenishment tanker (RFA Tidespring, RFA Tidepool)

===== Amphibious warfare ships =====
- Round Table-class landing ship logistics (RFA Sir Bedivere, RFA Sir Galahad, RFA Sir Geraint, , RFA Sir Lancelot, , RFA Sir Percivale, RFA Sir Tristram)

===== Supply ships =====
- Regent-class supply ship (RFA Regent, RFA Resource)
- Fort-class replenishment ship (RFA Fort Rosalie, RFA Fort Austin)
- Ness-class combat stores ship (RFA Stromness)

===== Naval aviation support ships =====
- RFA Engadine

==== Royal Maritime Auxiliary Service ====
===== Tugboats =====
- RMAS Typhoon
- RMAS Goosander

==== British Merchant Navy ====
===== Ocean liners and cruise ships =====
- Queen Elizabeth 2
- Canberra
- Uganda
- Cunard Countess

===== Roll-on-roll-off ferries =====
- Elk
- Baltic Ferry
- Europic Ferry
- Nordic Ferry
- Norland
- Rangatira
- St Edmund
- Tor Caledonia

===== Container ships =====
- Astronomer
- Atlantic Conveyer
- Atlantic Causeway
- Contender Bezant
- Myrmidon

===== Freighters =====
- Avelona Star
- Geestport
- Laertes
- Lycaon
- Saxonia
- Strathewe
- St Helena

===== Tankers =====
- Alvega
- Anco Charger
- Balder London
- British Avon
- British Dart
- British Esk
- British Tamar
- British Tay
- British Test
- British Trent
- British Wye
- Eburna
- Fort Toronto
- G.A.Walker
- Scottish Eagle

===== Tugboats, repair and support ships =====
- British Enterprise III
- Dan Lifter
- Iris
- Irishman
- Salvageman
- Stena Inspector
- Stena Seaspread
- Wimpey Seahorse
- Yorkshireman

==== Royal Marines ====
- Landing Craft Utility Mk.9
- Landing Craft Vehicle Personnel Mk.2
- Rigid Raider

==== British Army ====
- Mexeflote
- Gemini boat

==== Falkland Islands Ships ====
- Forrest
- Monsunen
- Penelope
- John Biscoe

== Anti-air ==
=== Argentina ===
Anti-aircraft guns

Argentine forces deployed a substantial number of anti-aircraft guns around Stanley and Goose Green airfields.

- 40mm Bofors Automatic Gun L/60
- 35mm Oerlikon GDF
- 30mm Hispano Suiza
- 20mm Rheinmetall Mk 20 Rh-202

Land-based surface-to-air missiles

- Roland - Argentine forces deployed a single launcher to defend Stanley airport; it succeeded in shooting down one Sea Harrier (XZ456) on 1 June 1982 above 10,000 feet (3000 m). The presence of the launcher forced British aircraft to operate above its envelope – typically at 18,000 feet (5,500 m) which severely reduced the accuracy of bombs dropped on the airport. The single Roland unit was later shipped back to Britain for analysis and testing.
- Tiger Cat - Argentine land forces had a total of 7 Tigercat missile launchers (Ex RAF); there were several near misses, and possibly one Sea Harrier had its engine damaged by shrapnel from one of the missiles.

=== United Kingdom ===
Naval surface-to-air missiles

- Sea Dart - British naval medium-range surface-to-air missile. It proved unable to engage low-altitude targets, such as Argentine A4 Skyhawk aircraft and Exocet missiles. However, it did achieve several long-range kills.
- Sea Wolf - British naval short-range low-altitude surface-to-air missile, used to complement the longer-range Sea Dart. It proved capable of engaging low-flying aircraft.
- Sea Cat
- Sea Slug - Long range, high altitude anti-aircraft missile system of the 1950s, was not used against aircraft but for bombardment of positions near Port Stanley by the Royal Navy ships equipped with it.

Land-based surface-to-air missiles

- Rapier - British surface-to-air missile developed for the British Army to replace their towed Bofors 40/L70 anti-aircraft guns. Its presence acted as a deterrent, especially after the deployment of Blind Fire systems around Port San Carlos.
- Tiger Cat

== Anti-ship ==
=== Argentina ===
Land-based surface-to-surface missiles

- Aérospatiale AM.39 Exocet (improvised)

== Electronic warfare and communications ==
=== Argentina ===
- AN/TPS-43
- AN/TPS-44
- Skyguard
- Super Fledermaus
- RASIT

=== United Kingdom ===
- Blindfire
- Clansman

== Artillery and mortars ==
=== Argentina ===
Artillery

- CITER 155 mm L33 gun
- OTO Melara Mod 56

Mortars

- 60 mm Mortar
- 81 mm Mortar
- 120mm Mortar

=== United Kingdom ===
Artillery

- L118 light gun

Mortars

- L16 81mm mortar

== Vehicles ==
=== Argentina ===
- LVTP-7
- LARC-V
- Panhard AML-90
- KrAZ-256
- Mercedes-Benz MB 1112/13/14
- Mercedes-Benz G-Class
- Unimog

=== United Kingdom ===
- FV101 Scorpion
- FV106 Samson
- FV107 Scimitar
- Centurion BARV
- Bandvagn 202
- Land Rover 101 Forward Control
- Land Rover 101 Forward Control Ambulance
- Land Rover Series IIA
- Land Rover Series III ((88 and 109 inch)
- Land Rover Series III Ambulance
- Bedford MK
- Eager Beaver Air Portable Fork Lift Truck
- Can-Am Bombardier Motorcycle
- Muir-Hill Loader
- Leyland 4-tonne truck
- Alvis Stalwart

== Infantry weapons ==
=== Argentina ===
==== Pistols ====
- Browning Hi-Power
- Colt M1911A1
- Colt Argentine Model 1927
- Ballester–Molina

==== Submachine guns ====
- PAM-1
- PAM-2
- FMK-3
- Halcón ML-63
- Uzi
- L34A1 Sterling (Suppressed)

==== Rifles ====
- FN FAL 50.61
- HK G3
- Beretta BM-59E
- M1 Garand
- Springfield M14
- Colt M16A1
- Colt CAR-15 Commando
- FN-49
- Steyr SSG 69
- Weatherby Mark V
- Mauser Modelo Argentino 1909
- Baatan 71

==== Machine guns ====
- FN FAL 50.41
- BAR M1918A2
- FN 60-20 MAG
- M2HB Browning
- FM Modelo 52
- M1919A4 Browning (Even local copy being used)

==== Anti-tank ====
- Model 1968 recoilless gun
- M67 recoilless rifle
- Instalaza M65

==== Anti-air ====
- 9K32 Strela-2 (SA-7 Grail)
- Blowpipe

==== Grenades ====
- FMK-2
- M67 grenade
- EA-M5 grenade
- PAF 62 FMK-2 rifle grenade
- PDEF 40 FMK-3 rifle grenade
- Instalaza Model 63 rifle grenade
- LM-2 underwater grenade (anti-swimmer depth charge)

==== Anti-personnel mines ====
- FMK-1
- SB-33
- No. 4
- P4B

==== Anti-tank mines ====
- C3B
- FMK-3
- M1
- No. 6
- SB-81

=== United Kingdom ===
==== Pistols ====
- L9A1 Browning
- L47A1 Walther

==== Submachine guns ====
- L34A1 Sterling (Suppressed)
- L2A3 Sterling
- L92A1 HK

==== Rifles ====
- L1A1 SLR
- M16A1 rifle
- Colt CAR-15 Commando
- L42A1 sniper rifle
- Parker-Hale M82
- L74A1 Remington

==== Machine guns ====
- L7A2 GPMG
- Enfield L4A4 Bren
- L2A1 HMG

==== Grenade launchers ====
- M203 grenade launcher
- M79 grenade launcher

==== Anti-tank ====
- MILAN anti-tank guided missile
- L1A1 Rocket 66 mm HEAT
- L6 WOMBAT
- L14A1 Carl Gustav recoilless rifle

==== Anti-air ====
- FIM-92 Stinger
- Blowpipe
