= Escuadrón Fénix =

Argentinian volunteer squadron during the Falklands War

Coat of Arms of the Escuadrón Fénix

The Phoenix Squadron (Spanish: Escuadrón Fénix) was a volunteers' special unit of the Argentine Air Force established during the 1982 Malvinas/Falklands War.

== History ==
The Argentine Air Force reconnaissance force at that time was formed around the Grupo 1 Aerofotográfico (English: 1st Air Photographic Group) part of the 2nd Air Brigade equipped with two Learjet 35As and based at Parana province of Entre Rios.

In April 1982, the unit was deployed to Comodoro Rivadavia and was reinforced with several civilian planes and their civilian pilots who volunteered to fly them.

During the war, the Learjets performed 52 missions including search and reconnaissance flights, communications retransmission flights, and pathfinder flights to guide combat jets with the Learjets’ superior navigation systems.

The unit's most difficult missions were 126 sorties in which the Learjets acted as decoys, flying day and night to simulate strike aircraft preparing to attack the fleet. Many believe that most of the Argentine A-4 Skyhawks' and Daggers' successes were achieved because the British Sea Harriers had been drawn away from more important targets:

His improvised Fenix squadron creatively baited the British with decoys, forced a response, and stretched their CAP coverage to improve the chances of survival and success of his attack force.

On one of these flights, on June 7, an Air Force Learjet was shot down over Pebble Island by a surface-to-air Sea Dart missile fired by HMS Exeter, killing the squadron commander, Vice Commodore Rodolfo De La Colina, and the other four members of the crew. De La Colina became the second highest ranking Argentine officer (after Col Arévalo) to die in the war.

Civilian helicopters were also added to the unit for use in the search and rescue role in the continent, most notably the Sikorsky S-61N LV-OCN and Sikorsky S-58T LV-OCM.

== Casualties ==
Argentine Air Force Learjet 35 T-24 crew:

- Vice Commodore Rodolfo De La Colina (pilot)
- Major Juan Falconier (co-pilot)
- Captain Marcelo Lotufo (photographer)
- Staff Sub-Officer Francisco Luna (mechanic)
- Assistant Sub-Officer Guido Marizza (mechanic).
