= Colt Mk 12 cannon =

Colt Mk 12
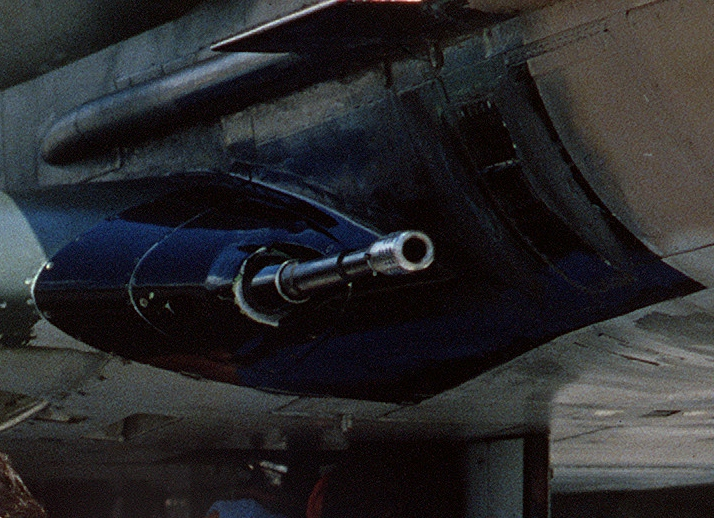
- Mk 12 cannon of a RNZAF Douglas A-4K Skyhawk.
- Type: Autocannon
- Place of origin: United States

Service history
- In service: 1950s – present
- Wars: Vietnam War; Falklands War; Gulf War

Production history
- Designer: Colt's Manufacturing Company
- Manufacturer: Colt's Manufacturing Company

Specifications
- Mass: 46.0 kg (101.4 lb)
- Cartridge: 20×110mm USN
- Caliber: 20 mm (0.787 in)
- Action: Gas-operated reloading
- Rate of fire: 1,000 rpm
- Muzzle velocity: 1,010 m/s (3,300 ft/s)

The Colt Mk 12 is a 20 mm autocannon that was widely used by the United States Navy after World War II.

== Development ==
The Mk 12 was an advanced derivative of the wartime Hispano HS 404 that was used on French, British and some American fighter aircraft during World War II. It used a lighter projectile with a bigger charge for better muzzle velocity and higher rate of fire at the cost of hitting power. It entered U.S. Navy and U.S. Marine Corps service in the mid-1950s, replacing the earlier M3 cannon.

In service, the Mk 12 proved less than satisfactory. Although its muzzle velocity and rate of fire were acceptable, it was inaccurate and frequently unreliable. Pilots of the F-8 Crusader over North Vietnam, in particular, appreciated the presence of the cannon, but jams and stoppages were common, especially following hard dogfighting maneuvers in high-g environments.

Nevertheless, the Mk 12 was standard cannon armament on gun-armed American naval fighters and attack aircraft from the early 1950s to the early 1970s, including the F4D Skyray, F3H Demon, A-4 Skyhawk, F-8 Crusader, F-11 Tiger and early navy versions of the LTV A-7 Corsair II.

International customers of the A-4 Skyhawk, F-8 Crusader, and the A-7 Corsair II also used the Mk 12 cannon: Argentina, Australia, Brazil, France, Kuwait, Malaysia, New Zealand, the Philippines and Portugal. The only exceptions were Israel and Singapore. The Israeli Air Force replaced the Mk 12 cannon with the French 30 mm DEFA cannon (a revolver design) in its Skyhawks, while the Republic of Singapore Air Force fitted the British 30 mm ADEN cannon (another revolver). Indonesia later bought some used A-4s from Israel.

As of 2013, the Mk 12 cannon is still in use in Skyhawks of the Argentine Air Force and the Brazilian Navy.

== See also ==
- M39 cannon

== Bibliography ==
- Williams, Anthony G. (2022). Autocannon: A History of Automatic Cannon and Their Ammunition. Marlborough, UK: Crowood Press. ISBN 978-1-78500-920-4.
