= 20×110mm USN =

Cold War-era American autocannon cartridge

- Type: Autocannon
- Place of origin: USA

Service history
- In service: 1950s–present
- Used by: United States Navy; Royal New Zealand Air Force
- Wars: Vietnam War

Production history
- Designer: United States Navy

Specifications
- Case type: Rimless, bottleneck
- Bullet diameter: 19.9 mm (0.78 in)
- Neck diameter: 20.6 mm (0.81 in)
- Base diameter: 29 mm (1.1 in)
- Rim diameter: 29.5 mm (1.16 in)
- Case length: 109.5 mm (4.31 in)
- Overall length: 185 mm (7.3 in)
- Primer type: Electric
- Maximum pressure: 600 MPa (87,000 psi)

Ballistic performance
Bullet mass/type	Velocity	Energy
1,700 gr (110 g) Mk 105 HEI	1,010 m/s (3,300 ft/s)	56,105 j

The 20×110mm USN (also known as 20×110mm US Navy and 20mm Mk-100 Series) is an autocannon cartridge developed by the US Navy after World War II for use in Mk 11 and Mk 12 autocannons. They are called the Mk 100 series as they range from Mk 101 to Mk 109.

It has the same rim diameter as the 20×102mm but a different length and contour. It is not interchangeable with any other 20×110mm cartridge.

== Available loads ==
Some of the available loads for the 20×110mm USN are as follows:

Name	Pressure (PSI)	Projectile weight (grains)	Projectile Type	Muzzle Velocity (fps)	Identification
Cartridge, 20 mm, High Pressure Test (HPT), Mk 101 Mod 0 (USN)	Not to exceed 72,500	1700	Inert	Not listed	Green or blue projectile with brown nose and 1/4 black letters reading "High pressure test round"
Cartridge, 20 mm, Low Pressure Test (LPT), Mk 102 Mod 0 (USN)	Not listed	1700	Inert	Not listed	Green or blue projectile with brown nose and 1/4 black letters reading "Low pressure test round"
Cartridge, 20 mm, Dummy, MK 103 (USN)	n/a	1700	Inert	n/a	No primer or propellant, MK11 brown projectile.
Cartridge, 20 mm, Target Practice (TP), Mk 105 Mod 0 (USN)	Not to exceed 72,500	1700	Inert	3350	Green or blue projectile black lettering or blue projectile with brown nose and black lettering
Cartridge, 20 mm, High Explosive Incendiary (HEI), Mk 106 Mod 0 & 1 (USN)	60,000	1700 ±50	Impact detonating	3350	Unpainted fuze, red and yellow projectile
Cartridge, 20 mm, Armor-Piercing Incendiary (API), Mk 107 Mod 0 (USN)	60,000	1700 ±50	Armor-piercing incendiary	3350	No fuze, nose of projectile blue or brown with red band. Body of projectile black with white lettering.
Cartridge, 20 mm, Armor-Piercing Tracer (AP-T), Mk 108 Mod 0 (USN)	60,000	1700 ±50	Armor-piercing tracer	3350	No fuze. Hollow windshield. Brown or yellow nose, body of projectile black with white lettering.
Cartridge, 20 mm, Firing Circuit Test, MK109 (USN)	n/a	n/a	n/a	n/a	Used for electric firing circuit tests, no projectile

There is also a cartridge, 20 mm, dummy, Mk 103 Mod 0 (USN) which is an inert round. It has an empty primer pocket and holes in the case or a plugged primer pocket. It may be empty or filled with inert material. The projectile is usually brass or bronze plated.
