= RMAS Typhoon =

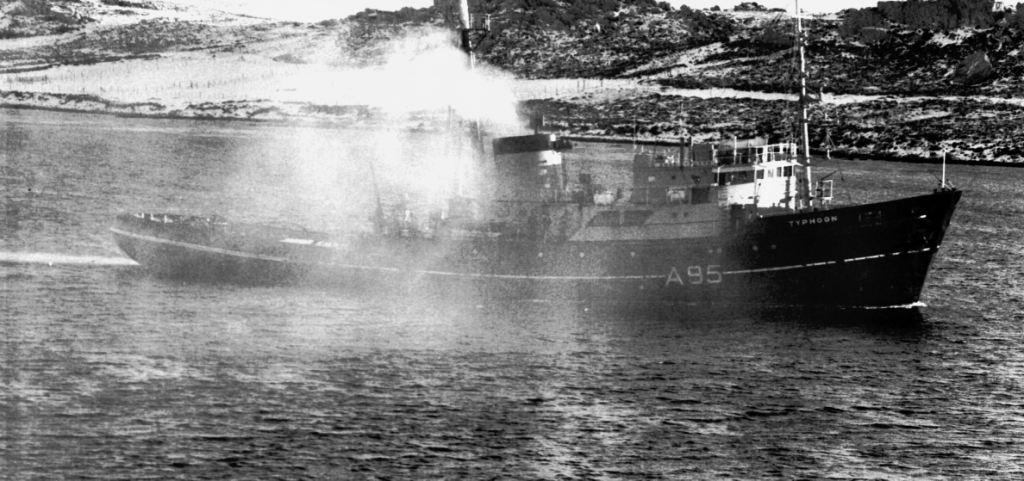
- RMAS Typhoon in Port Stanley during the Falklands War

History

United Kingdom
- Name: RMAS Typhoon
- Builder: Henry Robb & Co Ltd, Leith
- Launched: 14 October 1958
- Commissioned: 1960
- Identification: IMO number: 5371765

General characteristics
- Type: Ocean-going tug
- Displacement: 800 tons standard; 1380 tons full load
- Length: 200 ft (61 m)'
- Beam: 40 ft (12 m)'
- Draught: 13 ft (4.0 m)'
- Propulsion: 2 turbocharged ASR 1 Vee-type 12-cylinder diesels; single shaft; Controllable pitch propeller, 150 rpm; 2750 bhp
- Speed: 16+ kts
- Complement: 15 (est.)
- Armament: None
- Notes: Bollard pull 32 tons. Fitted for fire-fighting, salvage and ocean rescue.

RMAS Typhoon (A95) was an ocean-going tug of the Royal Maritime Auxiliary Service (RMAS). She was designed for ocean towing, rescue, salvage and fire-fighting. She was the first ship to leave the United Kingdom ahead of the task force for the South Atlantic during the 1982 Falklands War. She had a fishery protection role in the Cod Wars.

== History ==
The ship was repaired at Falmouth ship repair yard on 19 October 1979, and was also involved in the rescue of the Spanish butane tanker, MV Butaseis, which was aflame and drifting towards the village of Brixham, Devon. The tug stayed as part of the Royal Fleet Auxiliary until included in the RMAS.

Typhoon saw service in the Falklands War from leaving the UK on 4 April 1982 until 20 July 1982 under Captain J N Morris with an all-civilian crew from Portland Naval Base. She also carried 2 Royal Naval Personnel, 1 for comms and 1 medic; they had the distinction of being first to leave and returned home 24 September 1982 as did HMS Hydra docking in last that day 24 September 1982 in Portsmouth. Captain Morris and his civilian crew flew back from Port Stanley when Capt Stephens and the relief crew arrived in Port Stanley 20 July 1982. Under the command of Captain Bruce Stephens she returned to Portland with her new civilian crew. The 2 Royal Navy Crew remained on board until the vessel docked on 24 September 1982. She was the first ship – albeit a civilian vessel – to leave the UK ahead of the task force, and a member of the crew, the tug's bosun, placed the Welsh flag on board RFA Sir Galahad just before Typhoon towed her out to sea to be scuttled by a submarine. During the war, the ship was heavily involved in logistic duties, transferring fresh water to the task force at a rate of 18 tons per trip, and loading part of 17 Brigade onto the MV Norland in preparation for the San Carlos landings. The ship was sold in 1989 and later converted into a trawler in 1992.
