= British logistics in the Falklands War =

1982 combat service support operations

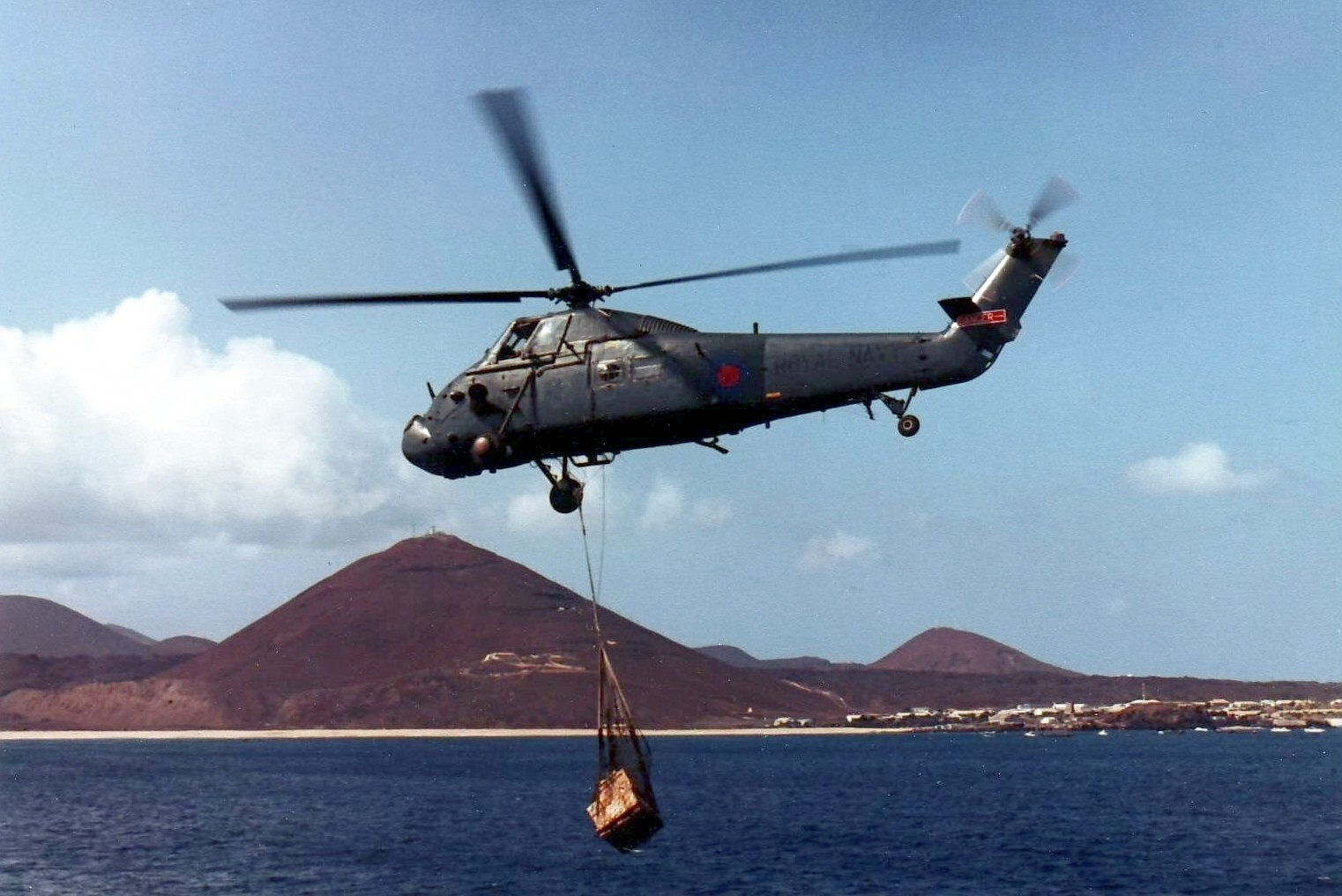
A Westland Wessex helicopter delivering supplies at Ascension Island in May 1982

The 1982 British military campaign to recapture the Falkland Islands depended on complex logistical arrangements. The logistical difficulties of operating 7,000 nautical miles (8,100 mi; 13,000 km) from home were formidable. The Argentine invasion of the Falkland Islands came at a time when the Royal Navy was experiencing a reduction in its amphibious capability, but it still possessed the aircraft carriers HMS Hermes and Invincible, the landing platform dock (LPD) ships HMS Fearless and Intrepid, and six landing ship logistics (LSL) ships. To provide the necessary logistic support, the Royal Navy's ships were augmented by ships taken up from trade (STUFT).

The British Army and Royal Navy developed a base at Ascension Island, a British territory in the mid-Atlantic 3,700 nautical miles (4,300 mi; 6,900 km) from the UK and 3,300 nautical miles (3,800 mi; 6,100 km) from the Falkland Islands. Although it had an airfield with an excellent runway, there was only a small hardstand area for parking aircraft and no parallel taxiways. There was an anchorage, but no port facilities—just a lone jetty. Ascension was used as a convenient place for the amphibious ships to re-stow their equipment, and as a base for Hercules transport aircraft, which were modified by the addition of auxiliary fuel tanks and aerial refuelling probes. With the support of Victor tankers, these modifications allowed the transports to deliver priority supplies to the South Atlantic.

The 3rd Commando Brigade landed at Ajax Bay, Port San Carlos and San Carlos on East Falkland, but struggled to build up its supplies as the Argentine air forces made repeated attacks on ships in Falkland Sound. SS Atlantic Conveyor was struck by two Exocet AM39 missiles, and sank with three Chinook and six Wessex helicopters still on board, along with their tools and spare parts, and other vital stores including tent accommodation. The loss of the helicopters on Atlantic Conveyor was a serious blow; it forced the 3rd Commando Brigade to make a loaded march across East Falkland. The Brigade Maintenance Area (BMA) was struck by an Argentine air attack on 27 May that destroyed hundreds of rounds of mortar and artillery ammunition. Forward Brigade Maintenance Areas (FBMAs) were established at Teal Inlet for the 3rd Commando Brigade and Fitzroy for the 5th Infantry Brigade. Some 500 rounds per gun were delivered to gun positions by helicopters to enable the artillery to support the attacks on the mountains ringing Port Stanley. The successful conclusion of these battles resulted in the surrender of the Argentine forces in the Falklands on 14 June.

== Background ==
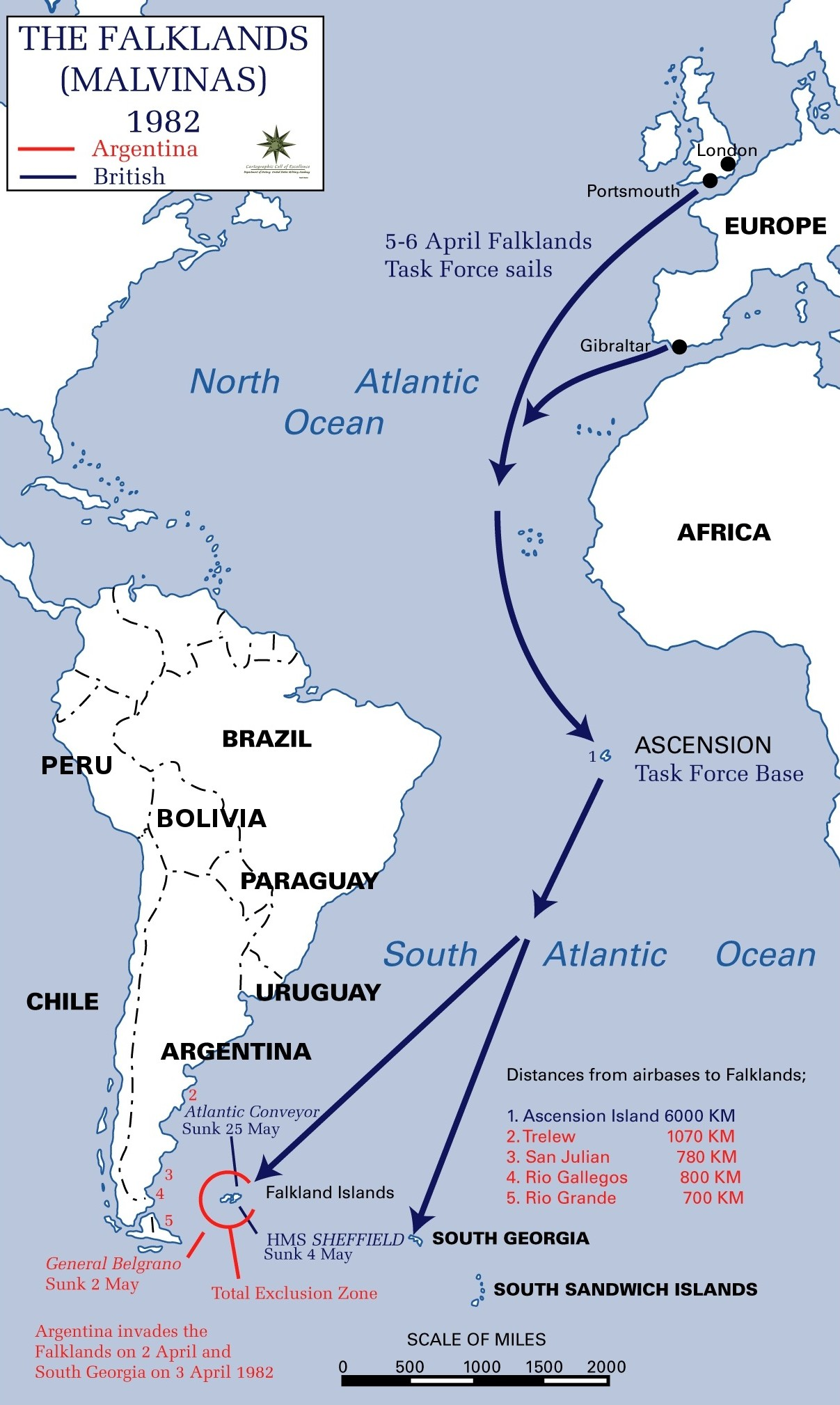
Key locations and the route taken by British forces during the Falklands War

Tensions between Britain and Argentina over the disputed Falkland Islands rose swiftly after Argentine scrap metal merchants and Argentina Marines raised the Argentine flag over South Georgia Island on 19 March 1982, and on 2 April, Argentine forces occupied the Falkland Islands. The British government had already taken some action on 29 March, ordering the submarines HMS Spartan and HMS Splendid to sail for the South Atlantic. Spartan left Gibraltar on 1 April, and Splendid sailed from Faslane the same day. A third submarine, HMS Conqueror, followed on 4 April.

The Royal Fleet Auxiliary (RFA) stores ship RFA Fort Austin was despatched from the Western Mediterranean to replenish the only British warship in the South Atlantic, the patrol vessel HMS Endurance, which was down to its last three weeks' supplies. The tanker RFA Appleleaf, which had left Curaçao bound for the United Kingdom with a full load of fuel, received orders on 27 March to divert to Gibraltar, embark stores there, and join Endurance and Fort Austin in the South Atlantic.

When intelligence was received in London on 31 March that the Falklands would be invaded on 2 April, the Prime Minister, Margaret Thatcher, and the Secretary of State for Defence, John Nott, instructed the First Sea Lord, Admiral Sir Henry Leach, to ready a force to recapture the islands. The Commander-in-Chief Fleet, Admiral Sir John Fieldhouse, who was based at Northwood Headquarters, was placed in command of Task Force 317, with overall responsibility for this operation, codenamed Operation Corporate. Air Marshal Sir John Curtiss was appointed air component commander, and Major General Jeremy Moore, land component commander.

Rear Admiral Sandy Woodward, Flag Officer First Flotilla, commanded the aircraft carrier battle group (TG 317.8); Commodore Michael Clapp, the Commodore, Amphibious Warfare, commanded the amphibious force (TG 317.0); and Brigadier Julian Thompson, the landing force (TG 317.1). Thompson's force was built around his 3rd Commando Brigade, which had three battalions of the Royal Marines (40 Commando, 42 Commando and 45 Commando), and supporting units including its own logistic support unit, the Commando Logistic Regiment. About 80 per cent of the Commando Logistic Regiment's men were Royal Marines; the rest came from the British Army and Royal Navy.

== Shipping ==
=== Amphibious ===
On 2 April, orders went out to make the Royal Navy's two aircraft carriers, HMS Hermes and Invincible, ready to sail. Both had been involved in exercises in February and March, and were at HMNB Portsmouth for six weeks' maintenance. Many of Hermes's major systems had been dismantled for the maintenance work. Invincible was in a better state of readiness, but her crew were on leave. The Royal Navy's two landing platform dock (LPD) ships, HMS Fearless and HMS Intrepid, were also at Portsmouth, where the former was acting as an officer training ship and the latter was being mothballed, having been earmarked to be paid off under the terms of the 1981 Defence White Paper though that decision had been reversed only weeks prior to the outbreak of hostilities in the South Atlantic. She was hastily recommissioned, and her crew reassembled from their new postings. Each LPD carried four Landing Craft Utility (LCU) in its dock, and four of the smaller Landing Craft Vehicle Personnel (LCVP) on davits.

The rest of the Royal Navy's amphibious capability consisted of six Round Table-class landing ship logistics (LSL) ships. Four were immediately available: RFA Sir Galahad and Sir Geraint were at HMNB Devonport, while RFA Sir Lancelot and Sir Percivale were at the Marchwood Military Port. The other two were further away: RFA Sir Tristram was in Belize, and could meet up with the fleet on its way south; but RFA Sir Bedivere was in Vancouver, British Columbia, Canada, and would not be immediately available. It was therefore decided to use the stores ship RFA Stromness, which was also in reserve at Portsmouth, as an LPD in the initial stages, after which she would revert to her normal role. Stromness departed on 7 April with 358 Royal Marines and 7,500 rations on board.

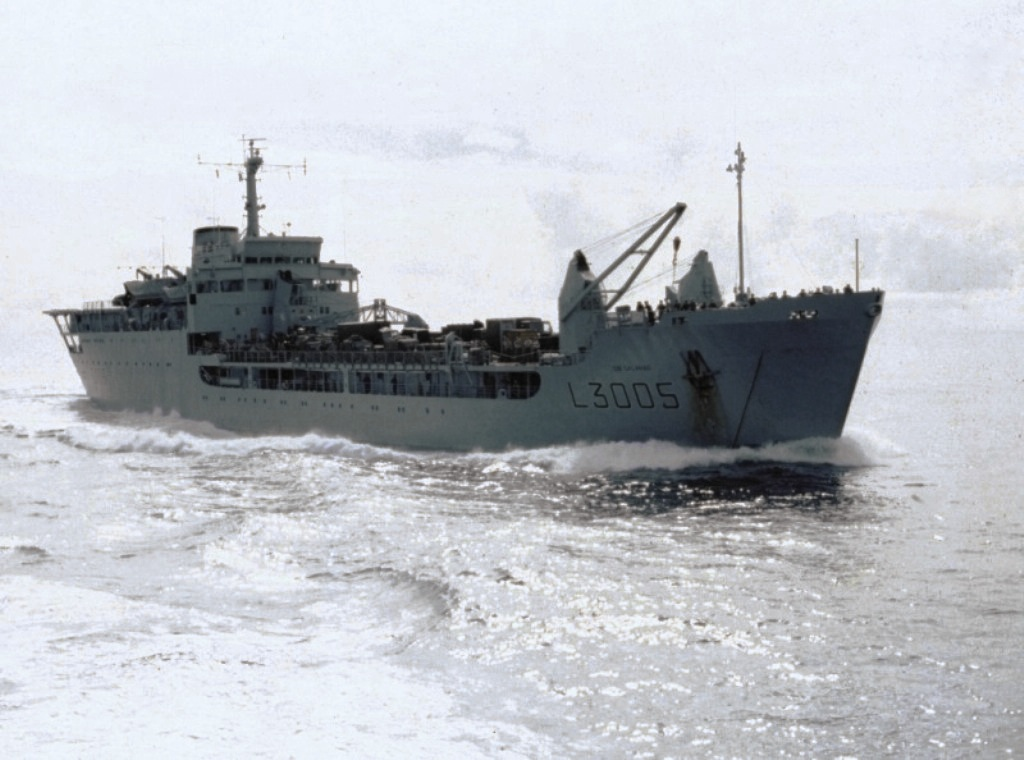
RFA Sir Galahad heading south in May 1982

As vital as they were, these ships were insufficient for the logistics needs of a task force operating 8,000 miles (13,000 km) from home. Civilian ships could be obtained by charter or by requisition; but there was no time to allow ships to complete the deliveries of their cargo or meet their existing passenger booking obligations. The British government therefore resorted to requisitioning, a practice last exercised during the Suez Crisis in 1956. An Order in Council was issued on 4 April allowing any British ship to be requisitioned, along with anything on board. Civilian ships acquired became known as ships taken up from trade (STUFT). Half were requisitioned; the rest were chartered. Some companies, such as P&O, insisted on requisitioning, as it allowed them to break existing contracts.

Government policy was that only British-flagged vessels could be requisitioned, and only British nationals could serve as crewmen. British crewmen were retained, and a 150 per cent bonus was paid to those who entered the South Atlantic, considerably more than the extra £1 per day paid to members of the armed services. Among the RFA crews were some 400 Hong Kong Chinese, who were British Overseas Territories citizens. Some protested that their contracts said nothing about service in a war zone, but the Ministry of Defence refuted this. A declaration of active service brought everyone under the Naval Discipline Act 1957. A senior naval officer was assigned to each ship, with authority to direct the ship's actions and movements, even if, in the opinion of the master, it might put the ship at risk.

Many modern ships are designed for maximum economy in performing a specific task, which limits their flexibility. The ferries that plied the English Channel, for example, did not have the capacity to store enough fresh water for a voyage to the South Atlantic. STUFT had to have a combination of range, endurance and sea-keeping qualities. The need for range meant that ships could not take on sea water as ballast, making them less stable in the rough seas anticipated in the South Atlantic. Only one vessel was taken up for every four inspected. Over the next few months, 54 ships were requisitioned from 33 owners. During the Falklands War they carried 100,000 long tons (100,000 t) of freight, 95 aircraft, 9,000 personnel, and 400,000 long tons (410,000 t) of fuel.

On 3 April it was decided to add the 3rd Battalion, Parachute Regiment (3 Para) to Thompson's 3rd Commando Brigade. This ended plans for the amphibious force to carry the entire landing force. Even if troops were accommodated on the aircraft carriers, they could not carry what was now a 4,350-man force. Calculations indicated that capacity was short by 1,700 men, 150 long tons (150 t) of stores and 60 vehicles. For a troop transport, an ocean liner was the best alternative, but there were few of these left. P&O's 44,807-gross-register-ton (126,880 m^{3}) SS Canberra was chosen. She was on a cruise in the Mediterranean with a full complement of passengers and crew, but due to return to Southampton on 6 April. Some 400 of her crew were Asian nationals, and therefore had to be disembarked, but her master, Captain D. J. Scott-Masson, was a Royal Naval Reserve officer.

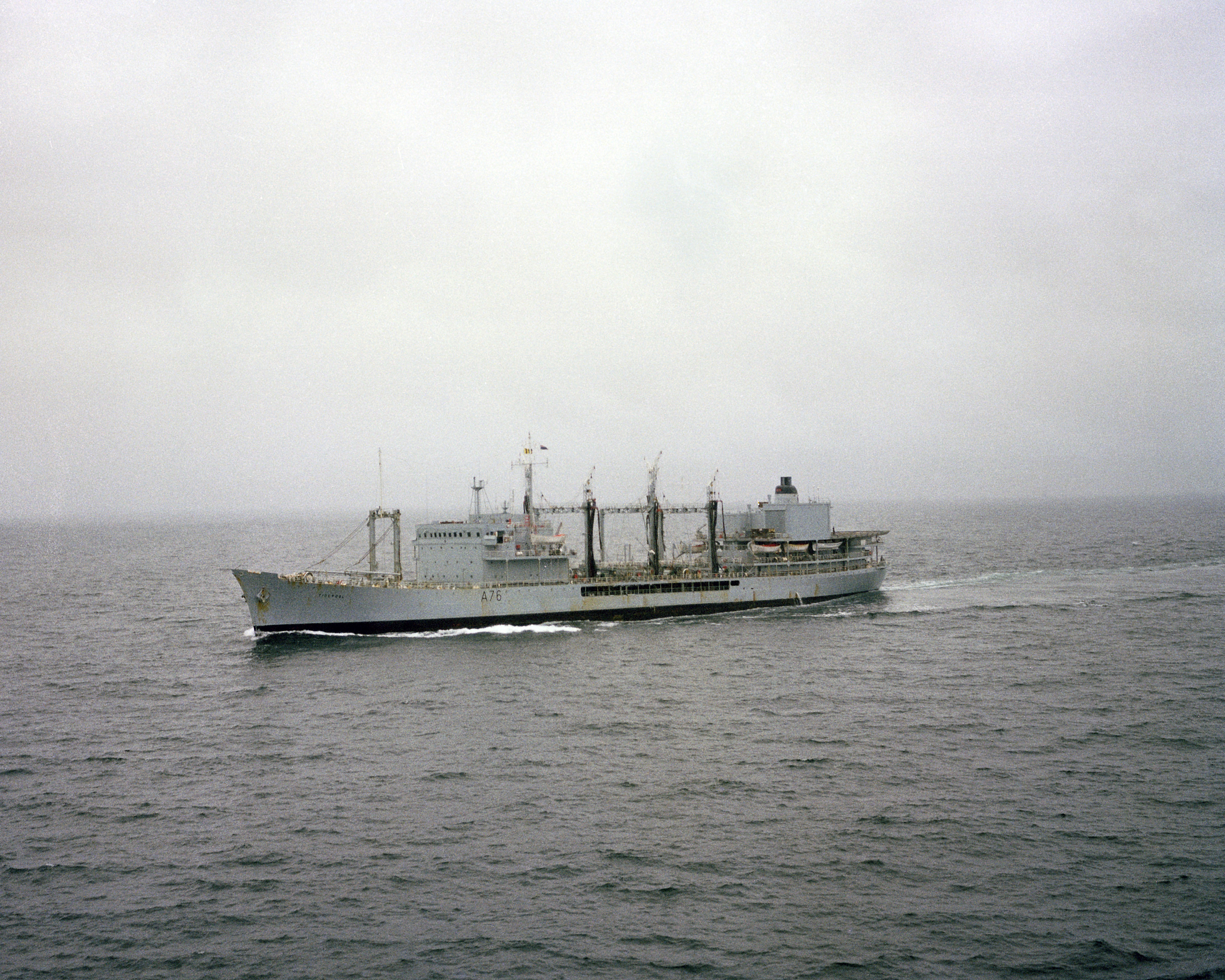
RFA Tidepool in 1982

The Chiefs of Staff Committee subsequently recommended further reinforcing the 3rd Commando Brigade with another battalion, the 2nd Battalion, Parachute Regiment (2 Para). This was approved by the War Cabinet on 15 April. To carry it, the 12,988-gross-register-ton (36,780 m^{3}) ferry MV Norland was requisitioned on 17 April. She was far from ideal, as her ramp could not be lowered to the height of the mexeflote landing rafts carried by the LSLs, but the choices of available ships were limited. For transporting vehicles, a roll-on/roll-off vessel was preferred, as unloading facilities were unavailable in the Falkland Islands. The 5,463-gross-register-ton (15,470 m^{3}) P&O ferry MS Elk was therefore requisitioned. It took on 100 vehicles, 2,000 tons of ammunition, and several hundred tons of stores. It was followed by the 4,190-gross-register-ton (11,900 m^{3}) MS Europic Ferry, which was taken up on 19 April. Cunard's 14,946-gross-register-ton (42,320 m^{3}) container ship, SS Atlantic Conveyor was requisitioned on 14 April and converted into an aircraft transport.

Soon after his appointment as land component commander on 9 April, Moore began to press for British Army's 5th Infantry Brigade to be sent to the South Atlantic as well. Fieldhouse formally requested this on 27 April. The brigade had a strength of 3,961 men, and for 35 days' operations it required 1,067 long tons (1,084 t) of ammunition, 1,129 long tons (1,147 t) of stores, 205 vehicles and 19 helicopters. If the ships carrying the 3rd Commando Brigade were to be reused, even if the troops were flown to Ascension Island and embarked from there, they could not reach the Falkland Islands before the middle of June. It was therefore decided that the brigade would have to be carried in other ships. The War Cabinet only approved the despatch of the 5th Infantry Brigade on 2 May. The Cunard Line's 67,140-gross-register-ton (190,100 m^{3}) SS Queen Elizabeth 2 was taken up just 19 hours before she was due to depart for the Mediterranean with cruise passengers.

To carry the 5th Infantry Brigade's vehicles and stores, two more roll-on/roll-off vessels were requisitioned, the 6,455-gross-register-ton (18,280 m^{3}) MS Baltic Ferry and Nordic Ferry. Atlantic Conveyor's sister ship, SS Atlantic Causeway, was requisitioned for the same conversion to an aircraft transport on 4 May. They were joined by the helicopter support ship RFA Engadine. Atlantic Causeway was loaded with vehicles and stores, requiring another vessel to carry the aircraft. It had also been decided to send another six RAF Harriers to augment the six already sent on Atlantic Conveyor. MV Contender Bezant was requisitioned for conversion to an aircraft transport on 10 May, followed by Astronomer on 29 May.

=== Logistical ===
Fuel was a critical requirement of the task force, and for political reasons could not be obtained from South America or South Africa. Countries in South America, even if sympathetic, felt unable to offer overt support in a conflict involving a neighbouring state, while South Africa was an international pariah at the time due to its system of apartheid, and collaboration with its regime risked alienating other countries at a time when Britain needed all the support it could muster for its international diplomatic efforts. The nearest source of supply was Freetown in Sierra Leone, 4,100 miles (6,600 km) from the Falkland Islands. To carry the diesel fuel required by the gas turbines of the warships and the fuel oil required by Hermes and some of the older RFA and STUFT, the fourteen RFA tankers were supplemented by fifteen requisitioned tankers.

RFA Tidespring and Appleleaf accompanied Woodward's force of ships that sailed from Gibraltar, while RFA Pearleaf and Olmeda were detailed to accompany the force departing from the UK. RFA Blue Rover was returning from Gibraltar to the UK; she was ordered to take on aviation fuel and petrol at Portsmouth. RFA Brambleleaf was in the Indian Ocean, and was ordered to proceed to the South Atlantic via the Cape of Good Hope. RFA Tidepool had been sold to Chile and was off the coast of Peru on its way there, but its government allowed it to be temporarily repossessed on 3 April. The first two tankers to be chartered were BP's 25,905 DWT British Esk at Hamburg and 25,000 DWT British Tay at Swansea on 5 April, followed by the 25,498 DWT British Tamar on 7 April, and 25,651 DWT British Dart on 9 April.

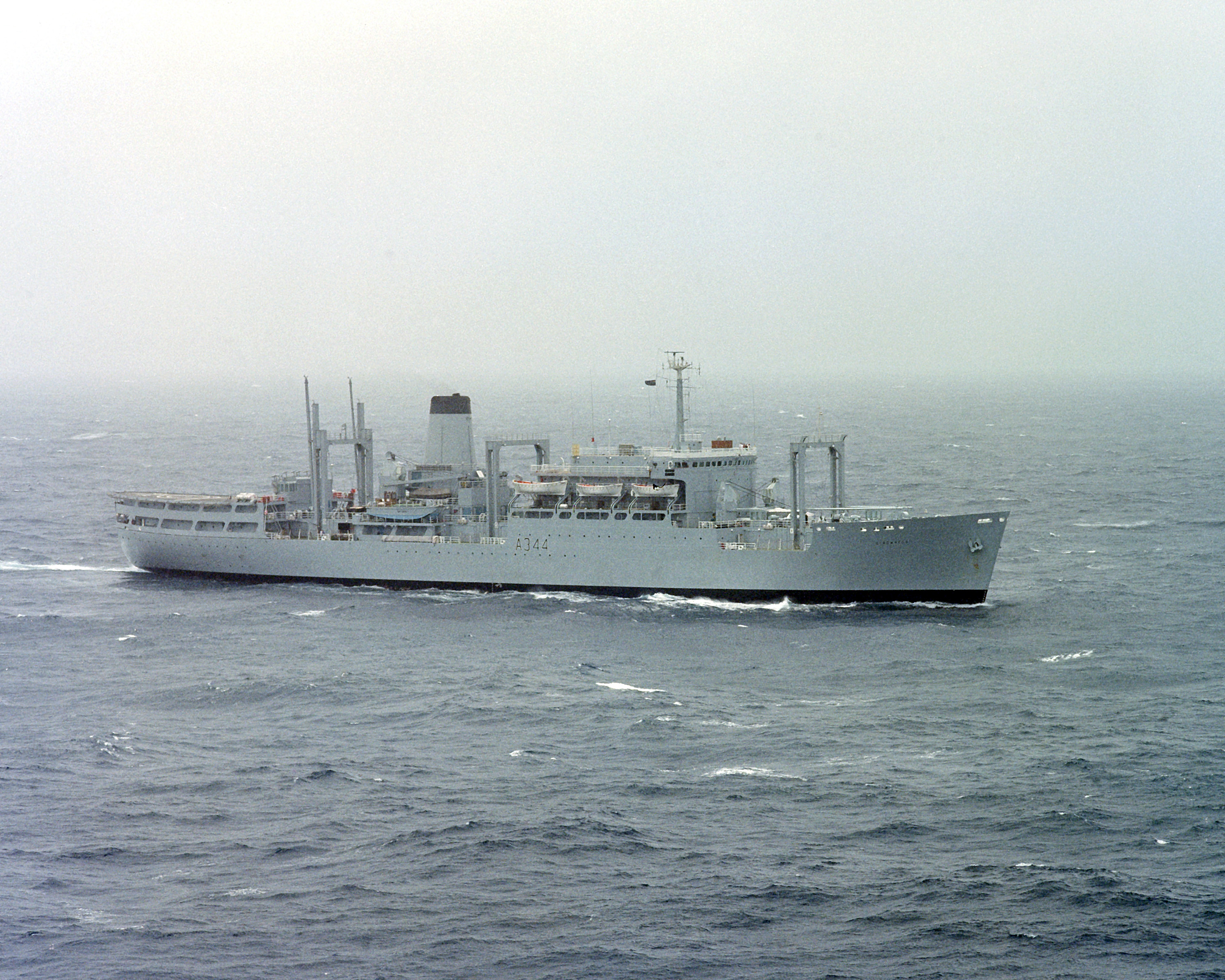
RFA Stromness in 1982

Although the Royal Navy ships in the task force were fitted with reverse osmosis systems for producing potable water, many civilian ships were not, and some ships needed more water than usual owing to their carrying additional passengers. The 31,400-gross-register-ton (89,000 m^{3}) SS Fort Toronto was chartered from Canadian Pacific for service as a water tanker. The supply of water while under way was simpler than fuel, as the hoses are lighter and the quantities involved are not as great. The 6,061-gross-register-ton (17,160 m^{3}) North Sea oil rig support ship SS Stena Seaspread was taken up to act as a repair ship. The Royal Maritime Auxiliary Service had one ocean-going tugboat, RMAS Typhoon, but it was evident that more would be required, and three were requisitioned from the United Towing company: SS Salvageman, Irishman and Yorkshireman.

The Royal Navy had no hospital ships. HMY Britannia had been built to allow its conversion into a hospital ship, but she required special fuel oil, and had only a 200-bed capacity. Instead, the 16,907-gross-register-ton (47,880 m^{3}) P&O liner SS Uganda, which was in the Mediterranean on an educational cruise with a thousand schoolchildren on board, was requisitioned, and modified to become a hospital ship. A team of 135 medical personnel was assigned, which included members of Queen Alexandra's Royal Naval Nursing Service (QARNNS). This was the first time that QARNNS personnel had been deployed afloat since the Korean War. They brought a packaged 250-bed portable hospital and 90 tons of medical supplies with them. Beds were provided for 20 intensive-care patients and 94 medium-dependency patients. Up to 940 low-dependency patients could be accommodated in dormitories. Three Hecla-class survey vessels, HMS Hecla, Herald and Hydra, became ambulance ships.

Hospital ships were exempt from attack under the Geneva Conventions, but they also require that patients not be returned directly to the battlefield after treatment. Due to the distances involved, this meant that treatment on Uganda would involve a prolonged absence, even those with relatively minor injuries that were anticipated such as trench foot. Additional medical facilities were therefore established elsewhere in the task force. Surgical teams were also embarked on Hermes, Fearless and Canberra. In addition to the British Army medical staff embarked, there were 425 Royal Navy medical staff with the task force, including 103 doctors. Some 40 Royal Naval Reserve doctors were called up for service in the UK to replace those headed for the South Atlantic. The departure of so many trained personnel led to the suspension of nursing training at the Royal Naval Hospital, Haslar, and Royal Naval Hospital, Stonehouse. The Army Blood Supply Depot issued 800 units to the task force, and more units were obtained from a blood donation drive on Canberra.

== Dockyards ==
It was initially hoped that ships could be loaded and converted at commercial shipyards, but these were soon overwhelmed by the requirements for skilled labour and specialised facilities, and the burden fell on the Royal Navy Dockyards at Portsmouth, Devonport, Chatham, Portland, Rosyth and Gibraltar. These had been subject to cutbacks; redundancy notices had been issued at Portsmouth on 2 April, and Chatham and Gibraltar had been slated for closure. Along with Marchwood, the home of the Army's 17 Port Regiment and the home base of the six LSLs, they were not bound by legal limits on the handling of explosives. Marchwood had only a single jetty, capable of accepting two ships, and could not accept deep draft vessels. Most major ship conversions were carried out at Devonport. Portsmouth carried out seven major conversions, including Norland, and fourteen minor ones, of which ten were tankers. These were the simplest conversions, as all they involved was installing communications equipment and replenishment at sea (RAS) systems to allow the tankers to supply fuel over the stern using a long, buoyant hose. Under normal circumstances they could pump 450 long tons (460 t) per hour, whereas an RFA tanker could refuel warships running alongside, with transfer rates of 600 long tons (610 t) per hour.

Other ships required major alterations. The conversion of Atlantic Conveyor at Devonport required the removal of 500 tie-down points for containers from her deck, adding a landing pad for helicopters and Hawker Siddeley Harriers, installing UHF radio equipment and satellite communications, providing accommodation for 122 men, installing a liquid oxygen tank, cutting additional hatches, and modifying the stern doors. Similar conversions were undertaken on Atlantic Causeway, Contender Bezant and Astronomer. The experience with Atlantic Conveyor allowed these to be converted far more quickly. The conversion of Uganda to a hospital ship was carried out at Gibraltar in 65 hours. Minesweepers were converted at Rosyth. Some 17 ships were fitted with helicopter landing pads; on Canberra and Queen Elizabeth 2, the area around the swimming pool was used, as it had been designed to hold the weight of 70 to 100 long tons (71 to 102 t) of water. On RMS St Helena and the cable ship Iris there was insufficient room for the flight deck and it had to be cantilevered over the stern. All ships fitted to operate helicopters also had to have communications, lighting and glide path indicators.

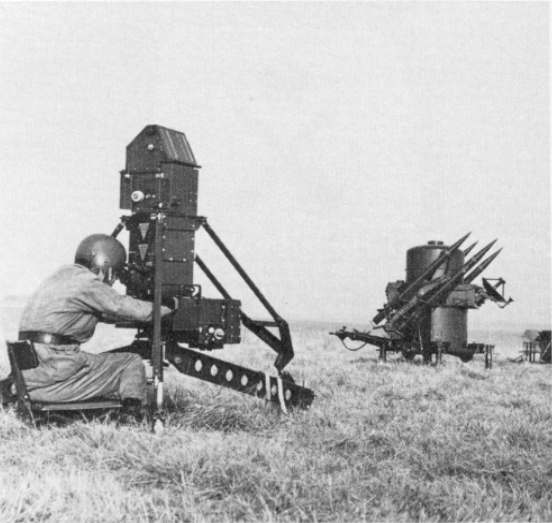
A Rapier missile system

The Royal Marines normally kept war reserves both afloat and ashore, but the floating reserve was on Sir Geraint, and had just been unloaded for a routine transfer to another LSL. These were soon reloaded. A request to the Army for assistance for the Commando Logistic Regiment in moving stores from the depots was met by 150 trucks on the first day; 1,500 trucks would ultimately be used. The depots despatched one million operational rations and twelve million ordinary meals. They also supplied 10,000 long tons (10,000 t) of ammunition, 1,260 long tons (1,280 t) of fuel, and 3,880 long tons (3,940 t) of stores. Eventually, 38,000 long tons (39,000 t) would be moved through to the ports. Good weather at Devonport and Portsmouth permitted loading to be carried out in the open without the danger of perishable stores being damaged by rain.

Ships were not combat loaded—loaded in such a way that the weapons, ammunition, equipment and stores that the embarked troops would require on landing were immediately accessible. Most units sent critical equipment to the ports first, and this then became the first equipment loaded, and the last that could be unloaded. Baltic Ferry had munitions stored deep in her holds that could only be retrieved by removing all the other cargo. Most of the 3rd Commando Brigade's ammunition, about 2,000 long tons (2,000 t) of it, was loaded on Elk, making that vessel a particularly vulnerable target.

Wheeled vehicles were not expected to be able to traverse the islands, so most were left behind. The 3rd Commando Brigade did take 54 of the Commando Logistic Regiment's 82 4-ton prime movers, ten of its fifteen fuel trucks, and nine of its forklifts. To make up for the wheeled vehicles, the 3rd Commando Brigade took 75 Bv202 tracked vehicles. These were fetched from Scotland by British Rail, the only use of rail during the initial deployment, because British Rail required seven days notice to reposition its rolling stock. Some 44 special trains were hired in the second week. All vehicles were loaded fully fuelled with two full 20-litre (4.4 imp gal) jerry cans, a practice normally prohibited as a fire hazard. As it turned out, four-wheel drive vehicles were able to operate on the islands. The Commando Logistic Regiment was missing 383 Commando Petroleum Troop, as this was made up of reservists, who were not called up. Leaving personnel behind reduced the strength of the Commando Logistic Regiment from its normal peacetime strength of over 600 to just 346. The only supplement it received was three Surgical Support Teams. The 3rd Commando Brigade's air defences were bolstered by the addition of T Battery (Shah Sujah's Troop) Royal Artillery, armed with twelve Rapier missile launchers. The logistical implications of deploying and maintaining the battery in the field were not fully appreciated.

== Ascension ==
The task force headed for Ascension Island, a British territory in the mid-Atlantic 3,700 nautical miles (6,900 km; 4,300 mi) from the UK and 3,300 nautical miles (6,100 km; 3,800 mi) from the Falkland Islands. Parts of the island were leased by the US under a 1956 treaty which expired on 20 July 1975, but continued on an annual basis until either government announced its intention to terminate. Neither had done so by 1982. A 1962 exchange of notes obliged the US to provide "logistic, administrative or operating facilities at the airfield" for use by UK military aircraft. Ascension had about a thousand inhabitants, all contractors or employees, or the family members of contractors or employees, of British or American companies that included Cable & Wireless, the BBC, Pan American World Airways (Pan Am) and the US National Aeronautics and Space Administration (NASA). There were about 200 schoolchildren on the island, who were obliged to leave at age 18. Although considered a United States Air Force (USAF) base, the US military garrison consisted of just one man, the base commander, Lieutenant Colonel William D. Bryden.

Wideawake Airfield was built on the island by the US during the Second World War. The runway was extended to 10,000 feet (3,000 m) in 1966 by the USAF to meet the demands of the Eastern Test Range, and the airfield operated on behalf of the US government by Pan Am. Although it had an excellent runway, there was only a small hardstand area for parking aircraft, and no parallel taxiways. In the year prior to April 1982, it handled an average of 24.4 aircraft arrivals per month. Ascension had an anchorage, but no port facilities—just a lone jetty. The island was resupplied on a regular basis by a charter flight, which brought fresh produce, and a freighter, RMS St Helena. When the Falklands War broke out, St Helena was due and the charter flight had just departed. The island was therefore fortuitously well-stocked. There were two shops on the island, run by NAAFI under contract. As such they looked like NAAFI stores, but charged much higher prices. At first these were open to service personnel, but as stocks quickly became low they were placed off limits to them. The Expeditionary Forces Institute (EFI) then established a third shop, exclusively for service personnel. After some delay, space was made available for a weekly supply run for the civilians. Their morale plummeted when it was announced that the Ministry of Defence had chartered St Helena, their only means of shipping baggage, receiving sea mail, and returning to St Helena, which had no airport. MV Stena Inspector and HMS Dumbarton Castle had to be diverted from operational tasks to perform these duties.

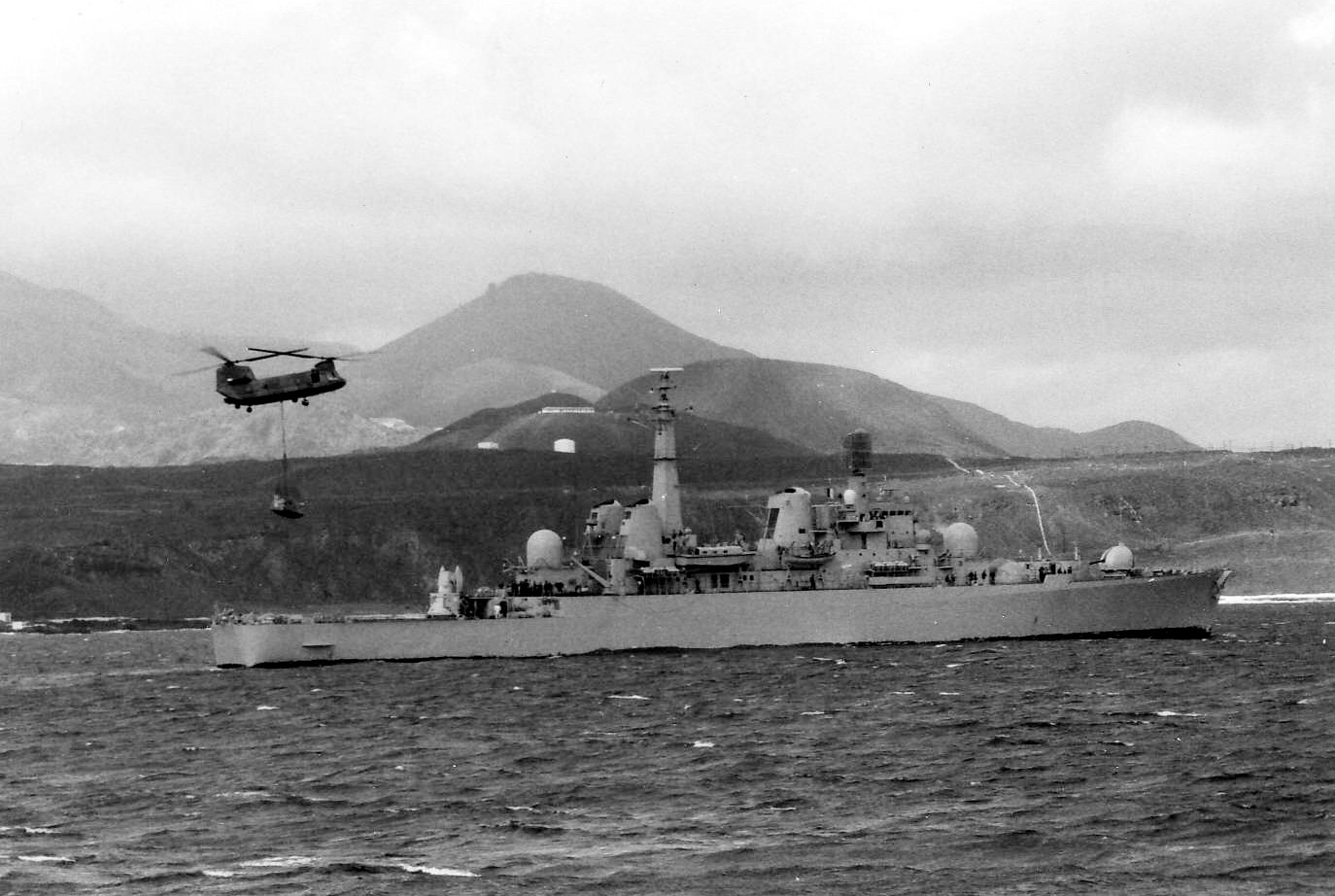
Supplies being delivered to HMS Bristol by a Chinook helicopter during a stopover at Ascension Island on the ship's voyage to the South Atlantic

A dozen RAF Lockheed C-130 Hercules transports flew to Ascension via Gibraltar and Dakar on 3 April, bringing stores and RAF and Royal Navy personnel to establish a base on Ascension. Royal Navy Captain Robert McQueen was appointed to command the British Forces Support Unit (BFSU) on Ascension, and arrived on 8 April. The BFSU ballooned to over 800 personnel in the first three weeks. It began operating Westland Sea King and Wessex helicopters.

Aviation fuel storage facilities on Ascension were controlled by the United States. On 13 April, the US agreed that the British forces could use 950,000 US gallons (3,600,000 L) of the 12.5 million US gallons (47,000,000 L) stored on the island. Some 250,000 US gallons (950,000 L) of this allocation was consumed on 19 April, and just 12,000 US gallons (45,000 L) remained on 25 April when a supply tanker with 2.4 million US gallons (9,100,000 L) commenced replenishment. At this point, the US released its reserve stocks for British use. Fuel was discharged from tankers through a floating pipeline to an American fuel farm. It then needed to be transported 3.5 miles (5.6 km) to Wideawake Airfield. Tanker trucks found the island's steep and rough road heavy going. The compacted volcanic rock used to surface the roads was abrasive, and tyres soon wore out. New sets had to be flown in. Sappers of 1 Troop, 51 Field Squadron, Royal Engineers, built a pipeline to connect the fuel farm with the storage tanks at the airfield. Meanwhile, 12 Petroleum Operations Section, Royal Army Ordnance Corps, had taken over management of the fuel farm. Fuel storage at Wideawake Airfield was increased by 180,000 US gallons (680,000 L) by the addition of 30,000-US-gallon (110,000 L) fuel bladders.

The RAF presence sharply increased after it was decided to use Ascension as a base for operations. Two Hawker Siddeley Nimrod maritime patrol aircraft arrived on 5 April. These were followed by seventeen Handley Page Victor aerial refuelling tankers and two Avro Vulcan bombers, which conducted raids on the Falkland Islands as part of Operation Black Buck. The first five Victor tankers deployed to Ascension on 18 April, followed by four more the next day. Six more deployed by the end of the month, bringing the Victor tanker force to fourteen, since one had returned to their base at RAF Marham on 26 April. Each was refuelled by another Victor before leaving UK airspace. The station commander at Marham, Group Captain J. S. B. Price, became the senior RAF officer at Ascension. Wing Commander D. W. Maurice-Jones assumed command of the Victor detachment until 22 April, when he was relieved by Wing Commander A. W. Bowman, the commander of No. 57 Squadron RAF.

The number of personnel on the island increased to about one thousand, of whom around 120 were Navy, 60 were British Army, and 800 were RAF. This exceeded the capacity of the island's water supply, and McQueen instituted draconian measures to limit the number of personnel on Ascension Island, in some cases sending people back on the planes they arrived on. In early May, the USAF flew in fourteen planeloads of portable accommodation in the form of 31 twelve-man living units. Each was self-contained, with its own air-conditioning, bunks, showers and toilets. They were erected in five days by British and American personnel. The Army's 30 Signal Regiment established direct telephone circuits to the UK, and Detachments of 2 Postal & Courier Regiment, Royal Engineers provided mail and courier services. By June, some 20,000 mailbags had passed through Ascension. A detachment of 9 Ordnance Battalion established laundry facilities in a disused laundry. Service cooks from all three services prepared a thousand meals per day through three field kitchens. Intelligence sources warned of a possible Argentine attack on Ascension, perhaps using special forces and a long-range civilian airliner like a Boeing 707. Concerns about the vulnerability of the base led to three RAF Harriers being assigned for air defence on 10 May. These were replaced by McDonnell Douglas F-4 Phantom IIs on 24 May.

Hermes reached Ascension on 16 April, followed by Fearless, Stromness and the five LSLs the following day. Canberra and Elk arrived on 20 April, having refuelled at Freetown. By this time, cargo planes were arriving at Wideawake Airfield at a rate of eight per day, and 1,500 long tons (1,500 t) of supplies had arrived, a third of which were earmarked for the 3rd Commando Brigade. Stores were difficult to identify, as many were poorly labelled, making it difficult to distinguish real ammunition from training ammunition. When cargo was not properly logged on arrival, it became difficult to know whether or not an item had been delivered. There was no security at the airfield, so goods were subject to pilferage. D Squadron, 22 Special Air Service Regiment, helped themselves to special ammunition and weapons belonging to the 3rd Commando Brigade, which they thought were just lying around.

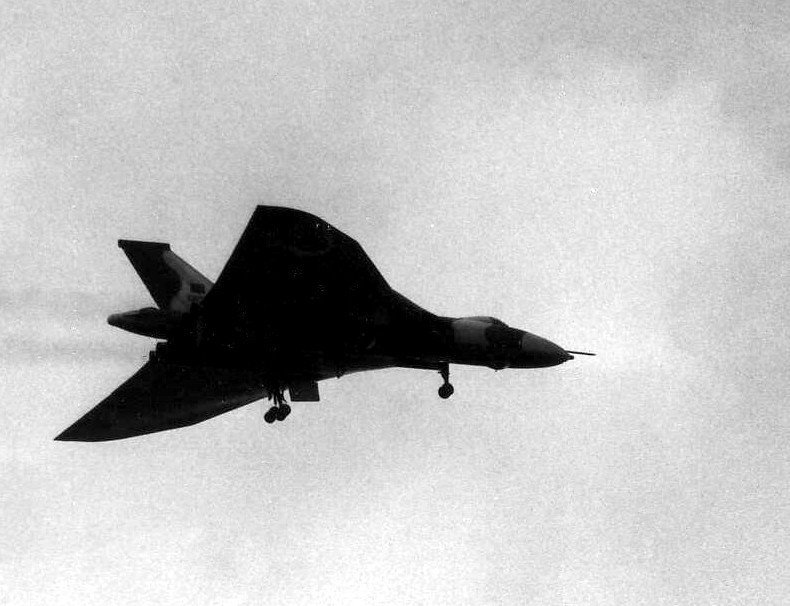
An Avro Vulcan bomber over Ascension Island on 18 May 1982

The amphibious force took the opportunity to re-stow its equipment. This took eleven days. Having not yet refuelled, Fearless rode too high in the water, and was unable to launch its LCUs, so the burden of the effort initially had to be carried by helicopters. Two Wessexes, three Sea Kings and a Boeing CH-47 Chinook supported the effort. Shortages of lifting gear and cargo nets hampered the effort, as did the haphazard original stowage of stores. In some cases, cargo had shifted during the voyage to Ascension. Some 138 Wessex, 40 Chinook and 40 Sea King sorties were flown on a single day. The LSLs Sir Galahad and Sir Percivale were stocked with two days' supply of ammunition, fuel and rations. Four more days' supply was stowed on Stromness, and sixteen on Elk. Units were issued with supplies and equipment they would require for an amphibious assault.

Meanwhile, Intrepid, Atlantic Conveyor, Norland and Europic Ferry departed the UK on 25 and 26 April, and Sir Bedivere, which reached Marchwood on 25 April, sailed for Ascension on 27 April. The five LSLs, carrying most of the Commando Logistic Regiment, weighed anchor and set out for the Falkland Islands on 1 May, along with Pearleaf and escorted by the frigate HMS Antelope. Norland arrived at Ascension on the morning of 7 May, and departed for the Falklands that evening. Canberra, Tidepool and Elk had left the previous day, and the last ship, the LPD Intrepid, departed Ascension on 8 May.

To allow ships to be resupplied by air when operating in the South Atlantic, modifications were made to the Hercules aircraft, which normally had a range of about 2,000 miles (3,200 km). At RAF Lyneham, Hercules transports were fitted with pairs of 825-imperial-gallon (3,750 L) auxiliary fuel tanks, thereby extending their range by three or four hours. Adding four tanks increased the range further still, but reduced the cargo carrying capacity by 75 per cent. These modified Hercules aircraft became known as LR2 and LR4 variants, depending on how many auxiliary tanks had been installed. They were also modified to allow for aerial refuelling by the addition of refuelling probes taken from Vulcan bombers. In the search for refuelling probes, they were taken from Vulcans at the Royal Air Force Museum London, Imperial War Museum Duxford, Castle Air Museum in California, and the Strategic Air Command & Aerospace Museum in Nebraska. The Hercules transports were the first propeller-driven aircraft to be refuelled by Victor tankers. The difference in the speeds required skilful flying. A Victor would approach a Hercules from above and aft at 23,000 feet (7,000 m). The Hercules would then descend at 500 feet (150 m) per minute. At full throttle, this allowed the Hercules to reach 230 to 240 knots (430 to 440 km/h), the minimum speed of the Victor. Refuelling took about 15 minutes, by which time they would have descended to 8,000 feet (2,400 m), but occasionally it took longer and they descended as low as 2,000 feet (610 m).

Part of 47 Air Despatch Squadron, Royal Corps of Transport, went to Ascension on Fearless. They prepared their first packages for airdropping on 19 April, of high priority supplies for HMS Alacrity and Invincible. The first LR2 Hercules arrived at Wideawake Airfield on 12 May, and four days later a 24-hour, 6,300-nautical-mile (11,700 km) flight delivered 1,000 pounds (450 kg) of supplies to Antelope. A flight to the Falkland Islands would take 28 hours, so two crews were needed, and required five Victor tankers for aerial refuelling. McQueen tried to enforce a policy that airdrop loads be rigged in the UK to save space at Ascension, but was overruled by Fieldhouse. By 1 June, 47 Air Despatch Squadron had prepared 47 loads totalling 163 long tons (166 t), with high priority items delivered within 40 hours of the initial request. Airdrop missions mounted from Ascension were given girls' names, in ascending alphabetical order. After "Zara" was flown on 9 June, the sequence started again with "Alison" the following day. While most airdrops were at sea, some were made to units in the Falkland Islands. Those at sea were made with the stores in waterproof containers which were retrieved by the ships' boats. Occasionally personnel were also dropped. In the "Ursula" mission on 1 June, Lieutenant Colonel David Chaundler, a replacement commander for 2 Para, parachuted into the sea and was plucked from the water by a boat from the frigate HMS Penelope.

== Over the beach ==
Key locations and the routes taken by British land forces during the Falklands War. IR = Infantry Regiment; Cdo = Commando; SAS = Special Air Service; SBS = Special Boat Squadron; M&AW = Mountain and Arctic Warfare Cadre

=== Landing ===
The plan for an amphibious landing in the Falkland Islands, codenamed Operation Sutton, called for units to land from the ships in which they had sailed, which meant that 40 Commando, 42 Commando and 3 Para would land from Canberra; but Fieldhouse became concerned about risking 2,000 men on one ship. On 18 May, Clapp received orders for different battalions to be carried on separate ships. Unusually calm seas on 19 May allowed this cross-decking to be carried out by LCUs and LCVPs from Fearless and Intrepid, with 40 Commando transferred to the former, and 3 Para to the latter. Both LPDs were seriously overloaded, and, unlike Canberra, did not have enough life rafts for everyone. After sunset an 846 Naval Air Squadron Sea King from Hermes transferring troops of D Squadron, 22 Special Air Service Regiment, to Intrepid crashed into the ocean. Intrepid's LCVPs rescued eight men, but 22 others were lost.

Another change was that the Commando Logistic Regiment wanted the LSLs beached so they could be quickly unloaded. Clapp demurred. If done improperly, this could damage the ship. For this reason, peacetime financial restraints had prevented the LSL captains from practising this manoeuvre. Clapp ruled that the LSLs would discharge onto mexeflotes and landing craft through the stern doors. The LSLs had been loaded with the most urgently required stores in the bow, where they could be accessed first, but now the order needed to be changed. The double-handling required meant that unloading would be slower than planned.

The logistics plan called for the support elements of the combat units, known as the B Echelons, to remain afloat, along with the entire Commando Logistic Regiment. After the beachhead was secured, the B Echelons would join their units. Lieutenant Colonel Ivar Hellberg, the commander of the Commando Logistic Regiment, and Major Gerry Wells-Cole, the 3rd Commando Brigade's Deputy Assistant Adjutant and Quartermaster General (DAA & QMG), would select a Brigade Maintenance Area (BMA) site near Ajax Bay to be run by the Commando Logistic Regiment. Engineers would establish a refuelling point for Harriers and helicopters, and establish water points.

Hellberg and Wells-Cole planned to use a "pull" system whereby unit quartermasters would request supplies that they needed. There would be no equipment repair facilities ashore; the Commando Logistic Regiment's Workshop Squadron would remain afloat, with detachments going ashore temporarily to retrieve or repair equipment as necessary. Medical support was supplied by No. 1 Medical Troop on Sir Galahad, the Parachute Clearing Troop of the 16th (Parachute) Field Ambulance on Norland, and No. 3 Medical Troop, No. 2 Surgical Support Team and the Commando Logistic Regiment's Medical Squadron on Canberra. After the beachhead was secure, No. 1 Medical Troop and the Parachute Clearing Troop would establish a field dressing station in the BMA. Casualties could be flown to Uganda, and then taken to Montevideo by HMS Hecate, Hydra and Hecla, from whence they would be flown back to the UK via Ascension. The dead would be buried in the BMA or at sea.

The amphibious force entered Falkland Sound shortly after midnight local time on 21 May, delayed by mists and navigational difficulties. One of Fearless's ballast pumps broke down, slowing the start of dock operations. Four LCUs from Intrepid collected 2 Para from Norland, while 40 Commando boarded four LCVPs and four LCUs; the LCVPs were needed because two of its LCUs were carrying a FV101 Scorpion and a FV107 Scimitar. 2 Para was slow boarding the LCUs, as this had not been practised, and one man suffered a crushed pelvis when he fell between the ship and an LCU. The various mishaps caused H-hour to be postponed by an hour. Guided by Major Ewen Southby-Tailyour, they landed at San Carlos Water, (Blue Beach) at 03:30. They then secured the high ground of the Sussex Mountains, establishing a reverse slope defence. Meanwhile, the landing craft returned to take 45 Commando from Intrepid and Stromness to Ajax Bay (Red Beach), and 3 Para from Intrepid to Port San Carlos (Green Beach). 42 Commando remained on Canberra as a reserve. Delays in landing the first wave meant that the second was about two hours late, with 3 Para landing at 07:30.

=== Build-up ===
Daylight allowed helicopter operations to begin. On 21 May, helicopters carried 288 loads, moving 520 personnel and 220 long tons (220 t) of stores from 11 ships to 21 sites. STUFT were unloaded at a rate of 20 long tons (20 t) per hour, and the LSLs could be unloaded at 90 long tons (91 t) per hour, the lesson being that STUFT were a poor substitute for purpose-built amphibious vessels. Priority was given to moving the six L118 light guns of 79 Commando Battery, 29th Commando Regiment Royal Artillery, ashore. Moving a battery with 500 rounds per gun required 85 Sea King sorties. The next priority was to position the Rapiers of T battery, but owing to the delays in the landing, the Rapier sites were not secured until around midday. Generally located on hilltops where there were no roads or tracks, the Rapiers had to be sited by helicopter. If they had to be moved, whether yards or miles, another helicopter sortie was called for. No one knew for certain what the effect of seven weeks' sea voyage would be on the equipment, but the need for air defence was obvious, as the Argentine air forces made repeated attacks on ships in Falkland Sound. Two Gazelle helicopters were lost.

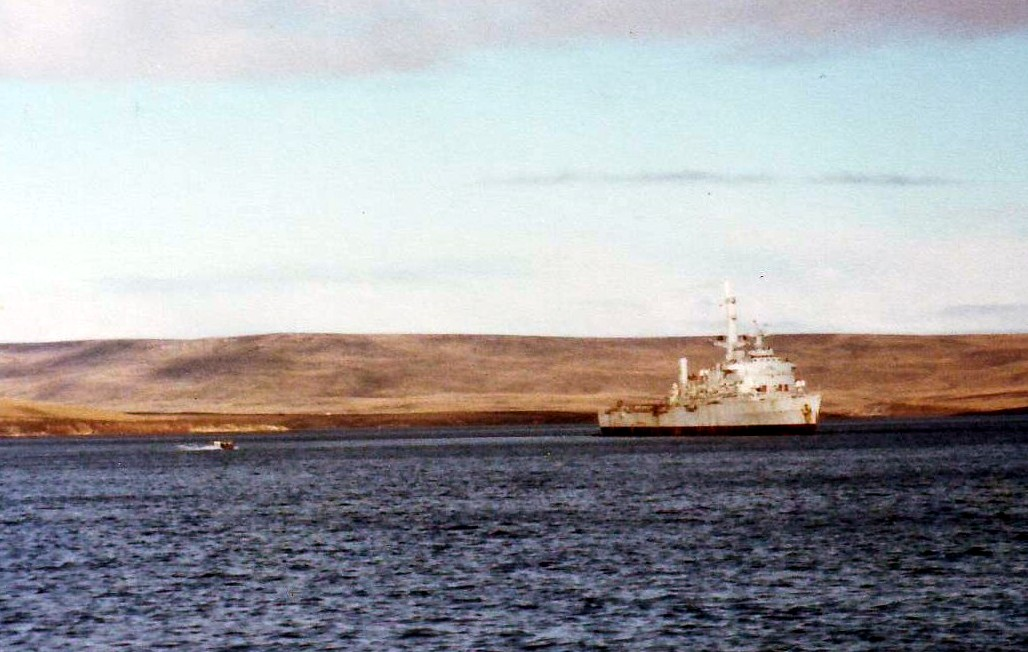
HMS Fearless at San Carlos in 1982

Of the seven escorts, five, HMS Antrim, Ardent, Argonaut, Brilliant and Broadsword, were hit; only HMS Plymouth and Yarmouth were unscathed. Of those hit, only Broadsword was fully capable of continuing the fight, while Ardent was ablaze and sinking. Clapp decided that the sound was too dangerous for STUFT, and ordered that Canberra, Norland and Europic Ferry leave Falkland Sound by midnight. The LSLs remained, but on 23 May Argentine bombs found Sir Bedivere, Sir Galahad and Sir Lancelot. None of those that struck the LSLs exploded. Damage to Sir Bedivere was minor, but Sir Galahad was set on fire and beached, and was put out of action for a week. Fires started on Sir Lancelot, which put it out of action until 7 June—although in the meantime she acted as an accommodation ship and helicopter refuelling station. Clapp decided that the remaining stores had to be landed as quickly as possible. Inevitably, some stores that were neither requested nor required were landed.

This disrupted the logistics plan. 42 Commando came ashore at Green Beach by LCU, but the B Echelons remained on Canberra, and the assault troops had left rucksacks, parkas, sleeping and cooking gear, and spare clothing behind. Canberra and Norland also took 90,000 rations with them. The BMA was far from ideal. There was a landing ramp where forklifts could unload landing craft, but unusable rocky ground limited the area available to about a third of what was really required to properly disperse the stores, and the only cover was a disused refrigeration plant on the shore of Ajax Bay, which had been taken over by the hospital.

Commander Rick Jolly brought No. 2 Surgical Support Team and the Headquarters of the Commando Logistic Regiment's Medical Squadron ashore from Canberra. No. 1 Medical Troop disembarked from Sir Galahad, and the Parachute Clearing Troop had already come ashore from Norland. With these units he set up a field hospital in the refrigeration plant. They decided not to paint a Red Cross on the building, as it was close to the ordnance stores. A sign painted over the entrance proclaimed it to be "The Red and Green Life Machine", alluding to the colour of the paratroopers' and commandos' berets. A "Water Heater, Field Kitchen, Portable" was the sole source of hot water for the surgical team at Ajax Bay. It was loaned from an American unit for a crate of beer; the British kit they were supposed to use never made it ashore. Of 1,205 men treated, including 310 who required major surgery, 3 died.

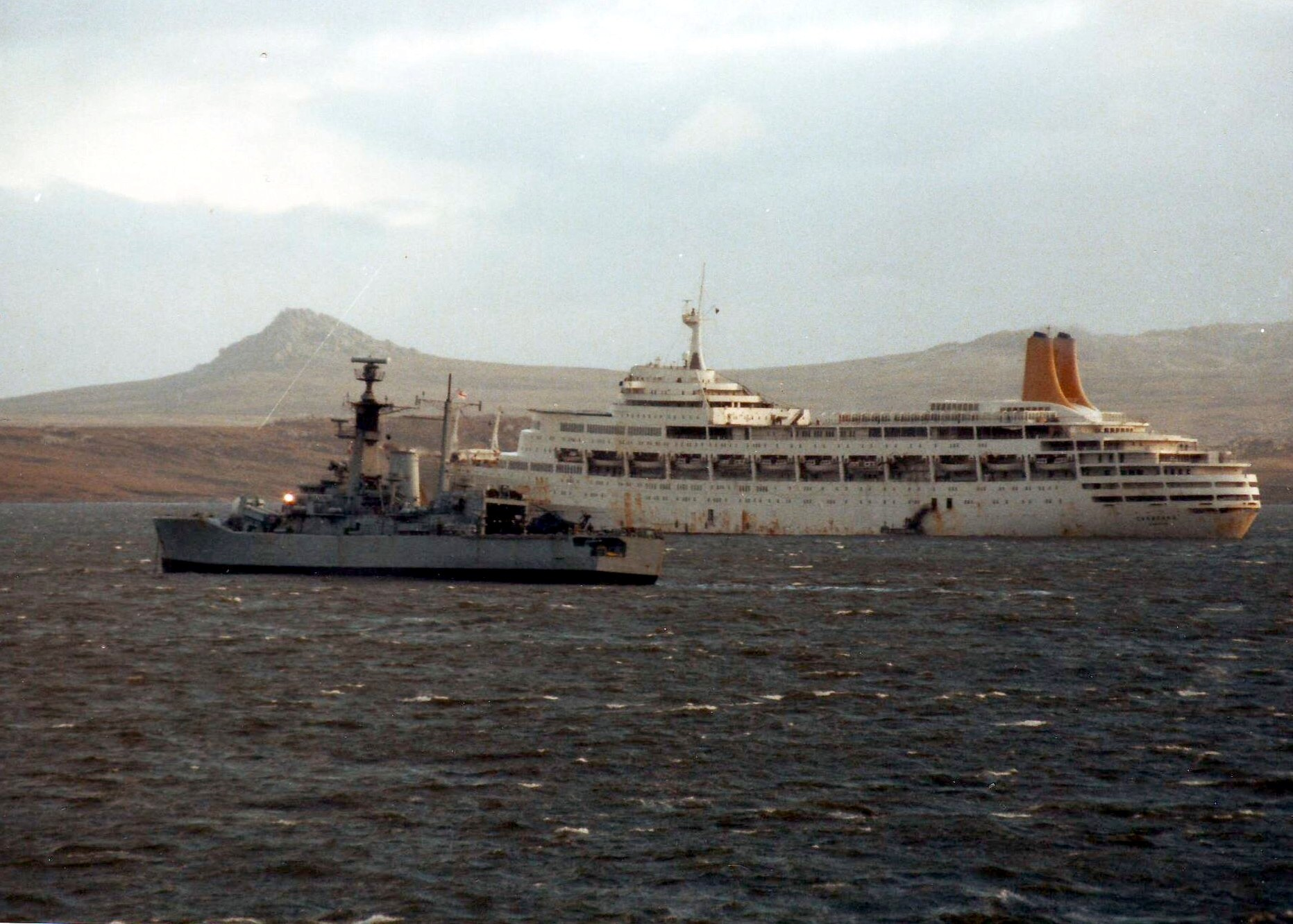
Troop transport SS Canberra and frigate HMS Andromeda in the Falklands in June 1982

Atlantic Conveyor was struck by an Exocet anti-ship missile on the afternoon of 25 May and set ablaze. Although she remained afloat for several days, nothing could be salvaged. She was the most serious loss of the campaign. Twelve of those on board died, but 150 were rescued. Of the aircraft she had brought to the South Atlantic, the Harriers of No. 1 Squadron RAF had already been transferred to Hermes, a Wessex of 848 Naval Air Squadron had already flown ashore, and a Chinook of No. 18 Squadron RAF was in the air at the time. The rest, three Chinook and six Wessex helicopters, were lost.

The lone surviving Chinook landed on Hermes. It spent the night there, arrived at San Carlos the next day, and was made available for missions on 29 May. The Chinook arrived with two aircrews, and a maintenance detachment, but they had no tools, spare parts or documentation, all of which were lost with Atlantic Conveyor. Somehow, it went on to fly 109 hours without servicing, carrying 1,500 troops, 95 casualties, 650 Argentine prisoners of war (POWs) and 540 long tons (550 t) of cargo. At one point it carried 81 paratroops in a single load, and then returned to fetch another 75, and it survived being accidentally flown into the sea one night during a snowstorm.

In addition to the helicopters, Atlantic Conveyor took with her four tent camps, complete with field kitchens and sanitary facilities, which would have accommodated 4,500 personnel. Another serious loss was a portable fuelling system and six 10-long-ton (10 t) fuel tanks. Material for building an airstrip at Port San Carlos also went down, but 59 Independent Commando Squadron Royal Engineers managed to build it anyway, using matting earmarked for repairing Port Stanley Airport. All ships were unloaded by 27 May, leaving only the two damaged LSLs at San Carlos.

== Over the mountains ==
=== 3rd Commando Brigade ===
North east of the Total Exclusion Zone (TEZ) that the British government had declared around the Falkland Islands, the Royal Navy designated a Tug, Repair and Logistics Area (TRALA) where ships could receive and transfer supplies, and conduct repairs of battle damage under the protection of the carrier battle group. Hercules airdrops were made to ships there. Ships were now held in the TRALA, from whence it took about 20 hours to reach San Carlos. Their captains preferred to navigate Falkland Sound by night, allowing them to be unloaded by day, which suited the Commando Logistic Regiment. Working around the clock was inadvisable, for there were no relief crews for the landing craft or helicopters.

Only four Sea Kings had night vision equipment, allowing them to operate at night. These were reserved for night operations; to allow the crews to rest, and necessary aircraft maintenance to be performed, they were not employed during the day. One Sea King was permanently assigned to support of the Rapier battery. This left six Sea King, five Wessex and the Chinook helicopter available for logistical and tactical missions.

Requested supplies took at least two days to fetch from the TRALA. Hellberg visited Clapp on Fearless each night and presented a list of required ships. Clapp would then signal Woodward and ask for them; but for operational reasons a requested ship might not arrive, or a substitute might be sent containing none of the required stores. The Ordnance Squadron of the Commando Logistic Regiment had compiled lists of what was on board each ship, but lacked the manpower to maintain teams on all the supply ships. Goods became damaged from improper storage or handling, or were pilfered, and the contents of the ships slowly became less certain. RFA Resource carried stores for both the Royal Navy and the 3rd Commando Brigade, and with no-one to assess conflicting priorities, she remained with the fleet.

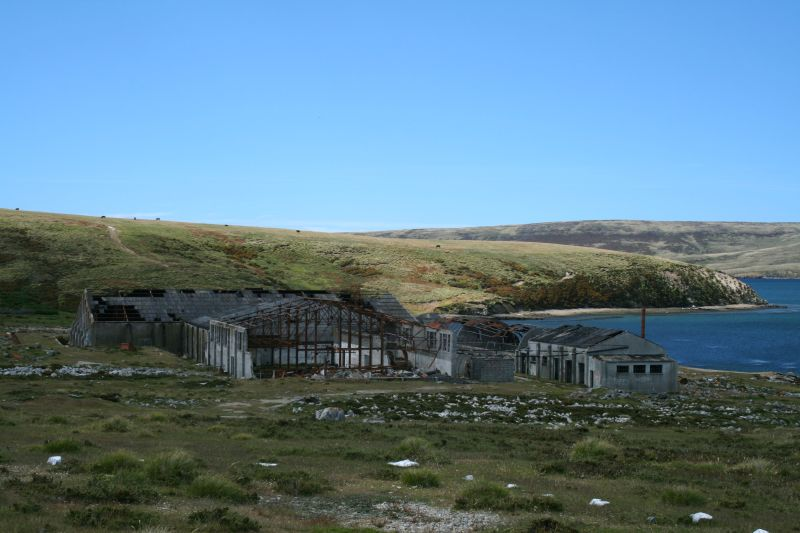
The former refrigeration plant in Ajax Bay, site of the 1982 field hospital. (By 2008, it had fallen into the disrepair seen here.)

The provision of fuel posed a special challenge. The Rapier batteries required fuel to keep their generators running, and their isolated sites required the full-time service of a Sea King to keep them going. The Bv202s consumed fuel at a high rate because the operators kept them running constantly to keep warm and keep the radio batteries charged. The problem was not one of availability—there was ample fuel available on ships—but of distribution. The 3rd Commando Brigade's 10,000-litre (2,200 imp gal) collapsible pillow tank was holed by cannon shells from an Argentine fighter as it was being brought ashore on a mexeflote. The tanker trucks could be used to bring the fuel ashore on mexeflotes or landing craft, but it still needed to be decanted into jerry cans. There was no special equipment for this, so hand pumps had to be used. Daily consumption was 698 jerry cans, of which 160 were for the Rapiers, 378 for the Bv202s, 106 for Land Rovers and 54 for cooking. The 3rd Commando Brigade brought 1,880 jerry cans with it, of which 1,000 were empty, 600 were full, and 280 filled and carried on vehicles. The procedure was for an empty jerry can to be handed over for a full one, but it was impractical to deny a unit fuel for not producing a jerry can. The 5th Infantry Brigade arrived with another 1,000 empty jerry cans, having been prohibited from loading full ones on its ships.

Stromness brought the Emergency Fuel Handling Equipment (EFHE) on 23 May. This had been loaded on multiple ships, and not all the components could be located; but the 59 Independent Commando Squadron was still able to rig it. A Dracone Barge was moored offshore, and piping attached that allowed aviation fuel to be pumped into collapsible tanks ashore. This allowed helicopters to refuel ashore, eliminating the need to land on the LPDs, which had two helipads, or the LSLs, which had one each, for refuelling, for which they competed with the 15 light helicopters of 3 Commando Brigade Air Squadron.

On 24 May, 11 Field Squadron commenced work on an airstrip to allow Harriers to refuel as well. The plant and equipment earmarked for this was lost on Atlantic Conveyor, but Stromness had 10-by-2-foot (3.05 by 0.61 m) aluminium panels for airfield surfacing, which were landed at Green Beach by helicopter and landing craft, and taken to the site with civilian vehicles. The airstrip was completed, with a ski jump for Harriers, assembled by hand, on 2 June. The absence of 383 Commando Petroleum Troop, though, meant that there was no one to operate the fuel points until the 5th Infantry Brigade arrived. Its attached 91 Ordnance Company had a petroleum platoon, the only regular army one based in the UK. These specialists took over the EFHE at Port San Carlos as soon as they arrived on 3 June, allowing Harriers to be refuelled there from 5 June. It was damaged by a Harrier that crash landed on 8 June, but was repaired. Over 150 operational sorties were flown from the airstrip between 5 and 14 June.

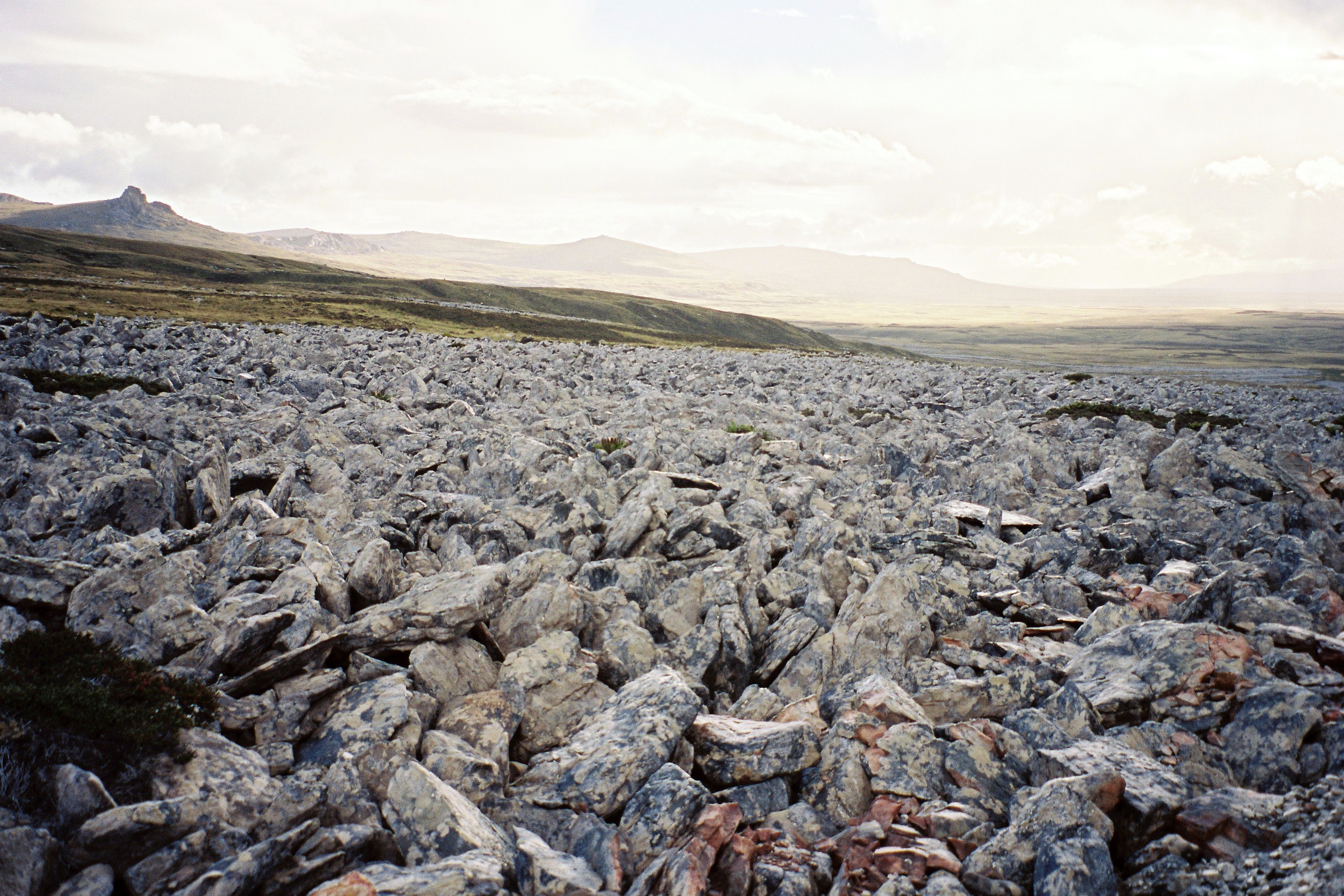
Stone run near Mount Kent. These can go on for miles.

Argentine air attacks were initially directed at the ships, but on 27 May four Douglas A-4 Skyhawks attacked the BMA, dropping twelve bombs, only four of which exploded. Six men were killed and thirty wounded. The field hospital was struck by two 400-kilogram (880 lb) bombs, neither of which exploded. They would remain in place, sandbagged and defuzed, for the rest of the campaign. Bombs that struck the ordnance area set off stockpiles of 105 mm artillery shells, MILAN missiles and 81 mm mortar bombs. The Commando Logistic Regiment had no fire fighting equipment, so the fire was left to burn itself out, and explosions continued through the night. All of 45 Commando's MILAN missiles were lost, along with two hundred 81 mm mortar bombs and three hundred 105 mm artillery rounds.

The Battle of Goose Green on 28 and 29 May confirmed what logisticians had suspected and feared; the expenditure of ammunition was not only five times greater than that expected in a limited war, it exceeded that forecast for an all-out war against the Warsaw Pact. Another 30 days' supply had been ordered on 17 April, and was on its way south, but by the evening of 28 May, the BMA held just eighty-three 105 mm artillery rounds, thirty MILAN missiles, two days' supply of ten-man ration packs and three days' of medical stores, and no one-man ration packs, cooking fuel or spare clothing. The ration situation was exacerbated when 2 Para captured nearly a thousand Argentine prisoners at Goose Green, all of whom had to be fed. Since the tents were lost on Atlantic Conveyor, they had to be kept in the disused refrigeration plant during the night. The Argentine wounded put more pressure on the medical supplies, and the Argentine dead had to be disposed of, although the task force had no graves unit. The Commando Logistic Regiment buried them in a mass grave near Darwin.

After the war, Thompson reflected that:

The majority of senior officers and their staffs were handicapped by a dearth of understanding of the logistic realities of fighting a conventional war. Brush fire wars and Northern Ireland had provided few logistic problems, and most peacetime exercises, with their emphasis on tactical movement, teach false logistic lessons. Commanders on these exercises are seldom faced with the choice between moving men, and moving bullets, beans and fuel. In war, if helicopters are in short supply, and for some reason other means of movement are not available, or cannot be used, the men will walk carrying some of the beans and bullets, and helicopters will be almost exclusively employed carrying the rest.

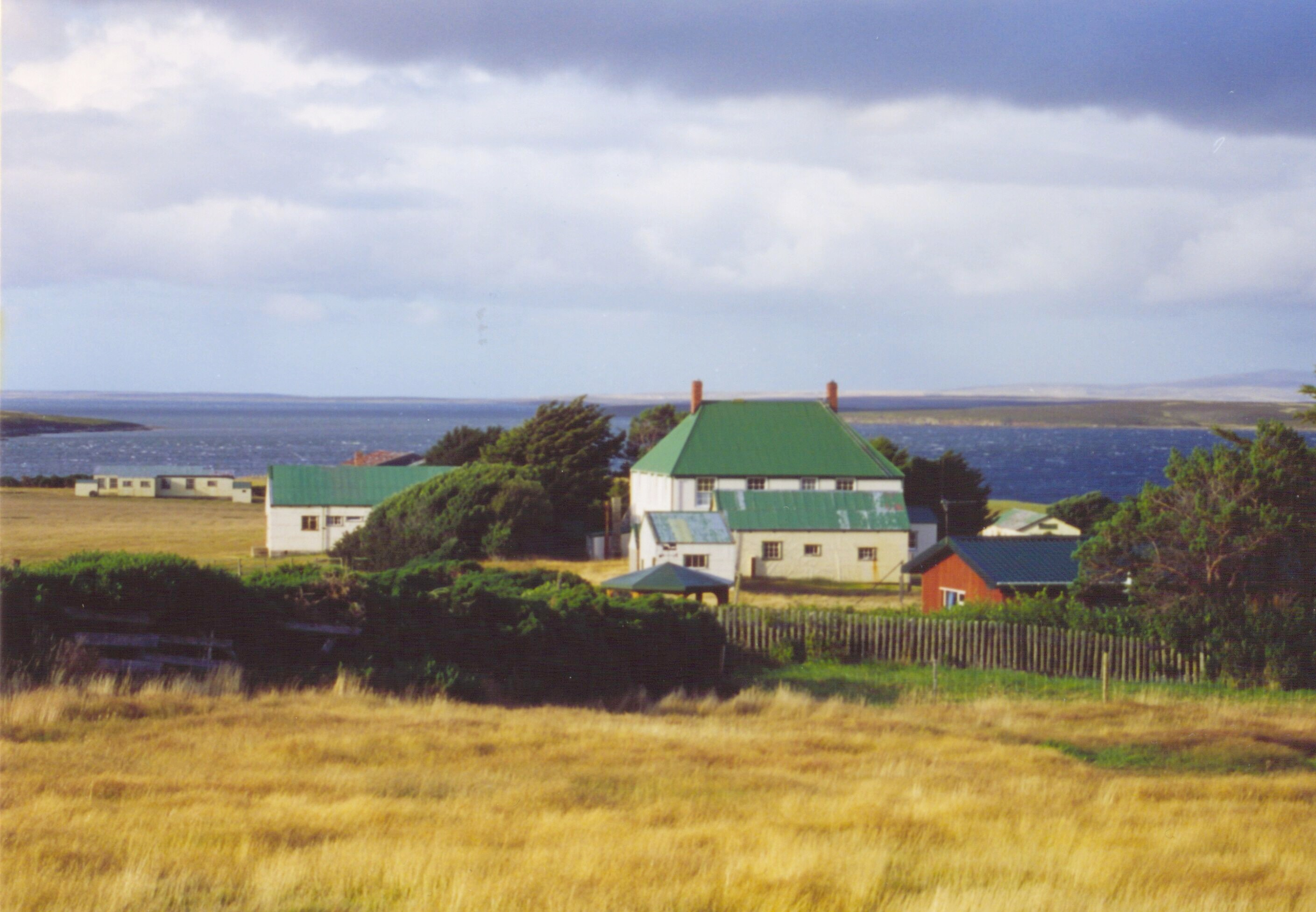
Teal Inlet settlement

At first light on 27 May, 45 Commando embarked in LCUs that took it from Ajax Bay to Port San Carlos. It then conducted a loaded march (which the commandos called a "yomp" and the paras called a "tab") to Douglas. Every man carried about 120 pounds (54 kg); some carried far more. Douglas was reached at 13:00 on 28 May. 3 Para set out from Port San Carlos at 11:00 on 27 May, and reached the Arroy Pedro River, 9 kilometres (5.6 mi) from Teal Inlet, at 11:00 on 28 May. The paras waited until night-fall before advancing on Teal Inlet, which was secured by 23:00. They were joined on the morning of 29 May by the Scorpion and Scimitar light tanks of No. 4 Troop, Blues and Royals, whose departure from Port San Carlos had been delayed by a temporary fuel shortage which had occurred when Sir Lancelot jettisoned all its motor transport fuel on discovering an unexploded bomb on board. Once fuel was secured, they were able to make the journey to Teal Inlet, arriving on the morning of 29 May. 3 Para and 45 Commando were then ordered to advance to Estancia.

Helicopters resupplied 3 Para, and brought its mortars and support weapons. Estancia House was taken on 31 May, with 3 Para utilising local farm tractors to move its stores and heavy equipment. An attempt to fly 42 Commando and three 105 mm guns to Mount Kent on 29/30 May ran into a blizzard and was forced to return to Port San Carlos. A second attempt the following night succeeded. With the high ground overlooking Teal Inlet in British hands, a Forward Brigade Maintenance Area (FBMA) was established there, with a Distribution Point (DP) at Estancia. Supplies were delivered to the FBMA by LSL, and then moved to the DP by Bv202, requisitioned local farm tractor or helicopter. A Forward Arming and Refuelling Point (FARP) at Teal Inlet saved the helicopters from having to make a 90-to-100-mile (140 to 160 km) round trip for replenishment.

=== 5th Infantry Brigade ===
Brigadier Tony Wilson's 5th Infantry Brigade reached Cumberland Bay off South Georgia Island on Queen Elizabeth 2 on 27 May. The politicians were nervous about the political repercussions if the ship were lost, so it was decided to unload it here, and move the brigade to the Falkland Islands in other ships. The Queen Elizabeth 2 was met by a veritable fleet of ships that proceeded to unload her passengers and cargo. The trawler cum minesweepers HMS Cordella, Farnella, Junella, Northella and Pict ferried the infantry and the 16th (Parachute) Field Ambulance across to Canberra and Norland, which departed for San Carlos at 21:00 on 28 May. Cargo was unloaded onto Stromness, Resource, Saxonia, Lycaon, Leeds Castle, British Esk, and British Tay.

A false warning of an attack by Argentine forces caused Queen Elizabeth 2 to weigh anchor and set sail for the UK on 29 May. So difficult was it to unload the ship that around 70 per cent of the brigade's 81 mm mortar and 105 mm artillery rounds remained on board. Stromness headed for San Carlos with most of the logistics units. Inclement weather made what would normally be a two-day voyage into a four-day one. Moore established his headquarters on Fearless on 29 May, and assumed control of land battle the following day. Atlantic Causeway, with twenty Wessex and eight Sea King helicopters, arrived at San Carlos on 1 June, and Canberra and Norland followed the next day.

The logistics units that arrived with the 5th Infantry Brigade included 81 Ordnance Company, which supplied most services, and 91 Ordnance Company, a third line unit that included a laundry section, bath unit, and field bakery, and most importantly, the petroleum platoon. 10 Field Workshop provided maintenance support, but most of its equipment was on Baltic Ferry and Nordic Ferry, which departed without unloading due to another air raid alert. The unit, therefore, spent much of its time guarding POWs. 407 Transport Troop brought 20 Snow Tracs, predecessors of the Bv202s, but only six were landed in the first few days. There was also 160 Provost Company, Royal Military Police and 6 Field Cash Office, Royal Army Pay Corps. These logistic units constituted an augmentation of the Commando Logistic Regiment, rather than the logistic support required by a brigade engaged in combat operations.

As a result, the 5th Infantry Brigade's arrival in the Falklands meant that the Commando Logistic Regiment became responsible for supporting two large brigades with a total strength of around 9,000 personnel. This placed stress on the regiment, as it was structured to support only the 3rd Commando Brigade's 3,000 personnel, and it had deployed to the Falklands with less than its usual allocations of manpower and transport.

The 230-gross-register-ton (650 m^{3}) coastal vessel MV Monsunen was used by the Argentines until she was found by British troops stranded at Goose Green after the surrender of the Argentine garrison. The coaster had been forced aground west of Lively Island when Yarmouth attempted to capture her on 23 May, and had to be towed to safety by Forrest, another supply ship commandeered by the Argentine Navy. Monsunen was salvaged by a prize crew from Fearless, and used to supplement the 5th Infantry Brigade's transport.

While the 3rd Commando Brigade advanced on Port Stanley on a northerly axis, the 5th Infantry Brigade advanced on a southerly one. The plan was to establish a second FBMA at Fitzroy, with a DP at Bluff Cove. It was nowhere near as good as Teal Inlet. The route from Port San Carlos went all the way around Lafonia, a distance that landing craft and mexeflotes could not cover on their own. While the LPDs were fast enough to get there and back in darkness, the LSLs could not. Moreover, unlike at Teal Inlet, the Argentinians held the high ground overlooking it.

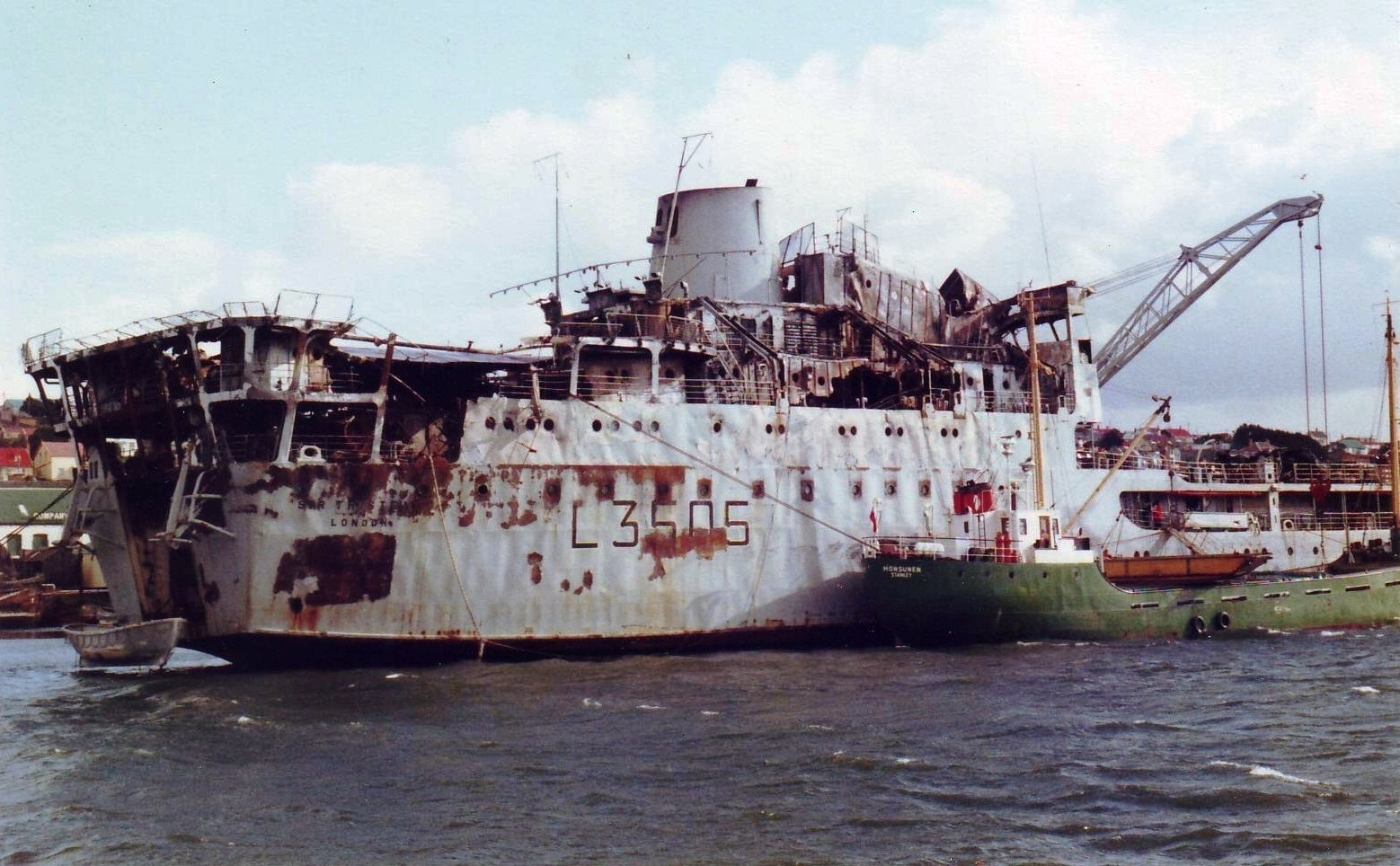
RFA Sir Tristram showing damage inflicted in the Bluff Cove Air Attacks. The green vessel alongside her is the Monsunen.

As a result, Sir Galahad and Sir Tristram were caught unloading in daylight on 8 June and attacked by Argentine aircraft, and both were set ablaze. The fires on Sir Tristram soon burned themselves out, and some of the cargo was saved; ultimately, the ship was salvaged. But Sir Galahad was a total loss. The disaster cost 49 men their lives; another 115 were wounded. Among the dead were four Chinese crewmen. The field hospital was flooded with casualties, and arrangements were made for landing craft to send two dozen each to Fearless, Intrepid and Atlantic Causeway; others were flown to Uganda. That same day, one of the LCUs from Fearless was caught in open water in daylight, and attacked and sunk by Argentine aircraft, killing six men. On board were six Land Rovers carrying the 5th Brigade's communications equipment.

For the final battles around Port Stanley, the gun positions were stocked with 500 rounds per gun, plus another 500 in reserve. Each combat unit would have two days' supply, plus two more days at the FBMAs at Fitzroy or Teal Inlet. The remaining LSLs made runs to Fitzroy and Teal Inlet on alternating days, moving over 1,000 long tons (1,000 t) to each. The arrival of four more Wessex helicopters on Engadine brought the number of helicopters available to forty; these were used to move ammunition to the gun positions. FARPs at each FBMA saved the helicopters from having to return to San Carlos. The field hospital was broken up on 10 June, with teams deploying to Fitzroy and Teal Inlet.

The final four-day battle around Port Stanley involved some of the hardest fighting of the campaign. One battery almost ran out of ammunition, requiring an emergency helicopter resupply mission in a snowstorm at night. The lone bridge over the Murrell River collapsed when an armoured recovery vehicle loaded with ammunition attempted to cross it, cutting the 3rd Commando Brigade's overland supply line for their Bv202s, but the engineers built an air-portable bridge at Fitzroy which the Chinook delivered.

On 14 June, the Argentine commander, Brigadier General Mario Menéndez surrendered Argentine forces in the Falkland Islands to Moore.

== Aftermath ==
Lieutenant Colonel Leslie Kennedy arrived at San Carlos soon after the Argentine surrender as Commander Royal Engineers (CRE) Works, Falkland Islands. His task was to rehabilitate Port Stanley. It took the sappers of 9 Parachute Squadron and 61 Field Squadron four days to restore the water supply to Port Stanley. By this time, the reservoirs were down to two days' supply. In the meantime it was supplied by Fort Toronto through a dracone moored offshore. A military water supply point at Moody Brook was constructed and operated by 3 Field Squadron. The town's consumption was about 12,000 imperial gallons (55,000 L) per day. The electric grid had also been damaged by shellfire, and took a week longer to repair. Its capacity was still limited, so it was supplemented by two 250 kW Army generators. A separate military power station was subsequently established. Fuel was supplied using a dracone.

Port Stanley on 16 June 1982

The major task was restoration of the port and airfield. In the interim, the Hercules transports continued to fly from Ascension, dropping high priority items. The postal unit moved from Ajax Bay into the Post Office at Port Stanley. At first, mail bags were airdropped but some fell into Argentine minefields. A method was then devised to allow the Hercules to deliver bags without having to land by trailing a grappling hook attached to the bags which snagged a wire strung between two poles.

Built in the 1970s, the airfield had a 4,100-by-150-foot (1,250 by 46 m) runway. It was unusable because it had been cratered by the RAF. Its rehabilitation was undertaken by 11 Field Squadron and 59 Independent Commando Squadron. The Argentinians had already repaired three craters. The others were filled in and topped with Argentine aluminium matting. A huge crater caused by a 1,000-pound (450 kg) bomb required over 1,000 square metres (11,000 sq ft) of matting. "Scabs", or scrapes in the runway surface, of which there were several hundred, were repaired with Bostik 276, a magnesium phosphate cement and aggregate mixture. There were 47 Hercules and several hundred Harrier landings before the airfield was closed for repairs on 15 August.

The runway was too short for use by the RAF's Phantoms, so 50 Field Squadron (which had been detailed for the task in May) began extending it to 6,100 feet (1,900 m). Some 9,000 long tons (9,100 t) of airfield construction stores, plant and equipment were landed for this purpose. 25,000 long tons (25,000 t) of quartz granite rock fill was used, which was obtained by 3 and 60 Field Squadrons from a local quarry. Aluminium matting was laid along the whole length of the runway. The first Hercules landed on the new runway on 28 August. Subsequently, RAF Mount Pleasant was built as a permanent airbase, and opened by Prince Andrew on 12 May 1985.

Sites for the breakdown and storage of bulk supplies were limited, and the warehouses were initially used for the Argentine prisoners. While Port Stanley provided anchorages for deep draft vessels, its berths were only 6 to 10 metres (20 to 33 ft) deep, suitable only for shallow draft vessels. The Royal Engineers built two slipways for mexeflotes and LCUs. As late as April 1983, the Ministry of Defence had 25 ships on charter to supply the Falkland Islands. About 1,000 personnel were being ferried to and from the islands each month, requiring the services of Uganda and Cunard Countess. To provide a regular service, a ferry, the MV St Edmund was taken up and commissioned as a troopship, HMS Keren, although it was decommissioned becoming MV Keren a few weeks later. The port was replaced by a £23 million floating wharf and warehouse complex that opened on 26 April 1984. This consisted of six 800-foot (240 m) North Sea oil rig support barges that were linked together. Atop them were warehouses, refrigerated storages, and accommodation and mess facilities for 200 people. It could berth vessels up to 1,000 feet (300 m) long, and was connected to the shore by a 623-foot (190 m) two-lane causeway. An access road was constructed by 37 Engineer Regiment.

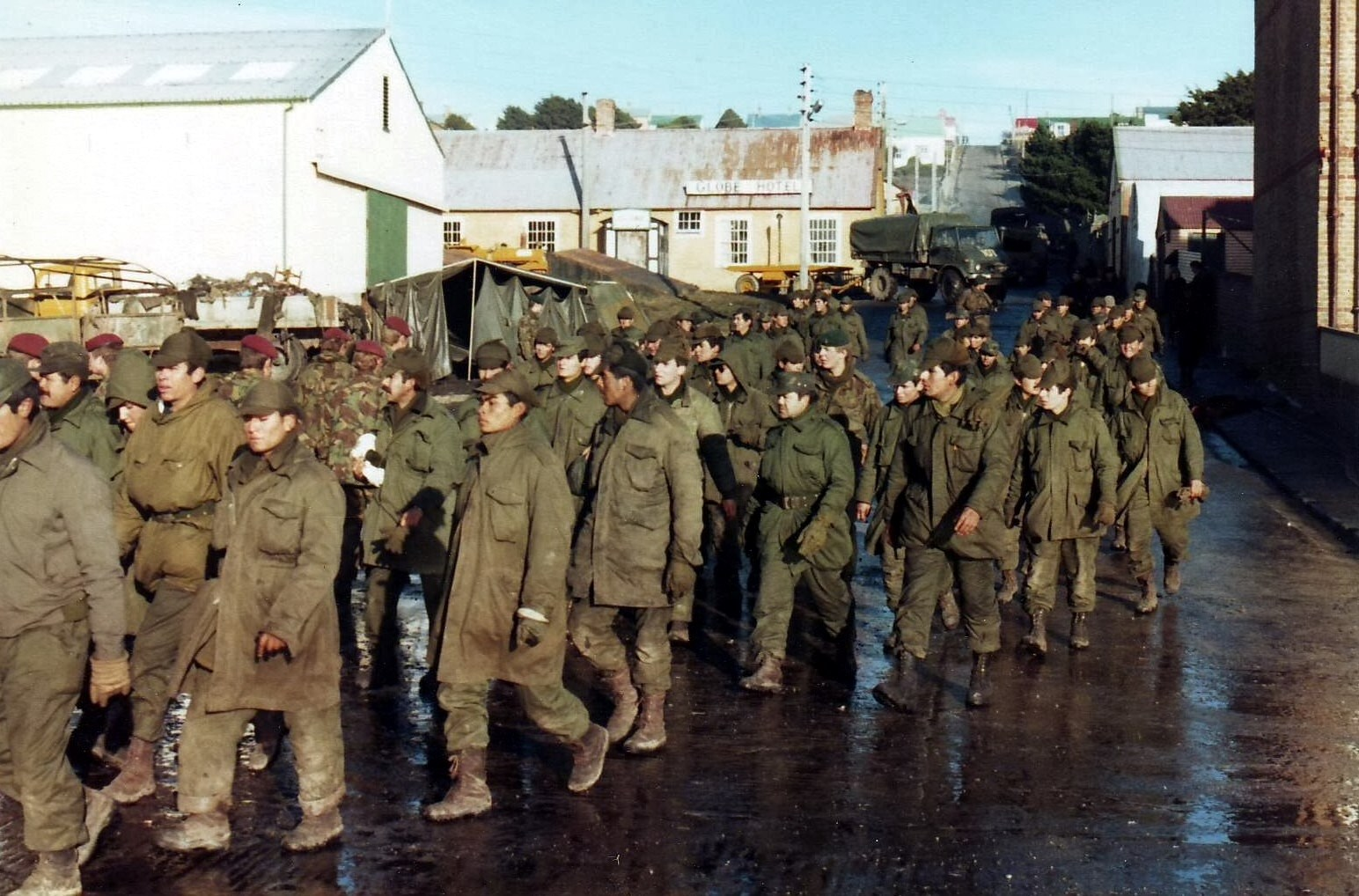
Argentine prisoners of war in Port Stanley

With the end of hostilities in the Falklands (although Operation Keyhole, the reoccupation of Thule Island in the South Sandwich Islands, remained, and was concluded on 20 June), the British forces became responsible for feeding the civilian population and 11,848 Argentine prisoners. Due to the British blockade of the island, they had only three days' rations. The prisoners were initially issued with Argentine rations, but the British withheld the officer rations as they contained alcohol. Prisoners rioted on 16 June, setting fire to their clothing store. Those taken at Goose Green had already been repatriated to Argentina via Montevideo in neutral Uruguay on Norland. Some 5,000 Argentine prisoners were embarked on Canberra and 1,000 on Norland on 17 June. By 20 June 10,250 prisoners had been repatriated. Only 593 remained, including Menéndez. These were held for intelligence gathering, and to encourage Argentina to end hostilities. One British prisoner, Flight Lieutenant Jeffrey Glover, was held in Argentina; he was released on 16 July. The last Argentine prisoners were repatriated by 14 July.

The Bakery Section of 91 Ordnance Company baked its first loaf in the Falkland Islands on 30 June. It baked up to 6,000 loaves per day before settling down to just 4,000 by August. Although rations could soon be supplemented with fresh fruit and vegetables, it was not until August that the troops could be fed fresh rations.

A wing of the small King Edward VII Memorial Hospital at Port Stanley was occupied by 16 Field Ambulance. Its first task was sorting through captured Argentine medical supplies. The military hospital wing opened on 29 June. Uganda dropped anchor at Port William to supply backup care, and donated fifty hospital beds and bedding to King Edward VII Memorial Hospital. Having sailed from the UK on the TEV Rangatira on 19 June, 2 Field Hospital reached the Falkland Islands on 11 July. Its staff included fourteen officers and other ranks of Queen Alexandra's Royal Army Nursing Corps. Its tent accommodation had been lost on Atlantic Conveyor, so it moved into the King Edward VII Memorial Hospital.

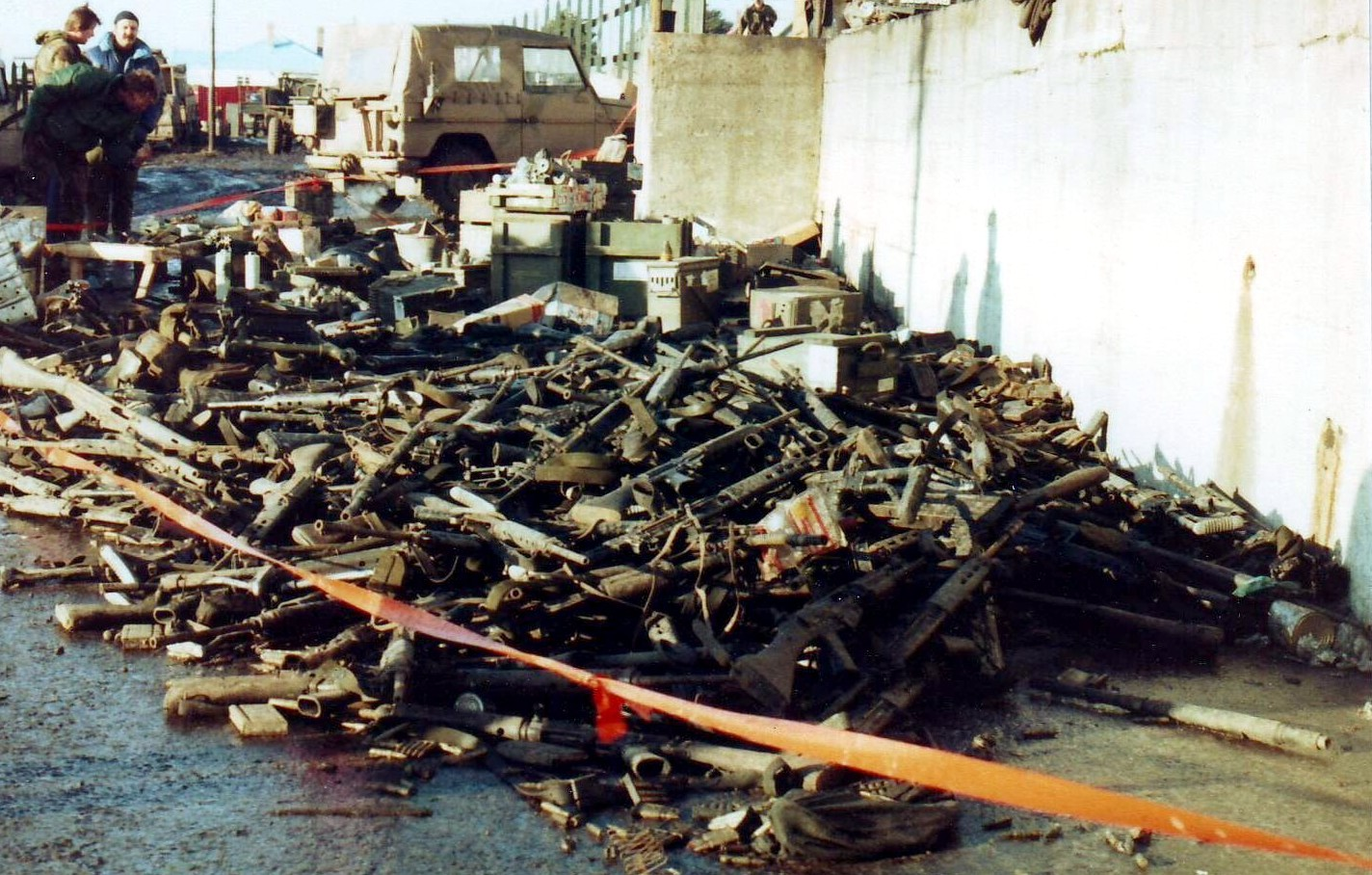
Discarded Argentine weapons in Port Stanley 1982

About 3,000 long tons (3,000 t) of British ammunition was recovered from 47 battlefield sites by 81 Ordnance Company, along with over 4.5 million rounds of Argentine ammunition. Some 1,000 long tons (1,000 t) was found to be serviceable, and was shipped to the UK. Most Argentine equipment was dumped at sea, but some items, including Chinook and Agusta 109 helicopters, were taken back to the UK.

The first units to return from the Falkland Islands were 2 and 3 Para, which left on Norland and Europic Ferry in June. The 3rd Commando Brigade followed, departing on Canberra on 26 June, with the Commando Logistic Regiment embarking on Sir Percivale two days later. This left the 5th Infantry Brigade, whose logistic support was consolidated into the Falkland Islands Logistic Battalion on 28 June. Major General David Thorne became Commander, British Forces Falkland Islands in July. He brought the 1st Battalion Queen's Own Highlanders (Seaforth and Camerons) and a company of the Queen's Lancashire Regiment with him, enabling the relief of the 5th Infantry Brigade's combat units to commence. The last of these, the 2nd Battalion, Scots Guards, departed the Falkland Islands in July.

Thorne gave a high priority to providing proper accommodation for his men before the next winter. Portable buildings were erected with running water, electric power and sewerage. Additional accommodation was provided by the "coastels", floating multi-storeyed accommodation vessels for 900 people with their own kitchens, fresh water, laundry and recreational facilities. Safe Dominia and Safe Esperia were chartered from the Swedish Consafe. The latter's facilities included a gymnasium, four squash courts, two swimming pools and a canteen, which was operated by NAAFI. They were joined by the British-built Pursuivant, which left for the Falkland Islands in July 1983. Thorne was succeeded by Major General Peter de la Billière in 1984.

A Grave Registration unit of the Royal Pioneer Corps arrived on the SS Strathewe, along with coffins and embalming materials. It had the task of disinterring the bodies of those killed. For the first time in British history, families were given the option of having their loved ones' remains returned to the UK, and 64 chose to exercise this option. The remaining 14 bodies (including that of Lieutenant Colonel H. Jones, who was posthumously awarded the Victoria Cross (VC) for his part in the Battle of Goose Green) were re-interred in the Blue Beach Military Cemetery at San Carlos. An Argentine Military Cemetery was established near Goose Green in 1983, which was rebuilt between 2002 and 2004. The Argentine government did not wish to "repatriate" its dead, as it considered that they were already in Argentina. Many were not identified, and were buried with the inscription "Argentine soldier known unto God."

== Lessons ==
In the logistics section of its report to Parliament on the lessons of the war, the Ministry of Defence highlighted the prodigious expenditure of ammunition and missiles; the high level of logistic support required for operations outside western Europe; the importance of civil resources in the defence effort; and the utility of aerial refuelling. The value of the Royal Navy's amphibious forces was reassessed. A replacement for the lost Sir Galahad was ordered, and two roll-on roll-off ferries, RFA Sir Caradoc and Sir Lamorak, were chartered while the new RFA Sir Galahad was built and Sir Tristram was repaired. However, the government still dithered over the replacement of the Fearless-class LPDs; and replacements, the Albion class, were not ordered until 1996. The oil rig support ship MV Stena Inspector was purchased in 1983, and became RFA Diligence, while Astronomer and Contender Bezant were retained as RFA Reliant and Argus respectively. The value of STUFT was recognised, and over the next few years STUFT would see active service in the Mediterranean, the Red Sea and the Persian Gulf.

The Falkland War was also studied in other countries, notably in China, where it was the subject of organised teaching and research at the PLA Naval Command College in Nanjing. The Americans were impressed by the speed with which the British were able to mobilise their forces and get them moving to the theatre of operations in response to a crisis that had erupted with very little warning. A programme was already under way to improve American sealift capability, and between 1982 and 1986, the United States Congress appropriated and spent US$7 billion on the purchase or lease of new logistics ships. They would be tested in the 1991 Gulf War. Thompson felt that the overriding importance of logistics as the driving factor of operations was overlooked. He was particularly disappointed that the 5th Infantry Brigade had not used the time it had before embarkation to remedy more of its logistical shortcomings.

Logistics lessons drawn from the conflict were not new, but had not been learned either. These included the failure to integrate operational and tactical planning; improper tactical loading of ships; outdated planning data for consumables, particularly fuel and ammunition; lack of heavy-lift helicopters and poor discipline in the employment of helicopters; shortages of land transport; the employment of new and highly complex equipment on the battlefield; faulty casualty evacuation plans; and the need for post-conflict planning. British and American commentators observed that much of this could be traced to logistically unrealistic peacetime training and exercises, and called for more exercises where there were "no permanent quarters to house the troops, no Federal Express to deliver critical supply parts, no power production and no in-place hookups for communications or intelligence information."
