= RFA Diligence =

1984 Forward repair ship of the Royal Fleet Auxiliary

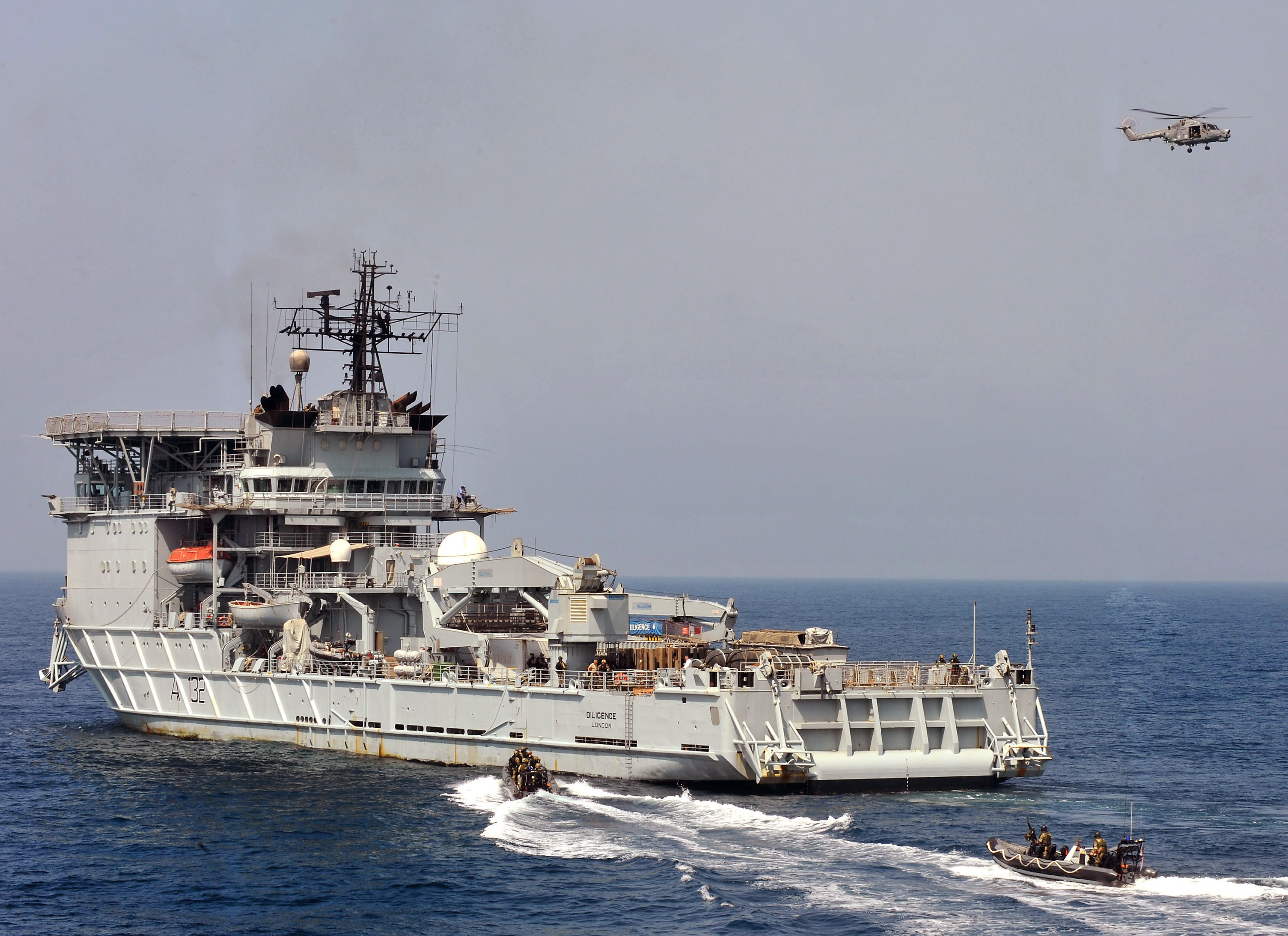
- RFA Diligence acting as a target ship during a boarding exercise in 2011

History

United Kingdom
- Name: RFA Diligence
- Builder: Öresundsvarvet AB, Landskrona, Sweden
- Launched: January 1981
- Acquired: October 1983
- Commissioned: 12 March 1984
- Decommissioned: June 2016
- Identification: IMO number: 7814448; MMSI number: 234084000; Callsign: GCPC; Pennant number: A132
- Nickname(s): Floating Swiss Army Knife
- Fate: Sold for scrap

General characteristics
- Displacement: 10,595 tonnes (10,428 long tons)
- Length: 112 m (367 ft 5 in)
- Beam: 20.5 m (67 ft 3 in)
- Draught: 6.8 m (22 ft 4 in)
- Propulsion: Diesel-electric drive; 5 × NOHAB-Polar diesel generators; 4 × NEBB motors; 1 × propeller; 2 × 360-degree azimuth thrusters; 2 × Kamewa bow thrusters
- Speed: 10 knots (19 km/h; 12 mph)
- Troops: up to 55 personnel
- Complement: 54 RFA and up to 147 RN
- Sensors & processing systems: Kelvin Hughes Ltd SharpEye navigation radar
- Armament: 2 × Oerlikon 20 mm cannon; 4 × 7.62 mm machine guns; 4 × Mk44 miniguns
- Aviation facilities: Helicopter deck up to CH-47 Chinook size

RFA Diligence was a forward repair ship of the Royal Fleet Auxiliary. Launched in 1981 as a support ship for North Sea oil rigs, she was chartered by the British government to support naval activities during the 1982 Falklands War and was later bought outright as a fleet maintenance vessel. She gave assistance to the damaged USS Tripoli and Princeton in the 1991 Gulf War, and to Sri Lanka after the 2005 tsunami. She typically had deployments of 5-8 years in support of the Trafalgar-class submarine on duty east of Suez, with a secondary role as a mothership for British and US minesweepers in the Persian Gulf. Until 2016 Diligence was set to go out of service in 2020. However in August 2016, the UK Ministry of Defence placed an advert for the sale of RFA Diligence. As of 2016 the option for the delivery of future operational maintenance and repair capability for the RFA remained under consideration. However, the 2021 British defence white paper made no specific mention of the need for this capability. In April 2024, she arrived in Turkey for recycling.

== Facilities ==
Diligence was designed to provide forward repair and maintenance facilities to ships and submarines operating away from their home ports, so in addition to a variety of workshops she could also provide overside electrical supplies, fuel, water and sullage reception. Diligence provided a large workshop facility for Royal Navy vessels, she was equipped with specialist machinery such as arc welding equipment, lathes, pillar drills, grinders, band saws and a large store of spares.

Diligence was the Royal Navy's primary battle damage repair unit, and was on short notice to react to developing situations worldwide. One of the key features of the ship's design was the dynamic positioning system which could keep the vessel static in poor conditions, using the ship's range of thrusters and the variable-pitch propeller.

The ship had a helicopter deck on the roof of her bridge that was large enough to support a CH-47 Chinook. The hull was built to the highest ice class specification, which allowed her to navigate polar regions without the assistance of an icebreaker.

== Launch and the Falklands War ==
Diligence was built by Öresundsvarvet in Landskrona, Sweden and launched in 1981 as a civilian oil rig support ship. She first served the Royal Fleet Auxiliary (RFA) immediately after the Falklands War as a civilian owned ship taken up from the trade (STUFT). As MV Stena Inspector, the ship repaired many British vessels. Stena Inspector was purchased by the Government in 1983 for £25 million from Stena Offshore UK and renamed Diligence. She was sailed to the Clyde Dock Engineering facility, where she was converted and military features added, including a large workshop for hull and machinery repairs, supply facilities, accommodation, armaments and magazines and communications fits.

Her Sister Ship, Stena Seaspread had previously been a STUFT ship during the Falklands War.

== Later history ==
Diligence provided damage repair work many times during her lifetime. At the end of the Iran–Iraq War, the Straits of Hormuz were mined, and Diligence supported the multinational minesweeping operation to clear that vital chokepoint. Diligence also helped to repair HMS Southampton after collision damage. The ship returned to the Persian Gulf in 1990 to support operations during the Gulf War by repairing, among others, two American ships damaged by mines.

In 1995, according to British reports, Diligence was confronted and illuminated by the radar of the Argentine corvette ARA Granville, which was harassing shipping near the Falklands.

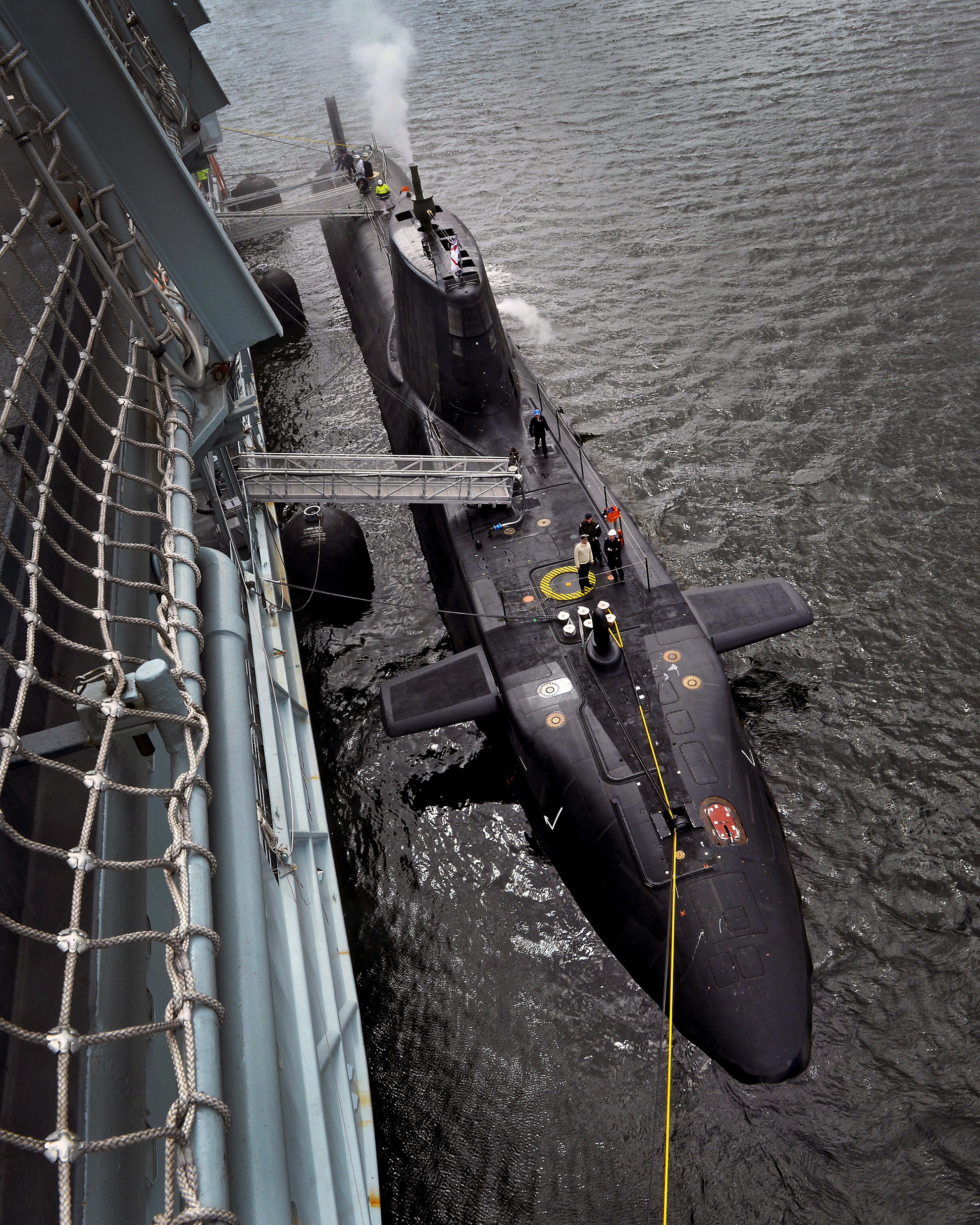
HMS Ambush sits alongside Diligence in Gare Loch, HMNB Clyde, Scotland.

During Operation Ocean Wave 97, Diligence deployed to the Far East as a submarine support ship. The following year, the ship supported 3rd Mine Counter-Measures Squadron in the Persian Gulf. Following just two weeks in the UK, Diligence departed for the south Atlantic, returning to Faslane in December 1998. Early 1999 saw the ship again deployed to the Falklands region.

2001 saw a large exercise in Oman, and Diligence supported the four MCMVs involved. The ship's next wartime assignment came with the large taskforce deployed against Iraq in 2003. Returning to familiar territory, Diligence supported the largest British fleet deployed since the Falklands War.

When the ship returned to UK in November 2006 she had the longest deployment of an RFA in recent times. From her departure from Portsmouth it was 5 and half years before she returned home to Portsmouth. In that time she has visited 25 different countries whilst steaming some 150,000 miles (241,000 km), through the Mediterranean to the Persian Gulf, across the Indian Ocean to India, Sri Lanka and Singapore, the South China Sea to the Philippines and from South Africa across the Atlantic to the Falklands and South America. Many of these Oceans and countries visited 2 or 3 times.

All this work took its toll on the 25-year-old ship, and the ship was given a £16 million overhaul during 2007 at Northwestern Shiprepairers and Shipbuilders in Birkenhead. Her accommodation areas, galley and engine room were all upgraded, with the intention of extending the ship's service life until the middle of the next decade. The overhaul was completed in December 2007.

A £17.6m refit was carried out from June 2012 to February 2013 ahead of a deployment to the Mediterranean and Gulf region in support of the COUGAR 13 task group. An £11m refit followed from September 2014 to February 2015, after which she was laid up at the Cammell Laird shipyard in Birkenhead.

=== Disposal ===
In June 2016 the Royal Navy decided to retire the ship immediately instead of in 2020 as had previously been planned as a cost-saving measure. A Royal Navy spokesman told IHS Jane's that Diligence was considered to be "an aged singleton ship with increasing obsolescence issues", and that it was no longer cost-effective to maintain her in service. As of 2016, no replacement for the ship had been identified and the 2021 British defence white paper made no mention of the need for any such capability.

In March 2017, Diligence was towed from Birkenhead to Portsmouth where she awaited a potential buyer. In April 2023, it was revealed that the ship was to be scrapped after no suitable buyers materialised, and in March 2024 she departed the UK for the final time, under tow to a scrapyard in Turkey.
