= MS Europic Ferry =

Car ferry built in 1967

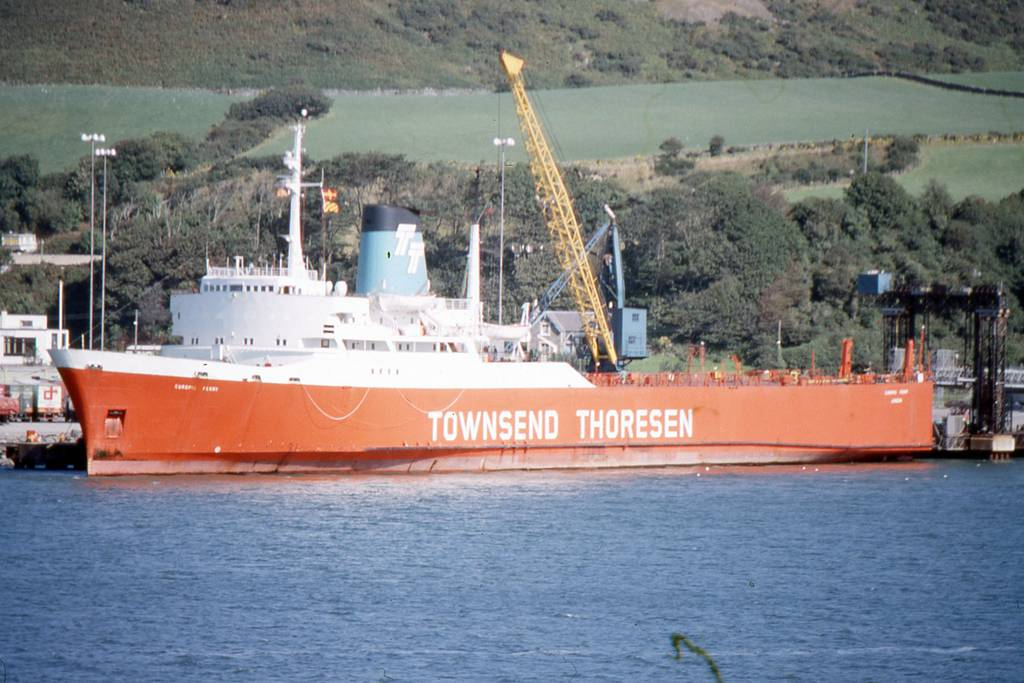
- Europic Ferry at Cairnryan, Scotland in 1987

History
- Name: Ajman Glory (2004–2005); Afrodite II (1993–2004); European Freighter (1991–1993); Europic Ferry (1967–1991)
- Owner: Namora Shipping (1993–2004); Howill Shipping (1991–1993); P&O (1987–1991); European Ferries (1971–1987); Atlantic Steam Navigation Company (1967–1971)
- Operator: Med Link Lines (1993–2004); P&O European Ferries (1987–1993); Townsend Thoresen (1982–1987); Ministry of Defence (1982); Townsend Thoresen (1971–1982); Transport Ferry Service (1967–1971)
- Builder: Swan Hunter (Shipbuilders) Ltd, Wallsend
- Yard number: 2025
- Launched: 3 October 1967
- In service: January 1968
- Out of service: Sold for scrap 2004
- Identification: IMO number: 6728563
- Fate: Scrapped 2005

General characteristics
- Tonnage: 4,190 GT; 2,740 DWT
- Length: 450 feet (140 m)
- Beam: 66 feet 6 inches (20.27 m)
- Draught: 15 feet (4.6 m)
- Propulsion: Two SEMT Pielstick 4-stroke single-acting diesel engines
- Speed: 19.25 knots
- Capacity: 44 passengers (as built)
- Crew: 52 (in ASN service)

MS Europic Ferry was a roll-on/roll-off car ferry built in 1967 by Swan Hunter for the Atlantic Steam Navigation Company (ASN). She was acquired by European Ferries in 1971 when they took over the ASN and served with them under the Townsend Thoresen branding. The Europic Ferry was requisitioned by the British government in April 1982 and transported stores, equipment and troops to the South Atlantic during the Falklands War. After the war she returned to service with European Ferries until that company was sold to P&O in 1987. She was sold again to Namora Shipping in 1993 and served on routes in the Mediterranean until sold for scrapping in 2004.

== Ferry service ==
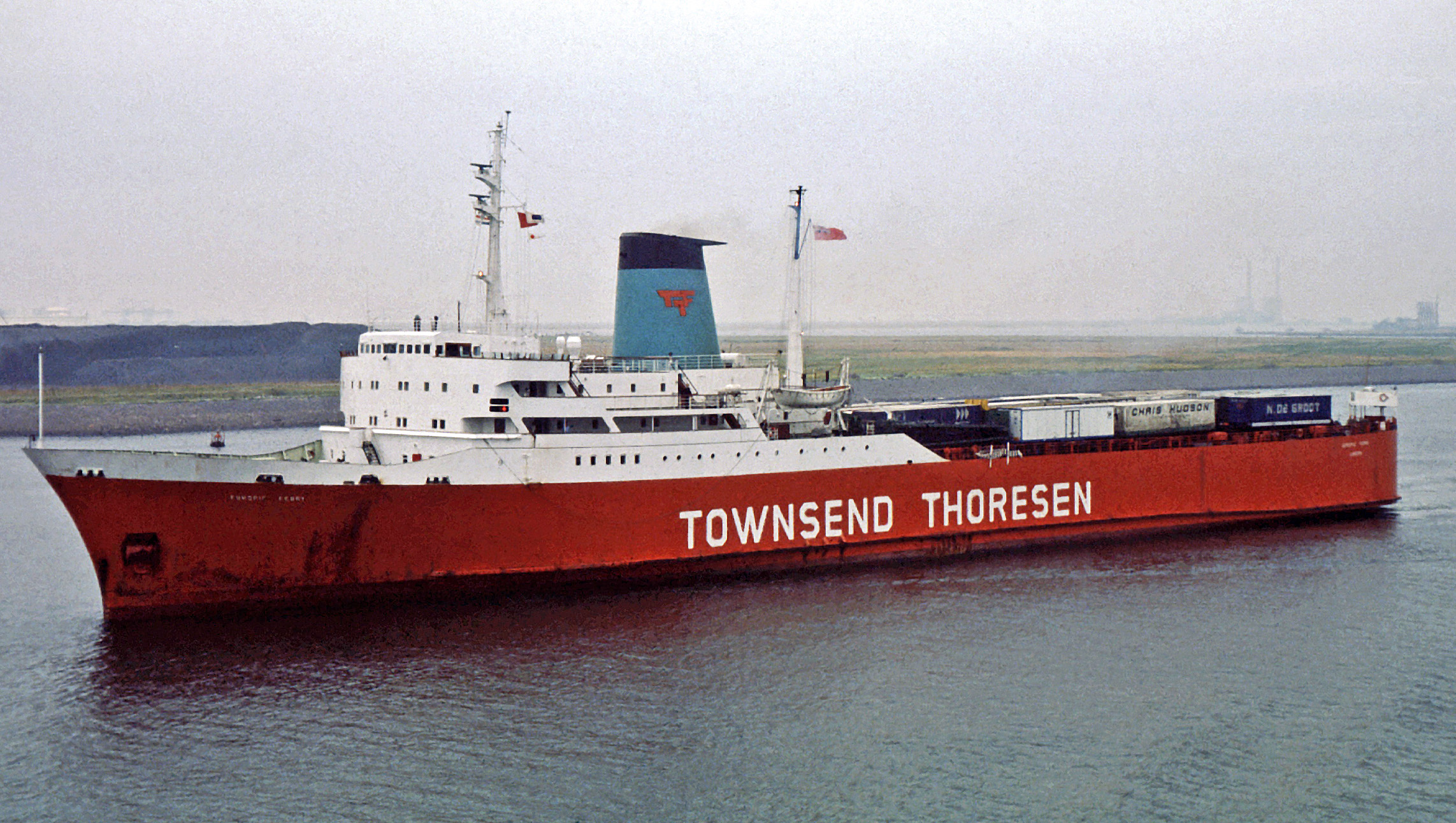
Europic Ferry at Rotterdam in 1979

The Europic Ferry was built as hull number 2025 at the Neptune Yard of Swan Hunter at Walker on the River Tyne and was launched on 3 October 1967. A roll-on/roll-off car ferry, as-built she had a gross tonnage of 4,190 and a deadweight tonnage of 2,740. She measured 450 feet (140 m) in length, 66 feet 6 inches (20.27 m) in beam and had a draught of 15 feet (4.6 m). She was fitted with two SEMT Pielstick 4-stroke single-acting diesel engines that were installed by Lindholmens and had a maximum speed of 19.25 knots. She also had stabilisers and a bow thruster.

Europic Ferry had two main decks that spanned the entire vessel (a vehicle deck and an upper deck), a lower vehicle deck was located behind the engine room and was accessed via a hydraulic ramp from the vehicle deck. The main vehicle deck was accessed by a hydraulic stern ramp and could carry almost 100 road vehicles. Europic Ferry also had cargo space to carry unit loads. Load-carrying space was maximised by placing the machinery and accommodation towards the bow. Europic Ferry was built with a mixture of two- and four-berth cabins for passengers and vehicle drivers, giving a total capacity of 44.

Europic Ferry was delivered to the Atlantic Steam Navigation Company (ASN) on 29 December. She commenced operations with ASN's Transport Ferry Service on 17 January 1968, after a brief voyage to Tilbury. She made her maiden voyage from Felixstowe on 17 January 1968 and by the middle of that year was running a regular service between that port and Europoort in Rotterdam, Netherlands. She cut the journey time on this route to six hours which made it the fastest North Sea ferry crossing of the time. The Europic Ferry carried road vehicles, freight (containerised and flat) and passengers and was equipped to serve meals and provide sleeping accommodation. ASN operated her with 52 crew.

In 1971 the ASN was purchased by European Ferries, and Europic Ferry afterwards sailed under the Townsend Thoresen branding.

== Falklands War ==
=== Requisition and preparation ===
After the 2 April 1982 Argentine invasion of the Falkland Islands the British government assembled a taskforce to retake the territory. This included many merchant ships taken up from trade (STUFT) as well as Royal Navy, Royal Fleet Auxiliary (RFA) and Royal Maritime Auxiliary Service vessels. Europic Ferry was one of the first vessels to be identified by the Ministry of Defence as required for the campaign; it was earmarked for use as a stores transport ship in early April. She was officially requisitioned on 19 April and spent the next three days at Vosper & Company, Southampton, being modified for military service. She was fitted with replenishment-at-sea equipment, freshwater generators, satellite navigation and satellite communications systems. Additional crew and troop accommodation was also installed. The vessel was also fitted with pintle-mounted Bren light machine guns as a rudimentary defence against low-level air attack.

The Europic Ferry loaded at the port of Southampton and departed for the South Atlantic on 25 April, calling briefly at Portland Harbour. She was loaded with ammunition, stores, fuel and vehicles including much of the support equipment for the 2nd Battalion, Parachute Regiment. She also carried equipment for No. 656 Squadron AAC, including four Westland Scout helicopters lashed to her deck, and for 29th Commando Regiment Royal Artillery, including six L118 light guns which were secured on deck next to her superstructure. A number of personnel were also carried including the ground crews for the Westland Wessex and Boeing CH-47 Chinook helicopters carried aboard the Atlantic Conveyor.

Europic Ferry called at Freetown, Sierra Leone, for fuel before arriving at Ascension Island in company with the troop ship Norland (another requisitioned ferry) on 8 May. The two vessels spent the day there crossloading stores before sailing to meet up with Atlantic Conveyor, Canberra, Elk and a number of navy and RFA vessels that would form part of the first amphibious landing force, some 1,000 miles (1,600 km) north-west of Tristan de Cunha. The force sailed southwards together and, after being overflown by Russian aircraft and reportedly spotting a submarine periscope, enacted wartime measures including keeping watertight doors closed and sailing in zig-zag courses.

=== In the South Atlantic ===
After assembling to the east of the Falkland Islands, the force sailed on 20 May as part of the first large-scale British landings, Operation Sutton. Europic Ferry formed part of the third wave of the landings which took place in San Carlos Water. Entering the bay in the early morning of 21 May, she spent much of the day anchored offshore, offloading stores by helicopter and into landing craft from her stern door. The six 105mm guns and ammunition were the first items offloaded. The Argentinian air force carried air attacks that afternoon, as part of the Battle of San Carlos. Clear skies left the ships anchored in the bay vulnerable and Europic Ferry suffered a near miss. Commodore Michael Clapp, the Commodore, Amphibious Warfare, ordered all merchant ships to leave the bay by midnight as he judged it too dangerous to continue offloading. Europic Ferry left the bay around 11 pm and rejoined the main taskforce.

Europic Ferry returned to San Carlos on 26 May to discharge her remaining stores and personnel. At around this time a hand-applied mottled grey camouflage scheme was painted over the vessel's peacetime orange livery. The Europic Ferry was the only merchant ship to be camouflaged during the war, though some had their funnel markings painted out. In mid-June the ship was back outside the Total Exclusion Zone, acting as a floating platform for works to Chinook helicopters which had been transported to the South Atlantic on the Contender Bezant. Personnel of No. 18 Squadron RAF worked on the deck of Europic Ferry to make the helicopters airworthy before they were flown to the aircraft carrier HMS Hermes. On 15 June the ship was at risk of capsize in a heavy swell, due to the presence of a Chinook lashed to her deck. The Europic Ferry's officers considered jettisoning the helicopter but the swell passed and the Chinook, undamaged by the ordeal, was successfully flown off on 16 June. Europic Ferry afterwards sailed to Port Stanley, which had surrendered to British forces on 14 June to load stores and equipment. She sailed for the United Kingdom on 23 June and arrived back to Southampton on Saturday 17 July carrying returning troops of 2nd and 3rd Battalions, Parachute Regiment.

== Later career ==
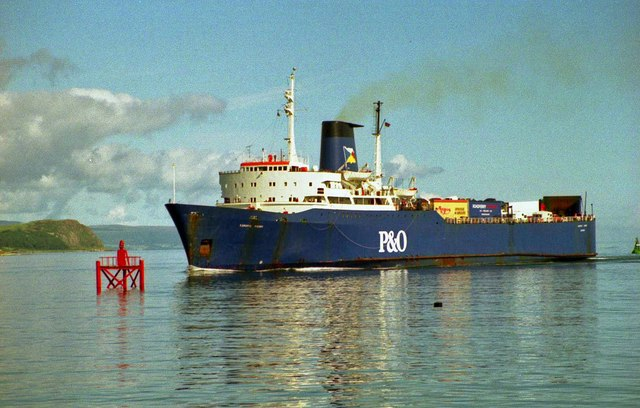
The Europic Ferry at Larne, Northern Ireland, in 1990

Europic Ferry was returned to European Ferries later in 1982. She continued to serve on the Felixstowe – Rotterdam route before switching to Townsend Thoresen's Western English Channel service. The vessel came into the ownership of P&O in 1987 after they completed a takeover of European Ferries and was soon sailing under their P&O European Ferries branding. Europic Ferry spent some time on the Preston, Lancashire – Larne, Northern Ireland, route. In 1991 she was sold by P&O to Howill Shipping and leased back on a hire purchase arrangement. Around the same time she was renamed European Freighter.

European Freighter was sold to the Cyprus-based Namora Shipping in 1993 and renamed Afrodite II. She sailed under their Med Link Lines branding and was to have been employed on the Chios – Mytilene freight route in Greece from 2003. She was sold for scrap in 2004 and, afterwards being renamed Ajman Glory, was broken-up at Alang, India, in 2005.
