= STUFT =

Requisitioned ships in the UK

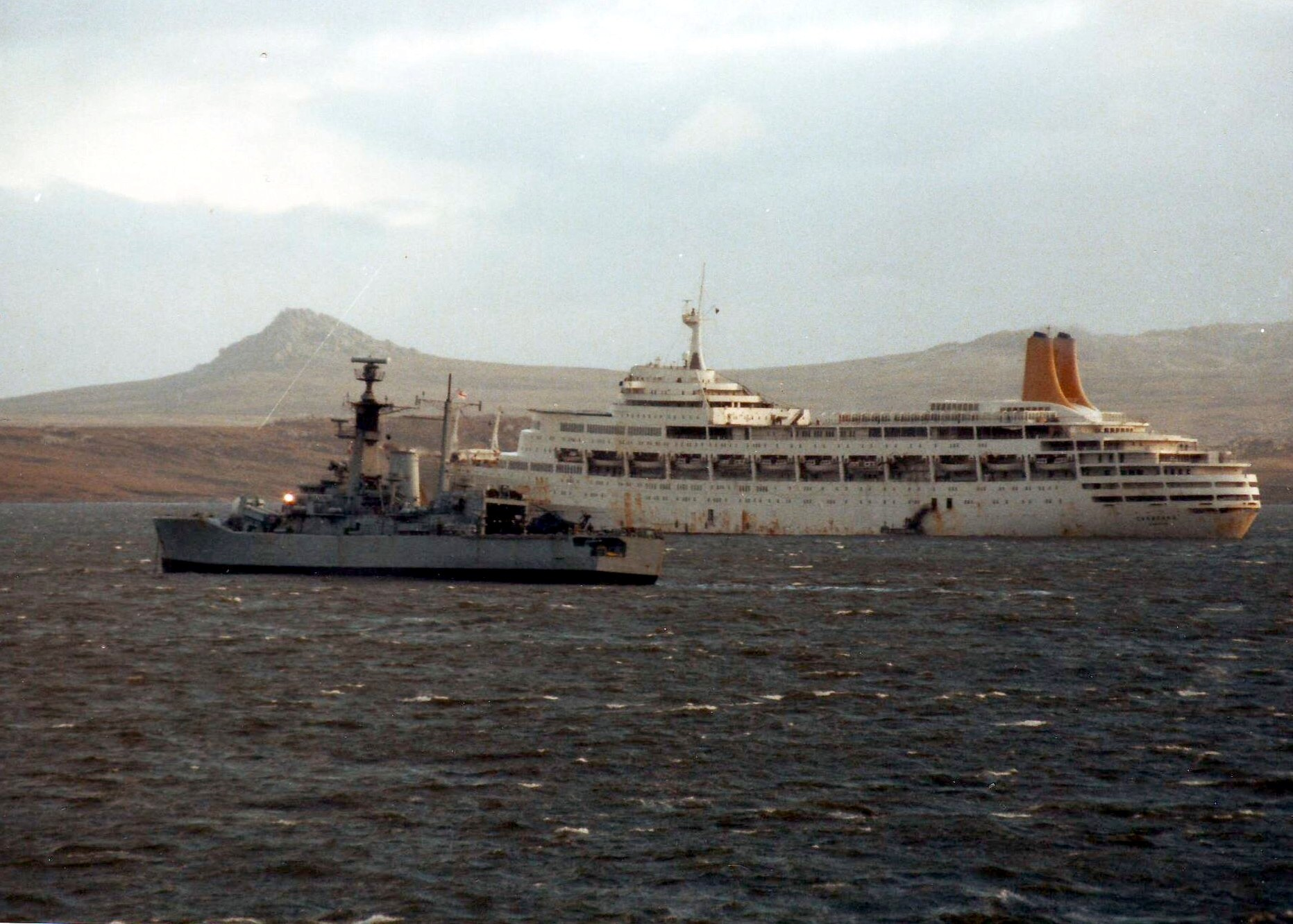
SS Canberra in the Falklands after being requisitioned as a troop ship

A STUFT (acronym for ship taken up from trade) is a UK civilian ship requisitioned for government use.

The Falklands War of 1982 saw a diversity of ships taken up from trade, including tankers with potable water (see British logistics in the Falklands War) and fuels, freighters carrying food and munitions, and luxury liners converted to carry troops.
