= List of leaders of the Falklands War =

This is a list of all major leaders – both civilian and military – of both the United Kingdom and Argentine Republic during the Falklands War of 1982.

== United Kingdom forces ==
=== Political ===
- Elizabeth II, Queen of the United Kingdom from 1952 to 2022
- John Nott, Secretary of State for Defence from 1981 to 1983
- Margaret Thatcher, Prime Minister of the United Kingdom from 1979 to 1990
- Rex Hunt, Governors of the Falkland Islands from 1980 to 1985

=== Military ===
- Terence Lewin, Chief of the Defence Staff from 1979 to 1982
- David Evans, Vice-Chief of the Defence Staff from 1981 to 1983
- Henry Leach, First Sea Lord and Chief of the Naval Staff from 1979 to 1982
- John Fieldhouse, Commander-in-Chief Fleet from 1981 to 1982
- Sandy Woodward, Flag Officer First Flotilla from to 1981 to 1983
- Steuart Pringle, Commandant General Royal Marines from 1981 to 1984
- Michael Beetham, Chief of the Air Staff
- Jeremy Moore, Major-general of Royal Marines
- Michael Clapp, commanded amphibious assault group Task Group 317.0
- Julian Thompson, commanded 3 Commando Brigade from 1981 to 1983
- Nick Vaux, commanded 42 Commando from 1981 to 1983
- Tony Wilson, commanded 5th Infantry Brigade
- Jonathan Thomson, commanded Special Boat Service
- Michael Rose, commanded 22 SAS

== Argentina ==
=== Political ===
- Leopoldo Galtieri, President of Argentina from 1981 to 1982
- Oswaldo Jorge García, Military Governor of the Malvinas, South Georgia and South Sandwich Islands (interim)
- Mario Benjamín Menéndez, Military Governor of the Malvinas, South Georgia and South Sandwich Islands
- Julio Martínez Vivot, Ministry of Defense from 1982 to 1983

=== Military ===
- Leopoldo Galtieri, Chief of the General Staff of the Argentine Army from 1981 to 1982
- Leopoldo Suárez del Cerro, Chief of the Joint Chiefs of Staff
- Jorge Anaya, Commander-in-Chief of the Navy
- Basilio Lami Dozo, Commander-in-Chief of the Air Force
- Juan Lombardo, Commander-in-Chief of the South Atlantic Theatre of Operations
- Ernesto Horacio Crespo, commanded South Air Force
