= Battle of San Carlos (1982) =

Aerial and naval battle during the Falklands War

Coordinates: 51°30′28″S 59°4′47″W

- Part of the Falklands War
Date	21–25 May 1982
Location	San Carlos Water, Falkland Islands
Result	British victory: British beachhead successfully established

Belligerents
United Kingdom	Argentina

Commanders and leaders
(United Kingdom) Sandy Woodward (United Kingdom) Michael Clapp (United Kingdom) Julian Thompson	(Argentina) Mario Menendez (Argentina) Ernesto Crespo

Strength
2 destroyers 7 frigates 11 landing ships Sea Harrier CAPs	90 fighter-bombers on the mainland 2 KC-130 Hercules tankers 10 attack aircraft on the islands

Casualties and losses
1 destroyer sunk 2 frigates sunk 8 ships damaged 4 helicopters lost (2 Gazelle and 2 Lynx); 49 killed and ~80 injured	22 aircraft lost 11 killed

The Battle of San Carlos was an aerial and naval battle that lasted from 21 to 25 May 1982 during the British landings on the shores of San Carlos Water (which became known as "Bomb Alley") in the Falklands War. Low-flying land-based Argentine fighter jets made repeated attacks on ships of the British Task Force.

It was the first time in history that a modern surface fleet armed with surface-to-air missiles and with air cover from carrier-based aircraft defended against full-scale air strikes. The British sustained losses and damage but were able to create and consolidate a beachhead and land troops.

== Background ==
After the Argentine invasion of the Falkland Islands the United Kingdom initiated Operation Corporate, sending a Task Force 12000 km south in order to retake the islands. Under the codename Operation Sutton the British forces planned amphibious landings around San Carlos, on an inlet located off Falkland Sound, the strait between East Falkland and West Falkland. The location was chosen as the landing force would be protected by the terrain against Exocet and submarine attacks, and it was distant enough from Stanley to prevent a rapid reaction from Argentine ground troops stationed there.

The landing took the Argentines completely by surprise; Argentine Navy officers had considered that the location was not a good choice for such an operation, and had left the zone without major defences.

=== Argentine forces ===
With Argentine army forces generally confined to a static defensive role, and the Navy's surface fleet remaining in port after the sinking of ARA General Belgrano, the task of opposing the landings fell mostly on the pilots of Argentine Air Force (FAA) and the Argentine Naval Aviation (COAN). They were operating under severe limitations due to the distance to the target area and limited refuelling resources.

The A-4 Skyhawk was the main attack aircraft of both the Air Force and the Navy, having been acquired from US Navy surplus stocks in the late 1960s and early 1970s. At the beginning of the war, the FAA had 36 A-4Bs and 16 A-4Cs listed as active, though not all were necessarily operational. In late April, Grupo 5 de Caza (English: 5th Fighter Group) deployed two temporary squadrons with 11 A-4Bs each to Rio Gallegos while Grupo 4 activated one squadron with nine A-4Cs at San Julián. Following the sinking of the Belgrano, the Navy's carrier-borne force of 8 A-4Qs was based at Río Grande naval airbase where they were joined by two refurbished aircraft of the same type. In spite of using two 295-gallons drop tanks each, the Skyhawks needed two aerial refuelings during missions. Bomb loads used during the conflict consisted of one British-made 1000 lb (Mk 17) unguided bomb or four 227 kg Mk 82 Snake Eye tail retarded bombs. The aircraft were armed with two 20 mm Colt Mk 12 cannon, although these were notoriously unreliable.

The Israeli-built copy of the Mirage 5 known as the Dagger was the Argentine Air Force's newest aircraft. Thirty-six were available to Grupo 6 in April 1982, with a serviceability rate of 60 to 70 per cent. On April 25, one squadron with 9 aircraft was deployed to San Julian, while another was activated at Río Grande with 10. They did not have aerial refuelling capacity and, using twin 550-gallon drop tanks, were flying at the limit of their range. A typical Dagger load during the conflict would include one 1000 lb Mk 17 bomb and two 1500 litre drop tanks. They retained their 30 mm DEFA cannon.

Fighter cover would be provided by Grupo 8's Mirage IIIEAs based at Rio Gallegos but the French-built interceptor had an internal fuel tank even smaller than that of the Dagger, and they could not fly low enough (which used more fuel) to escort the strike aircraft. Even by flying at high altitude, the Mirages could not fly for more than a few minutes over the islands.

The FAA units deployed to southern Argentina during the war were regrouped under a command known as Fuerza Aerea Sur (English: South Air Force), or FAS, led by Brigadier-General Ernesto Crespo. Anti-ship training was carried out against Argentine Type 42 destroyers similar to those used by the British.

On the islands themselves, the lack of long hard runways precluded the use of high-performance jets. Instead less capable aircraft were employed. The Argentine-built FMA IA-58 Pucara, which could operate from grass airstrips such as the one at Goose Green where six were based at the time of the British landings. The aircraft was ruggedly-built and armed with two 20 mm cannons, four 7.62 mm machine guns, and rocket pods, but as a propeller-driven counter-insurgency aircraft, it was not designed to take on well-defended targets. At Port Stanley Airport, the Argentine Navy's 1 Escuadrilla de Ataque (English: 1 Attack Squadron) operated five Aermacchi MB-339 trainers in the light attack role, armed with 30 mm gun pods and Zuni rockets.

Near Stanley the Argentinians deployed a long-range Westinghouse AN/TPS-43 radar that proved capable of detecting British aircraft at distances up to 40 miles.

=== British amphibious force ===
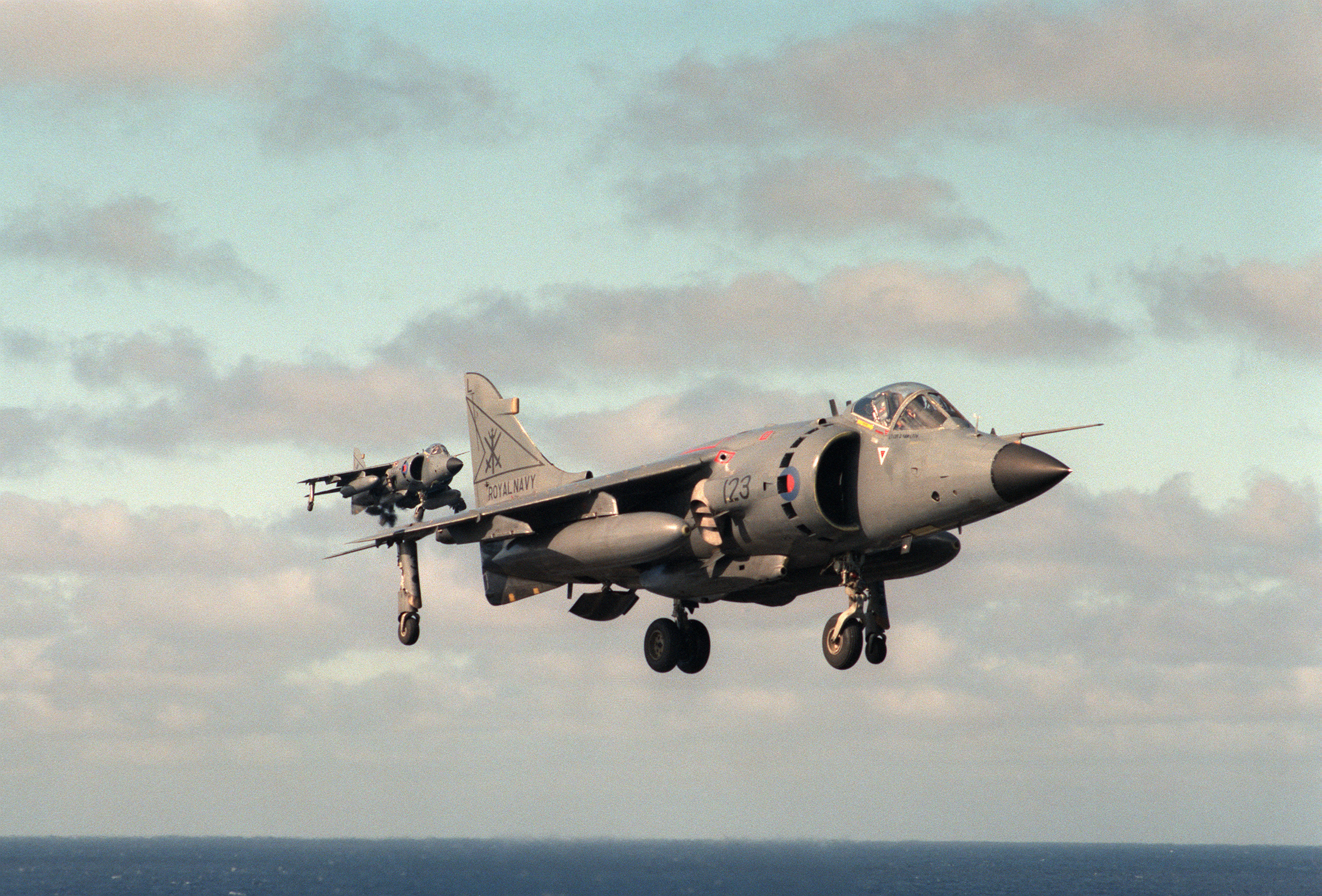
800 NAS Sea Harrier FRS1 from HMS Hermes

- British air cover was provided by aircraft carriers, deploying short-takeoff, vertical-landing Harriers.
  - Aircraft carrier HMS Hermes (R12)
    - 800 Squadron (BAE Sea Harrier)
    - 809 Squadron (BAE Sea Harrier)
  - Aircraft carrier HMS Invincible (R05)
    - 801 Squadron (BAE Sea Harrier)
    - 809 Squadron (BAE Sea Harrier)
- Landing force: HMS Fearless (L10), HMS Intrepid (L11), RFA Sir Geraint (L3027), RFA Sir Tristram (L3505), RFA Sir Galahad (1966), RFA Sir Percivale (L3036), RFA Sir Lancelot (L3029), SS Canberra, RFA Fort Austin (A386), MS Europic Ferry, MV Norland and Elk.
- Escort force: HMS Antrim (D18), HMS Coventry (D118), HMS Broadsword (F88), HMS Brilliant (F90), HMS Ardent (F184), HMS Antelope (F170), HMS Argonaut (F56), HMS Plymouth (F126) and HMS Yarmouth (F101).

== Engagements ==
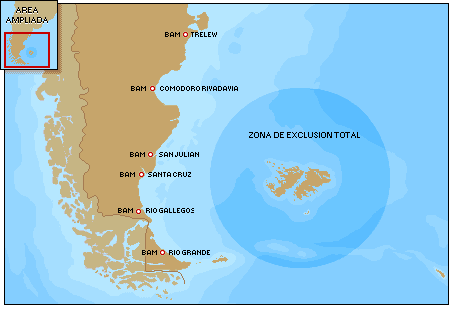
Argentine airbases: Distances to Port Stanley Airport: Trelew: 580 nautical miles (1,070 km), Comodoro Rivadavia: 480 nautical miles (890 km), San Julián: 425 nautical miles (787 km), Rio Gallegos: 435 nautical miles (806 km) and Rio Grande: 380 nautical miles (700 km). Due to the distance required to fly to the islands, two minutes was the average time Argentine attack aircraft had available in the target area.

This is a list of the main sorties carried out by Argentine air units showing approximate local time, aircraft and call sign.

=== 21 May ===
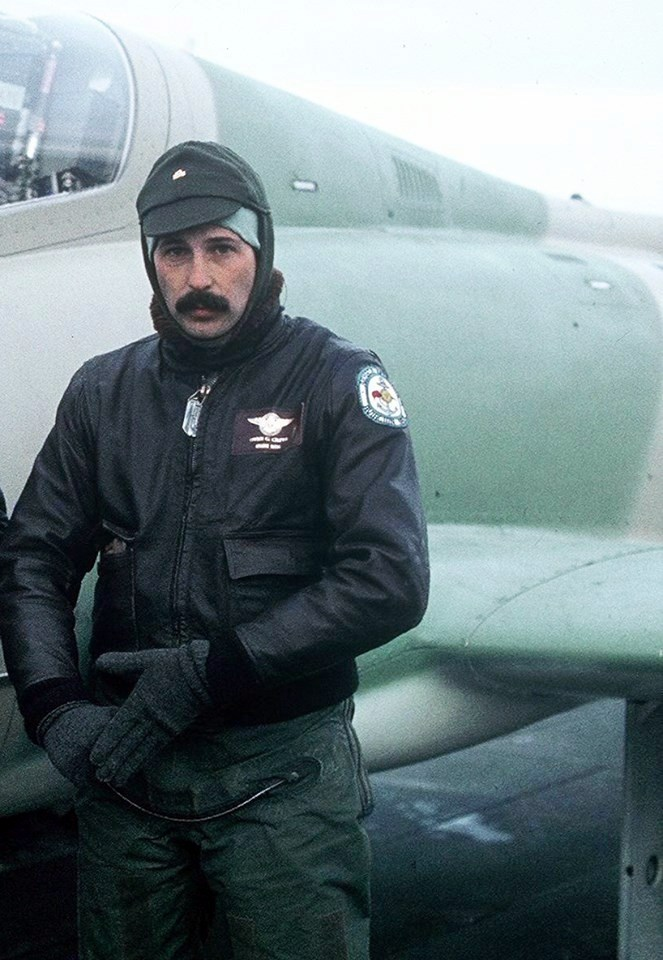
Argentine Navy Lt Owen Crippa and his Aermacchi MB-339

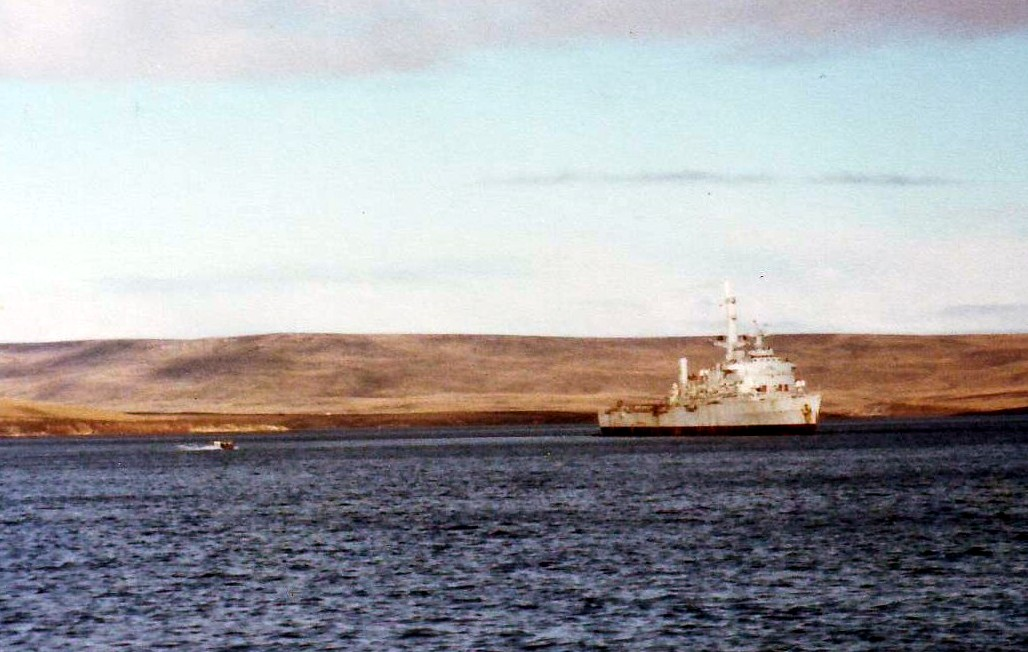
HMS Fearless at San Carlos

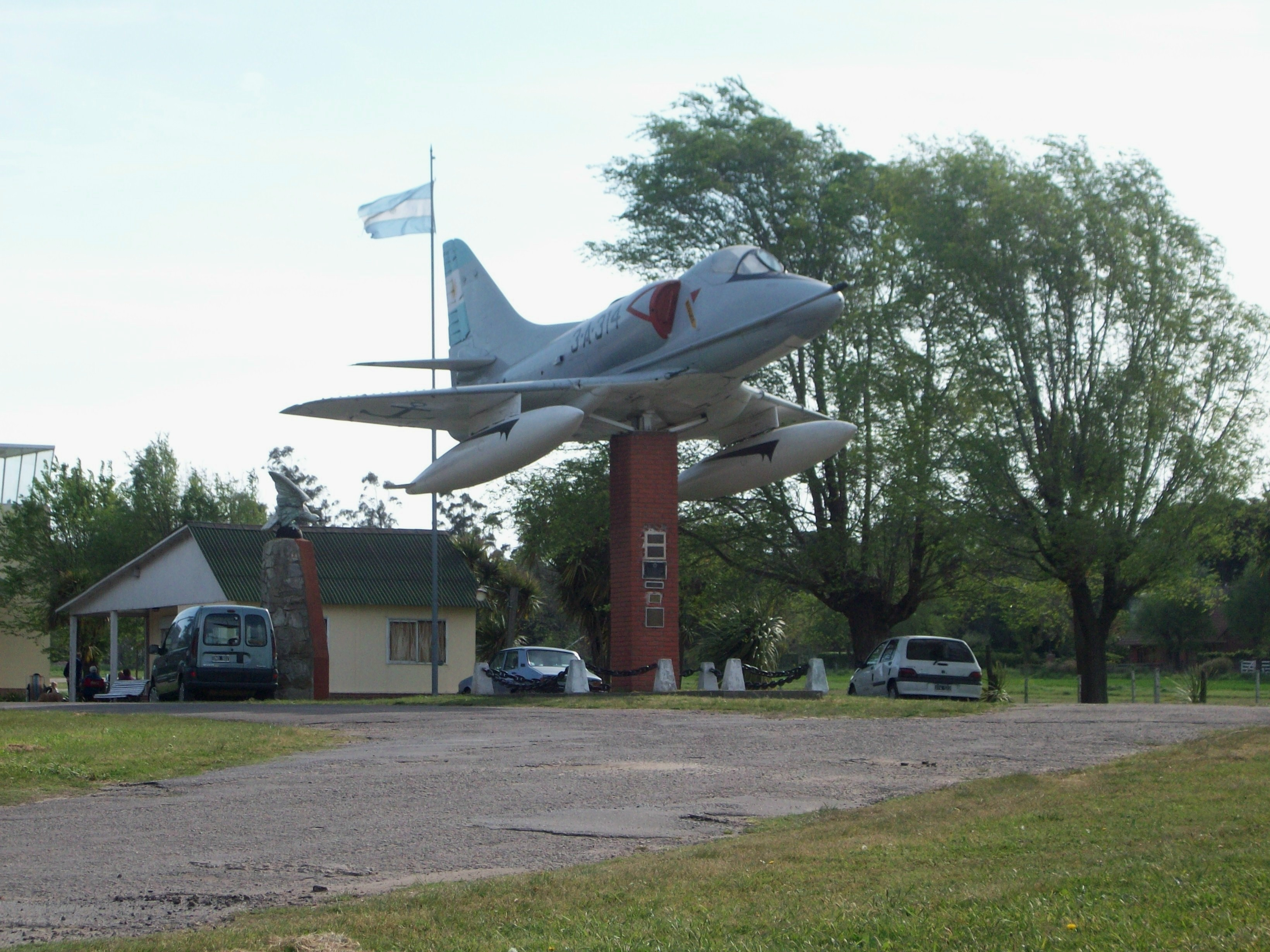
Gate guardian at the flying club Mar del Plata painted in the colours of 3-A-314, the last A-4Q to attack HMS Ardent

The Argentine Army force on site was a section from the 25th Infantry Regiment named Combat Team Güemes (Spanish: Equipo de Combate Güemes). The 62-man unit, under 1st Lieutenant Carlos Esteban, was dispatched to the area on May 15 following HMS Alacrity's passage through Falkland Sound. An outpost with two 81mm mortars and two recoilless 105mm rifles was established on Fanning Head, in order to watch for amphibious landings and control the entrance to the Sound. On the night of the British landings, 19 men under 2nd Lieutenant Roberto Reyes were manning the outpost, while Esteban and the remainder of the unit were stationed in Port San Carlos settlement.

The British fleet entered San Carlos during the night and at 02:50 was spotted by EC Güemes which opened fire with the mortars and rifles. They were soon engaged by British naval gunfire and a 25-man SBS team; forced to retreat, they lost their communications equipment; but they shot down two Gazelle helicopters with small-arms fire, killing three members of the two aircrews. The first Gazelle's pilot, Sergeant Andrew Evans, was hit and fatally injured, but he managed to crash-land the aircraft into the sea. Evans and the other crewman, Sergeant Edward Candlish, were thrown out of the aircraft, and Argentine troops shot at them for about 15 minutes as they struggled in the water, ignoring orders from their commanding officer to cease fire. When the firing stopped, Candlish managed to drag Evans to shore, where he died. Minutes later, a second British Gazelle helicopter, following the same route as the first, was raked by machine-gun fire from the Argentine platoon and shot down, killing the crew, Lt. Ken Francis and L/Cpl. Pat Giffin.

1st Lt Carlos Daniel Esteban from EC Güemes informed Goose Green garrison about the landings at 08:22 (he was finally evacuated by helicopter on 26 May). The Argentine high command at Stanley initially thought that a landing operation was not feasible at San Carlos and the operation was a diversion. At 10:00, a COAN Aermacchi MB-339 jet based on the islands was dispatched to San Carlos on a reconnaissance flight. In the meantime, the FAA had already started launching their mainland-based aircraft at 09:00. Four Pucaras from Goose Green harassed SAS positions that were directing naval gunfire. Two of the aircraft were shot down by British forces.

Between 10:15 and 17:12, seventeen sorties were carried out by FAA and COAN. Daggers and A-4Cs of the FAA made attacks on HMS Antrim, HMS Argonaut, HMS Broadsword, HMS Brilliant, and HMS Ardent. Sorties of MIIIEA aircraft were used as diversions as well. While many of the bombs did not explode, Ardent and Argonaut were hit, sustaining damage and casualties. Sea Harriers intercepted some of the attackers, destroying 8 FAA aircraft.

=== 22 May ===
HMS Ardent, badly damaged on 21 May, eventually sank early in the morning. Bad weather over the Patagonia airfields prevented the Argentines from carrying out most of their air missions; only a few Skyhawks managed to reach the islands. The British completed their surface-to-air Rapier battery launcher deployments.

=== 23 May ===
On 23 May Argentine aircraft resumed attacking, striking HMS Antelope, HMS Broadsword, and HMS Yarmouth. Only Antelope was damaged, sinking before dawn on 24 May, after an unexploded bomb detonated while being defused. Of the attacking aircraft, two were shot down. An additional COAN pilot was killed after ejecting from his A-4Q after a tyre burst upon landing.

=== 24 May ===
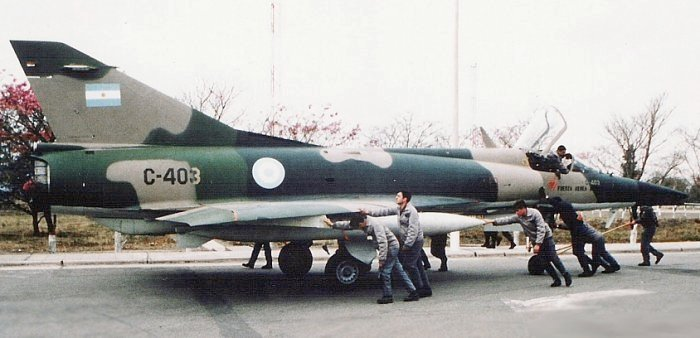
IAI Dagger

On 24 May the Argentine pilots on the continent openly expressed their concern about the lack of collaboration between the three branches of the armed forces, and protested with passive resistance. General Galtieri, acting president of Argentina, decided to visit Comodoro Rivadavia the next day, 25 May (Argentina's National Day), to try to convince them to keep fighting, but when he arrived in the morning the pilots had changed their minds and were already flying to the islands.

Six sorties were launched by the FAA against the British forces. RFA Sir Lancelot and probably Sir Galahad and Sir Bedivere and ground targets were attacked. Four attack aircraft were shot down, with one pilot killed.

=== 25 May ===
Attacks by the FAA on 25 May proved more successful than the previous day. HMS Coventry was sunk after being hit with 500 lb (230 kg) bombs. Attacks on HMS Broadsword damaged the frigate's communication systems and hydraulics and shattered the nose of her Sea Lynx helicopter. RFA Sir Lancelot was also attacked. One sortie accidentally attacked Goose Green, mistaking it for Ajax Bay, and was hit by small arms friendly fire. Three attackers were shot down, one by the combined San Carlos air defences; claims include HMS Yarmouth's Seacat, Rapier, Blowpipe and ship-based gunfire, with two more shot down by Sea Darts fired by HMS Coventry.

List of Sorties
Time	Branch	Aircraft	Callsign	Pilot(s)	Summary
21 May
10:15	COAN	MB339	4-A-115	Lt Guillermo Owen Crippa	A reconnaissance flight flew over the landing force twice to determine the exact composition of the fleet, earning the highest national military decoration, the Argentine Nation to the Heroic Valour in Combat Cross. He attacked HMS Argonaut and an unidentified RFA ship with guns and rockets, then withdrew.
10:15	FAA	Pucara	Tigre	Cpt Benítez; Mj Tomba; 1st Lt Micheloud	Three (of four) planes scrambled from Goose Green and were engaged by gunfire from HMS Ardent. Cpt Benítez was shot down by a Stinger missile fired by the Special Air Service; he ejected and walked back to his base, arriving at 19:00. The other two pilots, Mj Tomba and 1st Lt Micheloud, fired 2.75-inch rockets at a shed apparently used by British forces as an observation post destroying their target, but were intercepted by two Sea Harriers during their escape. Mj Tomba was shot down (ejecting safely) by pilot Nigel Ward, while Lt Micheloud's aircraft escaped and landed at Port Stanley's airfield.
10:20	FAA	MIIIEA			Four aircraft made a diversion north of the islands.
10:25	FAA	Dagger	Leon	Cpt Dimeglio; Lt Castillo	From San Julian, Cpt Dimeglio and Lt Castillo attacked HMS Antrim with their 30mm cannon. Their 1,000 lb (450 kg) bombs failed to explode.
10:30	FAA	Dagger	Ñandú	Cpt Rodhe; Lt Bean	From Rio Grande, Tierra del Fuego, Cpt Rodhe and Lt Bean attacked HMS Argonaut, Lt Bean was shot down by a Sea Wolf SAM from HMS Broadsword; Broadsword was attacked by pilot Cpt Janet.
10:35	FAA	Dagger	Zorro	Cpt Dellepine; Cpt Diaz; Cpt Aguirre-Faget	Cpt Dellepine, Cpt Diaz and Cpt Aguirre-Faget bombed and strafed HMS Brilliant but the bombs hang-up.
10:50	FAA	Dagger	Perro	Mj Martinez; Cpt Moreno; Lt Volponi	Mj Martinez, Cpt Moreno and Lt Volponi attacked HMS Antrim. Their 1,000 lb (450 kg) bombs did not explode, but one of them hit the stern of the destroyer, which also received damage from 30 mm strafing. During their escape, Sea Harriers launched Sidewinders against the Daggers but the missiles fell short.
12:45	FAA	A-4C	Pato	Cpt Almoño; Cpt Garcia; 1st Lt Daniel Manzotti; Lt Nestor Lopez	Intercepted by Sea Harriers; Manzotti and López were shot down and killed by Sidewinders.
12:45	FAA	A-4B	Mula	Cpt Carballo; Ensign Carmona	Mula 2 attacked an unknown ship, most probably the abandoned Argentine cargo vessel Rio Carcaraña, and withdrew, Carballo continued alone and attacked HMS Ardent straddling her with two bombs, both of which failed to explode.
13:37	FAA	A-4B	Leo	1st Lt Filippini; Lt Autiero; Lt Osses; Lt Robledo; Ensign Vottero	Hit HMS Argonaut with 1,000 lb (450 kg) bombs which did not explode, with one crashing through her Sea Cat magazine, detonating two missiles and causing damage and two fatalities among Argonaut's crew.
14:30	FAA	MIIIEA			Two aircraft took off as a diversion.
14:35	FAA	Dagger	Cueca	Cpt Mir Gonzales; Cpt Robles; 1st Lt Luna; Lt Bernhard.	Intercepted by Sea Harriers, and Lt Luna was hit by a Sidewinder but ejected safely. The other three pilots attacked HMS Ardent, and hit the warship with 30 mm gunfire and two 1,000 lb (450 kg) bombs on her stern before returning safely to their base. The frigate's Sea Lynx helicopter was destroyed.
14:53	FAA	Dagger	Laucha	Mj Puga; 1st Lt Román	Attacked HMS Brilliant. The third pilot attacked an unknown ship, probably HMS Antrim.
14:58	FAA	Dagger	Raton	Mj Piuma; Cpt Donadille; 1st lt Senn.	Intercepted by Sea Harriers of Nigel Ward and Lt Thomas. The Daggers dropped their ordnance −2 fuel tanks and one 1,000 lb (450 kg)- and tried to escape, but the three were shot down by Sidewinders, with all pilots ejecting safely. After recovering the pilots, the FAA realised that the San Julian-based Daggers' approach corridor had been discovered and made efforts to correct the situation.
15:15	COAN	A-4Q	Tabanos	Cpt Philipi; Lt Arca; Lt Marquez	Hit HMS Ardent with several 500 lb (230 kg) retarding tail bombs and cannon fire. Two aircraft were shot down by Sea Harriers during their escape, killing Lt Marcelo Márquez. Lt. Philippi ejected safely and, after being sheltered by local farmer Tony Blake during the night, he rejoined the Argentine forces. The third A-4Q, Lt Arca, was damaged and the pilot bailed out into the sea approximately 800 to 1,000 meters off Cape Pembroke, Port Stanley. Arca was rescued from the water by Capt. Jorge "Picho" Svendsen's Huey UH-1H from the Army's 601 Helicopter Battalion. HMS Ardent sank in the morning of 22 May. Both crew were decorated with the Valour in Combat Medal.
17:02	FAA	A-4C			No ships found.
17:12	FAA	A-4B			No ships found.
23 May
13:30	FAA	A-4B	Nene	Carballo; 1st Lt Guadagnini; Lt Rinke; Ensign Gomez	Attacked HMS Broadsword and HMS Antelope. Carballo's plane was damaged by a Sea Cat missile, fired from Antelope, during his bombing run, so he broke off the attack and returned to Rio Gallegos. A second Argentine plane dropped a 1,000 lb (450 kg) bomb on Antelopes starboard side, killing Crewman Mark R. Stephens. Lieutenant Guadagnini was hit and killed by HMS Antelope's 20 mm cannon and crashed through her main mast while carrying out his bombing run; his bombs pierced the frigate's hull without exploding. After the attack, one of these detonated while being defused, sinking the ship.
13:45	COAN	A-4Q	Tabanos	Cpt Castro Fox; Cpt Zubizarreta; Lt Benitez	Attacked HMS Broadsword, HMS Yarmouth and HMS Antelope without visible success. Cpt Carlos María Zubizarreta was killed in Rio Grande, Tierra del Fuego when his parachute did not fully open after he ejected from his A-4Q due to a tyre bursting on landing with his bombs still loaded. The plane stopped by itself and did not suffer any damage.
15:10	FAA	Dagger	Puñal	Mj Martinez; Lt Volponi	Intercepted by Sea Harriers, which shot down the second aircraft, whilst Martinez returned to base.
15:10	FAA	Dagger	Daga		Struck targets inside Ajax Bay
15:10	FAA	Dagger	Coral		Struck targets inside Ajax Bay
24 May
10:15	FAA	A-4B	Chispa; Nene	Com Mariel; 1st Lt Sanchez; Lt Roca; Lt Cervera; Ensign Moroni	Attacked ships inside the bay. RFA Sir Lancelot was hit by a 1,000 lb (450 kg) bomb, which did not explode. Two LCUs are also attacked.
11:02	FAA	Dagger	Azul	Cpt Mir Gonzalez; Cpt Maffeis; Cpt Robles; Lt Bernhardt	Attacked unidentified ships, probably RFA Sir Bedivere, inside the bay.
11:07	FAA	Dagger	Plata	Cpt Dellepiane; 1st Lt Musso; Lt Callejo	Struck ground targets with 500 lb (230 kg) retarding tail bombs.
11:08	FAA	Dagger	Oro	Mj Puga; Cpt Diaz; 1st Lt Castillo	Intercepted and shot down by Sea Harriers. Castillo was killed and the other two ejected safely.
11:20	FAA	A-4C	Halcon	Cpt Pierini; 1st Lt Ureta; Lt Mendez	Intercepted by Sea Harriers but managed to return to base.
11:30	FAA	A-4C	Jaguar	1st Lt Vazquez; Lt Bono; Ensign Martinez	Attacked unidentified ships, possibly RFA Sir Galahad, inside the bay. The three aircraft all received battle damage with Bono's aircraft crashing during the return flight. The other two Skyhawks were rescued by a KC-130 tanker, which approached the islands and delivered 30,000 litres of fuel while accompanying them to the airfield at San Julian.
25 May
09:00	FAA	A-4B	Marte	Cpt Hugo Palaver; Lt Daniel Gálvez	Cpt Hugo Palaver's aircraft was damaged in a friendly fire incident when he and Lt Daniel Gálvez accidentally flew over Goose Green and strafed the pier there, in the belief that they were over Ajax Bay. The main anti-aircraft artillery identified the fighters as friendly and did not fire, but soldiers on the ground engaged with small arms fire. When they returned to the strait, Palaver was shot down by a Sea Dart missile fired by HMS Coventry
12:25	FAA	A-4C	Toro	Cpt Garcia; Lt Lucero; Lt Paredi; Ensign Issac	Attacked ships inside the bay, probably RFA Sir Lancelot. After the attack Lucero was shot down by the San Carlos air defences. He successfully ejected over the landing force, was rescued and then transferred to the hospital ship SS Uganda. A Sea Dart, fired by HMS Coventry, shot down Garcia, whose aircraft had been damaged by small arms fire during the attack, to the North of San Carlos. Cpt Garcia ejected, but was not recovered and died. Ensign Isaac was losing fuel but was rescued by the KC-130, which accompanied him to his base while refuelling him in flight.
15:20	FAA	A-4B	Vulcano	Cpt Carballo; Lt Carlos Rinke	Attacked HMS Broadsword,^{picture from ship}damaging the frigate's communication systems and hydraulics and electrics and shattering the nose of her Sea Lynx helicopter^{Pictures of the Damage}
15:20	FAA	A-4B	Zeus	1st Lt Velasco; Ensign Barrionuevo	Attacked and sank destroyer HMS Coventry after hitting the ship with three 500 lb (230 kg) bombs.^{British video} ^{Argentine video}

== Aftermath ==
British troops yomp to Stanley

I think the Argentine pilots are showing great bravery, it would be foolish of me to say anything else

— John Nott, British Defence Minister

In spite of the British air defence network, the Argentine pilots were able to attack their targets but serious procedural failures prevented them from getting better results – most notably, shortcomings of their bomb fuses. Thirteen bombs hit British ships without detonating. Lord Craig, the retired Marshal of the Royal Air Force, is said to have remarked: "Six better fuses and we would have lost".

The British warships, although themselves suffering most of the attacks, were successful in keeping the strike aircraft away from the landing ships, which were well inside the bay. With the British troops on Falklands soil, a land campaign followed until Argentine General Mario Menéndez surrendered to British Major General Jeremy Moore on 15 June in Stanley.

The subsonic Harrier jump-jet, armed with the AIM-9L Sidewinder air-to-air missile, proved capable as an air superiority fighter.

The actions had a profound impact on later naval practice. During the 1980s most warships from navies around the world were retrofitted with close-in weapon systems and guns for self-defence. First reports of the number of Argentine aircraft shot down by British missile systems were subsequently revised down.

== See also ==
- Argentine air forces in the Falklands War
- British naval forces in the Falklands War
- Battle of Crete
