= Falklands War order of battle: Argentine air forces =

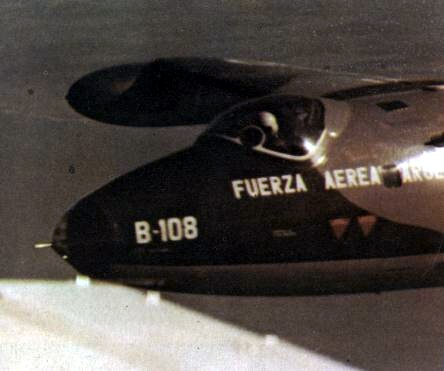
Canberra B-108

This article describes the composition and actions of the Argentine air forces in the Falklands War (Spanish: Guerra de las Malvinas), which comprised units of the Air Force, Army, Navy and other services.

For a description of air forces of the United Kingdom, see Falklands War order of battle: British air forces.

== Background ==
Despite initiating the war, Argentina had not prepared a plan for the subsequent defence of the islands. The military dictatorship that governed the country at the time regarded the seizure of the Falklands as a political act to obtain a diplomatic bargaining position, and not as an act of war. Consequently they were taken by surprise when the British responded with a large-scale mobilization, and a task force to retake the islands.

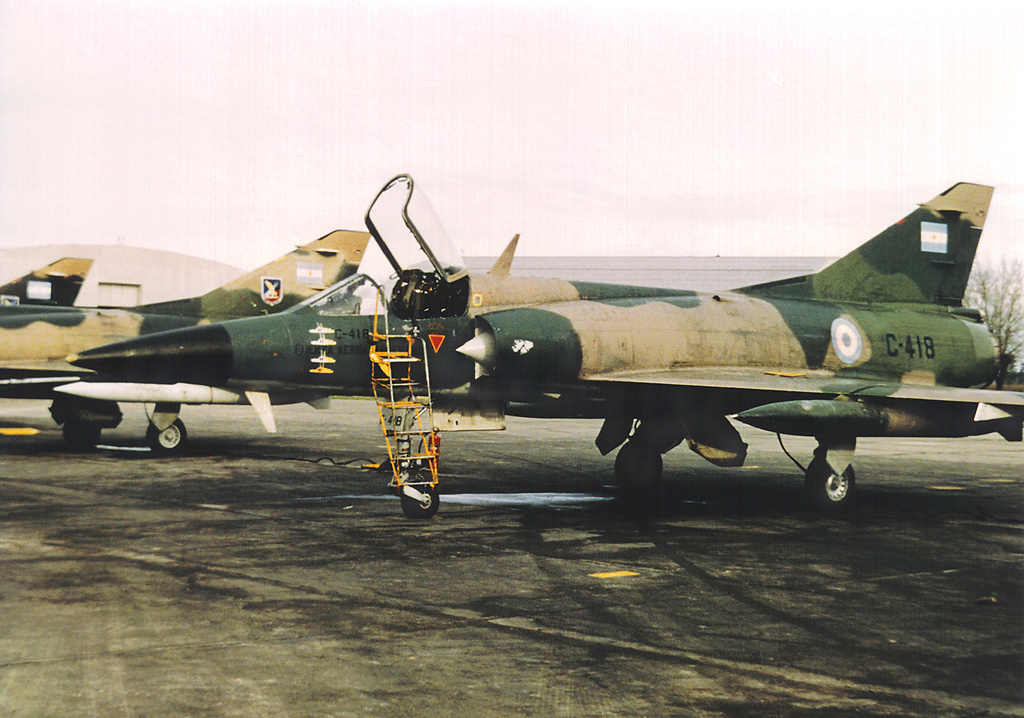
IAI Dagger, Argentine Air Force, 1984

The Argentine Air Force (Fuerza Aérea Argentina; FAA), which had never fought against an external enemy since its establishment in 1912, had never considered the possibility of waging a long-range naval air campaign against a major NATO power. It was not trained or equipped for such a mission. The FAA had only two tanker aircraft to serve the entirety of the air force and navy, and its fighter-bomber Mirage IIIs and IAI Daggers were not equipped for aerial refuelling. The FAA's training, tactics and equipment were focused on a possible war against Chile, resulting from disputes such as the Beagle conflict.

The option to attack Chile was a cause of great concern to the Argentina military during the war. The Chilean armed forces had deployed a significant force to Chile's common border with Argentina, and the FAA was forced to reinstate their retired F-86 Sabres to bolster Argentina's air defences. In Argentina's favour, Peru immediately offered its support to the Argentine cause, with the Peruvian Air Force even offering to fly combat missions. This was politely declined by the Argentine government. As the war progressed, Peru and Venezuela sent critical aircraft spare parts to Argentina, urgently needed by the FAA and the Brazilian Air Force gave two EMB111 Bandeirantes maritime patrol aircraft to the Argentine Navy. Finally on June 4, ten Peruvian Mirage 5 with AS-30 missiles arrived to Tandil but the war ended before they could be used. Israel Aircraft Industries technicians that were in the country under the 1979 IAI Daggers contract continued their work during the conflict.

By the best estimates, Argentina had about 240 planes when the war broke out. About half of those were posted in the interior and along the Chilean border. The long distances from their bases prevented them from using their top speed or they risked running out of fuel. (Note: "the Mach 2 Mirage and Dagger which in low-level attack are extremely subsonic. ..while low-level attacks by the Argentine aircraft..there would not be a lot of fuel to spare, especially if afterburner was used." From Aviation Fact File - Harrier (1984), page 42.) Although the Argentines had more aeroplanes than the British Task force, a good number of them were Pucara turboprops. (Note: "The Argentine-built Pucará counter-insurgency aircraft proved its worth in numerous attacks on British land forces, and it was even used to attack shipping. About 75 Pucarás were in service at the start of the conflict." From Sea Combat off the Falklands (1982), page 33; by Antony Preston; Willow Books, ISBN 978-0-00-218046-7.) Also, the A-4 Skyhawk force were dependent on the two available KC-130 tankers, limiting the number of aeroplanes which could attack simultaneously.

Argentina's fleet of A-4 Skyhawk attack jets was in very poor condition. The arms embargo placed by the United States in 1976, due to the "Dirty War", had made most airframes unusable. The involvement of Israel in helping to return the A-4 to full operational status has been alleged, but has never been confirmed.

The small air arm of the Argentine Navy (Armada Republica Argentina; ARA) was in the middle of the transition from the A-4Q Skyhawk to the new Super Étendard. Only five of the Étendard's anti-ship Exocet missiles had been delivered at the time of the conflict, at which point an arms embargo prevented the delivery of further shipments. Additionally, the required programming for the missiles to interact with the Étendard's computers had not been completed by French engineers when the conflict broke out. France, being an ally of the United Kingdom, recalled all technicians, which left Argentine scientists and electronic engineers to figure out a way to make the missiles take input from the plane's computers. Navy pilots, particularly those of the 3rd Naval Fighters Squadron flying A-4Qs, were the only personnel trained in bombing warships. Air Force pilots trained during April against the two Argentine Type 42 destroyers, similar to those of the British Fleet, and according to the Naval officers all the sorties were shot down, causing great concern to the High Command until the successful May 1 strikes which proved that aircraft could survive.

Finally, Argentine military aviation had never been involved in an international conflict, indeed the last time the Argentine military had been involved in an international conflict was the War of the Triple Alliance more than a century before.

In spite of these disadvantages, Argentine air units bore the brunt of the battle during the six-week war, and inflicted serious damage and losses to the naval forces of the United Kingdom. Low-flying jets attacking British ships provided some of the most sobering and dramatic images of the war. By the end of the conflict, the British forces had come to admire the FAA's spirited conduct in the face of an effective air defence network. (Note: "The British were awed by the courage of the Argentine pilots, flying suicidally low to attack, then vanishing amid flashes of pursuing Sea Cat, Blowpipe, Rapier, racing across the sky behind them. Alone among the enemy's three services, the air force seemed highly motivated and utterly committed to the battle. 'We should have been able to work out that any nation which produces first-class Formula One racing drivers is also likely to turn out some pretty good pilots.'" - Chapter 12; Hastings, Max: The Battle for the Falklands (1983) Michael Joseph Ltd ISBN 0-7181-2228-3) Admiral Sandy Woodward, the British Task Force commander said: "[t]he Argentine Air Force fought extremely well and we felt a great admiration for what they did."

The British Operational Research Branch Report declassified and released to the public in February 2013 states:

The Argentine air arms conducted a 10 week campaign during which time they carried out air supply of their forces in the Falkland Islands, reconnaissance of UK forces in the South Atlantic, and engaged units of TF317. Though they sustained considerable damage, it is fair to say that their air forces were not beaten and remained as a viable force at the end of hostilities. The 4 air arms ^{(ndlr: FAA, COAN, CAE, PNA)} were, within their own spheres, generally capable and well organised, though limited in AAR and reconnaissance assets. A lack of aircraft spares may also have limited their effectiveness. Of the 3 facets of operations, the Argentine air arms are considered to have been successful in the air supply of their forces, only partially successful in the reconnaissance task, and to have inflicted significant attrition on UK naval forces. No militarily significant success was achieved against UK land forces ashore.

== Organisation ==
The air units involved in the Falklands War were under the following chain of command:

- Military junta — Brigadier General ^{(Lieutenant General)} Basilio Lami Dozo.
  - Air Defence Command (Spanish: Comando Aéreo de Defensa) — Brigadier Jorge Hughes was in charge of the radar network, Mirage IIIEA interceptors and anti-aircraft defences on the mainland.
  - Strategic Air Command (Spanish: Comando Aéreo Estratégico) — Brigadier Helmuth Weber. Coordinated air assets through all the country. The CAE also had the main role of long range maritime surveillance with Boeing 707s and C-130 Hercules.
    - Southern Air Force (Spanish: Fuerza Aérea Sur) — Brigadier Ernesto Crespo. The FAS was the main organisation involved in combat over the conflict zone.
  - South Atlantic Military Theatre (Spanish: Teatro Operaciones Atlantico Sur) — Vice Admiral Juan Lombardo. Basically a naval command with the role of coordinating the air, surface and submarine assets in the South Atlantic area. Initially, during the invasion of the islands on 2 April and before hostilities broke out, the islands were supposedly to be under their command and was considered as the only organisation needed to manage the crisis.
    - Falklands Military Garrison (Spanish: Guarnicion Militar Malvinas) — Brigade General Mario Menéndez (Army).
      - Air Component (Spanish: Componente Aéreo) — Brigadier Luis Castellano.

== Deployment ==
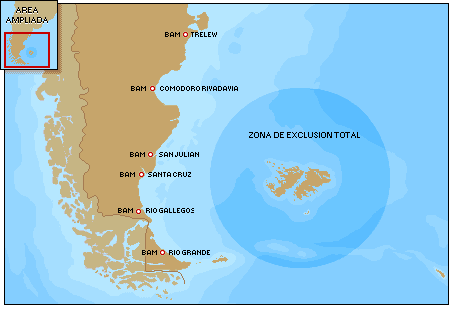
Argentine airbases: Distances to Port Stanley Airport: Trelew: 580 nautical miles (1,070 km), Comodoro Rivadavia: 480 nautical miles (890 km), San Julián: 425 nautical miles (787 km), Rio Gallegos: 435 nautical miles (806 km) and Rio Grande: 380 nautical miles (700 km). Due to the distance required to fly to the islands, two minutes was the average time Argentine attack aircraft had available in the target area.

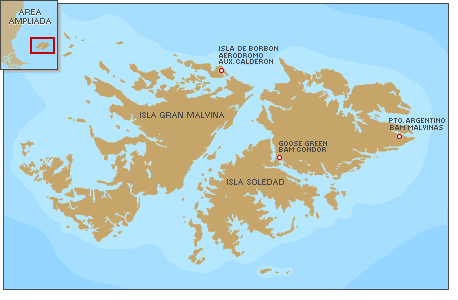
Argentine airfields The only paved runway was at Stanley although was unsuitable for fast jets and its main role was to maintain the airbridge to the mainland. Isla de Borbon - Pebble Island, Pto. Argentino - Port Stanley, Isla Gran Malvina - West Falkland & Isla Soledad - East Falkland.

Air units moved from home bases to southern facilities. Amid fears about British/Chilean air strikes and/or SAS raids, Argentine aircraft were dispersed in the surrounding areas of their southern airfields, e.g., several parts of the national route #3 were used for this purpose.

- Ezeiza International Airport, Buenos Aires
  - Boeing 707
- NAS Almirante Zar, Trelew, Chubut Province
  - B.Mk62 Canberra
- AFB Comodoro Rivadavia, IX Air Brigade, Chubut Province ( FAS command site ) ^{map}
  - KC/C-130 Hercules
  - Fokker F28
  - Escuadron Fenix
  - Mirage IIIEA
  - FMA IA 58 Pucará
  - CIC Comodoro, air traffic control center
- Airfield Puerto San Julián, Santa Cruz Province
  - IAI Dagger — La Marinete Squadron
  - A-4C Skyhawk
  - Cardion AN/TPS-44 radar w/ GADA 601 Army
- Airfield Puerto Santa Cruz, Santa Cruz Province
  - A-4P Skyhawk
- AFB Rio Gallegos, Santa Cruz Province
  - Mirage IIIEA
  - A-4P Skyhawk
  - FMA IA 58 Pucará
  - Navy Exploration Squadron after 13 May: S-2E Trackers and 2 leased Brazilian Air Force EMB111 Bandeirantes (2-P-201 & 2-P-202)
  - CIC Gallegos, air traffic control center
- NAS Almirante Quijada, Río Grande, Tierra del Fuego
  - IAI Dagger — Las Avutardas Salvajes Squadron
  - A-4Q Skyhawk
  - Super Étendard
  - SP-2H Neptune
- AFB Puerto Argentino, Port Stanley Airport, Falkland Islands
  - FMA IA 58 Pucará Air Force
  - Aermacchi MB.339A Navy
  - T-34 Mentor Navy
  - Helicopters from all services
  - CIC Malvinas, AN/TPS-43 radar and anti-aircraft defences from all services
- AFB Condor, Goose Green grass airfield, Falkland Islands
  - FMA IA 58 Pucará Air Force
  - Anti-aircraft cannons Air Force
- NAS Calderon, Pebble Island grass airfield, Falkland Islands
  - FMA IA 58 Pucará Air Force
  - T-34 Mentor Navy
  - Short Skyvan Coast Guard
- Aircraft carrier ARA Veinticinco de Mayo, _{April 2 to May 3}
  - McDonnell Douglas A-4Q Skyhawk
  - Grumman S-2E Tracker
  - Sikorsky S-61D-4

== Units ==
The numbers in bold are the number of aircraft engaged in combat without counting those in reserve, the numbers in brackets are the number of aircraft lost during the war.

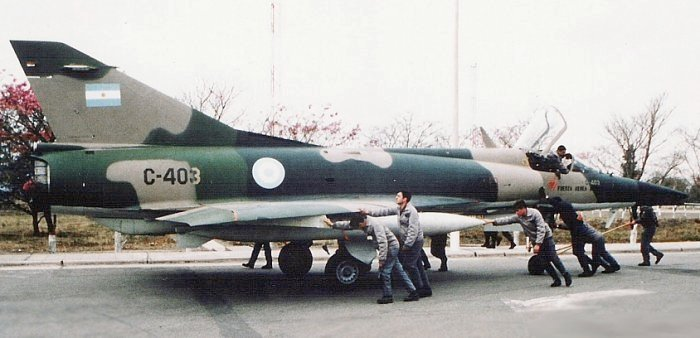
Israel supplied 39 IAI Dagger since 1978

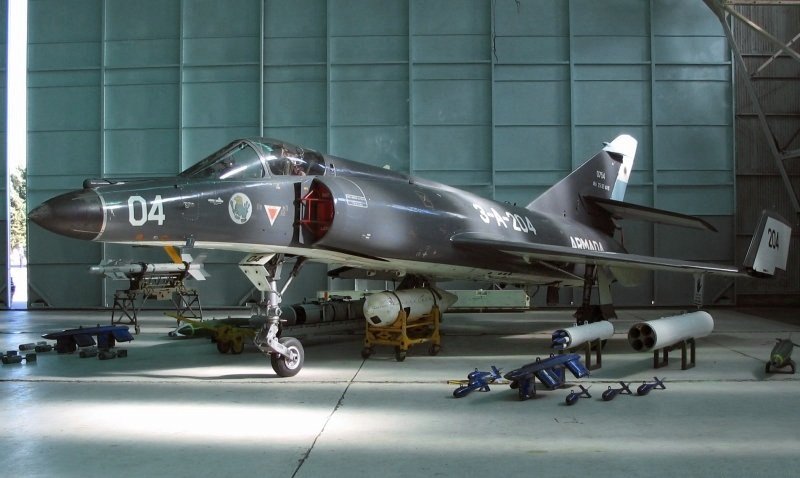
The Super Etendard was the platform for the Exocet missile.

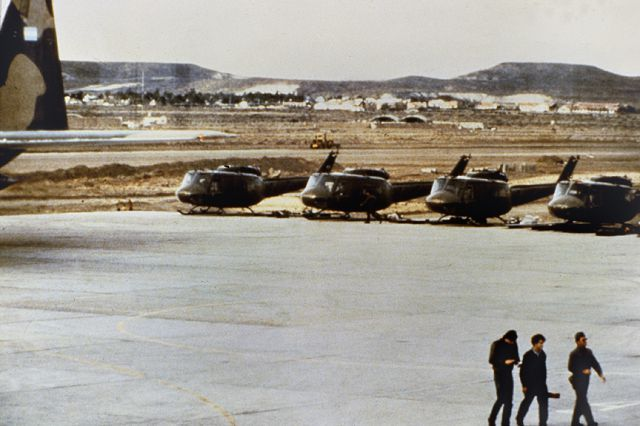
UH-1H Iroquois "Huey" helicopters, at Comodoro Rivadavia Airport. These ones were to be transported to the islands by C-130H "Hercules" aircraft and their rotors had been removed.

=== Argentine Air Force ===
Spanish: Fuerza Aérea Argentina

- 1st Air Brigade:
  - Lockheed C-130H Hercules **7 (1)**
  - Lockheed KC-130H Hercules Tanker **2**
  - Boeing 707-320C **3**
  - Fokker F-28-1000C **6**
  - Fokker F-27-400M **12**
- 2nd Air Brigade:
  - English Electric B.62 Canberra **8 (2)**
  - Grupo Aérofotográfico — Learjet 35A **2 (1)**
- 3rd Air Brigade:
  - Falkland Islands — FMA IA 58A Pucará **24 (13)**
  - Comodoro Rivadavia — FMA IA 58A Pucará **1 (1)**
- 4th Air Brigade:
  - McDonnell Douglas A-4C Skyhawk **16 (9)**
- 5th Air Brigade:
  - McDonnell Douglas A-4B Skyhawk **30 (10)**
- 6th Air Brigade:
  - Israel Aircraft Industries Dagger **27 (11)**
- 7th Air Brigade:
  - Lockheed C-130E Hercules **3**
  - Boeing CH-47C Chinook **2**
  - Bell 212 **2**
- 8th Air Brigade:
  - Dassault Mirage IIIEA **16 (2)**
  - DHC-6-200 **1**

=== Argentine Navy ===
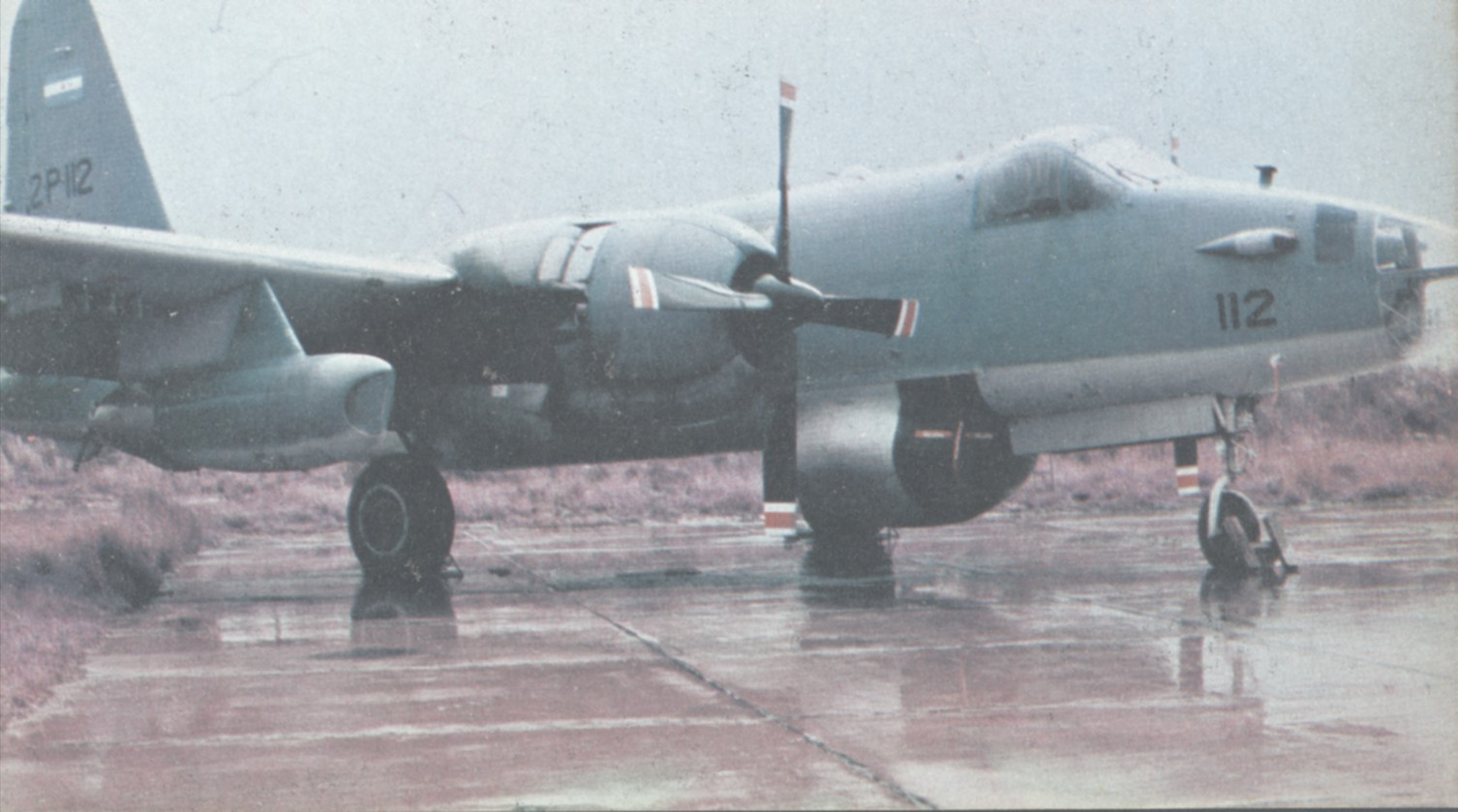
The Argentine Navy SP-2H which tracked HMS Sheffield

Spanish: Comando de Aviación Naval Argentina — COAN (Argentine Naval Aviation)

- 1st Naval Air Attack Squadron:
  - Aermacchi MB.339A **6 (2)**
- 2nd Naval Air Fighter/Attack Squadron:
  - Dassault Super Étendard **4** (sn. 3-A-201 was cannibalized for spare parts)
- 3rd Naval Air Fighter/Attack Squadron:
  - McDonnell Douglas A-4Q Skyhawk **8 (3)**
- Naval Air Antisubmarine Squadron:
  - Grumman S-2E Tracker **6**
- Naval Air Training Squadron:
  - Beechcraft T-34C-1 Turbo Mentor **4 (4)**
- Naval Air Exploration Squadron:
  - Lockheed SP-2H Neptune **2** (both retired by end of May due to airframe attrition)
- 1st Naval Air Helicopter Squadron:
  - Aérospatiale Alouette AI03 SA361B **10 (1)**
  - Lynx Mk.23 **2 (1)**
  - Britten-Norman BN-2A Islander **1**
- 2nd Naval Air Helicopter Squadron:
  - Sikorsky S-61D-4 **5**
- Naval Air Transport Squadrons:
  - Lockheed L-188PF Electra **3**
  - Fokker F-28-3000C **3**
  - P-95 Bandeirulha **2**

=== Argentine Army ===
Spanish: Comando de Aviación del Ejército Argentino (Argentine Army Aviation)

- 601 Army Aviation Battalion:
  - Boeing CH-47C Chinook **2 (1)**
  - Agusta A109A **3 (1)**
  - Bell UH-1H Iroquois **9**
  - Aérospatiale Puma SA330L **6 (6)**

=== Argentine Coast Guard ===
Spanish: Prefectura Naval Argentina

- Aviation Service:
  - Aérospatiale Puma SA330L **1**
  - Short Skyvan 3M-200 **5 (2)**

=== Argentine auxiliary aircraft ===
- Escuadrón Fénix — **77** civilian business planes:
  - Agusta 109C **1**
  - Aero Commander 500B **2**
  - Aero Commander 500S/Shrike Commander **1**
  - Aero Commander 680FL Grand Commander **1**
  - Aero Commander AC690A **2**
  - Aero Commander AC690B **2**
  - Aero Commander AC690C **1**
  - Bell 205A-1 **1**
  - Bell 206 **1**
  - Bell 212 **1**
  - MBB Bo 105A **4**
  - Cessna500 Citation I **4**
  - Cessna501 Citation I **1**
  - Cessna550 Citation II **1**
  - C-47B-15-DK **2**
  - DC-3 **2**
  - Gates Learjet24 **1**
  - Gates Learjet24A **2**
  - Gates Learjet24D **1**
  - Gates Learjet25D **3**
  - Gates Learjet35 **4**
  - Gates Learjet35A **1**
  - Gates Learjet36A **1**
  - Gates Learjet36C **1**
  - Hawker Siddeley HS.125-700B **1**
  - IA50G2 Guaraní II **1**
  - Mitsubishi MU-2B-26A **4**
  - MD 500C **3**
  - Piper Aerostar600A **11**
  - Piper Aerostar TS600 **5**
  - Piper Aerostar TS601A **1**
  - Piper Aerostar TS601B **1**
  - Piper Aerostar TS601P **1**
  - SA226-T Merlin IIIB **1**
  - Sikorsky S-61N **2**
  - Sikorsky S-58T **2**
- Aerolíneas Argentinas and Austral airlines:
  - Boeing 737-200 **2**
  - BAC 1-11-515FB **1** (airlift to Patagonia and Port Stanley)

== Armament ==
- Machine guns and autocannons:
  - 7.62 mm FM M2-20: Pucaras
  - 20 mm Colt Mk.12 Cannon: A-4s
  - 20 mm Hispano-Suiza HS.804 Cannon: Pucaras
  - 30 mm DEFA cannon: IAI Daggers and Mirage IIIEA
- Unguided rockets:
  - ZUNI 127 mm: MB.339s
  - 70 mm: MB339s
  - 105 mm: Pucaras
- Missiles:
  - Air-to-Air:
    - AIM-9B Sidewinder short-range IR: only Navy A-4Q Skyhawks up to May 1
    - Rafael Shafrir 2 short-range IR: IAI Daggers and A-4C on May 1
    - Matra R550 Magic short-range IR: received April 15 for Mirage IIIEA (Note: According to Aeroespacio, Issue 520: "hacia el 15 Abr se producía la recepción de los misiles Matra 550 Magic adquiridos tiempo antes" ("towards April 15th the Matra 550 Magic missiles bought time ago were received"))
    - Matra R530 short-range semi-active radar and IR: Mirage IIIEA
  - Air-to-Surface:
    - Aérospatiale AM.39 Exocet Anti-Ship Missile: 5 units on Super Etendards
    - AS 30 air-surface missiles. Supplied by the Peruvian Air Force and arriving at the Tandil AFB (home base of the FAA Dagger) at the end of May, the war ended before they could be used.
- Unguided retarded Gravity bomb: Thirteen bombs hit British ships without detonating as they were dropped from very low altitude and there was insufficient time in the air for them to arm themselves. The problem was solved by June with new fuzes (Kappa) bought in Spain.
  - US built Mark 82 Snake Eye (500 lb / 227 kg): A-4Q
  - British built "1000 lb" (450 kg): A-4B/C, IAI Daggers and Canberras
  - Spain built Expal BR/BRP 250 kg: A-4B/C and IAI Daggers
  - Argentine built PG 125 kg: Pucaras
  - Napalm: Pucaras (Note: "In late afternoon Pucaras attacked the British forces, two dropping napalm tanks which only just missed forward troops. Two Pucaras were shot down during the battle, along with an Aeromacchi [sic]". - Chapter 21 The Bridgehead and Beyond, the battle for Darwin and Goose Green - Lawrence Freedman, Signals of War, The Falklands Conflict of 1982, 1990, Faber and Faber-London, ISBN 0-571-14116-1)

== Air campaign ==
- Battle of San Carlos (1982)
- Bluff Cove Air Attacks

=== Missions ===
- Attack Missions:

System	Obs
A-4 Skyhawk	133 sorties by the A-4B and 86 by the A-4C. They flew with unreliable ejection seats due to the US embargo placed from 1977. Naval A-4Q performed 12 sorties. They were highly dependent on the two available KC-130 tankers, limiting the number of aeroplanes that could attack simultaneously.
Canberra	46 bombing sorties against ground targets, operating from Trelew, to avoid more congestion on the closer southern airfields.
Dagger	153 sorties against naval/ground targets by the two squadrons. Their lack of aerial refueling capacity severely affected their performance without any chance of manoeuvring over the islands. They were obliged to fly the shortest flightpath and had less than 10 minutes to find their targets. The discovery of their approach corridor by the British led to 7 aircraft being shot down by Sea Harriers CAP, something just realized when one of the downed Dagger pilots was recovered by own troops. By the end of May they began carrying an improvised chaff dispenser consisting of aluminium strips inside their airbrakes.
Total Sorties:	The above figures shown a total of 430 attack sorties from the mainland of which 18 aircraft were intercepted by the Sea Harriers and another 14 were shot down by anti aircraft defences.

- Other Missions:

System	Obs
Mirage IIIEA	Argentine sources indicate that a number were withdrawn from operations over the islands to protect the mainland against Vulcan strikes, (Note: According to Globalsecurity.org (DWF):"As a result of these heavy losses...it was decided to pull the Mirage III's back to the mainland to stand alert for a possible Vulcan attack.") (Note: According to Globalsecurity.org (HJA):"Finally, the bombing raids caused the Argentines to fear an air attack on the mainland, causing them to retain some Mirage aircraft and Roland missiles for defense.") (Note: As per article "La familia Mirage" in Aeroespacio (Issue 520): "Los M III debían defender el territorio continental argentino de posibles ataques de los bombarderos Vulcan de la RAF, brindar escolta a los cazabombarderos de la FAA, e impedir los ataques de aviones de la Royal Navy y de la RAF sobre las Malvinas." ("The M III would defend the Argentine mainland against possible attacks by Vulcan bombers from the RAF, providing escort of fighter bombers to the FAA, and to prevent attacks by aircraft of the Royal Navy and RAF on the Falklands.")) however, they made 58 sorties providing decoys for the strike units with particular success on the June 8 attacks against the British landings ships. Their lesser internal fuel capacity, compared to the Daggers, prevented them from being used in their escort role.
Boeing 707	The unarmed airliner made 54 cargo flights and other 61 for reconnaissance and surveillance duties against the British Task Force heading south^{FAA map} locating the fleet for the first time on April 21 when a Sea Harrier attempted to intercept the 707 on May 22 causing it to retreat. Another 707 managed to evade 4 Sea Dart missiles launched against it but the risk of further sorties was too great and from that point on the 707's made no further attempt to find the Task Force. On another occasion they made a casual encounter with a British Nimrod both unarmed aircraft looked each other over and continued their missions.
Embraer P-95 Bandeirulha	Two aircraft were incorporated into the naval aviation on May 21. They flew 39 maritime patrol sorties from Rio Gallegos airbase. They were returned to the Brazilian air force on June 24
IA 58 Pucará	They performed reconnaissance and ground attack missions from the Falklands airfields and surveillance of the Patagonian coast from bases in Southern Argentina. Most of the island-based Pucarás were destroyed on the ground, due to special forces actions. They shot down a Royal Marines Westland Scout during the battle of Goose Green.
Fenix Squadron	126 decoying plus 52 reconnaissance sorties. They were also extensively used as communications relay and pathfinder flights to guide the combat jets with the Learjets' superior navigation systems.
C-130 Hercules	33 night flights to BAM Puerto Argentino in May/June (Blockade runner). Among the cargo transported in those flight were the 602 Army Commandos Coy, 155 mm CITEFA cannons, an improvised land based Exocet launcher, the Roland SAM system and a RASIT radar replacement. They evacuated 263 wounded and a British PoW in their returning flights. Starting 15 May, they also took over the dangerous task of searching for naval targets for the strike units, after the retirement of the last SP-2H Neptune available. On one of these daylight missions, a Hercules was intercepted and shot down by a Sea Harrier. 29 May, the British tanker British Wye was hit by bombs dropped by a Hercules, north of South Georgia ^{(Not officially recognized by the FAA)}
KC-130 Hercules	Refueling sorties for A-4s and Super Étendards, also for battle damaged fighters.
Fokker F-28 _{Navy}	15 night flights to BAM Puerto Argentino in May/June (Blockade runner)
Army Aviation	796 helicopter flights on the islands
1st Air Brigade Construction Group _{Air Force}	In charge of maintaining Port Stanley airbase operable. Throughout the conflict, the airport installations were attacked with 237 bombs, 1,200 shells from the Royal Navy gunline and 16 missiles, however, it was never out of action entirely. Many sources claim that the runway was covered with piles of dirt during the day causing British intelligence to surmise that repairs were still in progress. Craters were in fact heaps of earth placed there to make it look as though the runway was damaged. In fact, the British were well aware that the runway was still in use by C-130 and attempted to interdict these flights leading to the loss of a C-130 on June 1.

=== Successes ===
Description	Notes
Ships Sunk	HMS Sheffield, HMS Coventry, HMS Ardent, HMS Antelope, RFA Sir Galahad, Atlantic Conveyor plus a Landing Craft Utility ("Foxtrot Four" from Fearless)
Ships Damaged	HMS Glasgow, HMS Antrim, HMS Brilliant, HMS Broadsword, HMS Alacrity, HMS Arrow, HMS Argonaut, HMS Plymouth, RFA Sir Bedivere, RFA Sir Lancelot, RFA Sir Tristram, RFA Stromness
Aircraft Destroyed	1 Scout helicopter shot down 3 Chinook HC.1 destroyed aboard Atlantic Conveyor on 25 May, 3 Westland Lynx HAS.2 destroyed aboard Ardent on 21 May, Coventry and Atlantic Conveyor on 25 May; 6 Westland Wessex HU.5 lost aboard Atlantic Conveyor on 25 May

=== Casualties and aircraft losses ===
Human losses

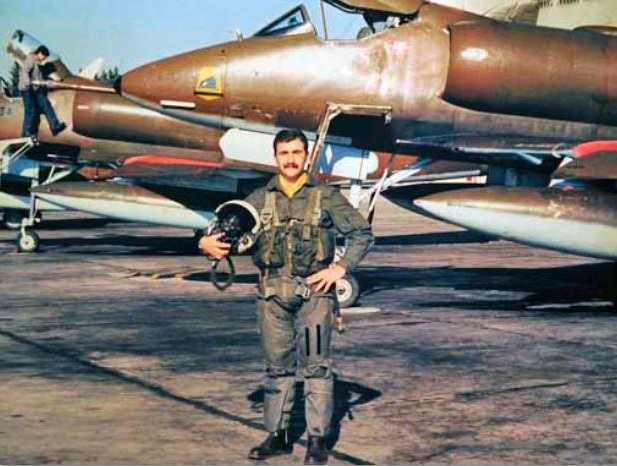
Air Force pilot Alfredo Jorge Alberto Vázquez, who was killed in action over Bluff Cove (Spanish: Bahía Agradable)

- 6 Army aviation
- 4 Naval aviation
- 55 Argentine Air Force members
  - 29 pilots
  - 12 air crew (6 on C-130H shot down June 1, 4 on Learjet LJ-35A shot down June 7, and 2 Canberra navigators)
  - 14 Ground crew

Aircraft losses

Aircraft lost in the air in combat

Argentine strike aircraft did not carry air-to-air missiles, with the exception of 8th Air Brigade Mirage IIIEA fighters and 6th Air Brigade Daggers on May 1. All retained a secondary armament of either 20 mm or 30 mm cannon.

11	IAI Dagger A	9 by Sea Harrier, (Note: SN: C-403, May21, Sea Harrier ZA190/"009", pilot Capt. Donadille ejected, C-404, May21, Sea Harrier ZA190/"009", pilot Maj. Piuma ejected, C-407, May21, Sea Harrier ZA175/"004", pilot Lt. Senn ejected, C-409, May21, Sea Harrier XZ455/"12", pilot Lt. Luna ejected, C-410, May24, Sea Harrier ZA193/"93", pilot Lt. Castillo killed, C-419, May24, Sea Harrier XZ457/"14". pilot Maj. Puga ejected, C-430, May24, Sea Harrier XZ457/"14". pilot Capt. Diaz ejected, C-433, May1, Sea Harrier XZ455/"12". pilot Lt. Ardiles killed, C-437, May23, Sea Harrier ZA194. pilot Lt. Volponi killed) 1 Sea Wolf HMS Broadsword, (Note: SN: C-428, May21, pilot Lt. Bean killed) 1 SAM Rapier (Note: SN: C-436, May29, pilot Lt. Bernhardt killed)
10	A-4B Skyhawk	3 (Note: SN: C-204, C-226 and C-228) by Sea Harrier, 3 (Note: SN: C-206, C-208 and C-246) Sea Wolf HMS Brilliant, 1 (Note: SN: C-244) Sea Dart, 1 (Note: SN: C-215) AAA HMS Fearless, 1 (Note: SN: C-242) 20mm cannon fire from HMS Antelope and 1 (Note: SN: C-248) friendly fire
7	A-4C Skyhawk	2 (Note: SN: C-309 and C-325) by Sea Harrier, 3 (Note: SN: C-301, C-304 and C-310) Sea Dart, 1 (Note: SN: C-319) SeaCat from HMS Yarmouth, 1 (Note: SN: C-305) combination SeaCat/Rapier/Blowpipe
3	FMA IA 58 Pucará	1 (Note: SN: A-511) by Sea Harrier, 1 SAM Stinger, 1 small arms fire 2 PARA
3	A-4Q Skyhawk Navy	3 (Note: SN: 3-A-307, 3-A-312 and 3-A-314. One was damaged by 30 mm cannon fire, attempted to land at Port Stanley but the undercarriage was inoperative and the pilot elected to eject.) by Sea Harrier.
2	Mirage IIIEA	1 (Note: SN: I-015) by Sea Harrier, 1 (Note: SN: I-019) friendly fire
2	B.Mk62 Canberra	1 (Note: SN: B-110) by Sea Harrier, 1 (Note: SN: B-108) Sea Dart
1	C-130E Hercules	1 by Sea Harrier
1	Aermacchi MB.339A Navy	1 by Blowpipe
1	Learjet 35A	1 by SAM Sea Dart
4	Puma SA330L Army	1 to small arms fire during the Invasion of South Georgia on 3 April, 1 by a Sea Dart SAM on 9 May, (Note: SN: AE-505, May 9, during search for Narwal trawler; fatalities: 1st Lt. Fiorito, 1st Lt. Buschiazzo, Sarg Dimotta.) 1 crashed due to Harrier wingtip vortices on 23 May, and 1 to a FIM-92 Stinger missile on 30 May.

Total destroyed in the air: 45 (Sea Harrier 21, Sea Dart 7, Sea Wolf 4, Stinger 2, Sea Cat 1, Rapier 1, Blowpipe 1, Combination/Gunfire 6, Friendly fire 2)

Aircraft lost by other causes

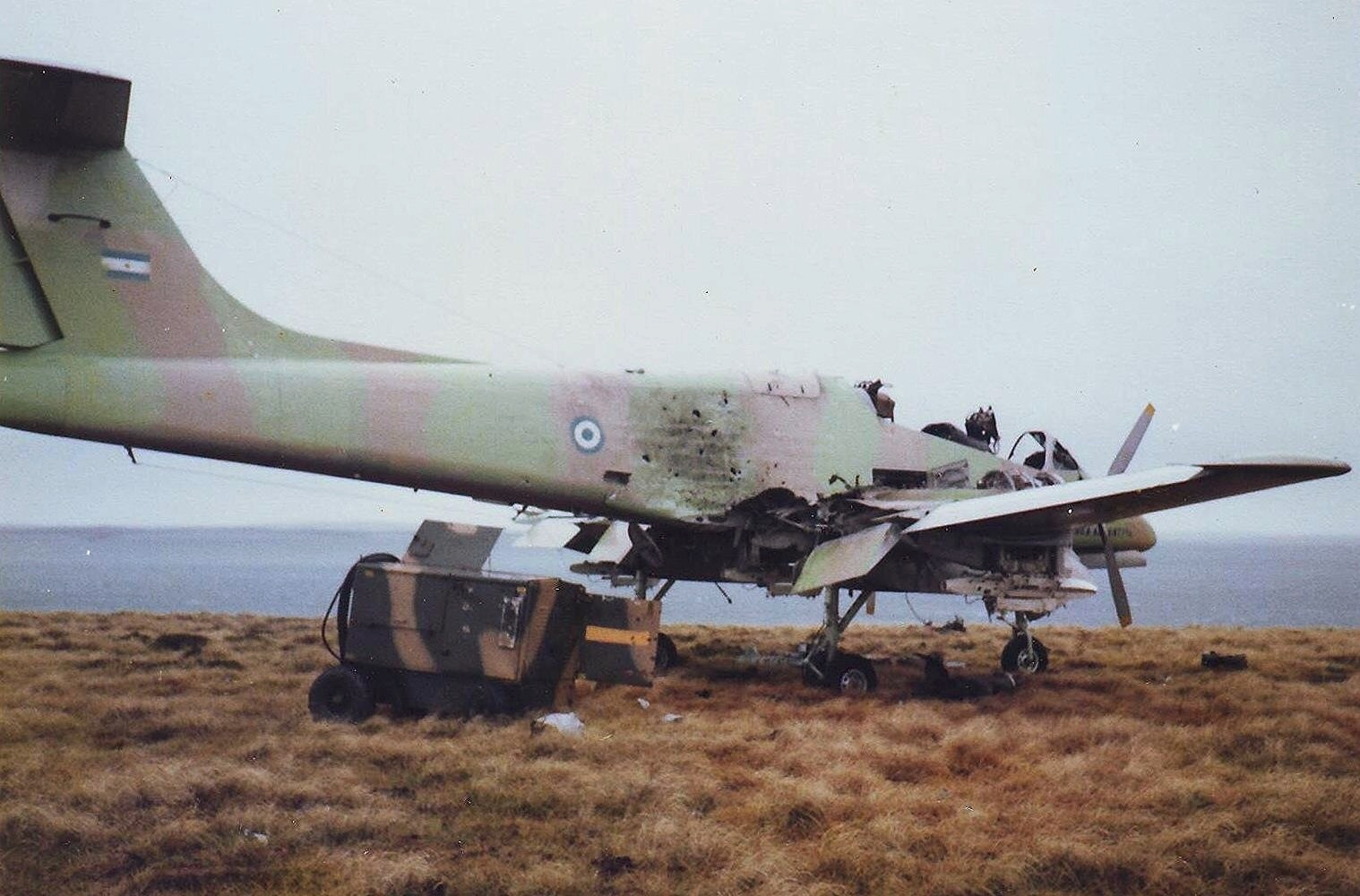
A destroyed "Pucará" at Pebble Island, 1982

- Destroyed on the ground
  - 9 FMA IA 58 Pucará
  - 1 Agusta A109 Army
  - 1 Boeing Ch-47C Chinook Army
  - 2 Aérospatiale Puma SA330L Army
  - 4 Beechcraft T-34 Mentor Navy
  - 2 Skyvan 3-M Coast Guard
  - 2 Bell UH-1H Iroquois Army

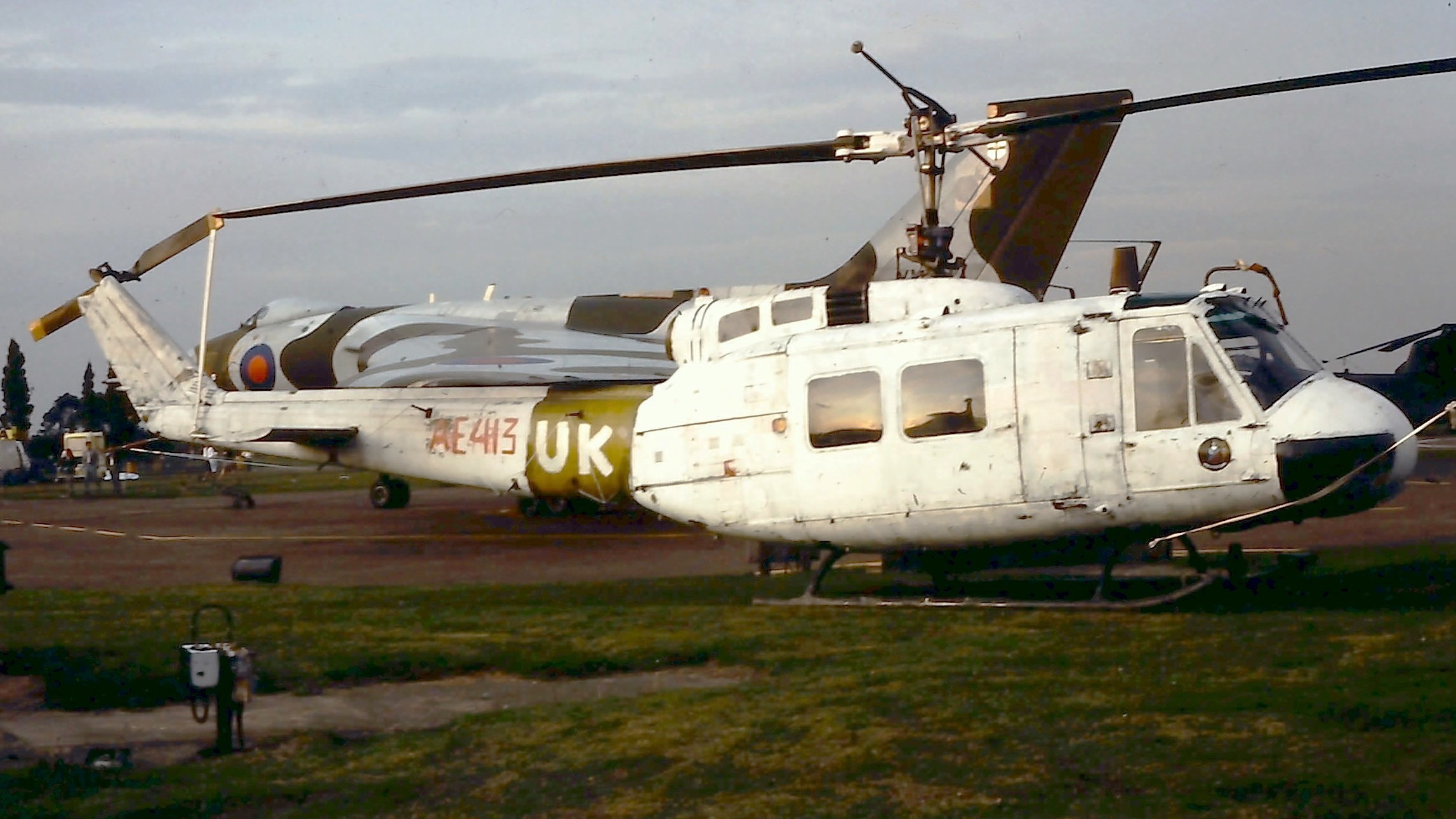
Captured Army UH-1 was used by the British forces after the Argentine surrender

- Captured after the war
  - 11 FMA IA 58 Pucará
  - 2 Agusta A109 Army
  - 7 Bell UH-1H Iroquois Army
  - 1 Boeing CH-47C Chinook Army
  - 1 Aérospatiale Puma SA330L Coast Guard
  - 3 Aermacchi MB.339A Navy
  - 2 Bell 212
- Lost with ARA General Belgrano
  - 1 Aérospatiale Alouette AI03 Navy
- Flying accident in the war zone
  - 1 Westland Lynx HAS.Mk.23 Navy — 2 May, hit ARA Santísima Trinidad
  - 2 FMA IA 58 Pucará — 28 May, hit ground, recovered in 1986, 24 May. (Note: According to www.naval-history.net/F64argaircraftlost.htm a Pucará was lost over the Atlantic on a reconnaissance mission from Comodoro Rivadavia)
  - 1 Aermacchi MB.339A Navy — 3 May, bad weather crash
  - 2 (Note: SN: C-303 and C-313) McDonnell Douglas A-4C Skyhawk — 9 May, South Jason Island

Total lost by other causes: 55.

- Total aircraft losses

75 fixed-wing aircraft and 25 helicopters.

== See also ==
- Falklands War order of battle: Argentine ground forces
- Falklands War order of battle: Argentine naval forces
- Falklands War order of battle: British air forces
- Pablo Carballo
- Pebble Island raid
- Roberto Curilovic
