= Commander-in-Chief of the Air Force =

Commander-in-Chief of the Air Force may refer to:

- Commander-in-Chief of the Argentine Air Force
- Commander-in-Chief of the Chilean Air Force
- Commander-in-Chief of the Indian Air Force
- Commander-in-Chief of the Pakistan Air Force
- Commander-in-Chief of the Russian Air Force
- Commander-in-Chief of the Royal Thai Air Force
