= South Air Force =

Former Argentine Air Force command

- Fuerza Aérea Sur
- Active: 1982
- Disbanded: 1982
- Country: Argentina
- Branch: Air Force
- Type: Aviation
- Part of: Strategic Air Command
- Garrison/HQ: Comodoro Rivadavia
- Engagements: Falklands War, battle of San Carlos, bombing of mount Kent, Bluff Cove air attacks

Commanders
- Notable commanders: Ernesto Crespo

Aircraft flown
- Attack: A-4P Skyhawk, A-4C Skyhawk, FMA IA-58 Pucará
- Bomber: Canberra MK-62
- Fighter: IAI Dagger
- Interceptor: Mirage IIIEA
- Transport: C-130H Hercules
- Tanker: KC-130H Hercules

The South Air Force was a military unit of the Argentine Air Force that controlled air units during the Falklands War.

The Strategic Air Command created the South Air Force to command the military air operations in south of Argentina. The chief of the IV Air Brigade, brigadier Ernesto Crespo, assumed as commander of the South Air Force.

The responsibility of the FAS included strategic, tactical and transport air operations at the South Operations Theatre and the South Atlantic Operations Theater.

The Malvinas Joint Command depended almost entirely on the logistic support of the South Air Force.

The operations were initiated on 1 May 1982.
