= Teodoro Waldner =

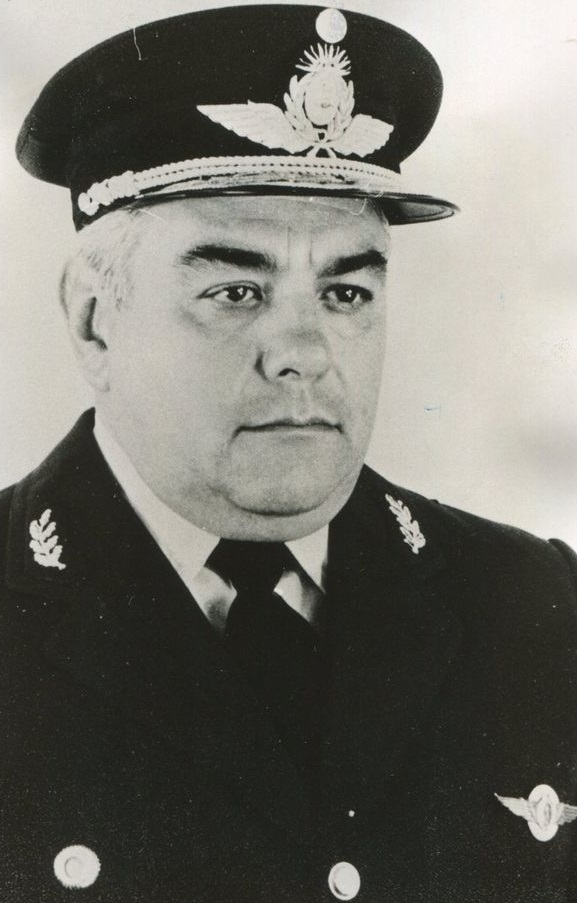

Chief of the Joint Chiefs of Staff of the Armed Forces of the Argentine Republic
- In office 8 March 1985 – 11 July 1989
- Preceded by: Julio Fernández Torres
- Succeeded by: Emilio Osses

Chief of the General Staff of the Argentine Air Force
- In office 14 December 1983 – 5 March 1985
- Preceded by: Augusto Hughes
- Succeeded by: Ernesto Horacio Crespo

Personal details
- Born: 4 January 1927 Córdoba Province, Argentina
- Died: 13 April 2014 (aged 86) Buenos Aires, Argentina

Military service
- Allegiance: Argentina
- Branch/service: Argentine Air Force
- Years of service: 1948–1989
- Rank: Brigadier general

Teodoro Guillermo Waldner (4 January 1927 – 13 April 2014) was an Argentine General that served as the Chief of the Joint Chiefs of Staff of the Armed Forces of the Argentine Republic. He also served as the Chief of the General Staff of the Argentine Air Force

According to the Argentine newspaper El Diario, during the Falklands War, Waldner led a mission to Libya and brought back weapons and missiles from Gaddafi's regime. After the war, in 1983 Waldner became the first head of the Air Force since the return of democracy to Argentina and was styled as a chief of staff as opposed to a commander-in-chief. In 1985, Waldner was appointed as Chief of Joint Staff of the Armed Forces, a position he held until his retirement in 1989.
