= Galtieri =

Galtieri is an Italian surname. Notable people with the surname include:

- Francesco Galtieri, songwriter for multinational crossover vocal group Il Divo
- Lina Galtieri (born 1934), Italian-American physicist
- Leopoldo Galtieri (1926–2003), Argentine general and military dictator
