= Ernesto Horacio Crespo =

Argentine Brigadier General (1929–2019)

Chief of Staff of the Air Force
- In office 1985–1989
- President: Raúl Alfonsín
- Preceded by: Teodoro Waldner
- Succeeded by: José Julia

Personal details
- Born: 8 December 1929
- Died: 9 March 2019 (aged 89)
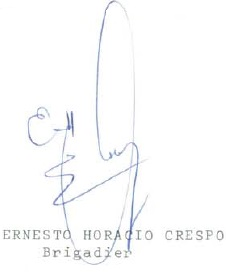
- Signature

Military service
- Allegiance: Argentina
- Branch/service: Argentine Air Force
- Rank: Argentine Brigadier General (Lieutenant General)
- Commands: South Air Force; 4th Air Force Brigade
- Battles/wars: Falklands War; Operation Sutton; Battle of San Carlos; Bluff Cove Air Attacks; Carapintadas conflict

Ernesto Horacio Crespo (8 December 1929 – 6 March 2019) was an Argentine Brigadier General (Lieutenant General) and former Chief of Staff of the Argentine Air Force.

== Early life ==
In 1982, Crespo, who was the commander of the Fourth Air Force Brigade at the time, was tasked with creating, deploying, and commanding the South Air Force (Spanish: Fuerza Aérea Sur). This military organization coordinated both Air Force and Argentine Navy air units during the Falklands War, playing a crucial role in the conflict.

From 1985 to 1989, Crespo served as Chief of Staff of the Argentine Air Force under President Raúl Alfonsín. During the Carapintadas conflict within the Argentine Army, Crespo's leadership was instrumental in maintaining the Air Force's support for the democratic government.

During his tenure, the Condor Program, a missile development initiative, was publicly revealed. The program was later discontinued in the early 1990s under President Carlos Menem due to political pressure from the United States.

== Death ==
Ernesto Horacio Crespo died on 6 March 2019. His death marked the end of a distinguished career in the Argentine military, remembered for his strategic acumen and commitment to national defense.

== See also ==
- Argentine air forces in the Falklands War

Military offices
Preceded by Teodoro Waldner	Chief of the General Staff of the Argentine Air Force; 1985–1989	Succeeded by José A. Julia
