= List of chiefs of the general staff of the Argentine Air Force =

Chief of the General Staff of the Argentine Air Force
- Jefe del Estado Mayor General de la Fuerza Aérea Argentina
- Seal of the Argentine Air Force

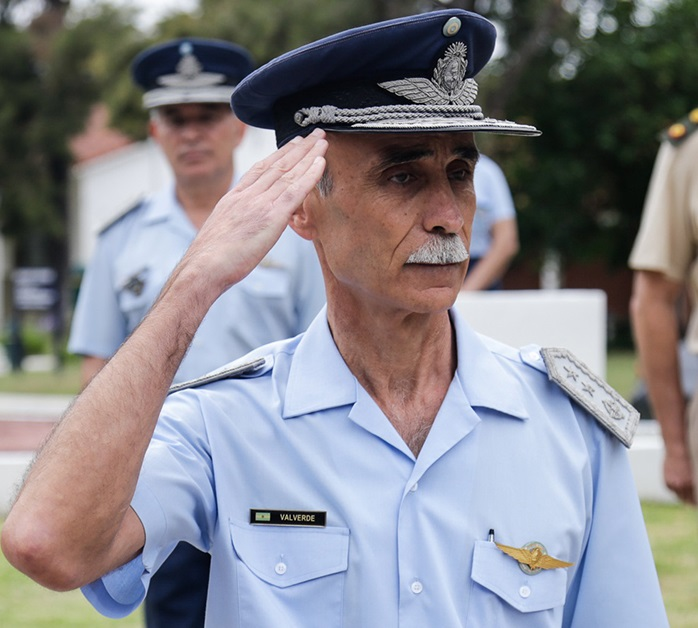
- Incumbent; Brigadier General Gustavo Valverde since 26 November 2024
- Argentine Air Force
- Reports to: Chief of the Joint Chiefs of Staff
- Appointer: President of Argentina
- Formation: 9 February 1945
- First holder: Edmundo Sustaita

This article lists the chiefs of the General Staff of the Argentine Air Force and their preceding offices, between 1945 and the present day. The Argentine Air Force (Spanish: Fuerza Aérea Argentina) is the air force of Argentina. By law, the chief of the Argentine Air Force must be an active pilot.

The current Chief of the Air Force General Staff is Brigadier General Gustavo Valverde. He was appointed by President Javier Milei on 26 November 2024.

== List ==
No.	Portrait	Name (Birth–Death)	Term		
No.	Portrait	Name (Birth–Death)	Took office	Left office	Time in office
Commander of the Air Force (Comandante de la Fuerza Aérea)
1	Edmundo Sustaita [es]	Brigadier; Edmundo Sustaita (1898–1955)	9 February 1945	3 November 1945	267 days
2	Oscar Muratorio [es]	Brigadier General; Oscar Muratorio (1900–1977)	3 November 1945	10 November 1945	7 days
3	Pedro Castex Lainfor [es]	Brigadier; Pedro Castex Lainfor (1898–1969)	10 November 1945	19 July 1946	251 days
Commander-in-Chief of the Air Force (Comandante en jefe de la Fuerza Aérea)
(2)	Oscar Muratorio [es]	Brigadier General; Oscar Muratorio (1900–1977)	19 July 1946	4 October 1951	5 years, 77 days
4	Gustavo Hermansson [es]	Brigadier General; Gustavo Hermansson (1905–1970)	4 October 1951	17 January 1952	105 days
5	Carlos Mauriño [es]	Brigadier General; Carlos Mauriño (1906–1974)	17 January 1952	20 January 1955	3 years, 3 days
6	Juan Fabri [es]	Brigadier General; Juan Fabri (1909–2008)	20 January 1955	19 September 1955	242 days
(4)	Gustavo Hermansson [es]	Brigadier General; Gustavo Hermansson (1905–1970)	19 September 1955	13 January 1956	116 days
7	Heriberto Ahrens [es]	Brigadier General; Heriberto Ahrens (1908–1994)	13 January 1956	3 January 1957	356 days
8	Guillermo Zinny [es]	Brigadier General; Guillermo Zinny (1906–1979)	3 January 1957	17 May 1957	134 days
9	Ángel Peluffo [es]	Brigadier General; Ángel Peluffo (1909–1988)	17 May 1957	7 August 1957	82 days
10	Alfredo Vedoya [es]	Brigadier General; Alfredo Vedoya (1913–1992)	7 August 1957	7 May 1958	273 days
11	Miguel Moragues [es]	Brigadier; Miguel Moragues (1918–2003)	7 May 1958	2 September 1958	118 days
12	Manuel Alemán [es]	Brigadier General; Manuel Alemán (1910–1990)	24 September 1958	31 December 1960	2 years, 98 days
13	Cayo Alsina [es]	Brigadier General; Cayo Alsina (1914–2009)	31 December 1960	11 December 1962	1 year, 345 days
14	Carlos Armanini [es]	Brigadier General; Carlos Armanini (1918–2015)	11 December 1962	27 May 1966	3 years, 167 days
15	Adolfo Álvarez [es]	Brigadier General; Adolfo Álvarez (1919–2012)	27 May 1966	28 August 1968	2 years, 93 days
16	Jorge Martínez Zuviría [es]	Brigadier General; Jorge Martínez Zuviría (1920–2001)	28 August 1968	12 March 1970	1 year, 196 days
17	Carlos Alberto Rey [es]	Brigadier General; Carlos Alberto Rey (1922–2017)	12 March 1970	25 May 1973	3 years, 74 days
General Commander of the Air Force (Comandante general de la Fuerza Aérea)
18	Hector Fautario	Brigadier General; Hector Fautario (1924–2017)	25 May 1973	18 December 1975	2 years, 207 days
Commander-in-Chief of the Air Force (Comandante en jefe de la Fuerza Aérea)
19	Orlando Ramón Agosti	Brigadier General; Orlando Ramón Agosti (1924–1997)	18 December 1975	25 January 1979	3 years, 38 days
20	Omar Graffigna	Brigadier General; Omar Graffigna (1926–2019)	25 January 1979	17 December 1981	2 years, 326 days
21	Basilio Lami Dozo	Brigadier General; Basilio Lami Dozo (1929–2017)	17 December 1981	17 August 1982	243 days
22	Augusto Hughes	Brigadier General; Augusto Hughes (1931–1993)	17 August 1982	14 December 1983	1 year, 119 days
Chief of the General Staff of the Air Force (Jefe del Estado Mayor General de la Fuerza Aérea)
23	Teodoro Waldner	Brigadier General; Teodoro Waldner (1927–2014)	14 December 1983	5 March 1985	1 year, 81 days
24	Ernesto Horacio Crespo	Brigadier General; Ernesto Horacio Crespo (1929–2019)	5 March 1985	11 July 1989	4 years, 128 days
25	José Juliá [es]	Brigadier General; José Juliá (1934–2005)	11 July 1989	14 July 1993	4 years, 3 days
26	Juan Paulik [es]	Brigadier General; Juan Paulik (born 1940)	14 July 1993	23 October 1996	3 years, 101 days
27	Rubén Montenegro [es]	Brigadier General; Rubén Montenegro (born 1942)	23 October 1996	13 December 1999	3 years, 51 days
28	Walter Barbero [es]	Brigadier General; Walter Barbero (born 1942)	13 December 1999	4 June 2003	3 years, 173 days
29	Carlos Rohde [es]	Brigadier General; Carlos Rohde (born 1947)	4 June 2003	17 February 2005	1 year, 258 days
30	Eduardo Schiaffino [es]	Brigadier General; Eduardo Schiaffino (born 1951)	17 February 2005	6 November 2006	1 year, 262 days
31	Normando Costantino	Brigadier General; Normando Costantino (born 1952)	8 November 2006	3 July 2013	6 years, 237 days
32	Mario Callejo [es]	Brigadier General; Mario Callejo (born 1951)	3 July 2013	26 January 2016	2 years, 207 days
33	Enrique Amrein [es]	Brigadier General; Enrique Amrein (born 1959)	26 January 2016	28 February 2020	4 years, 33 days
34	Xavier Isaac	Brigadier General; Xavier Isaac (born 1962)	28 February 2020	2 January 2024	3 years, 308 days
35	Fernando Luis Mengo [es]	Brigadier General; Fernando Luis Mengo (born 1965)	2 January 2024	26 November 2024	329 days
36	Gustavo Valverde [es]	Brigadier General; Gustavo Valverde (born 1967)	26 November 2024	Incumbent	1 year, 343 days

== See also ==
- Argentine Armed Forces
- Chief of the Joint Chiefs of Staff (Argentina)
- Chief of the General Staff of the Argentine Army
- Chief of the General Staff of the Argentine Navy
