= HMS Ardent (F184) =

1977 British frigate

Coordinates: 51°39′38″S 59°8′12″W

- HMS Ardent

History

United Kingdom
- Name: HMS Ardent
- Operator: Royal Navy
- Ordered: 17 April 1973
- Builder: Yarrow Shipbuilders
- Laid down: 26 February 1974
- Launched: 9 May 1975
- Commissioned: 13 October 1977
- Home port: HMNB Devonport
- Identification: Pennant number: F184
- Motto: Through fire and water
- Fate: Sunk by Argentine aircraft on 22 May 1982

General characteristics
- Class & type: Type 21 frigate
- Displacement: 3,250 tons full load
- Length: 384 ft (117 m)
- Beam: 41 ft 9 in (12.73 m)
- Draught: 19 ft 6 in (5.94 m)
- Propulsion: COGOG: 2 × Rolls-Royce Olympus gas turbines; 2 × Rolls-Royce Tyne RM1A gas turbines for cruising
- Speed: 32 knots (59 km/h; 37 mph)
- Range: 4,000 nautical miles at 17 knots (7,400 km at 31 km/h); 1,200 nautical miles at 30 knots (2,220 km at 56 km/h)
- Complement: 177
- Armament: 1 × 4.5-inch (114 mm) Mark 8 naval gun; 2 × Oerlikon 20 mm cannon; 4 × MM38 Exocet missiles; 1 × quadruple Sea Cat SAMs; 2 × triple ASW torpedo tubes; 2 × Corvus chaff launchers; 1 × Type 182 towed decoy
- Aircraft carried: 1 × Westland Wasp helicopter, later refitted for 1 × Lynx

HMS Ardent was a Royal Navy Type 21 frigate. Built by Yarrow Shipbuilders Ltd, Glasgow, Scotland. She was completed with Exocet launchers in "B" position. Ardent took part in the Falklands War, and was sunk by Argentine aircraft in the Falkland Sound on 21 May 1982.

== Falklands War ==
On 19 April 1982 Ardent sailed from HMNB Devonport near Plymouth for the Falkland Islands. En route, she escorted task force ships that had left late, on their way to Ascension Island, arriving on 3 May and sailing on the morning of 7 May. On 9 May 1982 while 700 miles south west of Ascension, Ardent closed to within 200 yards of the starboard side of the troopship Canberra and provided a gun power demonstration to the troops sailing south.

On 21 May 1982, whilst lying in Falkland Sound and supporting Operation Sutton by bombarding the Argentine airstrip at Goose Green, Ardent was attacked by at least three waves of Argentine aircraft. The air strikes caused Ardent to sink the next day.

=== British account ===
The first attack took place when a A-4 Skyhawk dropped two bombs at 16:00 Z (UTC), which straddled the frigate but both failed to explode.

The bulk of the air strikes began at 17:40 Z. Ardent was ordered to proceed west of North West Island along with Yarmouth to "split air attacks from the south". A group of three aircraft, either Skyhawks or IAI Daggers, crossed the Falklands Sound from the west and then turned to their left to attack from the north east. Cannon fire and three bombs struck home as the Argentine aircraft pressed their attack from the port side. The only defensive weapons which reacted properly were the 20 mm AA cannons.

The Sea Cat anti-aircraft missile system failed to track the attackers, who also outmanoeuvred the 4.5" gun by carrying out their run out of its arc of fire. Two bombs exploded in the hangar area, destroying the Westland Lynx helicopter and blowing the Sea Cat launcher 80 ft (24 m) into the air before it crashed back down onto the flight deck, and the third crashed through the aft auxiliary machinery room but failed to explode. The aft switchboard was severely damaged, causing loss of power for some key assets, such as the main gun. The hangar was left in flames, and the crew suffered a number of casualties.

Still in full control of her engines and steering, but virtually defenceless, Ardent was told to head north, toward Port San Carlos. But at 18:00 Z five Skyhawks approached the frigate and dropped numerous free-fall and retard bombs. A pattern of two to four bombs exploded in the port quarter (aft), while an undetermined number of others which failed to explode penetrated into the ship. Some of the remaining bombs exploded in the water nearby, battering the ship and causing minor flooding in the forward auxiliary machine room.

With the Sea Cat anti‑air missile launcher destroyed, Lieutenant Commander John Murray Sephton RN, Ardent’s Lynx helicopter Flight Commander, organised a last‑ditch defence using small arms. In the final attack (around 15:00) Sephton was seen standing on the exposed flight deck firing his Sterling submachine gun straight up at an incoming A‑4 Skyhawk. The aircraft bombs struck Ardent’s flight deck and killed Sephton and three of his team. For his actions, described in the official citation as “extreme valour and self‑sacrifice”, Sephton was posthumously awarded the Distinguished Service Cross.

The dining hall was shattered, communications between the bridge and the ship control centre were cut off, and the frigate lost steering. This attack caused many casualties, especially among the damage-control teams working in the hangar.

Ardent stopped in the shallow waters of Grantham Sound, the fires in her stern now out of control. With the ship listing heavily, Commander Alan West gave the order to abandon the ship. Yarmouth came alongside to take off survivors, and the crew was transferred to Canberra. At that time it was known that 22 men were killed. Ardent continued to burn throughout the night, accompanied by the occasional explosion, until she sank at 6:30 the next day, with only her skewed radar antenna on the foremast remaining above the water.

Able Seaman John Dillon was able to remove an injured sailor from the debris and, despite his own burns, got the man topside and into the water where they were both rescued. For his heroism he received a George Medal, one of three awarded for the war.

The last man to leave was her captain, Commander Alan West, who was subsequently awarded the Distinguished Service Cross, and served as First Sea Lord from 2002–2006.

Within days naval divers removed her light AA guns for fitting to other ships and her foremast was used as a navigational warning and datum by her sister ship Arrow whilst she bombarded Goose Green.

The wreck is designated as a prohibited area under the Falkland Islands Protection of Wrecks Act.

=== Argentine account ===
==== Air Force attacks ====
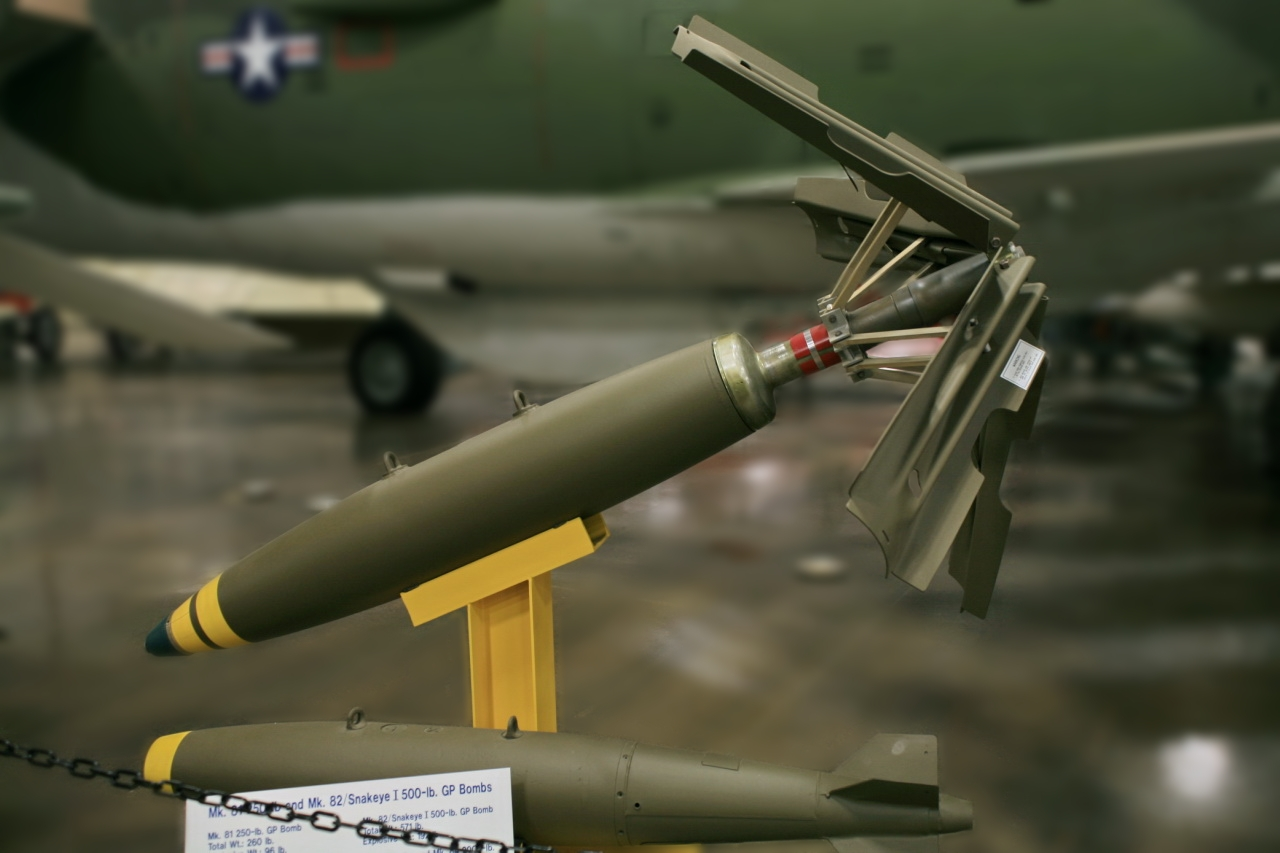
Mk. 82 bomb with tail retarding device, used by the Argentine Navy A4Qs in the attack on Ardent

According to the Argentine Air Force official website Ardent was the subject of two attacks from FAA aircraft:

- 14:00 Argentine time (UTC-3) by a lone A-4B Skyhawk of 5th Air Group. Four A-4B took off from Rio Gallegos at 11:30 UTC-3. After experiencing problems during the air-to-air refuelling, two aircraft were forced to abort and fly back to their base. Once over the Falklands Sound, the remainder Skyhawks chanced upon an unidentified transport ship – she was apparently the abandoned Argentine cargo vessel Río Carcaraña – which was attacked by one of the jets. The other fighter, piloted by the flight commander, Captain Pablo Carballo, dropped one 1,000 lb (450 kg) dumb bomb on a frigate he found at Grantham Sound. He reported heavy anti-aircraft fire but returned safely. The bomb exploded on the stern. Carballo went on to attack Broadsword a few days later.
- 14:40 UTC-3 by IAI Daggers of 6th Air Group. A flight of two Daggers, led by Captain Mir González, was joined by a third Dagger returning from an aborted sortie. They headed together towards San Carlos, but were intercepted by a patrol of Sea Harriers vectored by Brilliant, and the attached aircraft was shot down over West Falkland. The pilot ejected and was recovered later. The two original Daggers successfully outran the British air patrol and entered Falklands Sound from the south. They discovered a frigate and dropped two 1,000 lb (450 kg) bombs on her stern. They also hit the vessel with their 30 mm cannon. According to this report, the warship responded to the attack by firing anti-aircraft missiles.

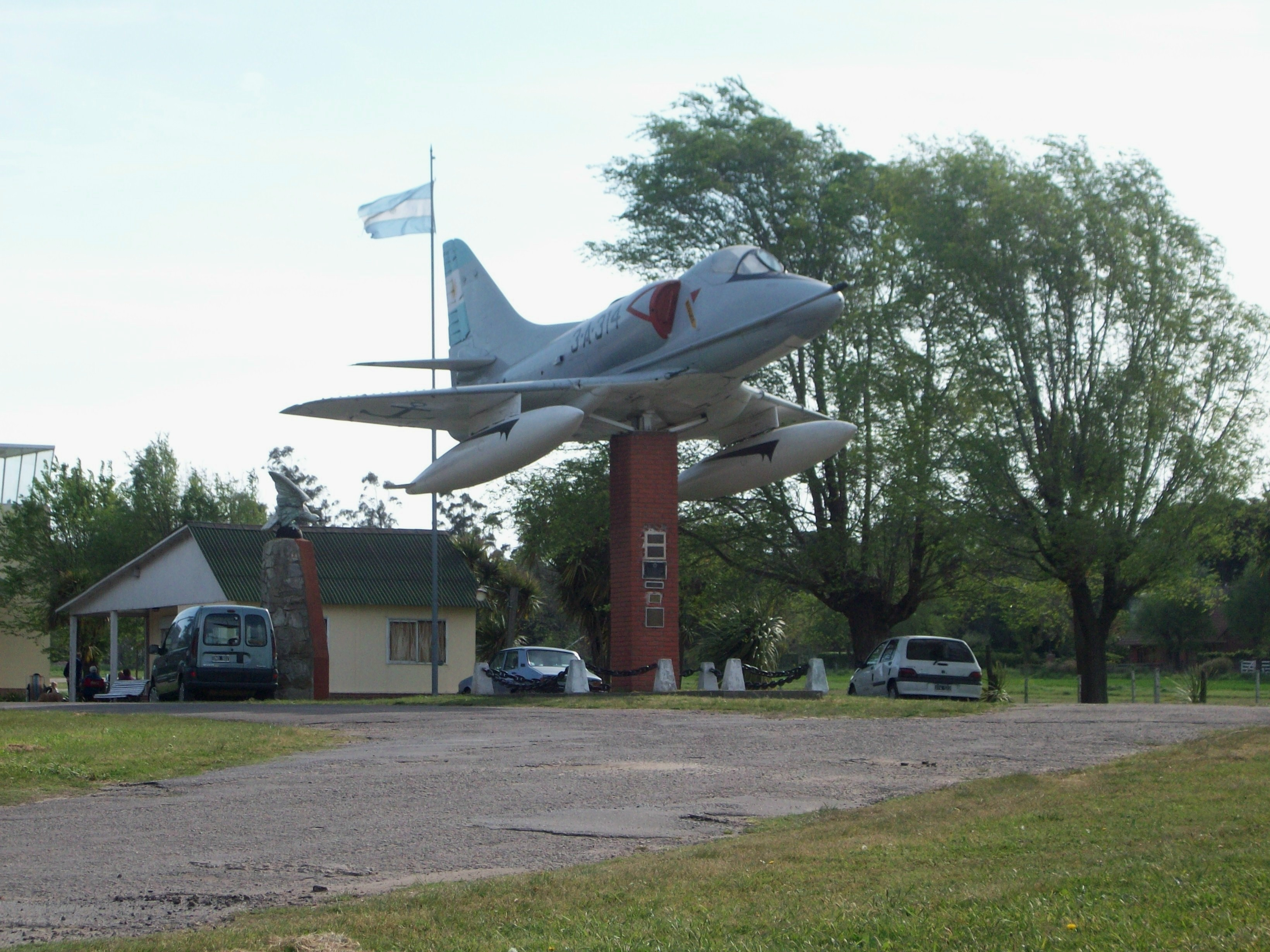
Gate guardian painted in the colours of 3-A-314, the last A-4Q to attack Ardent at the entrance of Air Club Mar del Plata. The pilot, Lt. Gustavo Marcelo Márquez, killed in action, had been born in this city and was a member of that club.

==== Navy aircraft sortie ====
- 15:01 UTC-3 three Argentine Navy A-4Q Skyhawks of 3rd Fighter and Attack Naval Sqd. hit Ardent with at least two bombs on the stern, a number of unexploded bombs which ripped into the hull, and several near-misses. This squadron usually operated off the carrier ARA Veinticinco de Mayo, but this mission was carried out from a land base at Rio Grande. Navy aircraft used a dozen 500 lb (230 kg) retarding tail bombs during the attack.

During their escape they were shot down by Sea Harriers. The pilot who made the final run, Lt. Gustavo Marcelo Márquez was killed in action after his A-4Q was hit by 30 mm fire and exploded. Lt. Philippi, shot down by an AIM-9L Sidewinder missile, ejected safely; afterwards being sheltered by local farmer Tony Blake during the night he rejoined Argentine forces. Lt. Arca, with his A-4Q also struck by 30 mm rounds, bailed out safely after an unsuccessful attempt to land at Stanley. The pilot was rescued from the water by the Argentine Army Huey UH-1H of Captain Svendsen. Arca ejected at Cape Pembroke, two miles (3 km) from Stanley airstrip.
