= Juan Lombardo =

Argentine vice admiral (1927–2019)

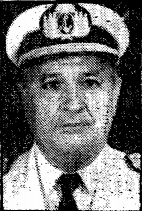
Juan Lombardo

Juan José Lombardo (19 March 1927 – 26 November 2019) was an Argentine vice admiral imprisoned for crimes against humanity. He was the commander-in-chief of the South Atlantic Theatre of Operations during the 1982 Falklands War. He was also the mastermind of the Argentine invasion of the Falklands. Lombardo was born in Salto, Buenos Aires in March 1927.

== Trial ==
In 2010, he was put under house arrest for crimes against humanity committed in Argentina during the National Reorganization Process. He was later one of the 63 accused of such crimes during the dictatorship in a series of trial known as the "ESMA mega-trial".

In February 2016, he received a third sentence of life imprisonment.

He died in November 2019, two weeks after being admitted to the Hospital Naval in Buenos Aires. Lombardo was 92 years old.

== See also ==
- Argentine naval forces in the Falklands War
