= Augusto Hughes =

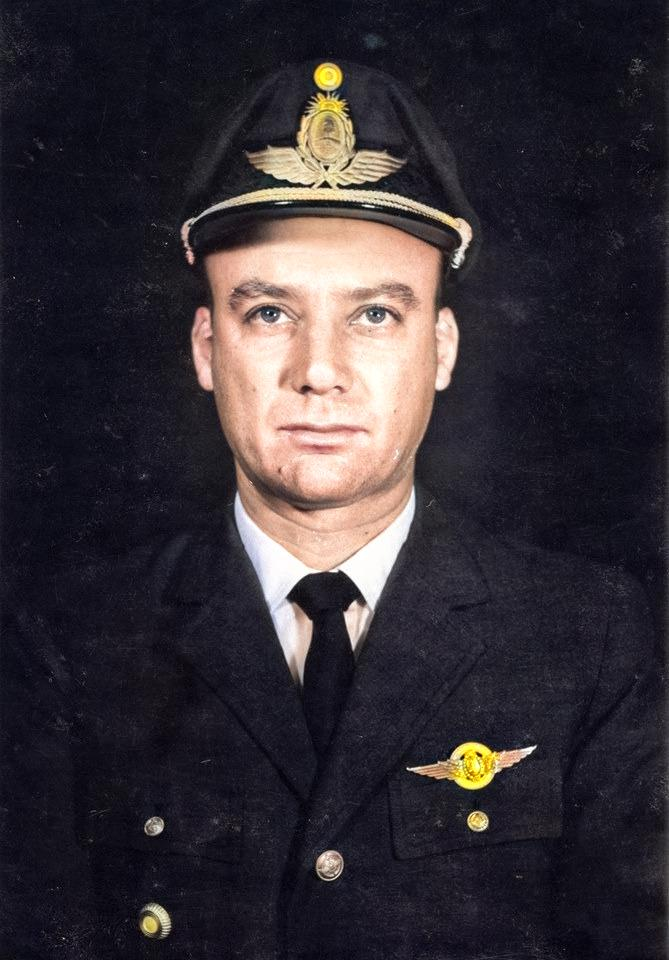
- Hughes in 1976
- Born: 23 August 1931
- Died: 17 January 1993 (aged 61)
- Military career
- Allegiance: Argentina
- Branch: Argentine Air Force
- Rank: Brigadier General (equivalent to 3-star or 4-star rank)

Augusto Jorge Hughes (August 23, 1931 – January 17, 1993) was an Argentine Air Force pilot. He was the second son of the Scottish descendant William Hughes and Josefa Settecase. He was born in Rosario, Santa Fé. A J Hughes entered the Argentine Military Flying School "Escuela de Aviación Militar" in 1948, located in Córdoba. Over his flying career, he flew the British Gloster Meteor aircraft while he was a lieutenant and later on, the American Sabre F 86.

In 1966 he was sent as a captain to the US in order to bring the firsts A4B Skyhawks, which were destined to the 5th Air Brigade "V Brigada Aérea" in Villa Reynolds, San Luis.

By the beginning of the Falklands War in April 1982, he had become a Major Brigadier as the head of the Air Defense Command, organizing the air strike raids against the British Task Force. The Argentine air fleet was mainly composed of American jetplanes Douglas A4B-C Skyhawk, French Mirage, Israeli Dagger and the British bomber Canberra. The navy contributed with French Super Etendart and American A4Q Skyhawks. Argentine Pucará and Italian Aermacchi operated from the local airports of the Falklands Islands.

Hughes also organized the deployment of the anti-aircraft artillery around the two main airfields.

By the end of the war in June 1982, he was pointed by the surviving pilots to become the new Commander-in-Chief of the Argentine Air Force.

In 1983, elections were called and five days before president Alfonsin took power on December 10, he retired and his pilot career came to an end.

Military offices
Preceded by Basilio Lami Dozo	Commander-in-Chief of the Argentine Air Force; 1982–1983	Succeeded by Teodoro Waldner; As Air Force Chief of the General Staff
