= IAI Nesher =

Israel-built version of the Mirage 5 attack aircraft

Nesher
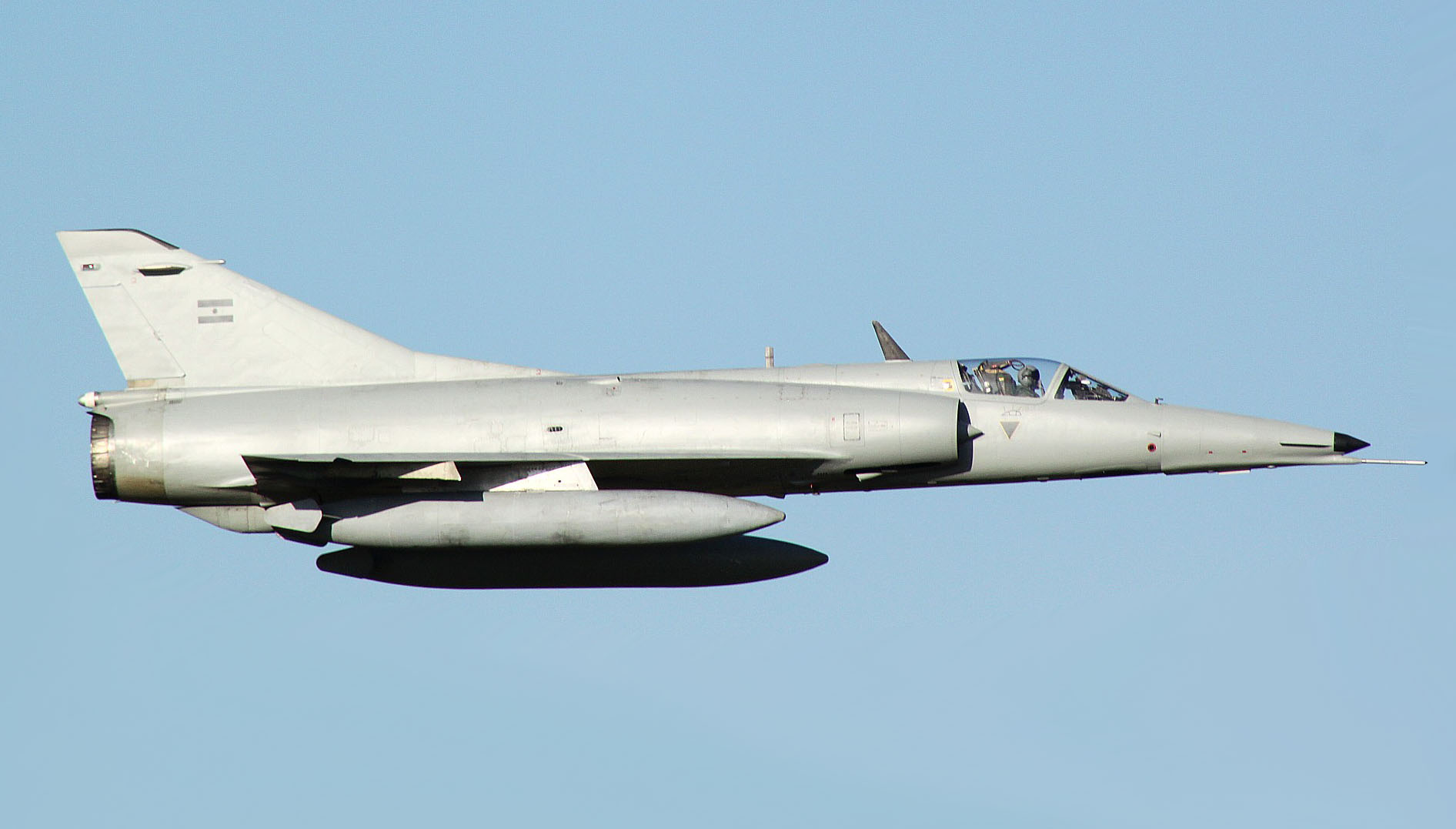
- IAI Finger of the Argentine Air Force at Air Fest 2010

General information
- Type: Multirole fighter
- National origin: France / Israel
- Manufacturer: Israel Aircraft Industries
- Designer: Dassault
- Status: Retired from military service
- Primary users: Israeli Air Force Argentine Air Force
- Number built: 61 (51+10)

History
- Introduction date: 1972
- First flight: September 1971
- Retired: 1977 (Israel); 2015 (Argentina)
- Developed from: Dassault Mirage 5
- Developed into: IAI Kfir

The Israel Aircraft Industries Nesher (Hebrew: נשר, 'griffon vulture', also translated to 'eagle') is the Israeli version of the French Dassault Mirage 5 multirole fighter.

Having sustained moderate aircraft losses during the Six-Day War of 1967 and the War of Attrition fought during the late 1960s, the Israeli Air Force (IAF) sought to procure an improved variant of the highly successful Dassault Mirage III fighter aircraft. While a partnership to produce such an aircraft, the Mirage 5, was formed between French manufacturer Dassault Aviation and Israeli aerospace company Israel Aircraft Industries (IAI), during January 1969, in response to the 1968 Israeli raid on Lebanon, the French government announced that it would be imposing an arms embargo on Israel. In response to the embargo, Israel decided to proceed with the venture, but to domestically manufacture the airframes instead.

During 1969, IAI commenced manufacturing work on the plane. According to official accounts, Israel had already obtained a complete set of drawings and detailed information prior to the embargoes. The Neshers' airframe was identical to the Mirage 5, but was refitted with Israeli-built avionics, a Martin-Baker zero-zero ejection seat, and provisions for a wider range of air-to-air missiles (AAMs), including the Israeli Shafrir heat-seeking missile. During September 1969, the first Nesher prototype performed its maiden flight. During May 1971, the first Raam A was delivered to the IAF. During November 1971, the aircraft was officially renamed as the Nesher. The high point of the Nesher's career with the IAF was during the 1973 Yom Kippur War. The Nesher reportedly performed well during the conflict, as IAF pilots flying it cumulatively claimed over a hundred kills.

During 1974, production of the Nesher was phased out in favour of a more advanced Mirage derivative which had been planned in parallel to the Nesher, known as the IAI Kfir. The IAF retired the Nesher during the 1970s. The aircraft were later sold to the Argentine Air Force, where they were operated under the name Dagger. During 1978, Argentina urgently deployed their first Daggers due to the Beagle conflict, a territorial dispute and war scare between Argentina and neighbouring Chile. Daggers were also used during the 1982 Falklands War between Argentina and the United Kingdom, conducting a total of 153 sorties against both ground and naval targets across the 45 days of combat operations. During their anti-ship attacks, they were reportedly responsible for damaging several vessels, including HMS Antrim, Brilliant, Broadsword, Ardent, Arrow and Plymouth. In total, 11 Daggers were lost in combat with the British, including 9 to Royal Navy Sea Harriers. The remaining aircraft were later upgraded into the Finger standard.

== Design and development ==
=== Origins ===
Early in 1962, the Israeli Air Force (IAF) introduced the first of its Dassault Mirage IIICJ fighter aircraft. For the next two decades, it would be used as an air supremacy platform, securing the skies from hostile aircraft and achieving an impressive kill record during its service life. The performance of the Mirage IIICJ was soon regarded as being highly positive, leading to the type being considered as a strong contender for further development. During the late 1960s, the IAF needed to acquire additional aircraft to replace over 60 combat aircraft lost during the Six-Day War of 1967 and the War of Attrition which followed immediately and continued until 1970. In addition, an arms race was emerging between Israel and several of its neighbors, including Syria and Egypt, which were receiving increasingly advanced armaments from the Soviet Union during this time.

Accordingly, during July 1960, Israel had commenced work on a co-development effort with French aircraft manufacturer Dassault Aviation to develop and produce a variant of their highly successful Mirage III fighter aircraft. This product of this programme became known as the Mirage 5 and it was eventually built by Israel and named Raam in Hebrew (thunder). Dassault had pursued the development of the Mirage 5 at the request of the Israelis, who were the main foreign customers of the Mirage III and generally favoured France as a military supplier during this era. Specific requirements established by the IAF for the next version of the fighter was to de-emphasize the aircraft's all-weather capability and remove its main radar system in exchange for improved ordnance-carrying capacity and range; this was made possible by the mostly-clear climate and typical weather conditions present in the Middle East.

Even prior to the prototype's maiden flight, Israel placed an order for a batch of 50 aircraft, as well as a pair of trainer aircraft. However, the program was effectively derailed during January 1969 when, in response to the 1968 Israeli raid on Lebanon, the French government announced that it would be imposing an arms embargo on Israel and the "warring nations of the Middle East". The enactment of the embargo prevented the delivery of the first 30 Mirage 5 aircraft, which were already paid for by Israel, in addition to options for 20 more of the type. In addition to preventing further deliveries, it also cut off all French support for operating the IAF's existing Mirage IIICJ fleet. Strategically, the embargo gave Israel the impetus to develop its own domestic arms industry in order to meet demands.

The embargo has been viewed as having been a considerable setback for the IAF, who wanted to use the new Mirage 5 variant to compensate for the losses incurred during the Six-Day War. The IAF was using the Mirage IIIC, but found itself unable to access official support. In response to the French decision, Israel decided to domestically manufacture the airframes (known as Raam A and B project); reportedly, Israel already possessed the necessary schematics and documentation on the aircraft, although Israel did not officially obtain a manufacturing license from Dassault. According to aviation author Don McCarthy, it has been speculated that Israeli intelligence agency Mossad had played a role in obtaining some of the manufacturing information, while others allege that Dassault's founder, Marcel Dassault, may have freely provided design information.

=== Production ===
According to aviation authors Doug Dildy and Pablo Calcaterra, Dassault discreetly provided the jigs, fixtures, and a large quantity of airframe components to Israel via an industrial consortium of Israeli aerospace company Israel Aircraft Industries and American aviation firm North American Rockwell, who were claimed to have been sold a manufacturing licence in January 1968. Reportedly, the first bare airframes, featuring no weapons, electronics, ejection seat, or engine included, had been delivered directly from Dassault in France. Dildy and Calcaterra claimed that detailed information on the aircraft's Atar engine was obtained via Swiss industrial manufacturer Sulzer, who had produced the engine for Switzerland's own Mirages; between these blueprints and possessing several Atar engines of the IAF's existing Mirages to reverse engineer, Israel was able to independently manufacture its own engines.

During 1969, IAI commenced manufacturing the project. Officially, Israel manufactured the aircraft after having obtained a complete set of drawings. However, some sources have alternatively claimed that Israel had received 50 Mirage 5s in a disassembled state and shipped in crates directly from the French Air Force (AdA), while the AdA proceeded to take on the 50 aircraft which had originally been intended for Israeli service. During September 1969, the first Nesher prototype performed its maiden flight. During May 1971, the first Raam A was delivered to the IAF. During November 1971, the aircraft received its official name of Nesher.

The Neshers' airframe was identical to the Mirage 5, but there was an extensive refitting of Israeli-built avionics systems, along with the adoption of a Martin-Baker zero-zero ejection seat, and improved provisions for a wider range of AAMs, including the Israeli Shafrir heat-seeking missile. In total, 51 Nesher fighters (Nesher S) and ten Nesher two-seat trainers (Nesher T) were constructed by IAI. The Nesher featured more simplistic avionics than the IAF's Mirage IIIC, reportedly, it was also slightly less maneuverable. However, it possessed a longer combat range and a larger payload. The reduced maneuverability of the type did not prevent the Nesher from performing well in air combat during the Yom Kippur War of 1973.

During 1974, production of the Nesher was phased out in favour of a more advanced Mirage derivative that had been planned in parallel to the Nesher. The principal difference of this derivative was the replacement of the Atar engine by an Israeli-built General Electric J79 engine. The J79 was a popular American engine for combat aircraft, having already been used on fighters such as the Lockheed F-104 Starfighter and the McDonnell Douglas F-4 Phantom II. The resulting aircraft was given the name IAI Kfir.

== Operational history ==
=== Israel ===
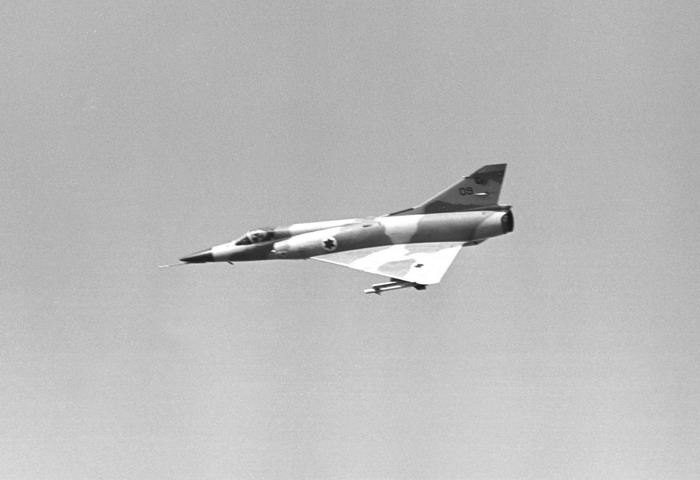
Israeli Nesher over the Golan Heights during the Yom Kippur War

During May 1971, the first Raam A was delivered to the IAF. Production deliveries continued until February 1974, by which point a total of 51 Nesher fighters and 10 Nesher two-seat trainers has been delivered to the IAF.

The high point of the Nesher's career with the IAF occurred during the Yom Kippur War of 1973. The type reportedly performed well during the conflict, IAF pilots flying the type cumulatively claimed over a hundred kills. Shortly after the conflict, the decision was made to retire the Nesher. The introduction of the more capable Kfir derivative had diminished the importance of the Nesher, and their involvement in offensive operations had resulted in the airframes having rapidly aged as well. Following their withdrawal from service with the IAF, the majority of the remaining Neshers were refurbished and sold to Argentina, where the type was known as the Dagger.

=== Argentina ===
Following their retirement from IAF service, the remaining Israeli aircraft were refurbished and exported to the Argentine Air Force in two batches, 26 fighters were delivered in 1978 and 13 more in 1980, with fifty Rafael Shafrir IV air-to-air missiles. In Argentine service, the type was operated under the name Dagger (the English word); at its height, Argentina operated a total of 35 Dagger A single-seat fighters and four Dagger B two-seat trainers. During 1978, the Dagger was used to form a new unit, 6th Air Group; this unit was immediately enlisted with the support of the 8th Air Group (which operated the Mirage IIIEA) and the Peruvian Air Force, who were already an established user of the Mirage 5. The urgency of their initial deployment was a product of the Beagle conflict, a territorial dispute and diplomatic crisis between Argentina and neighbouring Chile during that year.

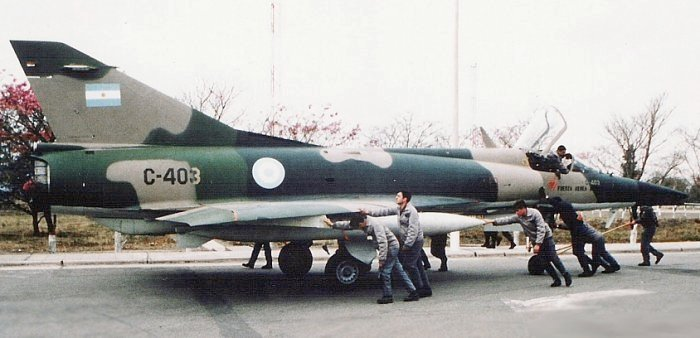
Argentine Air Force Dagger, Jujuy Airport, 1981

During the 1982 Falklands War between Argentina and the United Kingdom, Daggers were deployed to the southern naval airbase of Río Grande, Tierra del Fuego, and an airfield in Puerto San Julián. Despite the lack of an aerial refuelling capability and the considerable distance to their targets the type conducted 153 sorties against both ground and naval targets over the 45 days of combat operations.

They damaged several vessels in anti-ship attacks, including HMS Antrim, Brilliant, Broadsword, and Arrow with cannon fire and Plymouth and Ardent with bombs. Eleven Daggers were lost in combat: nine to AIM-9L Sidewinders fired from Sea Harriers, one by a Sea Wolf from HMS Broadsword, and another to a land-based Rapier.

As part of the 1979 contract with IAI, the Argentine Air Force had stipulated that the Daggers would be equipped with new avionics and HUD systems, enabling them to conform to the Kfir C.2 standard (and beyond in some subsystems). The program, which was named Finger, was already underway in 1982 when the Falklands War broke out. Although the conflict was relatively brief, one consequence of the war was, as some of these systems were made by the British Marconi Electronic Systems, that it became necessary to replace British-built systems after an arms embargo was imposed by the United Kingdom. The work to replace such systems led to the aircraft being modified to the final Finger IIIB standard; this model primarily differed from the original Finger standard in the replacement of British-sourced equipment, often using French-made counterparts from Thomson-CSF.

== Variants ==
- Nesher S: Single-seat ground-attack fighter version for the Israeli Air Force.
- Nesher T: Two-seat training version for the Israeli Air Force.
- Dagger A: Refurbished single-seat fighter version for the Argentine Air Force.
- Dagger B: Refurbished two-seat training version for the Argentine Air Force.

== Operators ==
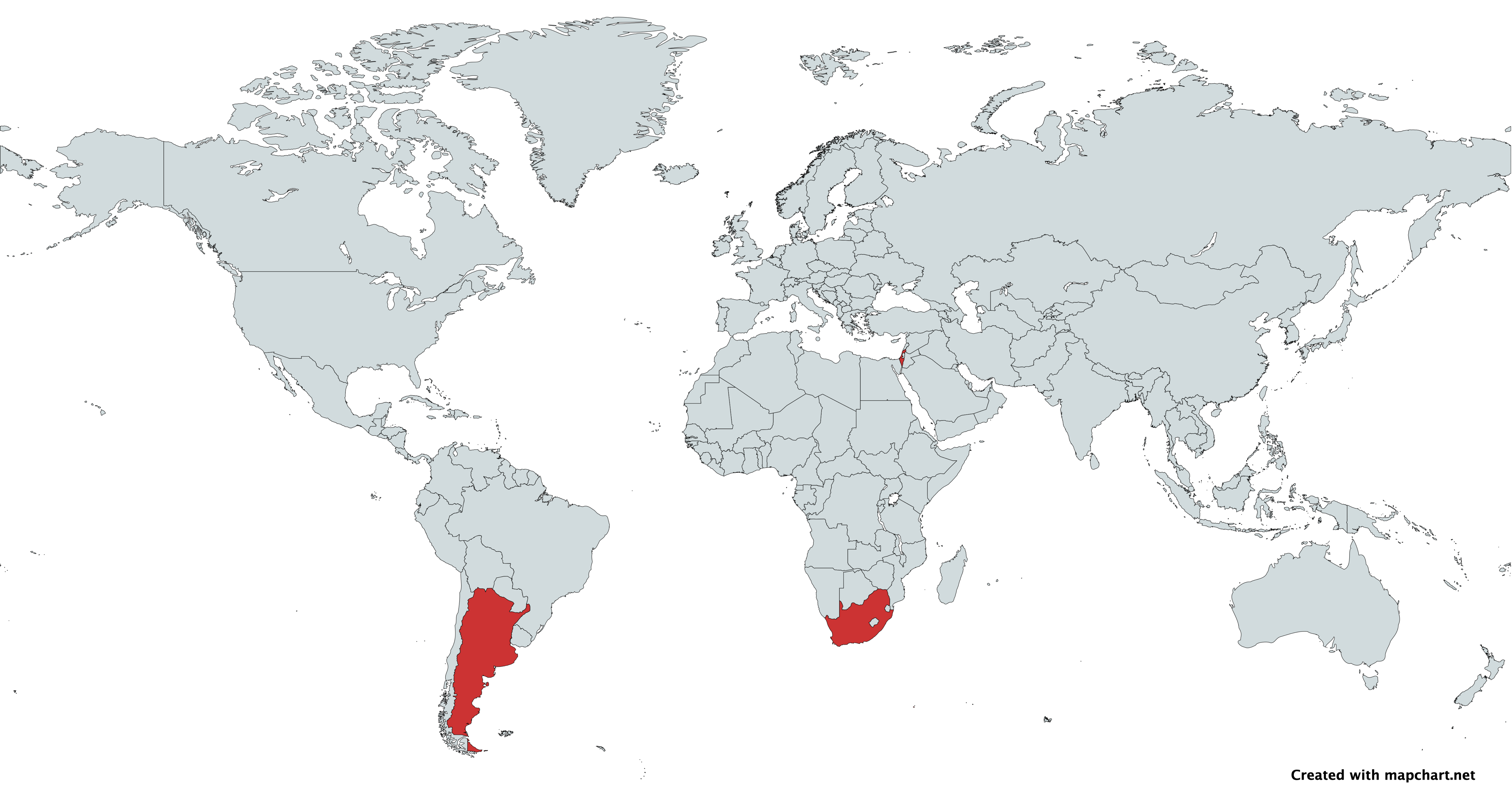
Former operators of the Nesher.

=== Former ===
Argentina

- Argentine Air Force: 39 Daggers received, retired.

Israel

- Israeli Air Force: 61 Retired.

South Africa

- South African Air Force: 5

== Specifications ==
Data from

General characteristics

- Crew: 1
- Length: 15.65 m (51 ft 4 in)
- Wingspan: 8.22 m (27 ft 0 in)
- Height: 4.25 m (13 ft 11 in)
- Wing area: 34.8 m^{2} (375 sq ft)
- Empty weight: 6,600 kg (14,551 lb)
- Max takeoff weight: 13,500 kg (29,762 lb)
- Powerplant: 1 × SNECMA Atar 9C afterburning turbojet engine, 60.89 kN (13,690 lbf) with afterburner

Performanceat 12,000 m (39,370 ft)

- Maximum speed: Mach 2.1
- Range: 1,300 km (810 mi, 700 nmi)
- Combat range: 1,186 km (737 mi, 640 nmi) with 4,700 L (1,200 US gal; 1,000 imp gal) fuel in drop tanks + 2x AAM + 2,600 lb (1,179 kg) of bombs
- Service ceiling: 17,680 m (58,010 ft)
- Rate of climb: 83 m/s (16,300 ft/min)

Armament

- Guns: Two 30mm IAI/DEFA 552 cannon in the fuselage, with 140 rounds each
- Hardpoints: 6 underwing and 1 underfuselage hardpoints with a capacity of 9,259 lb (4,200 kg)
- Missiles: 2 x AIM-9D or Shafrir-2
- Bombs: 12,730lb (5,774 kgs) of ordnance

== See also ==
Related development

- Atlas Cheetah
- Dassault Mirage 5
- IAI Kfir
