= List of replenishment ships of the Royal Fleet Auxiliary =

Ships of the Royal Fleet Auxiliary

Ship names alphabetically
- A; B; C; D; E; F; G; H; I; J; K; L; M; N; O; P; Q; R; S; T; U; V; W; X; Y; Z

Ships by type
- Amphibious warfare ships; Replenishment ships; Miscellaneous ships

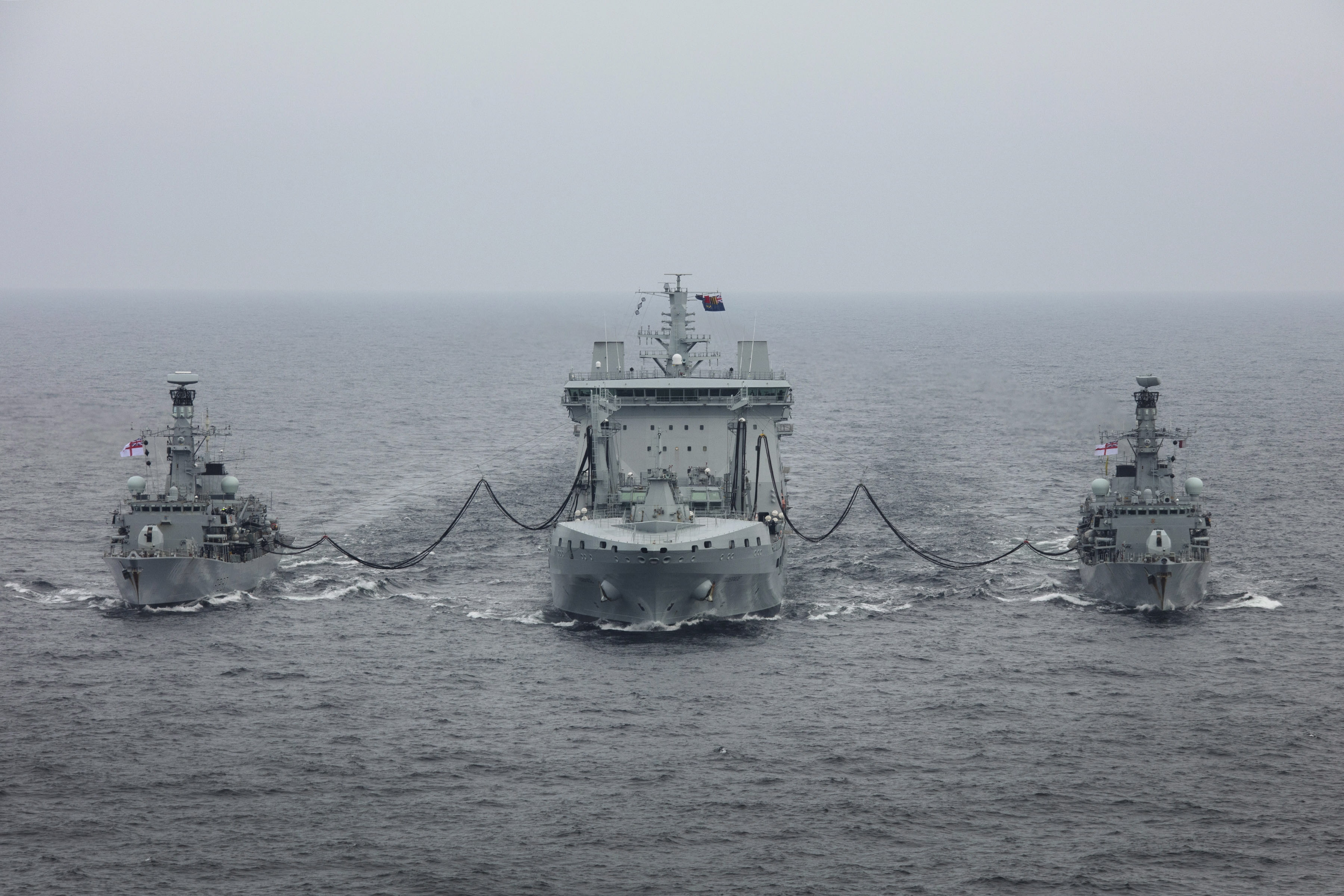
HMS Lancaster (right) conducts a replenishment at sea in the Baltic Region with RFA Tiderace (centre) and HMS Westminster (left)

This is a list of replenishment ships of the Royal Fleet Auxiliary, the naval auxiliary fleet of the United Kingdom.

The list is categorised into two sections: the first section is Active, which comprises the currently operated replenishment ships, while the second section is Decommissioned, including all replenishment ships that were previously in operation.

In the aftermath of the Second World War, the Royal Navy adopted a more efficient pennant number system. In this framework, the letter A was assigned to auxiliaries, referring to vessels that are part of the Royal Fleet Auxiliary.

== Active ==
The Royal Fleet Auxiliary operates four Tide-class fast fleet tankers (Tidespring, Tiderace, Tidesurge and Tideforce) to supply fuel, fresh water, and certain dry stores, alongside the multi-role Fort Victoria-class replenishment oiler (lead ship Fort Victoria) which caters to a broader array of supplies including ammunition and food. These vessels are essential for providing Replenishment at Sea (RAS) to the Royal Navy, NATO, and allied forces, utilising both underway replenishment methods (via rigs) and vertical replenishment techniques (helicopters) (VERTREP). Additionally, a new generation of Fleet Solid Support (FSS) ships, commencing with RFA Resurgent, is currently under construction to enhance this logistical support.

=== Tankers ===
The Tide class are classed as ‘fast tankers’ and can achieve a fully-loaded speed of 15 knots (28 km/h; 17 mph) in sea state 5. These ships are the result of the Military Afloat Reach and Sustainability (MARS) project being part restored due to the need to replace the ageing single hulled-tankers.

List of current tankers of the Royal Fleet Auxiliary
Class / Type	Ship	Pennant No.	Image	In service	Out of service	Service life	Status	Ref.
Tide-class (II) fast fleet tanker	Tideforce	A139		30 July 2019	—	7 years, 74 days	Active	
Tide-class (II) fast fleet tanker	Tidesurge	A138		20 February 2019	—	7 years, 234 days	Active	
Tide-class (II) fast fleet tanker	Tiderace	A137		2 August 2018	—	8 years, 71 days	In extended readiness - uncrewed reserve - as of April 2024; being reactivated as of late 2025	
Tide-class (II) fast fleet tanker	Tidespring	A136		27 November 2017	—	8 years, 319 days	Active	

=== Replenishment ships ===
In November 2018, RFA Fort Victoria completed a refit with the intention to keep her in active service until replaced by one of the new Fleet Solid Support Ships. The modifications to her also included the ability to provide solid stores replenishment to the two Queen Elizabeth-class aircraft carriers.

List of current Replenishment ships of the Royal Fleet Auxiliary
Class / Type	Ship	Pennant No.	Image	In service	Out of service	Service life	Status	Ref.
Fort Victoria-class replenishment oiler	Fort Victoria	A387		24 June 1994	—	32 years, 110 days	In refit for reactivation as of September 2026	

== Decommissioned ==
=== Tankers & oilers ===
- Wave-class fast fleet tanker (2003)
  - Wave Knight
  - Wave Ruler
- Leaf-class support tanker, A. B. Uddevalla type (1981)
  - Oakleaf
- Leaf-class support tanker, Cammell Laird type (1979)
  - Orangeleaf
  - Appleleaf
  - Brambleleaf
  - Bayleaf
- Leaf-class support tanker, Rheinstahl Nordseewerke, Emden type (1973)
  - Cherryleaf
- Rover-class small fleet tanker (1969)
  - Green Rover
  - Blue Rover
  - Grey Rover
  - Gold Rover
  - Black Rover
- Dale-class mobile reserve tanker (1967)
  - Derwentdale
  - Dewdale
  - Ennerdale
- Ol-class large fleet tanker (1965)
  - Olmeda
  - Olna
  - Olwen
- Tide (I)-class fleet replenishment tanker (1963)
  - Tidespring
  - Tidepool
- Leaf-class support tanker, Blythswood Shipbuilding Company type (1960)
  - Pearleaf
- Leaf-class support tanker, Blyth Drydock & Engineering Company type (1960)
  - Plumleaf
- Leaf-class support tanker, Furness Shipbuilding Company type (1959)
  - Bayleaf
  - Brambleleaf
  - Orangeleaf
- Leaf-class support tanker, Bartram type (1959)
  - Appleleaf
- Leaf-class support tanker, Sir James Laing type (1959)
  - Cherryleaf
- Tide (I)-class fleet replenishment tanker (1955)
  - Tidereach
  - Tideflow
  - Tidesurge
  - Tide Austral
- Eddy-class coastal tanker (1953)
  - Eddybeach
  - Eddybay
  - Eddycliff
  - Eddycreek
  - Eddyrock
  - Eddyreef
  - Eddyfirth
  - Eddyness
- Surf-class freighting tanker (1951)
  - Surf Patrol
  - Surf Pioneer
- Ol-class coastal tanker (1946)
  - Birchol
  - Oakol
  - Rowenol
  - Teakol
- Fleet tanker (1946)
  - Olna
- Fast replenishment oiler (1945)
  - Northmark
- Wave-class replenishment oiler (1944)
  - Wave Baron
  - Wave Chief
  - Wave Emperor
  - Wave Governor
  - Wave Liberator
  - Wave Protector
  - Wave Regent
  - Wave Ruler
  - Wave Sovereign
  - Wave Victor
  - Wave King
  - Wave Monarch
  - Wave Duke
  - Wave Knight
  - Wave Laird
  - Wave Prince
  - Wave Protector
  - Wave Master
  - Wave Commander
  - Wave Conqueror
- Ranger-class small fleet tanker (1941)
  - Gold Ranger
  - Gray Ranger
  - Green Ranger
  - Black Ranger
  - Blue Ranger
  - Brown Ranger
- Sprite-class aviation spirits carrier (1941)
  - Airsprite
  - Nasprite
- Dale-class oiler (1940)
  - Dewdale
  - Darkdale
  - Derwentdale
  - Dingledale
  - Dinsdale
  - Denbydale
  - Eaglesdale
  - Easedale
  - Ennerdale
  - Echodale
- Dale-class oiler (1938)
  - Cairndale
  - Cedardale
- Dale-class oiler (1937)
  - Abbeydale
  - Aldersdale
  - Arndale
  - Bishopdale
  - Boardale
  - Broomdale
- Ol-class fleet tanker (1936)
  - Olcades
  - Oligarch
  - Olynthus
  - Olwen
  - Olna
  - Oleander
- War-class fleet oiler (1918)
  - War Afridi
  - War Bahadur
  - War Bharata
  - War Brahmin
  - War Diwan
  - War Gaekwar
  - War Ghurka
  - War Hindoo
  - War Jemadar
  - War Krishna
  - War Mehtar
  - War Nawab
  - War Nizam
  - War Pathan
  - War Pindari
  - War Rajah
  - War Ranee
  - War Sepoy
  - War Shikari
  - War Sirdar
  - War Subadar
  - War Sudra
- Leaf-class tankers (5,000 ton class) (1917)
  - Appleleaf
  - Brambleleaf
  - Cherryleaf
  - Orangeleaf
  - Pearleaf
  - Plumleaf
- Leaf-class tankers (1916)
  - Ashleaf
  - Aspenleaf
  - Bayleaf
  - Beechleaf
  - Birchleaf
  - Boxleaf
  - Briarleaf
  - Laureleaf
  - Limeleaf
  - Mapleleaf
  - Palmleaf
  - Roseleaf
  - Vineleaf
  - Dockleaf
  - Elmleaf
  - Fernleaf
  - Hollyleaf
  - Oakleaf
- Ol-class tankers (1918)
  - Dredgol
- Belgol-class tankers (2000 ton class) (1917)
  - Belgol
  - Celerol
  - Fortol
  - Francol
  - Montenol
  - Prestol
  - Rapidol
  - Serbol
  - Slavol
  - Vitol
- PLA oil barges (ex-Port of London Authority) (1916)
  - Barkol
  - Battersol
  - Blackol
  - Greenol
  - Purfol
  - Silverol
- Creosol-class tankers (1000 ton class) (1916)
  - Birchol
  - Boxol
  - Creosol
  - Distol
  - Ebonol
  - Elderol
  - Elmol
  - Hickorol
  - Kimmerol
  - Larchol
  - Limol
  - Mixol
  - Oakol
  - Palmol
  - Philol
  - Scotol
  - Sprucol
  - Teakol
  - Viscol
- Ol-class tankers (1915)
  - Ferol
- Collier and distilling ship (1915)
  - Hungerford
- Fleet oiler (1915)
  - Nucula
- Fleet oiler (1915)
  - Delphinula
- Fleet oiler (1911)
  - Burma
- Collier (1908)
  - Mercedes
- Collier (tanker after 1907) (1901)
  - Kharki

=== Replenishment ships ===
- Fort Victoria or Fort (II)-class replenishment oiler (1994)
  - Fort George
- Fort Rosalie or Fort (I)-class replenishment ship (1978)
  - Fort Rosalie
  - Fort Austin
- Regent-class armament stores ship (1967)
  - Regent
  - Resource
- Ness class stores support ship (1966)
  - Lyness
  - Stromness
  - Tarbatness
- Hebe-class stores freighter (1962)
  - Hebe
  - Bacchus
- Air Stores Support Ship (1957)
  - Reliant
- Retainer-class armaments/victualling stores issuing ship (1954)
  - Retainer
  - Resurgent
- Fort class stores ship (1944)
  - Fort Beauharnois
  - Fort Charlotte
  - Fort Constantine
  - Fort Dunvegan
  - Fort Duquesne
  - Fort Langley
  - Fort Rosalie
  - Fort Sandusky
- Spa-class coastal water carriers (1942)
  - Spa
  - Spabeck
  - Spabrook
  - Spaburn
  - Spalake
  - Spapool
- Fresh-class water carrier
  - Freshbrook
  - Freshburn
  - Freshener
  - Freshet
  - Freshford
  - Freshlake
  - Freshmere
  - Freshpond
  - Freshpool
  - Freshspray
  - Freshspring
  - Freshtarn
  - Freshwater
  - Freshwell
- Stores Issuing Hulk (1941)
  - Demeter
- Robert Dundas-class coastal store carrier (1938)
  - Robert Dundas
  - Robert Middleton
- Stores Freighter (1936)
  - Bacchus
- Distilling Ship / Stores Ship (1915)
  - Bacchus
- Armament Stores Carrier (1902)
  - Bison

== See also ==
- Fleet solid support ship
- Fleet Solid Support Ship Programme
- Combat stores ship
- Replenishment oiler
