= RFA Cherryleaf =

Three ships of the Royal Fleet Auxiliary have borne the name RFA Cherryleaf:

- RFA Cherryleaf (1917) was a Leaf-class tanker launched in 1916 as RFA Persol, renamed RFA Cherryleaf in 1917 and sold in 1947.
- RFA Cherryleaf (1959) was a Leaf-class tanker launched in 1953 as Laurelwood. She was purchased by the RFA in 1959 and returned to her owners in 1966.
- RFA Cherryleaf (A82) was a Leaf-class tanker launched in 1962 as Overseas Adventurer for a subsidiary of London & Overseas Freighters. She was bareboat chartered for the RFA in 1973 and returned to her owners in 1980.
