= RFA Orangeleaf =

Three ships of the Royal Fleet Auxiliary have borne the name RFA Orangeleaf:

- RFA Orangeleaf (1917) was a Leaf-class tanker launched in 1916 in RFA Bornol, renamed RFA Orangeleaf in 1917 and sold in 1947.
- RFA Orangeleaf (A80) was a Leaf-class tanker launched in 1955 as Southern Satellite. She was purchased by the RFA in 1959 and broken up in 1978.
- RFA Orangeleaf (A110) was a Leaf-class tanker launched in 1975 as Hudson Progress, and later renamed Balder London. She was acquired in 1984 and was decommissioned in September 2015.
