= RFA Oakleaf (A111) =

Leaf-class support tanker of the Royal Fleet Auxiliary

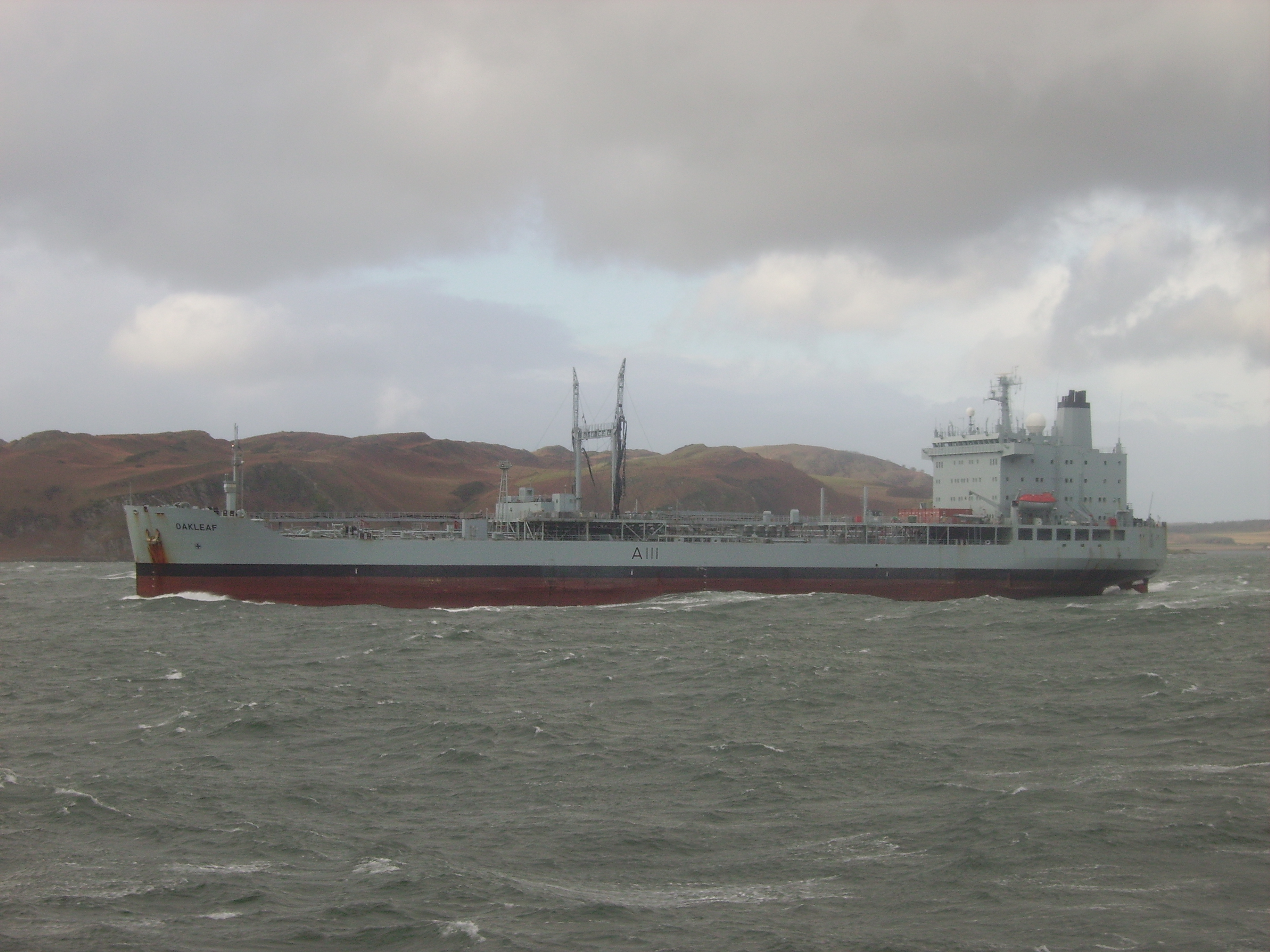
- RFA Oakleaf (A111)

History

United Kingdom
- Name: RFA Oakleaf
- Builder: A. B. Uddevalla, Sweden
- Launched: 2 July 1981
- Acquired: June 1985
- In service: 14 August 1986
- Out of service: 15 June 2007
- Home port: Barrow-in-Furness
- Identification: IMO number: 7915814; Pennant number: A111
- Fate: Scrapped 31 January 2011

General characteristics
- Class & type: Leaf-class tanker
- Tonnage: 24,608 GRT; 14,934 NRT; 34,800 DWT
- Displacement: 49,377 t (48,597 long tons)
- Length: 173.7 m (569 ft 11 in)
- Beam: 32.2 m (105 ft 8 in)
- Draught: 10.2 m (33 ft 6 in)
- Depth: 14.9 m (48 ft 11 in)
- Installed power: 12,250 hp (9,135 kW)
- Propulsion: 1 × 4-cylinder Burmeister & Wain long stroke oil engine; one shaft
- Speed: 14.5 knots (16.7 mph; 26.9 km/h)
- Complement: 36
- Armament: 2 × 7.62 mm general-purpose machine gun (GPMG)

RFA Oakleaf (A111) was a Leaf-class fleet support tanker of the Royal Fleet Auxiliary (RFA), the naval auxiliary fleet of the United Kingdom. Formerly the Swedish vessel MV Oktania, built by A. B. Uddevalla, Sweden, and completed in 1981, Oakleaf was added to the Royal Fleet Auxiliary in 1986, before being decommissioned in 2007.

She was the second Royal Fleet Auxiliary vessel to bear the name.

== Role ==
As well as their role of replenishing warships at sea, support tankers perform the bulk movement of fuels between Ministry of Defense (Navy) depots. The Oakleaf had three Leaf-class sisters - Brambleleaf, Bayleaf and Orangeleaf. All four were originally designed as commercial tankers and underwent major conversions to bring them up to Royal Fleet Auxiliary standards and equip them for naval support. These involved adding a considerable amount of electronics, both in communications and navigational aids, fitting two replenishment rigs and increasing the amount of accommodation.

While the ships can provide some food and stores support, their main cargoes are diesel and aviation fuel. Oakleaf was capable of replenishing ships with fuel using a standard jackstay or derrick rig abeam and towed rig for astern replenishment. She was fitted to take containers on her main deck for the provision of stores and to enhance ship's stores capabilities for long deployments.

== Design ==
The normal complement was 36, composed of officers and senior and junior ratings. Among the departments, the PO (Supply) was responsible for 5,000 stores line items as well as for food and drink, clothing and bedding. The RISC (Royal Fleet Auxiliary Interim Stores Computer) system was his only assistant on board.

Oakleaf was powered by a four-cylinder Burmeister & Wain long stroke oil engine capable of developing 12,250 bhp (9,130 kW) driving a single controllable-pitch propeller. She also had bow and stern variable-pitch thrust propellers. Fitted with automatic power management, the vessel could be operated with her machinery spaces unmanned - as with her sister ships, her engines could be controlled from either the ship's bridge or the (air conditioned) machinery control room.

== Operational history ==
On 29 March 1985 approval was given to charter MV Oktania to replace the Leaf-class support tanker Plumleaf and she was purchased in June by James Fisher & Sons, Barrow-in-Furness, for bareboat charter to the Ministry of Defence (MoD). By September she had arrived on Tyneside for formal docking and inspection, and had approval granted by Lloyd's Register and the Admiralty Ship’s Name and Badge Committee, for her new name. At the end of the year invitations to tender were issued, for her conversion. At the start of 1986 she was officially presented with her Ship's Badge and in February her £5m, six month conversion work began at Falmouth, Cornwall, by Falmouth Shiprepairer Ltd. Upon completion in August, she ran sea trials and was formally renamed Oakleaf. Captain Bruce Seymour, RFA, took command and Oakleaf sailed for Plymouth, Devon, to store and then to Portland for Basic Operational Sea Training (BOST).

Oakleaf's maiden voyage was a trip to Fort Lauderdale, Florida, in September 1986. In March 1987 she berthed at Pensacola, Florida and by 25 March she had returned to Rosyth, Scotland. In September 1988 the vessel was involved in humanitarian relief operations in the Caribbean following Hurricane Gilbert, supporting the Royal Navy's Type 21 frigate Active.

The Royal Navy acted in support of United Nations resolutions and Oakleaf provided extensive support and replenished ships of an international maritime task force, formed as part of United States-led Operation Uphold Democracy, in Haiti, in September 1994.

In July 1995, the West Indies Guardship, the Royal Navy's Type 42 destroyer Southampton and her support ship, Oakleaf provided assistance following volcanic activity on the island of Montserrat.

In September 2001 she took part in Exercise Argonaut 2001, which included Exercise Saif Sareea, together with the Invincible-class aircraft carrier Illustrious, fourteen other Royal Navy warships along with the RFA’s replenishment ships Fort Victoria, Fort Rosalie and Fort Austin, the Round Table class landing ship logistics Sir Tristram, Sir Bedivere, Sir Percivale and Sir Galahad (II), sister ship Bayleaf and forward repair ship Diligence.

== Decommissioning and fate ==
In 2007 it was announced that Oakleaf would be reduced to “zero manning” along with Leaf class sister Brambleleaf. She was later decommissioned from the Royal Fleet Auxiliary and laid up awaiting disposal at Her Majesty's Naval Base in Portsmouth.

LEYAL Ship Recycling Ltd, a Turkish company, were awarded preferred bidder status for the disposal of the vessel. Ex-RFA Oakleaf left Portsmouth on 29 September 2010 in the tow of tug Mega One for Aliağa, Turkey, for breaking, arriving on 22 October 2010. On 31 January 2011 it was reported she had been dismantled and recycled, taking three months to complete.

== See also ==
- List of replenishment ships of the Royal Fleet Auxiliary
