= A82 =

A82 or A-82 may refer to:

- A82 road, in the Scottish Highlands, from Glasgow to Inverness
- Dutch Defence, in the Encyclopaedia of Chess Openings
- RFA Cherryleaf (A82), a tanker of Britain's Royal Navy
- Samsung Galaxy A82 5G, a smartphone
