= Bayleaf =

Bayleaf may refer to:

- Bay leaf, a leaf of the bay laurel
- Bayleaf (album), an album by Stone Gossard
- RFA Bayleaf, three ships of the Royal Fleet Auxiliary
- Bayleaf farmhouse, a historic building at the Weald and Downland Open Air Museum, Singleton, Sussex, England
- Bayleef, a fictional character in the Pokémon franchise
- Bayleaf the Gardener, a fictional character in the UK children's TV programme The Herbs
