= RFA Orangeleaf (A110) =

1979 Leaf-class support tanker of the Royal Fleet Auxiliary

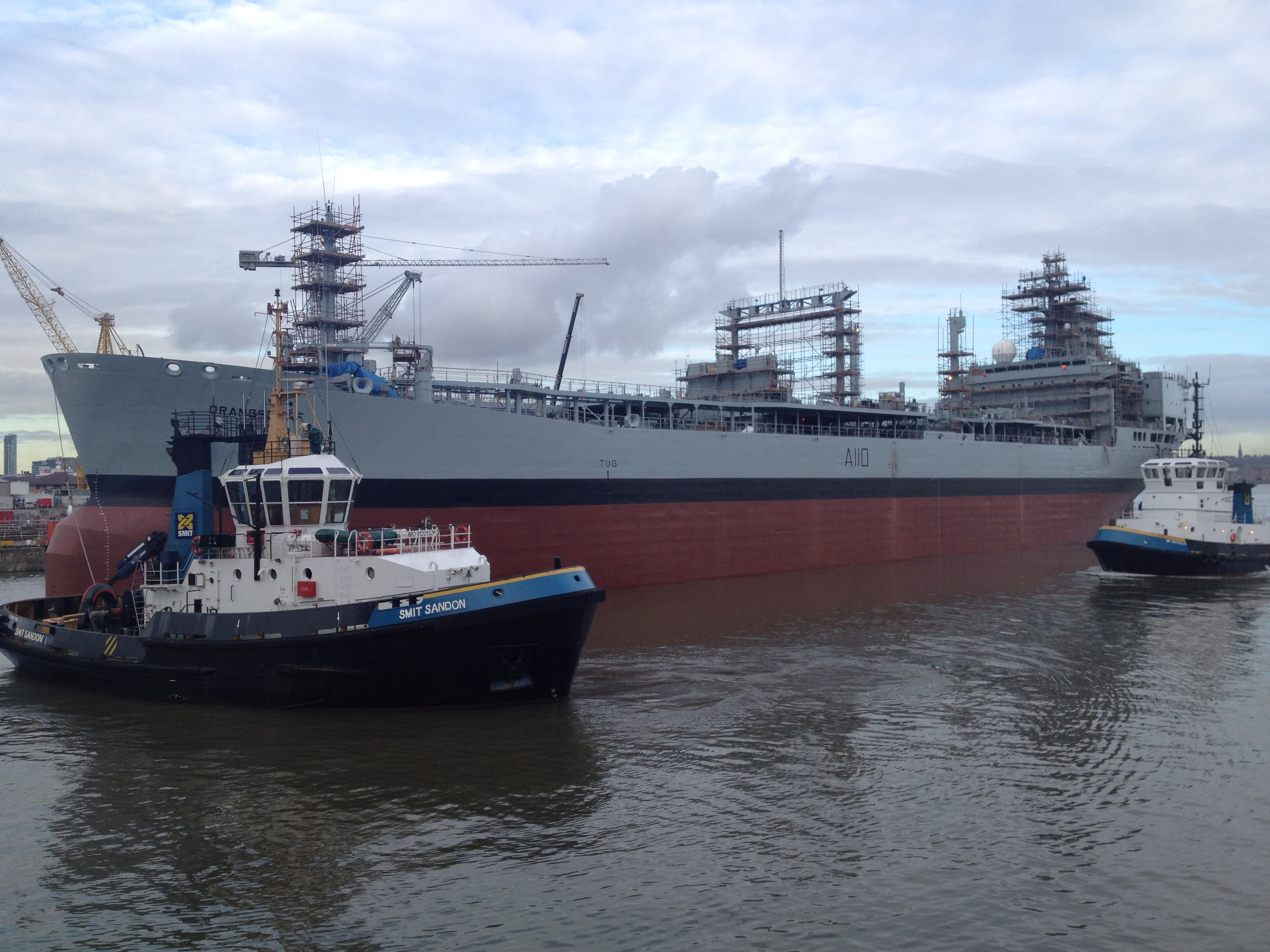
- RFA Orangeleaf during refit at Cammell Laird, Birkenhead

History

United Kingdom
- Name: RFA Orangeleaf
- Builder: Cammell Laird, Birkenhead
- Yard number: 1362
- Laid down: 20 December 1973
- Launched: 12 February 1975
- Completed: 28 June 1979
- Commissioned: 1979
- Decommissioned: 30 September 2015
- In service: 2 May 1984
- Out of service: 30 September 2015
- Identification: Pennant number: A110; Call sign: GURK; IMO number: 7342005; MMSI number: 233304000
- Honours and awards: Al Faw 2003
- Fate: Scrapped 2016

General characteristics
- Class & type: Leaf-class fleet support tanker
- Tonnage: 19,976 GRT; 13,642 NRT; 35,751 DWT
- Displacement: 40,860 t (40,215 long tons)
- Length: 560 ft (170.69 m)
- Beam: 85 ft (25.91 m)
- Draught: 39 ft (11.89 m)
- Installed power: 14,000 bhp (10,440 kW)
- Propulsion: 2 x 14-cylinder Crossley Pielstick PC2 V14 (14PC 2V) diesels; one shaft
- Speed: 15 knots (28 km/h)
- Complement: 56
- Armament: 2 20mm GAM-BO1; 4 7.62 mm GPMGs

RFA Orangeleaf was a Leaf-class fleet support tanker of the Royal Fleet Auxiliary (RFA), the naval auxiliary fleet of the United Kingdom, and which served with the fleet for over 30 years, tasked with providing fuel, food, fresh water, ammunition and other supplies to Royal Navy and allied naval vessels around the world.

She was used by the RFA in the Falklands War in 1982, but she was then known as MV Balder London. From January 2003 to April 2003 Orangeleaf was deployed for Operation Telic, the codename for the United Kingdom's military operations in Iraq. She had three Leaf-class sisters Oakleaf, Brambleleaf and Bayleaf and all four were originally designed as commercial tankers and underwent major conversions to bring them up to RFA standards and equip them for naval support.

She was the third Royal Fleet Auxiliary vessel to bear the name.

== Construction ==
Orangeleaf was one of four ships ordered from Cammell Laird at Birkenhead by Hudson Steamship Co, Brighton, and was laid down in 1973 as Hudson Progress. When the ordering company ran into financial difficulties the builders completed three of the ships but they were then laid up and later offered for charter or for purchase. On 12 February 1975 Hudson Progress was launched and the Lady Sponsor was Mrs J Appleby, wife of John Appleby, managing director of the Hudson Steamship Co. She later ran builder’s trials in July 1975, but then on completion she was laid up at Birkenhead.

In June 1979 Hudson Progress was purchased by Lloyds Industrial Leasing, London and sailed from the Mersey to the Clyde for trials. In July she was leased to Parley Augustsson, Oslo and renamed Balder London.

== Operational history ==
As MV Balder London, before joining the Royal Fleet Auxiliary, she saw action in 1982, carrying aviation fuel to the Falkland Islands from Ascension Island. At the end of the conflict, she entered the bay of San Carlos Water, East Falkland.

She was bareboat chartered on 2 May 1984 by the Ministry of Defence (MoD) and was renamed Orangeleaf. Shortly afterwards she arrived in Falmouth, Cornwall for a partial conversion. In September 1985 Orangeleaf arrived on the River Tyne for full conversion which was completed and entered operational service on 2 May 1986.

On 13 June 1988 she sailed from HMNB Portsmouth as part of Task Group 318.1, the 'Outback 88' Deployment led by the Invincible-class aircraft carrier Ark Royal, along with the Royal Fleet Auxiliary’s Fort Rosalie-class replenishment ship Fort Grange and Ol-class "fast fleet tanker" Olwen.

Orangeleaf saw action in the Gulf War. On 9 August 1990 she was deployed in support of the Royal Navy's Type 42 destroyer York, following the Iraqi invasion of Kuwait, and whilst on Armilla Patrol in the Gulf, when Operation Granby – the Gulf War – was approved.

Between 14 and 28 August 1992 she was deployed to support a humanitarian relief effort in the aftermath of Hurricane Andrew, in the West Indies, alongside the Royal Navy's Type 42 destroyer Cardiff and the Type 22 frigate Campbeltown.

During early-to-mid-2004, the ship took part in a deployment with a French carrier battle group, centred on the aircraft carrier Charles de Gaulle, to the Indian Ocean. She also appeared in the International Fleet Review 2005.

On 23 October 2009, she was moved from Birkenhead dry-docks into the River Mersey and so to the Cammell Laird shipyard to continue a major refit.

In 2011, she conducted a light jackstay transfer with HMS Dragon.

== Decommissioning and fate ==
Orangeleaf was decommissioned on 30 September 2015.

In February 2016, she was towed to Aliağa, Turkey to be broken up for scrap.

== See also ==
- List of replenishment ships of the Royal Fleet Auxiliary
