= RFA Bayleaf (A109) =

1982 Leaf-class support tanker of the Royal Fleet Auxiliary

- RFA Bayleaf

History

United Kingdom
- Name: RFA Bayleaf
- Builder: Cammell Laird, Birkenhead
- Yard number: 1366
- Laid down: 1 February 1975
- Launched: 27 October 1981
- Completed: 25 March 1982
- Decommissioned: 21 April 2011
- In service: 26 March 1982
- Out of service: 28 April 2011
- Identification: IMO number: 7342031; Pennant number: A109
- Honours and awards: Falkland Islands 1982; Kuwait 1991; Al Faw 2003
- Fate: Scrapped 2012
- Badge

General characteristics
- Class & type: Leaf-class support tanker
- Tonnage: 20,086 GRT; 11,522 NRT; 29,999 DWT
- Displacement: 37,390 t (36,799 long tons)
- Length: 170.7 m (560 ft 0 in)
- Beam: 25.9 m (85 ft 0 in)
- Height: 43.85 m (143 ft 10 in)
- Draught: 11 m (36 ft 1 in)
- Depth: 15.7 m (51 ft 6 in)
- Installed power: 14,000 hp (10,440 kW)
- Propulsion: 2 x 14-cylinder Crossley Pielstick PC2 V14 (14PC 2V) diesels; one shaft
- Speed: 15 knots (28 km/h; 17 mph)
- Complement: 56
- Armament: 2 × Oerlikon 20 mm guns; 4 × 7.62 mm machine guns
- Aircraft carried: None

Service record
- Operations: Operation Corporate; Operation Granby; Operation Telic

RFA Bayleaf (A109) was a Leaf-class support tanker of the Royal Fleet Auxiliary (RFA), the naval auxiliary fleet of the United Kingdom, which served with the fleet for 30 years, tasked with providing fuel, food, fresh water, ammunition and other supplies to Royal Navy vessels around the world.

She was involved in the Falklands War in 1982, the Gulf War in 1991, and from January 2003 to April 2003 she was deployed for Operation Telic (Op TELIC), the codename for the United Kingdom's military operations in Iraq. Bayleaf had three Leaf-class sisters Oakleaf, Brambleleaf and Orangeleaf and all four were originally designed as commercial tankers and underwent major conversions to bring them up to RFA standards and equip them for naval support.

She was the third Royal Fleet Auxiliary vessel to bear the name.

== Construction ==
Bayleaf was one of four ships ordered from Cammell Laird at Birkenhead in 1973, and laid down in 1975 as the Hudson Sound. When the ordering company ran into financial difficulties, the ships were laid up, and later were offered for sale or charter. The ship was finally launched on 27 October 1981, the Lady Sponsor was Mrs Angela Pritchard, the wife of Mr K Pritchard, Director General of the Naval Stores and Transport, Ministry of Defence (MoD). In January 1982 Captain A.E. Hunter, RFA, was appointed as Master and between 20 and 23 March she ran trials and when completed on 25 March she was then bareboat chartered to the MoD and renamed Bayleaf.

== Operational history ==
=== 1980s ===
She was almost immediately put into active service, and sailed to Gibraltar and Ascension Island en route for service in "Operation Corporate" – the Falklands War – in company with the Royal Navy's amphibious warfare ship Intrepid. She arrived at the Total Exclusion Zone on 9 June 1982, finally returning to HMMB Devonport on 31 August.

On 30 September 1982 Bayleaf sailed from HMNB Devonport in support of the Dartmouth Training Squadron's Mediterranean deployment. She arrived at Gibraltar on 4 October and then throughout the months of October and November she called at the Italian city of Naples, followed by Brindisi in Southern Italy, then onto Salonika in Greece, next to Istanbul in Turkey and then the city and seaport of Trieste in Italy, before returning to the United Kingdom, arriving at Plymouth on 24 November.

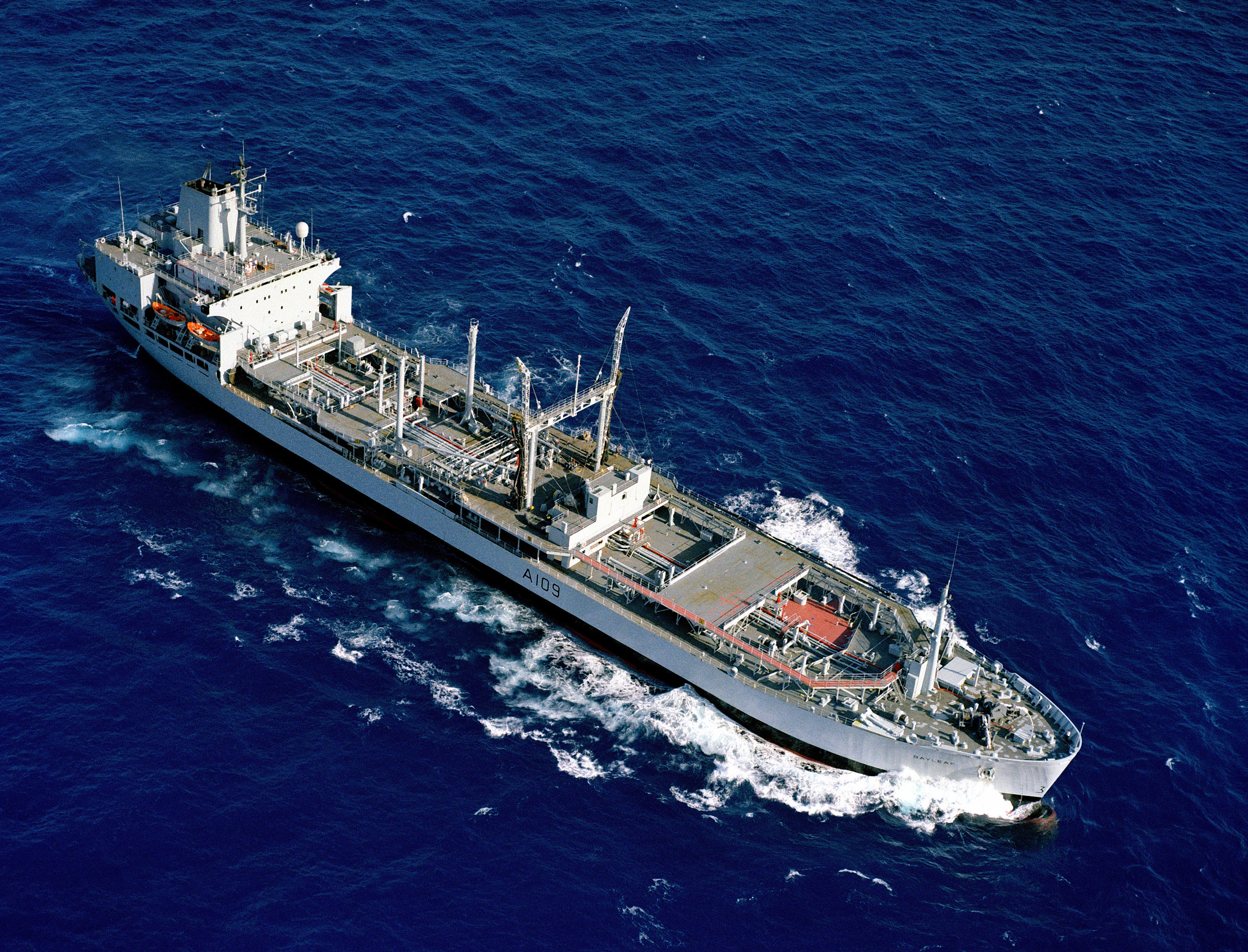
Bayleaf underway during exercise "Distant Drum", in 1983.

In December 1982 she sailed from Plymouth to Liverpool and entered refit, exiting in March 1983, then sailed back to Plymouth to re equip. Bayleaf spent two weeks in April undergoing Basic Operational Sea Training (BOST) at Portland and then spent May in the Mediterranean taking part in Exercise “Distant Drum”. Between June and August, Bayleaf sailed from HMNB Portsmouth to Singapore and back, via Port Said and Bahrain. By the end of 1983 she was back in Gibraltar.

=== 1990s ===
In January 1991 she sailed from the United Kingdom to relieve sister Leaf-class support tanker Orangeleaf, during "Operation Granby" – the First Gulf War.

On 1 March 1997 she collided with the Royal Yacht HMY Britannia while carrying out a replenishment at sea (RAS) off Karachi.

=== 2000s ===
In 2001 Bayleaf was purchased outright by the Ministry of Defence (MoD).

On 28 June 2001 she deployed to relieve sister Leaf-class support tanker Orangeleaf and was then permanently based in the Gulf. During June and August she performed replenishment at sea (RAS) with various RN, HMCS, USN and other Allied ships, returning to either anchor off Dubai or berthing at Port Rashid. In September she took part in Exercise Argonaut 2001, which included Exercise Saif Sareea, together with the Invincible-class aircraft carrier Illustrious, fourteen other Royal Navy warships and the RFA's replenishment ships Fort Victoria, Fort Rosalie and Fort Austin, the Round Table class landing ship logistics Sir Tristram, Sir Bedivere, Sir Percivale and Sir Galahad (II), sister Leaf class Oakleaf and the forward repair ship Diligence.

On 5 September 2002 she provided humanitarian aid, rescuing five crew from the Guinean cargo ship MV Falcon which sank in the Indian Ocean, and landed them at Dubai.

From January to April 2003 she was deployed on Operation Telic – the Second Gulf War.

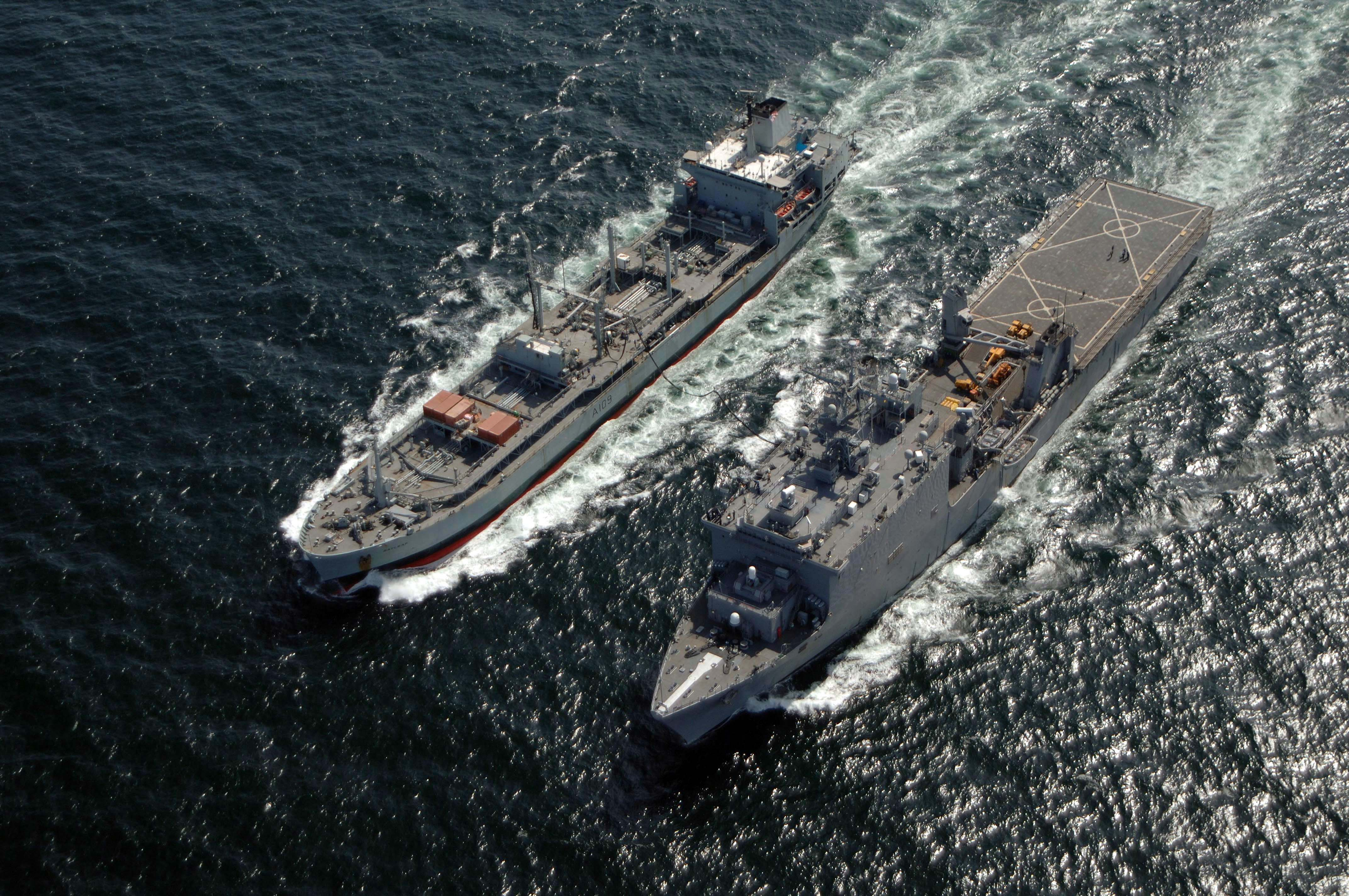
RFA Bayleaf (left) with USS Carter Hall (right) in 2006

On 2 June she began refit at Singapore and on 23 June Captain Alistair Swatridge, RFA, was appointed as commanding officer. Over 11, 12 and 17 August, Bayleaf underwent post-refit sea trials, and between 8 and 10 September she underwent Fleet Operational Standards and Training (FOST) in the South China Sea. Between October 2003 and April 2006 she deployed from and berthed at Dubai, Port Rashid and Jebel Ali, taking part in Exercise Khunjar Hadd between 5 and 9 June 2004 and conducting replenishment at sea (RAS) with many RN, RFA, RNZN, RAN, USN and other Allied naval vessels including with the amphibious assault ship USS Nassau (LHA-4) and the dock landing ship USS Carter Hall (LSD-50) on 19 February 2006, in the Persian Gulf. She arrived at Sembawang, Singapore, on 8 May 2006 for a refit and on 28 August Captain (X) Kim Watts, RFA, was appointed as commanding officer. Just over a fortnight later, on 14 September, she sailed out of Kepple Yard, Singapore for sea trials and then onto Sembawang, arriving 15 September 2006.

On 1 November 2008 she sailed from HMNB Devonport and entered Cammell Laird, Merseyside, three days later, for a £9.1 m refit. On 7 April 2009, Captain Charles F. Simmons, RFA, was appointed as commanding officer and on 5 June she sailed from Birkenhead, on completion of the refit, to HMNB Devonport. Later in June Bayleaf sailed to Loch Striven, a sea loch in Argyll and Bute, Scotland, to undertake various trials there. On 17 July, Captain (X) Nigel Budd, RFA, was appointed as commanding officer.

In autumn 2009 Bayleaf underwent FOST at Portland and upon completion sailed to Soudha Bay, Crete, before transiting the Suez Canal arriving at Bahrain on 18 November.

=== 2010s ===
In January 2010 she deployed as the Gulf Tanker, Captain S.P. Donkersly, RFA, was appointed as the new commanding officer on 21 April 2010 and during May, June and July she RAS’ed with many RN, RAN, USN and various other Allied naval vessels.

Following the reductions to the Royal Navy fleet outlined in the 2010 "Strategic Defence and Security Review", published in October 2010, it was decided that Bayleaf would be paid off in April 2011.

On 20 October 2010, Captain Charles F. Simmons, RFA, was appointed as commanding officer and Bayleaf continued with various duties until 13 February 2011 when she sailed from Dubai eventually arriving at HMNB Portsmouth on 15 April 2011.

== Decommissioning and fate ==
The Royal Fleet Auxiliary Ensign was lowered for the final time on 20 April 2011 for Bayleaf, she was removed from the RFA Flotilla and a ceremony was held to commemorate all she and her crew have achieved since 1982.

LEYAL Ship Recycling Ltd, a Turkish company, were awarded preferred bidder status for the disposal of the vessel in 2012. Following this, the ex-RFA Bayleaf was towed out of Portsmouth on 2 August 2012. She arrived in Aliağa, Turkey, on 22 August where the ship was broken up. On 10 December it was reported she had been dismantled and recycled, taking four months to complete.

== Battle honours ==
On 12 April 1985 RFA Bayleaf was awarded her Falkland Islands 1982 Battle honour by Mrs Angela Pritchard, wife of Director General Stores and Transport (Navy) (DGST (N)).

== See also ==
- Bristol Group
- List of replenishment ships of the Royal Fleet Auxiliary
