= RFA Bayleaf =

Three ships of the Royal Fleet Auxiliary have borne the name RFA Bayleaf:

- RFA Bayleaf was an oiler, previously the civilian vessel Cevic. She was bought in 1914 and used as a dummy vessel to imitate the battlecruiser HMS Queen Mary. In 1915 she was converted to an oiler and renamed RFA Bayol. She was renamed Bayleaf in 1917 and sold to Royal Dutch Shell in 1920.
- RFA Bayleaf (A79) was a Leaf-class tanker, built as the civilian London Integrity for London & Overseas Freighters in 1955. She was bareboat chartered in 1959 and returned to her owners in 1973.
- RFA Bayleaf (A109) was a Leaf-class tanker, laid down in 1975 as Hudson Sound. She was bareboat chartered in 1982 and decommissioned in 2011.
