= RFA Oakleaf =

Two ships of the Royal Fleet Auxiliary (RFA) have borne the name RFA Oakleaf:

- RFA Oakleaf (1899) was the ocean liner Montezuma, acquired by the RFA in 1915 as a dummy battleship to imitate HMS Iron Duke, and named Abadol. She was renamed Oakleaf in 1917 and was sunk by a U-boat later that year.
- RFA Oakleaf (A111) was a Leaf-class tanker launched in 1981 as the Oktania. She was acquired by the RFA in 1986 and was retired from active service as in 2007 and later scrapped.
