= Sprite-class tanker =

Class of two aviation spirits carriers of the Royal Fleet Auxiliary

Class overview
- Name: Sprite class
- Builders: Blythswood Shipbuilding Company Ltd
- Operators: Royal Fleet Auxiliary
- Preceded by: Dale class
- Succeeded by: Ranger class
- Built: 1940–1943
- In commission: 1941–1964
- Completed: 2
- Retired: 2

General characteristics
- Type: Spirits tanker
- Tonnage: 965 GRT
- Length: 204 ft 6 in (62.33 m)
- Beam: 33 ft 3 in (10.13 m)
- Draught: 12 ft 9 in (3.89 m)
- Propulsion: Triple-expansion engines, 900 ihp (670 kW)
- Speed: 11 knots (13 mph; 20 km/h)

The Sprite class were a class of spirit tankers that served with the Royal Fleet Auxiliary, supporting the Royal Navy during the Second World War. They went on to support British and allied fleet units during the Cold War.

== Class overview ==
Two ships were eventually built by the Blythswood Shipbuilding Company Ltd, Airsprite and Nasprite. They entered service in the during the Second World War and were used to carry aviation fuel and petroleum. Both survived the war, serving mainly in British waters and the Mediterranean Sea, and continued in service until being retired in the early 1960s and scrapped soon afterwards.

== Ships ==
Name	Pennant	Builder	Laid down	Launched	Completed	Fate
Airsprite	A115	Blythswood Shipbuilding Company Ltd	September 1941	22 December 1942	16 February 1943	Scrapped in 1965
Nasprite	A252	Blythswood Shipbuilding Company Ltd	April 1940	28 November 1940	11 February 1941	Scrapped in 1964

== See also ==
- List of replenishment ships of the Royal Fleet Auxiliary
