= HMAS Westralia =

Two ships of the Royal Australian Navy (RAN) have been named HMAS Westralia:

- HMAS Westralia (F95), a passenger vessel launched in 1929, requisitioned for RAN service as an armed merchant cruiser in 1939, converted into an infantry landing ship in 1943, and returned to her civilian owners in 1951
- HMAS Westralia (O 195), a Leaf-class replenishment oiler acquired from the British Royal Fleet Auxiliary in 1989, and decommissioned in 2006

== Battle honours ==
Ships named HMAS Westralia are entitled to carry six battle honours:

- Pacific 1941–45
- New Guinea 1943–44
- Leyte Gulf 1944
- Lingayen Gulf 1945
- Borneo 1945
- Kuwait 1991

== See also ==
- SS Westralia (1897), a passenger liner converted into a troopship and sunk in 1942
