= Ol-class tanker (1918) =

Class of six replenishment oilers of the Royal Fleet Auxiliary

- RFA Olcades

Class overview
- Name: Ol class
- Operators: Royal Fleet Auxiliary
- In service: 1918–1952
- Completed: 6
- Retired: 6

General characteristics
- Type: Tanker
- Displacement: 10,200 DWT
- Length: 444.1 ft (135.4 m)
- Beam: 57 ft 2 in (17.42 m)
- Draught: 27.2 ft (8.3 m)
- Propulsion: 1 screw, triple expansion engine, 3100 hp; 3 Scotch boilers
- Speed: 11 knots (20 km/h; 13 mph)
- Range: 10,000 nmi (19,000 km) at 16 kn (30 km/h; 18 mph)
- Complement: 43

The Ol-class tankers were Royal Fleet Auxiliary (RFA) replenishment oilers built from 1917 to 1919, tasked with providing fuel and other supplies to Royal Navy vessels around the world. There were six ships in the class. Until 1936 they were managed by Davies and Newman with RFA crews, after which time they were transferred to the British Admiralty.

The lead ship of the class, RFA Olcades, was originally built as British Beacon and acquired for RFA use in 1918. She was renamed in 1936. The six ships in the Ol class saw wide service during World War II as far afield as India, Singapore and the Far East.

== Construction programme ==
Name	Pennant	Builder	Laid down	Launched	Into service	Out of service	Ref
Olcades (ex-British Beacon)	X18	Workman Clark, Belfast		9 September 1918	9 October 1918	April 1953	
Oligarch (ex-British Lantern)	X12	Workman Clark, Belfast	1918	30 June 1918	1 August 1918	14 April 1946	
Olynthus (ex-British Star)	X11	Swan Hunter & Wigham Richardson, Wallsend	20 June 1917	14 February 1918	March 1918	1949	
Olwen (ex-British Light)	X09	Palmers Shipbuilding and Iron Company, Jarrow	1917	3 October 1917	17 April 1937	1947	
Olna	X47	His Majesty's Naval Base, Devonport	14 June 1920	21 June 1921	10 October 1921	18 May 1941	
Oleander	X46	Pembroke Dockyard, Pembroke Dock	1 December 1920	26 April 1922	20 October 1922	26 May 1940	

== See also ==
- List of replenishment ships of the Royal Fleet Auxiliary
