= HMAS Westralia (O 195) =

Leaf-class support tanker of the Royal Fleet Auxiliary and Royal Australian Navy

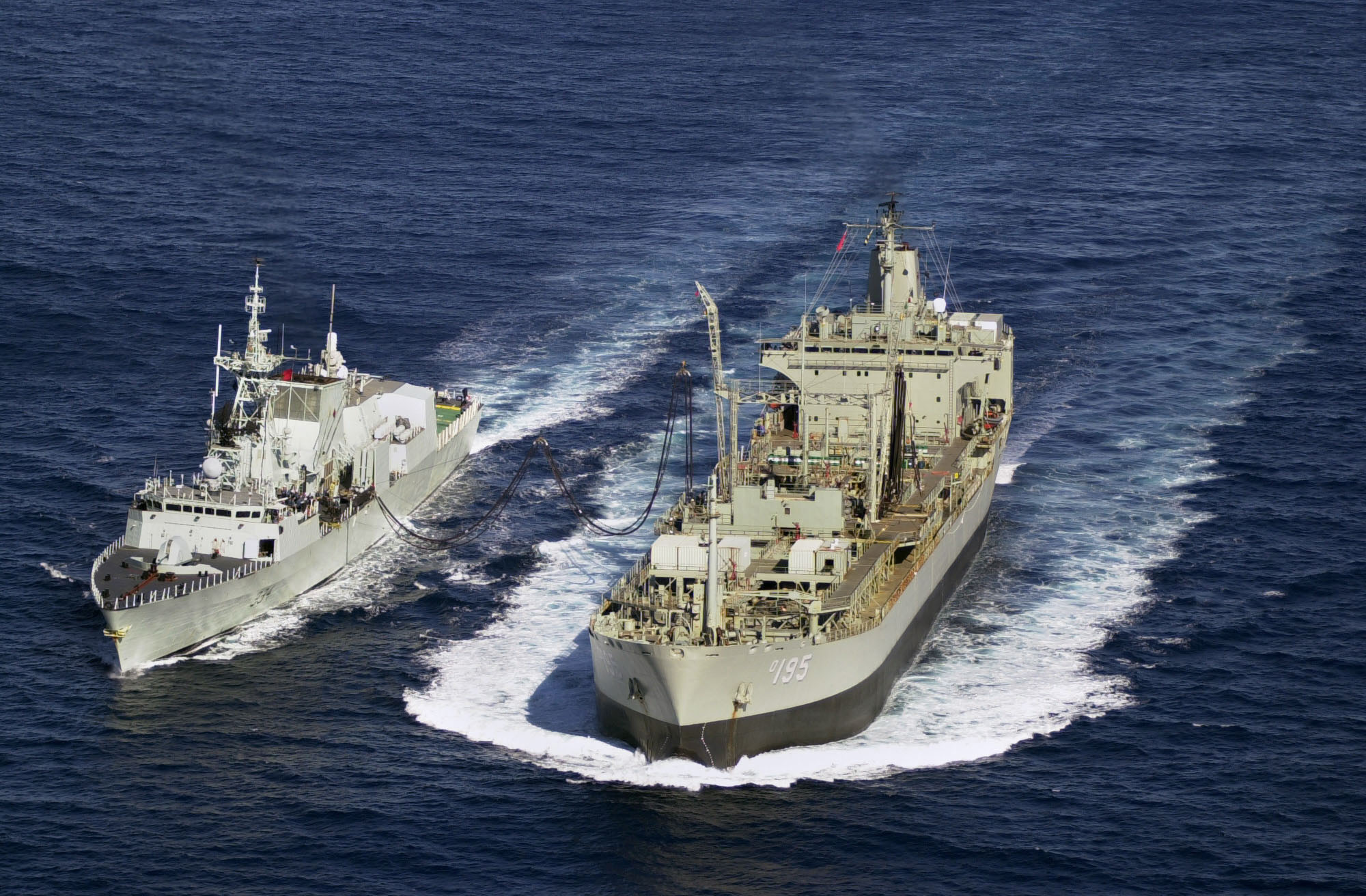
- HMAS Westralia replenishing the Canadian frigate HMCS Regina in 2001

History

United Kingdom
- Name: Appleleaf
- Builder: Cammell Laird
- Laid down: 5 November 1973
- Launched: 24 July 1975
- In service: 8 June 1979
- Out of service: 24 September 1989
- Identification: IMO number: 7342017; Pennant number: A79
- Honours and awards: Battle honours: Falkland Islands 1982
- Fate: Leased, then sold to the RAN

Australia
- Name: Westralia
- Commissioned: 9 October 1989
- Decommissioned: 16 September 2006
- Identification: IMO number: 7342017
- Motto: "Faithful and Bold"
- Honours and awards: Battle honours: Kuwait 1991; Plus five inherited honours
- Fate: Scrapped
- Badge

General characteristics
- Class & type: Modified Leaf-class replenishment oiler
- Displacement: 40,870 tonnes (full load)
- Length: 171 m (561 ft 0 in)
- Beam: 26 m (85 ft 4 in)
- Draught: 12.03 m (39 ft 6 in) maximum
- Propulsion: 2 × SEMT–Pielstick 14 PC2-2 V400 diesel engines; one shaft
- Speed: 17 knots (31 km/h; 20 mph)
- Capacity: 25,000 tons of fuel
- Complement: 96
- Armament: Two .50 cal Browning machine guns
- Aviation facilities: Helicopter landing platform, no permanent carrying capacity

HMAS Westralia (O 195) was a modified Leaf-class replenishment oiler which served with the Royal Australian Navy (RAN) from 1989 to 2006. Formerly RFA Appleleaf (A79), she served in with the British Royal Fleet Auxiliary (RFA) from 1975 to 1989. The ship was initially leased to the RAN, then purchased outright in 1994. In 1998, a fire onboard resulted in the deaths of four sailors. Westralia was decommissioned in 2006, and the ship was sold into civilian service for use as a Floating Production Storage and Offloading vessel, under the name Shiraz. However, the ship was laid up in Indonesia until late 2009, when she was sold to a Turkish ship breaking company. Arriving in January 2010, the vessel was scrapped.

== Design and construction ==
The vessel had a full load displacement of 40,870 tons, a length of 171 metres (561 ft 0 in), a beam of 26 metres (85 ft 4 in), and a maximum draught of 12.03 metres (39 ft 6 in). Propulsion machinery consists of two SEMT Pielstick 14 PC2-2 V400 diesel engines, supplying the single, controllable-pitch propeller with 14,000 brake horsepower (10,000 kW). Maximum speed was 17 knots (31 km/h; 20 mph). The ship's company consisted of up to 96 personnel. The ship was configured to replenish two ships abeam (one on either side), or one following astern. Up to 25,000 tonnes of fuel were carried, including aviation fuel.

The vessel was originally built by Cammell Laird as Hudson Cavalier, one of four STaT 32-class oil tankers ordered by John Hudson Fuel and Shipping. She was laid down at the Birkenhead shipyard on 5 November 1973. After construction had started on three of the four ships, John Hudson found it could not afford to pay for them. Cammell Laird completed the three vessels, with Hudson Cavalier launching on 24 July 1975, and after sea trials were completed, all three were laid up in port while the shipbuilder sought to charter or sell them. On 27 October 1978, the Ministry of Defence expressed interest in chartering two of the tankers, and after conversion for use as an underway replenishment vessel, Hudson Cavalier entered service with the RFA on 8 June 1979 as RFA Appleleaf. The ship was acquired under a ten-year bareboat charter.

== Operational history ==
=== Appleleaf ===
During the Falklands War in 1982, Appleleaf was one of the Leaf-class ships that were involved in supplying the Task Force sent south to retake the islands. The vessel later received the battle honour "Falkland Islands 1982" for her involvement in the conflict.

In December 1983, while visiting New Zealand, a member of the ship's company was charged with killing a woman and injuring three others in an alcohol-fuelled incident.

Between November 1986 and October 1988, Appleleaf was deployed to the Persian Gulf with the Armilla Patrol.

On 5 July 1989, the ship completed her last replenishment at sea as part of the RFA. Her ten-year charter concluded on 24 September 1989.

=== Westralia ===
Although the RAN had originally intended to acquire two Durance-class replenishment oilers, problems and cost overruns during construction of the first, HMAS Success, over the course of the mid-1980s meant that the option for a second was never taken up. The RAN needed a second replenishment vessel to operate in the Indian Ocean as part of the Two-Ocean Policy, and plans were made to instead acquire a less capable vessel. As Appleleaf was coming to the end of her RFA charter, the decision was made to lease the vessel to the RAN on 27 September 1989, and after a brief refit, she commissioned as HMAS Westralia on 9 October. Part of the A$30 million, five-year lease was covered by the decommissioning and sale of fleet tender HMAS Stalwart in 1990. Westralia arrived at Fremantle on 20 December 1989.

In March 1990, Westralia sailed from Fremantle on her first overseas deployment. During this, the ship called into at least seven South-east Asian ports, participated in 55th anniversary celebrations for the Royal Malaysian Navy, and was part of several training exercises. In late June, Westralia docked at Singapore, where she underwent a four-month refit. During this, she was fitted to carry an RBS 70 missile system and two .50 calibre machine guns as defensive armament, and was fitted with a flight deck on the aft superstructure to facilitate vertical replenishment. The ship had returned to her home port of HMAS Stirling by late October.

On 26 January 1991, Westralia relieved Success as part of Combined Task Group 627.4, the Australian naval contribution to forces involved in the Gulf War. Five female sailors and two female officers were included in Westralia's ship's company: the first time Australian women had been deployed to a combat zone. The ship remained in the Gulf until June, when she was replaced by HMAS Darwin. Westralia's service was later recognised with the battle honour "Kuwait 1991". On 26 August, Westralia and HMAS Swan sailed for Luzon in the Philippines, to provide humanitarian aid following the eruption of Mount Pinatubo. In 1994, the five-year lease of the ship concluded, and the Australian government purchased the ship from the British.

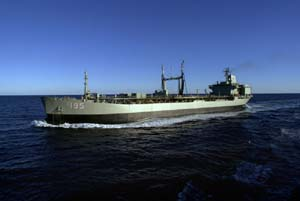
Westralia in 2001

On 5 May 1998, a flexible fuel hose in the ship's engine room burst. The spraying fuel ignited when it came into contact with hot machinery, and the first-response extinguishers were unable to cope with the fire's intensity. It took two hours for the fire to be extinguished, and four sailors died from carbon monoxide poisoning. A Board of Inquiry reported in December that a different type of hose inappropriate for an engine-room environment was fitted, the civilian contractors that fitted the hose had not passed the configuration changes to the Lloyd's Register classification society as required, and that personnel aboard Westralia did not have the training and qualifications required for their responsibilities. Repairs and modifications were made to the ship, and she returned to operational service during 2000.

During January 2002, Westralia and the frigate HMAS Canberra were deployed to the Southern Ocean to capture illegal fishing vessels reported in the area. Two vessels were captured, with six people arrested for poaching A$2.5 million worth of fish, and 37 others deported.

== Decommissioning and fate ==
In 2003, the Australian Defence Capability Review indicated the need to replace Westralia with a new, double hulled vessel, which was slated to be purchased in 2005 for entry into service during 2006. Westralia was decommissioned on 16 September 2006 at HMAS Stirling, with about half of Westralia's personnel transferring to her replacement, HMAS Sirius, when she commissioned on the same day.

After being decommissioned, Westralia was sold to the AGR Group and Helix Energy Solutions Group for conversion to a Floating Production Storage and Offloading (FPSO) vessel. The ship was renamed Shiraz, and was marketed to help South-east Asian companies assess the long-term potential of their oil fields. After leaving Stirling in February 2007, Shiraz was transported to Indonesia, where from May 2007 she was laid-up in Great Karimun and advertised for sale. In December 2009, the vessel was sold to a Turkish ship breaking yard, and was towed to Aliağa, Turkey, where she arrived on 16 January 2010. Shiraz was broken up by Leyal Ship Recycling Ltd.

== See also ==
- List of replenishment ships of the Royal Fleet Auxiliary
