= RFA Airsprite =

1943 Sprite-class spirits tanker of the Royal Fleet Auxiliary

History

United Kingdom
- Name: RFA Airsprite
- Ordered: 2 July 1941
- Laid down: September 1941
- Launched: 22 December 1942
- Commissioned: 16 February 1943
- Decommissioned: October 1963
- Fate: Arrived at Antwerp for scrapping on 14 March 1965

General characteristics
- Class & type: Sprite-class tanker
- Tonnage: 965 GRT
- Displacement: 1900 long tons
- Length: 214 ft (65.23 m)
- Beam: 33 ft 2 in (10.11 m)
- Draught: 12 ft 9.75 in (3.91 m)
- Propulsion: 3 cyl triple expansion steam. 162 nhp. One shaft.
- Speed: 10 knots (19 km/h)

RFA Airsprite (A115) was a Sprite-class spirits tanker of the Royal Fleet Auxiliary. She was laid up in reserve at Devonport in October 1963, and put up for disposal in January 1965.
