= RFA Appleleaf (A83) =

1959 Leaf-class support tanker of the Royal Fleet Auxiliary

History

United Kingdom
- Name: RFA Appleleaf (A83)
- Launched: 22 April 1955 as George Lyras
- Commissioned: 1959 and renamed Appleleaf
- In service: 17 April 1959
- Out of service: 1970
- Identification: IMO number: 5020990; Pennant number: A83
- Fate: Returned to her owners in 1970, scrapped 6 June 1980

General characteristics
- Class & type: Leaf-class tanker
- Displacement: 17,960 tons full load
- Length: 556 ft 6 in (169.62 m)
- Beam: 71 ft 5 in (21.77 m)
- Draught: 30 ft 6 in (9.30 m)
- Propulsion: 1 × 6-cylinder Doxford diesel.
- Speed: 14.5 knots (26.9 km/h)

RFA Appleleaf (A83) was a Leaf-class tanker of the Royal Fleet Auxiliary in service between 1959 and 1970.
