= RFA Nasprite =

1941 Sprite-class spirits tanker of the Royal Fleet Auxiliary

History

United Kingdom
- Name: RFA Nasprite
- Ordered: 9 October 1939
- Laid down: 7 March 1940
- Launched: 28 November 1940
- Commissioned: 11 February 1941
- Decommissioned: 31 August 1954
- Fate: Scrapped 1964

General characteristics
- Class & type: Sprite-class tanker
- Tonnage: 965 GRT
- Length: 214 ft (65.23 m)
- Beam: 33 ft 2 in (10.11 m)
- Draught: 12 ft 9.75 in (3.91 m)
- Propulsion: 3 cyl triple expansion steam. 162 nhp. One shaft.
- Speed: 10 knots (19 km/h)

RFA Nasprite (A252) was a Sprite-class tanker of the Royal Fleet Auxiliary. She served during the Second World War.

She was laid up in reserve at Devonport on 31 August 1954, and put up for disposal in August 1963. She arrived at Amsterdam for scrapping at Willebroek on 5 February 1964.
