= RFA Reliant (A84) =

1957 air stores support ship of the Royal Fleet Auxiliary

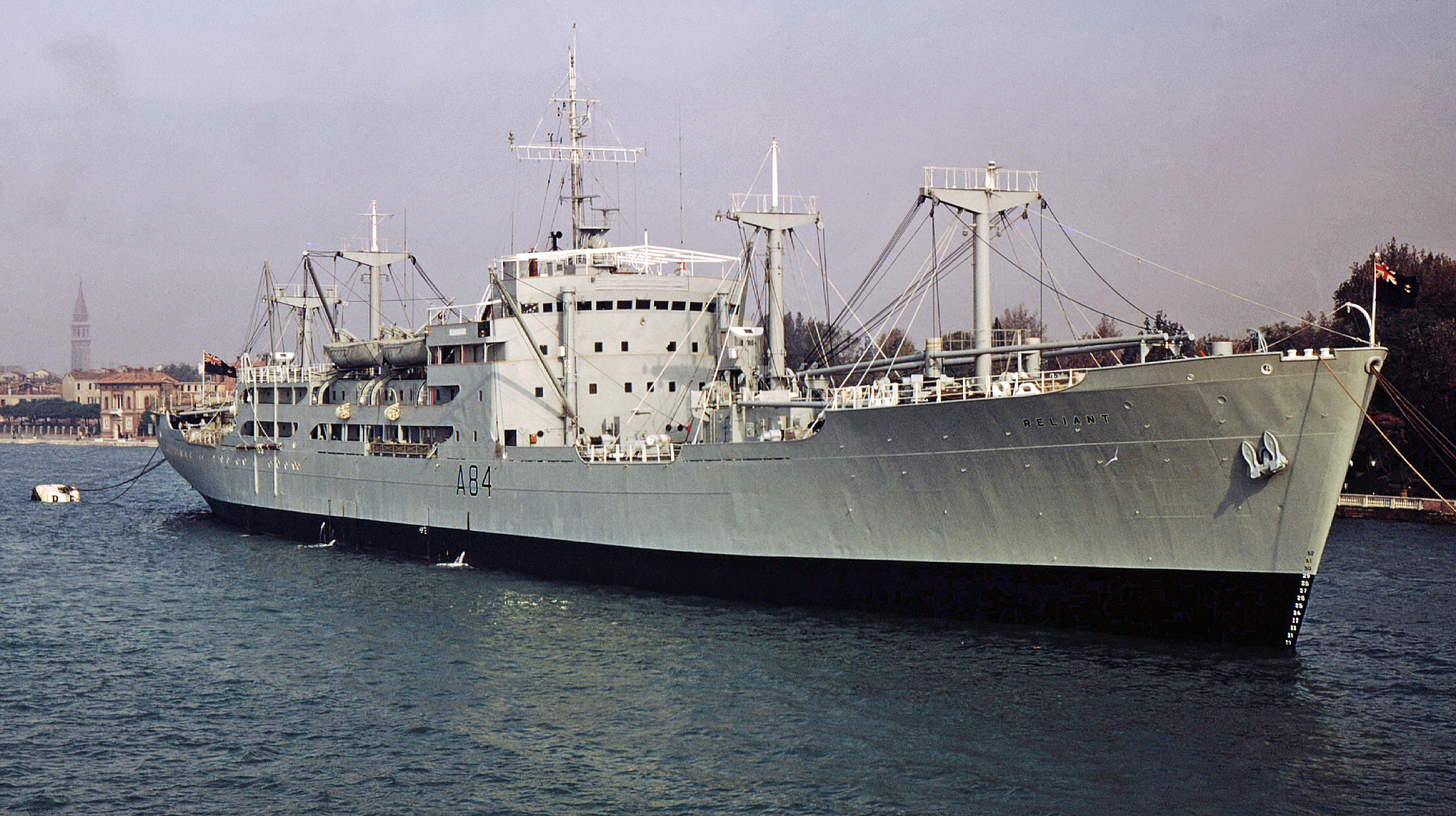
- A84 Reliant 1972 in Venice

History

United Kingdom
- Builder: James Laing & Sons
- Launched: 9 September 1953 as Somersby.
- Commissioned: 11 August 1957 as RFA Somersby.
- Decommissioned: 7 May 1976
- Renamed: 23 September 1958 as RFA Reliant.
- Identification: IMO number: 5292646; Pennant number: A84
- Fate: Demolished on 23 August 1977.

General characteristics
- Displacement: 13,737 tons full load
- Length: 486 ft 10 in (148 m)
- Beam: 61 ft 6 in (19 m)
- Draught: 26 ft 3 in (8 m)
- Propulsion: 1 × 6-cylinder Doxford diesel, 8250 bhp; 1 × shaft
- Speed: 17 knots
- Complement: 110
- Aircraft carried: Fitted with a large helicopter cargo landing deck but had no hangar facilities.

RFA Reliant (A84) was an air stores support ship of the Royal Fleet Auxiliary (RFA), the naval auxiliary fleet of the United Kingdom. She was formerly the commercial general cargo vessel Somersby which was purchased in 1956 and renamed on completion of her conversion in 1958. She was fitted for replenishing aircraft carriers at sea with a wide range of air, naval and victualling stores. As refitted she had a helicopter landing pad built over the poop deckhouse.

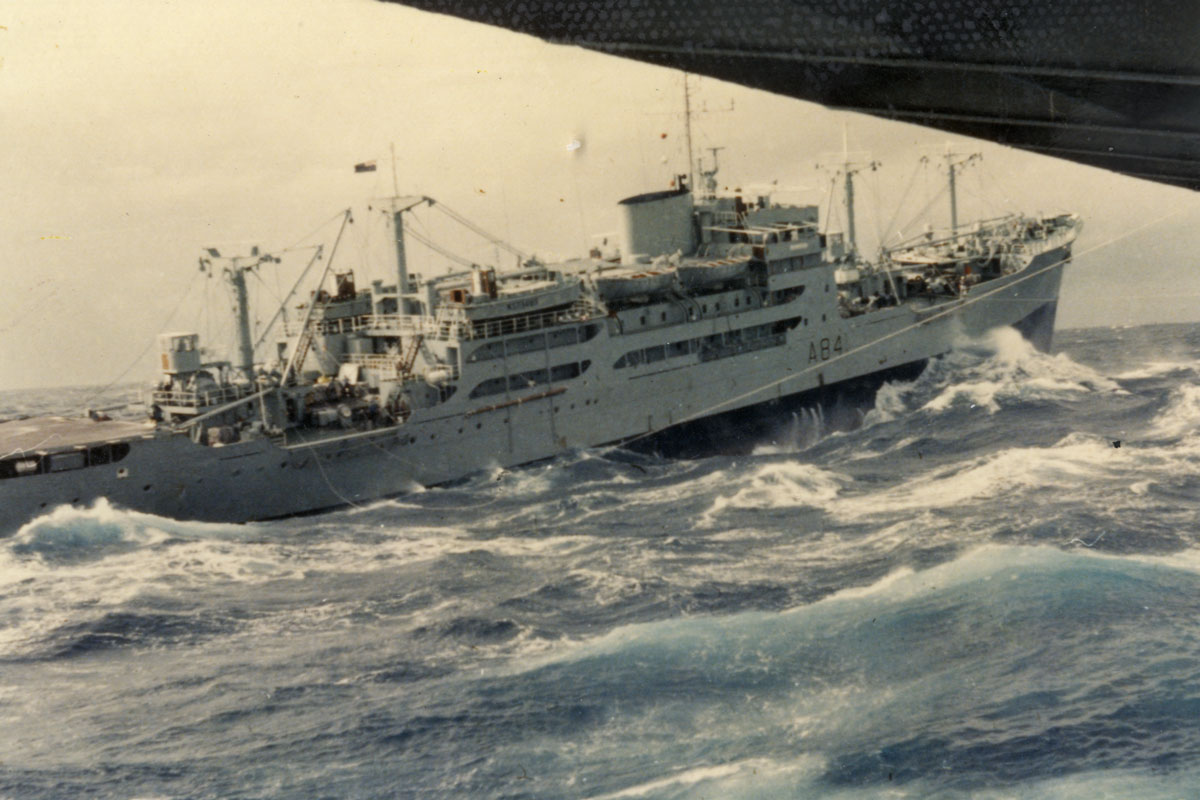
Bow and stern lines have been made in preparation for load carrying hawsers to be slung across

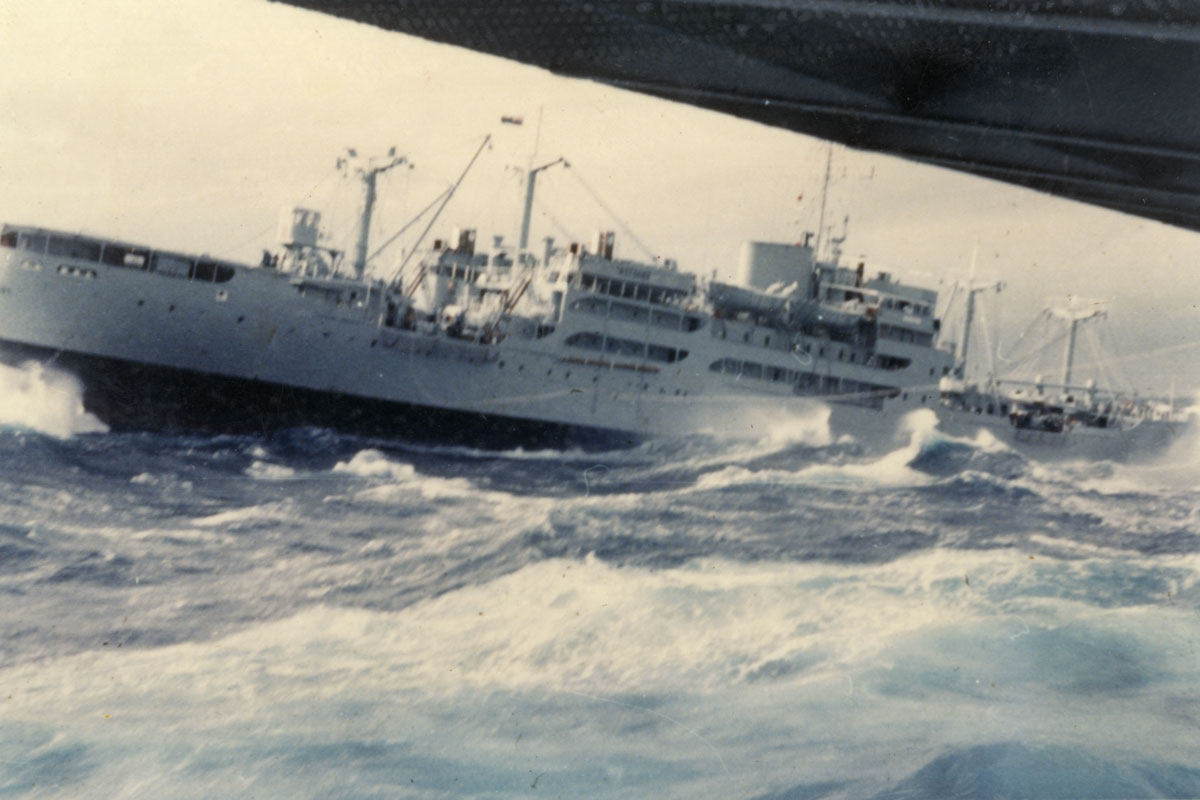
RAS (replenishment at sea) could be a weekly occurrence on long voyages as additional food and other stores are required.
