= RFA Freshspring =

1947 Fresh-class water tank vessel of the Royal Fleet Auxiliary

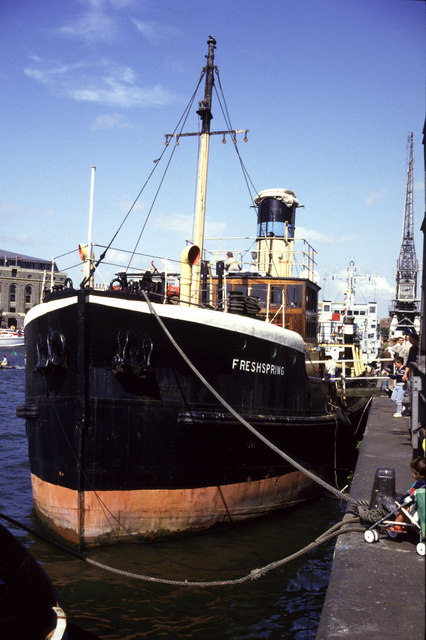
- Freshspring at Prince's Wharf, Bristol, 1986

History

United Kingdom
- Name: Freshspring
- Builder: Lytham Shipbuilding & Engineering Company, Lytham St Annes, Lancashire
- Yard number: 886
- Laid down: 1946
- Launched: 15 August 1946
- Completed: 10 February 1947
- In service: 1947
- Out of service: 1977
- Identification: 1181554
- Status: Preserved

General characteristics
- Class & type: Fresh-class water tank vessel
- Tonnage: 283 GT
- Length: 36.88 m (121 ft 0 in)
- Beam: 7.47 m (24 ft 6 in)
- Depth: 3.2 m (10 ft 6 in)
- Installed power: Triple expansion reciprocating steam engine
- Propulsion: Single screw propeller
- Speed: 9.5 knots (17.6 km/h)

RFA Freshspring was a Fresh-class water tank vessel of the Royal Fleet Auxiliary. She survives in civilian hands as SS Freshspring, the last surviving example of the Fresh-class ships. The last of fourteen ships, she was used to carry fresh water out to larger ships. She is listed on the National Register of Historic Vessels maintained by National Historic Ships.

== Working career ==
Freshpring was the last of the Fresh-class vessels to be built, and was launched by Lytham Shipbuilding & Engineering Company, Lytham St Annes, Lancashire on 15 August 1946.

Following initial trials, she sailed to Malta, replacing one of her sister ships which had been sunk during the Second World War. Originally coal fired by hand, she was converted while in Malta to burn heavy fuel oil, with oil burners being fitted in each of the three furnaces in the Scotch boiler. Completing around 15 years service in Malta she was repatriated to the UK, working around River Clyde and the west coast of Scotland for the Port Auxiliary Service. In 1969 she was surveyed and refitted at Ardrossan, then towed to Gareloch where she remained possibly laid-up out of service. In 1977 she was put up for sale and was sold two years later for a Bristol company to evaluate alternative ship fuels, which is where it is thought she was last in steam. Following vandalism and theft in Bristol, which saw the loss of equipment from the wheelhouse such as the telegraph, she was moved to Newnham on Severn where she remained until 2016.

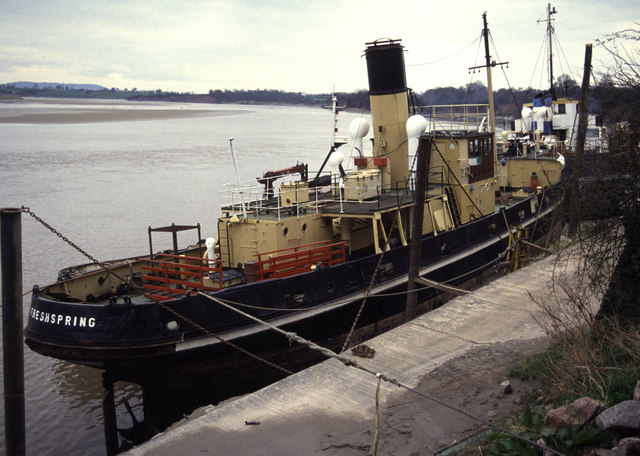
Freshspring at Collow Pill, Newnham on Severn, 1992

== Preservation ==
Freshspring's condition deteriorated while lying on the banks of the River Severn at Newnham. In 2011, two holes appeared in her hull, the plating became very pitted and she foundered in the mud. Her machinery remained in excellent condition though, with her engine room, steam steering gear and accommodation areas intact, although the galley and officers' quarters have been dismantled. In 2013 a Charitable Incorporated Organisation (CIO), The Steamship Freshspring Society, was formed to preserve and operate Freshspring.

In April 2016 the SS Freshspring Society obtained a National Memorial Heritage Fund grant of £155,000 to remove the ship from Newnham on Severn to a dry dock in Sharpness for essential repairs and tow the ship to a new permanent mooring in Bideford. The Freshspring left Newnham on Severn on 6 July 2016 and arrived in Bideford on 16 October 2016. Since then a great deal of work has been undertaken on the ship to enhance its appearance and restore machinery to working order. In December 2017 the Society obtained a Lottery grant to restore the wheelhouse, carry out repairs to the decking and other parts of the ship and employ an Education Officer for two years. The Education Officer's role is to devise a programme of visits to and from educational establishments and open the ship to the public. In 2018 the restored wheelhouse was in place and the ship hosted over 1200 students, many returning during the holiday period with their parents.

During 2019 work on maintaining and enhancing the ship continued. There is now a wind and PV powered electrical system, new planking on the upper deck and many areas below and above deck have been repainted and restored. During the year the society obtained / borrowed on long-term loan several items of the type used on Freshspring including wheels, binnacle, radio and an intercom. At the Society's AGM it was agreed that the organisation would be renamed the Steamship Freshspring Trust. In November 2019 a Crowdfunding appeal was launched to fund an awning to cover the forward deck and this appeal successfully concluded in January 2020. The awning is expected to be in place by the end of March 2020.

The ship is open for visits and further information can be found on their Website here.

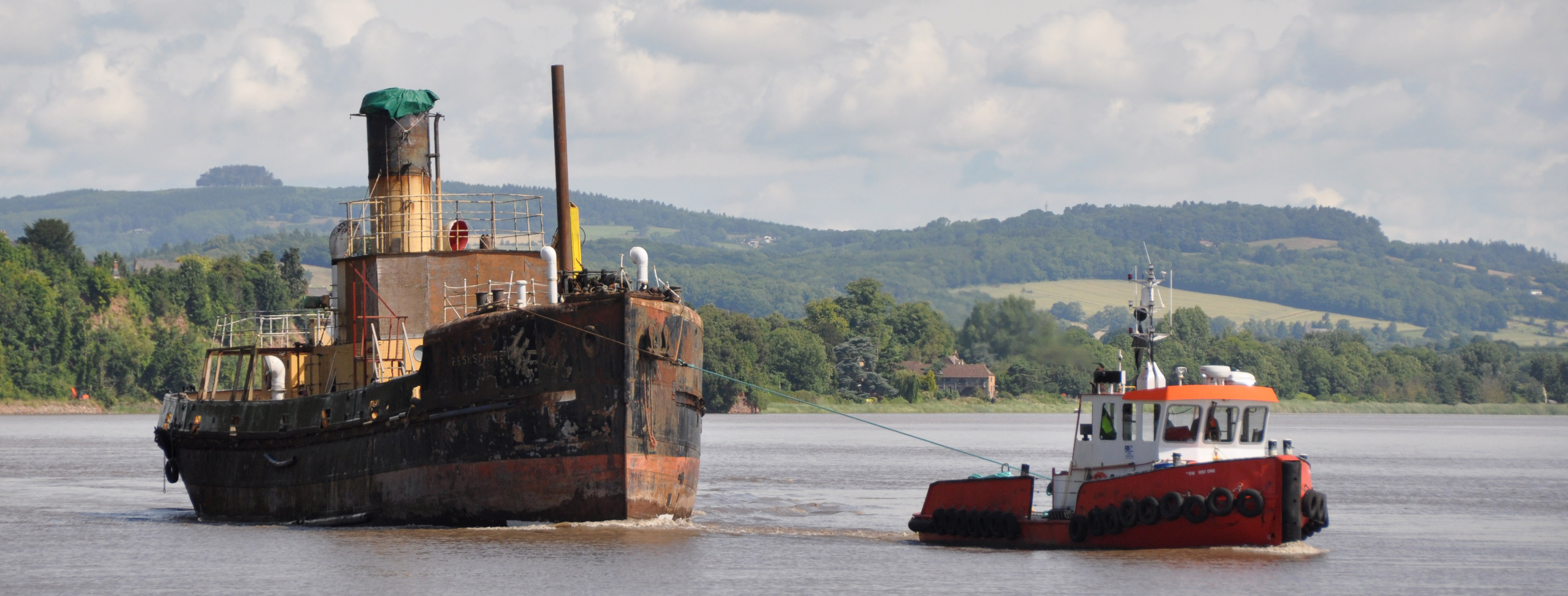
