= RFA Brambleleaf (1959) =

1959 Leaf-class support tanker of the Royal Fleet Auxiliary

History

United Kingdom
- Name: London Loyalty (1953–59), RFA Brambleleaf(1959–72) Mayfair Loyalty (1972–74)
- Owner: London and Overseas Freighters (1953–72), Mayfair Tankers (1972–76)
- Port of registry: (United Kingdom) London (1953–59); (United Kingdom); (Liberia) Monrovia (1972–76)
- Builder: Furness Shipbuilding Co., Stockton-on-Tees, England
- Yard number: 454
- Laid down: 26 May 1952
- Launched: 16 April 1953 as London Loyalty
- Completed: 10 January 1954
- In service: 22 May 1959 and renamed Brambleleaf
- Out of service: Returned to her owners in March 1972 & name changed to Mayfair Loyalty
- Renamed: London Loyalty (1953-59), Mayfair Loyalty (1972-76)
- Identification: IMO number: 5050244; Pennant number: A81
- Fate: Scrapped July 1976

General characteristics
- Class & type: Leaf-class tanker
- Tonnage: 12,123 GRT, 7,042 NRT, 17,960 DWT
- Propulsion: 1 × 6-cylinder Doxford single-acting two-stroke diesel engine.

RFA Brambleleaf (A81) was a Leaf-class small tanker of the Royal Fleet Auxiliary (RFA), the naval auxiliary fleet of the United Kingdom.

RFA Brambleleaf was built by Furness Shipbuilding Company of Stockton-on-Tees. She was launched as the civilian London Loyalty for London & Overseas Freighters in 1953 and completed on 8 January 1954. She was a sister ship of RFA Bayleaf built by the same shipyard for LOF the following year.

She was bareboat chartered for the RFA in 1959 and renamed RFA Brambleleaf. She was returned to her owners in 1972, who transferred her to their Mayfair Tankers subsidiary and registered her in Liberia as the Mayfair Loyalty.

On 9 September 1974 she was laid up at La Spezia, Italy. On 27 February 1976 she was sold for scrap, and demolition began in La Spezia in July of that year.

== Sources and further reading ==
- Sedgwick, Stanley; Kinnaird, Mark; O'Donoghue, K.J. (1993) [1992]. London & Overseas Freighters, 1948-92: A Short History. World Ship Society. ISBN 0-905617-68-1.
- Sedgwick, Stanley; Sprake, R.F. (1977). London & Overseas Freighters Limited 1949-1977. World Ship Society. ISBN 0905617037.
