= RFA Pearleaf (A77) =

1960 Leaf-class support tanker of the Royal Fleet Auxiliary

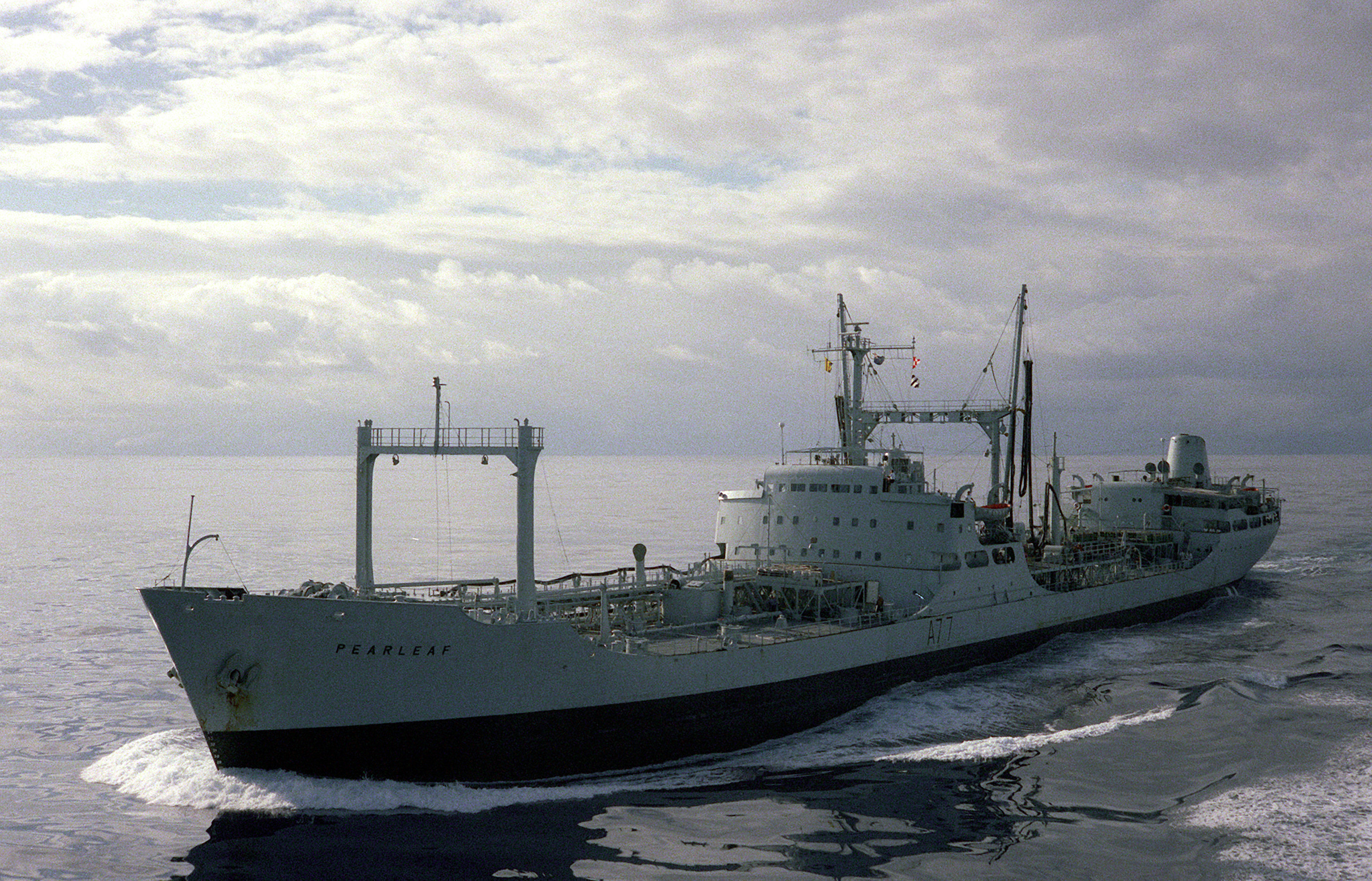
- RFA Pearleaf (A77) in 1986

History

United Kingdom
- Name: RFA Pearleaf
- Builder: Blythswood Shipbuilding Co. Ltd, Scotstoun, Glasgow
- Launched: 15 October 1959
- Completed: 15 January 1960
- In service: 28 January 1960
- Out of service: 9 May 1986
- Identification: IMO number: 5272593; Pennant number: A77
- Fate: Sold, 1986; Scrapped, 1993

General characteristics
- Class & type: Leaf-class tanker
- Displacement: 25,790 long tons (26,204 t)
- Length: 568 ft (173 m)
- Beam: 72 ft (22 m)
- Draught: 30 ft (9.1 m)
- Propulsion: 1 × 6-cylinder Doxford diesel engine, 1 shaft
- Speed: 15 knots (28 km/h; 17 mph)

Service record
- Operations: Falklands War

RFA Pearleaf (A77) was a Leaf-class support tanker of the Royal Fleet Auxiliary of the United Kingdom. She was the second ship to bear the name.
