= RFA Plumleaf (A78) =

Leaf-class support tanker of the Royal Fleet Auxiliary

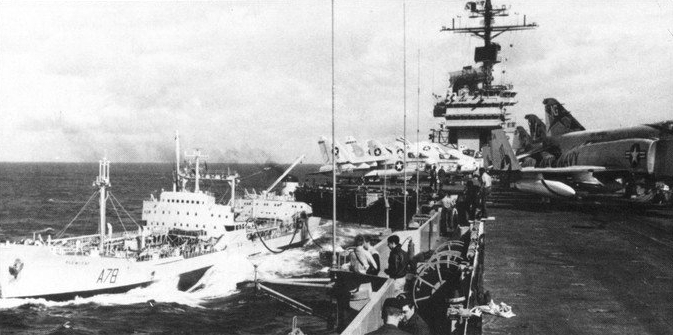
- Plumleaf refueling USS America (CVA-66), circa 1970

History

United Kingdom
- Name: RFA Plumleaf
- Operator: Royal Fleet Auxiliary
- Builder: Blyth Shipbuilding & Dry Docks Company Ltd
- Launched: 29 March 1960
- Completed: August 1960
- Decommissioned: May 1986
- In service: 24 August 1960
- Out of service: 1986
- Identification: IMO number: 5279979; Pennant number: A78
- Honours and awards: Falkland Islands 1982
- Fate: Scrapped in Kaohsiung 17 December 1986

General characteristics
- Class & type: Leaf-class tanker
- Tonnage: 12,692 GRT; 7,306 NRT; 18,562 DWT
- Displacement: 24,940 t (24,546 long tons)
- Length: 562 ft 0 in (171.30 m)
- Beam: 72 ft 1 in (21.97 m)
- Draught: 30 ft 6 in (9.30 m)
- Depth: 39 ft 1 in (11.91 m)
- Installed power: 9,500 bhp
- Propulsion: 1 × 6-cylinder Doxford diesel.
- Speed: 14 knots (26 km/h)

RFA Plumleaf (A78) was a Leaf-class support tanker of the Royal Fleet Auxiliary (RFA), the naval auxiliary fleet of the United Kingdom.

Launched on 29 March 1960, she measured 12,692 gross register tonnage, with a length of 562 feet, a beam of 72 feet 1 inch and a draught of 30 feet 1/4 inch. She was powered by a 6-cylinder diesel engine giving the ship a top speed of 14 knots.

Plumleaf was built for Wm Cory & Son Ltd, London, as Corheath, by Blyth Shipbuilding Company, however, her charter was agreed early and she ran trials as Plumleaf before entering RFA service in 1960.

She saw service during the Falklands War. Plumleaf was decommissioned in 1986, arriving at Kaohsiung for demolition on 17 December 1986.

== Battle honours ==
On 23 November 1984 Plumleaf received her Falklands Islands 1982 Battle honour, presented by Admiral Sir Nicolas Hunt, GCB LVO – FOSNI.
