= RFA Cherryleaf (A82) =

Leaf-class support tanker of the Royal Fleet Auxiliary

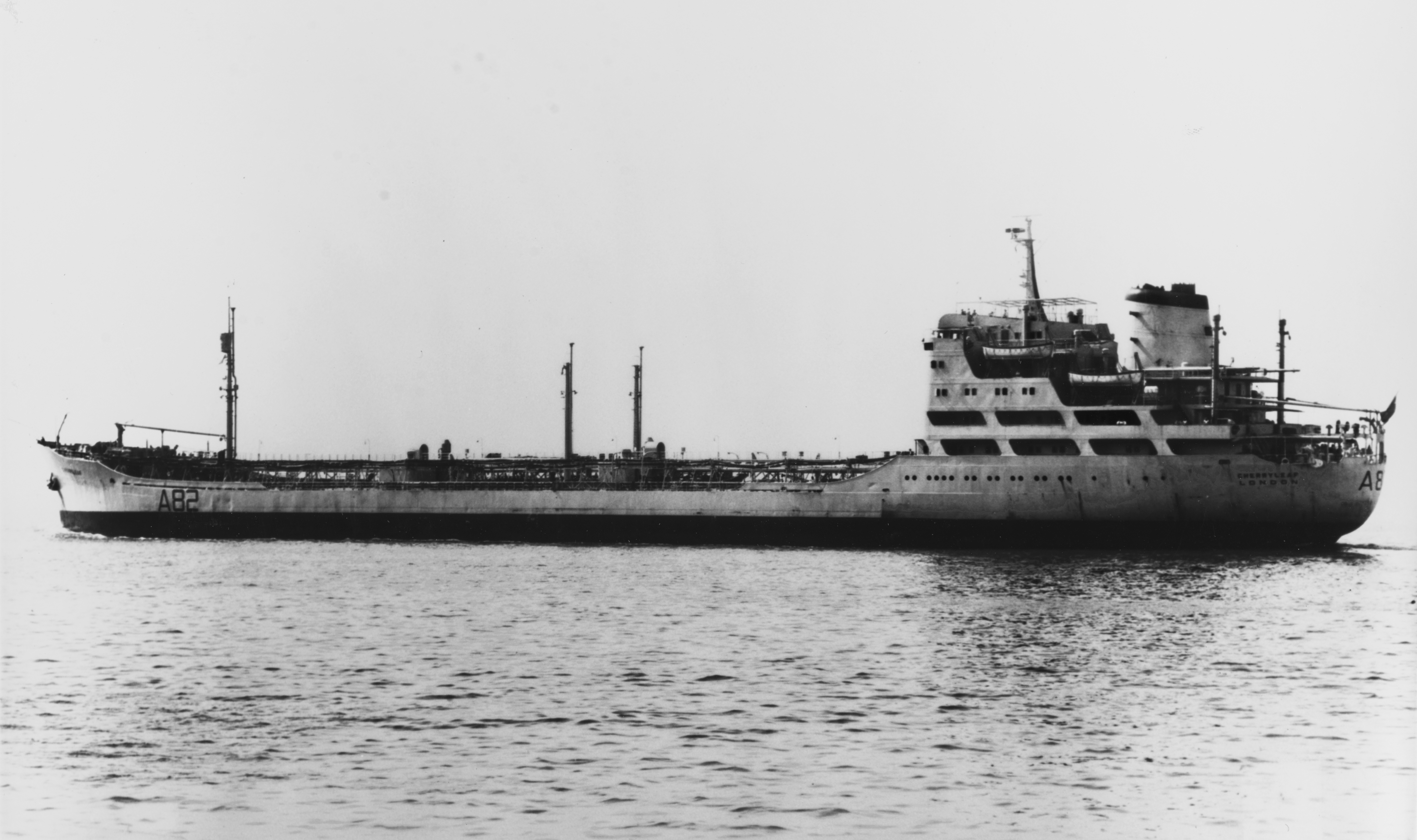
- Cherryleaf in August 1975

History
- Name: Overseas Adventurer (1963–73; 1980–81); RFA Cherryleaf (1973–80); Petrostar XVI
- Owner: London and Overseas Bulk Carriers (1963–81) Petrostar Co Ltd (1981–86)
- Operator: London & Overseas Freighters (1963–73; 1980–81); Royal Fleet Auxiliary (1973–80)
- Port of registry: (United Kingdom) London (1963–73; 1980–81); (United Kingdom) (1973–80); (Saudi Arabia) (1981–87)
- Builder: Nordseewerke
- Yard number: 321
- Launched: 16 October 1962
- Completed: 21 February 1963
- Decommissioned: 1980 (RFA)
- Renamed: Overseas Adventurer (1962–73; 1980–81); Petrostar XVI (1981–87)
- Identification: IMO number: 5407681; Pennant number: A82
- Fate: Constructive total loss 1986 scrapped 1987

General characteristics
- Class & type: Leaf-class tanker
- Tonnage: 14,027 GRT; 7,764 NRT; 19,770 DWT
- Displacement: 18,560 t (18,267 long tons)
- Length: 559 ft 4 in (170.48 m)
- Beam: 72 ft (22 m)
- Draught: 29 ft 6 in (8.99 m)
- Depth: 39 ft 4 in (11.99 m)
- Installed power: 8,400 bhp
- Propulsion: 7–cylinder MAN diesel
- Speed: 14.5 knots (26.9 km/h)

RFA Cherryleaf (A82) was a Leaf-class small fleet tanker of the Royal Fleet Auxiliary (RFA), the naval auxiliary fleet of the United Kingdom, in service from 1973 to 1980.

== History ==
She was built by Nordseewerke in Emden, Germany and launched in 1962 as Overseas Adventurer for London and Overseas Bulk Carriers, a subsidiary of London & Overseas Freighters (LOF). She was bareboat chartered for the RFA in February 1973 and renamed RFA Cherryleaf.

In 1980 she was returned to LOF and her name reverted to Overseas Adventurer. In 1981 LOF sold her to Petrostar Co Ltd of Saudi Arabia who renamed her Petrostar XVI.

On 5 April 1986 during the Tanker War phase of the Iran–Iraq War she was off Halul Island en route from Bahrain to Sharjah when Iranian helicopters hit her with AGM-65 Maverick missiles. Her accommodation was gutted by fire and four crewmembers were killed. She was towed to Sharjah where she was declared a constructive total loss on 9 April 1986 and laid up for disposal. She was sold to National Ship Demolition Co Ltd of Taiwan, arrived Kaohsiung on 24 January 1987 and her demolition began on 19 February 1987.

== See also ==
- List of replenishment ships of the Royal Fleet Auxiliary

== Sources and further reading ==
- ACIG (2004). "Tanker War, 1980-88". Arabian Peninsula & Persian Gulf Database. ACIG: 26. Archived from the original on 2 April 2008.
- Sedgwick, Stanley; Kinnaird, Mark; O'Donoghue, K.J. (1993) [1992]. London & Overseas Freighters, 1948-92: A Short History. World Ship Society. ISBN 0-905617-68-1.
- Sedgwick, Stanley; Sprake, R.F. (1977). London & Overseas Freighters Limited 1949-1977. World Ship Society. ISBN 0905617037.
