= RFA Bayleaf (A79) =

1959 Leaf-class support tanker of the Royal Fleet Auxiliary

History

United Kingdom
- Name: London Integrity (1955–59, 1973–77) RFA Bayleaf (1959–73)
- Port of registry: (United Kingdom) (1955–59, 1973–77)
- Builder: Furness Shipbuilding Co., Stockton-on-Tees, England
- Yard number: 460
- Launched: 28 October 1954
- Commissioned: 16 June 1959 and renamed Bayleaf
- Decommissioned: Returned to her owners in March 1973; name reverted to original
- Renamed: London Integrity (1954-59 and 1973-77)
- Homeport: London (with LOF)
- Identification: IMO number: 5038466; Pennant number: A79
- Fate: Scrapped in January 1977

General characteristics
- Class & type: Leaf-class tanker
- Tonnage: 12,126 GRT, 6,940 NRT, 17,930 DWT
- Length: 556 ft 6 in (169.62 m)
- Beam: 71 ft 5 in (21.77 m)
- Draught: 30 ft 6 in (9.30 m)
- Installed power: 6800 bhp
- Propulsion: 1 × 6-cylinder Doxford single-acting two-stroke diesel engine.
- Speed: 14 knots (26 km/h)
- Notes: sister ship: RFA Brambleleaf (A81)

RFA Bayleaf (A79) was a Leaf-class support tanker of the Royal Fleet Auxiliary, and the second ship to bear the name.

Bayleaf was launched by the Furness Shipbuilding Company of Stockton-on-Tees. She was launched as the civilian London Integrity for London & Overseas Freighters in 1954 and completed in 1955. She was a sister ship of RFA Brambleleaf (A81) built by the same shipyard for LOF the previous year.

She was bareboat chartered for the RFA in 1959 and renamed RFA Bayleaf. She was returned to her owners in 1973, with whom she traded as the London Integrity again until the end of 1976.

On 7 January 1977 she was sold for scrap and on 25 January 1977 she arrived in Burriana in Spain to be broken up.

== Sources and further reading ==
- Sedgwick, Stanley; Kinnaird, Mark; O'Donoghue, K.J. (1993) [1992]. London & Overseas Freighters, 1948-92: A Short History. World Ship Society. ISBN 0-905617-68-1.
- Sedgwick, Stanley; Sprake, R.F. (1977). London & Overseas Freighters Limited 1949-1977. World Ship Society. ISBN 0905617037.
