= RFA Cherryleaf (1959) =

1959 Leaf-class support tanker of the Royal Fleet Auxiliary

History

United Kingdom
- Name: RFA Cherryleaf
- Builder: Sir James Laing & Sons, Sunderland
- Launched: 28 May 1953
- Commissioned: 15 May 1959
- Decommissioned: 4 February 1966
- Identification: IMO number: 5069697; Pennant number: A82
- Fate: Returned to owners, 1966; Scrapped 1975

General characteristics
- Class & type: Leaf-class tanker
- Tonnage: 12,402 GRT; 7,338 NRT; 18,560 DWT
- Length: 544 ft (166 m)
- Beam: 72 ft 9 in (22.17 m)
- Draught: 30 ft 8 in (9.35 m)
- Propulsion: 6-cylinder Doxford diesel, 6,600 bhp (4,900 kW)
- Speed: 13.25 knots (15.25 mph; 24.54 km/h)

RFA Cherryleaf (A82) was a Leaf-class fleet support tanker of the Royal Fleet Auxiliary.

Launched in 1953 as Laurelwood, the ship was acquired by the RFA, and renamed Cherryleaf in 1959.

In 1966 the ship was returned to her previous owners and renamed Agios Constantinos. She was renamed Aeas in 1967, and as Irene's Fortune in 1972. She was scrapped on 13 December 1975.
