= RFA Orangeleaf (A80) =

1959 Leaf-class support tanker of the Royal Fleet Auxiliary

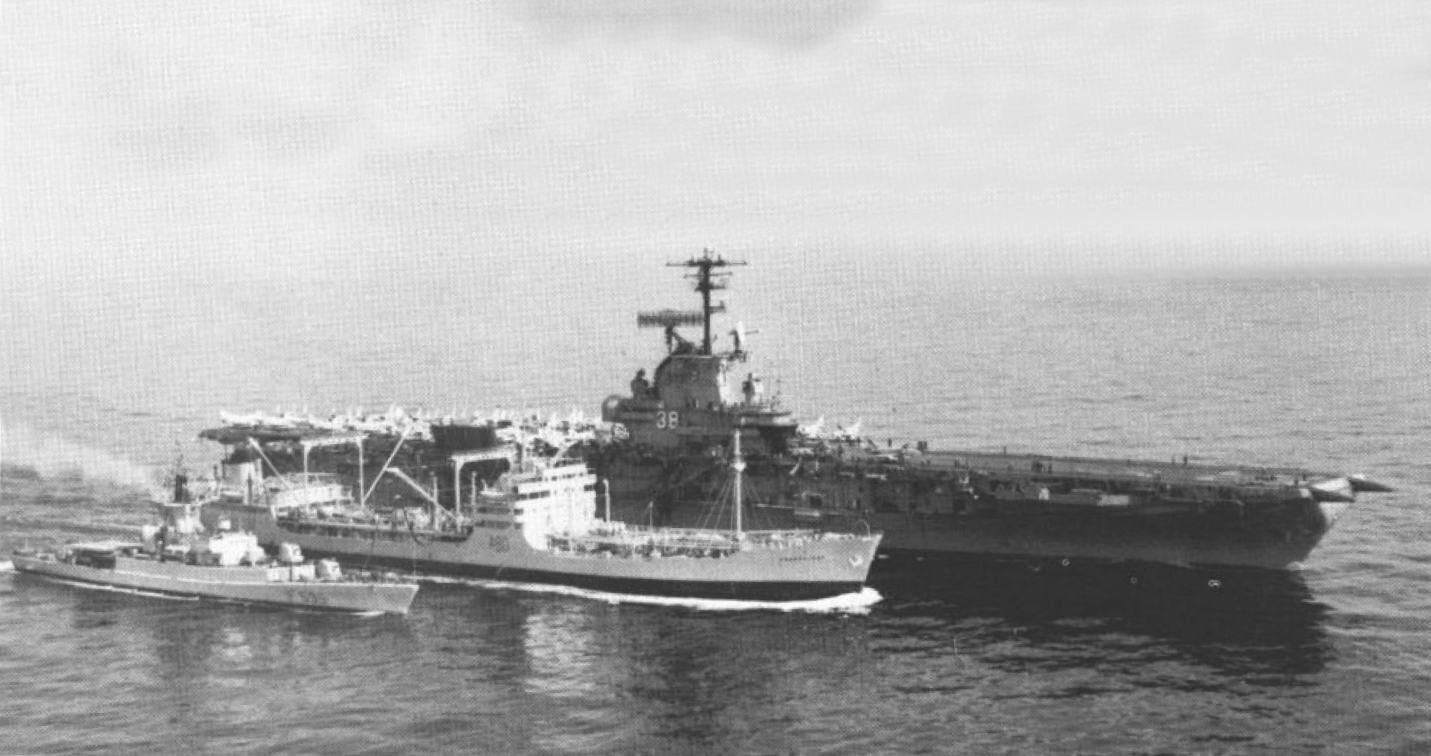
- Orangeleaf refueling USS Shangri-La and Carlo Martgottini, in 1967

History

United Kingdom
- Name: RFA Orangeleaf (A80)
- Operator: Royal Fleet Auxiliary
- Builder: Furness Shipbuilding Company
- Laid down: 27 November 1953
- Launched: 8 February 1955 as Southern Satellite
- Commissioned: 25 May 1959 and renamed Orangeleaf
- Decommissioned: May 1978
- Identification: IMO number: 5264041; Pennant number: A80
- Fate: Scrapped 1978

General characteristics
- Class & type: Leaf-class tanker
- Tonnage: 12,481 GRT; 6,949 NRT; 17,475 DWT
- Displacement: 17,960 tons full load
- Length: 556 ft 6 in (169.62 m)
- Beam: 71 ft 5 in (21.77 m)
- Draught: 30 ft 6 in (9.30 m)
- Propulsion: 1 × 6-cylinder Doxford diesel.
- Speed: 14.5 knots (26.9 km/h)

RFA Orangeleaf (A80) was a Leaf-class support tanker of the Royal Fleet Auxiliary of the United Kingdom. She was launched on 8 February 1955 as Southern Satellite for the South Georgia Co Ltd by Furness Shipbuilding & Engineering Co Ltd of Haverton-Hill. On 25 May 1959 she was bare-boat chartered by the Admiralty and renamed Orangeleaf before being refitted by Barclay, Curle & Co Ltd. She served in the Royal Fleet Auxiliary until July 1978 when she was returned to her owners at Singapore who sold her for scrap. She arrived for scrapping at Seoul, South Korea on 14 September 1978.
