= RFA Brambleleaf (A81) =

1980 Leaf-class support tanker of the Royal Fleet Auxiliary

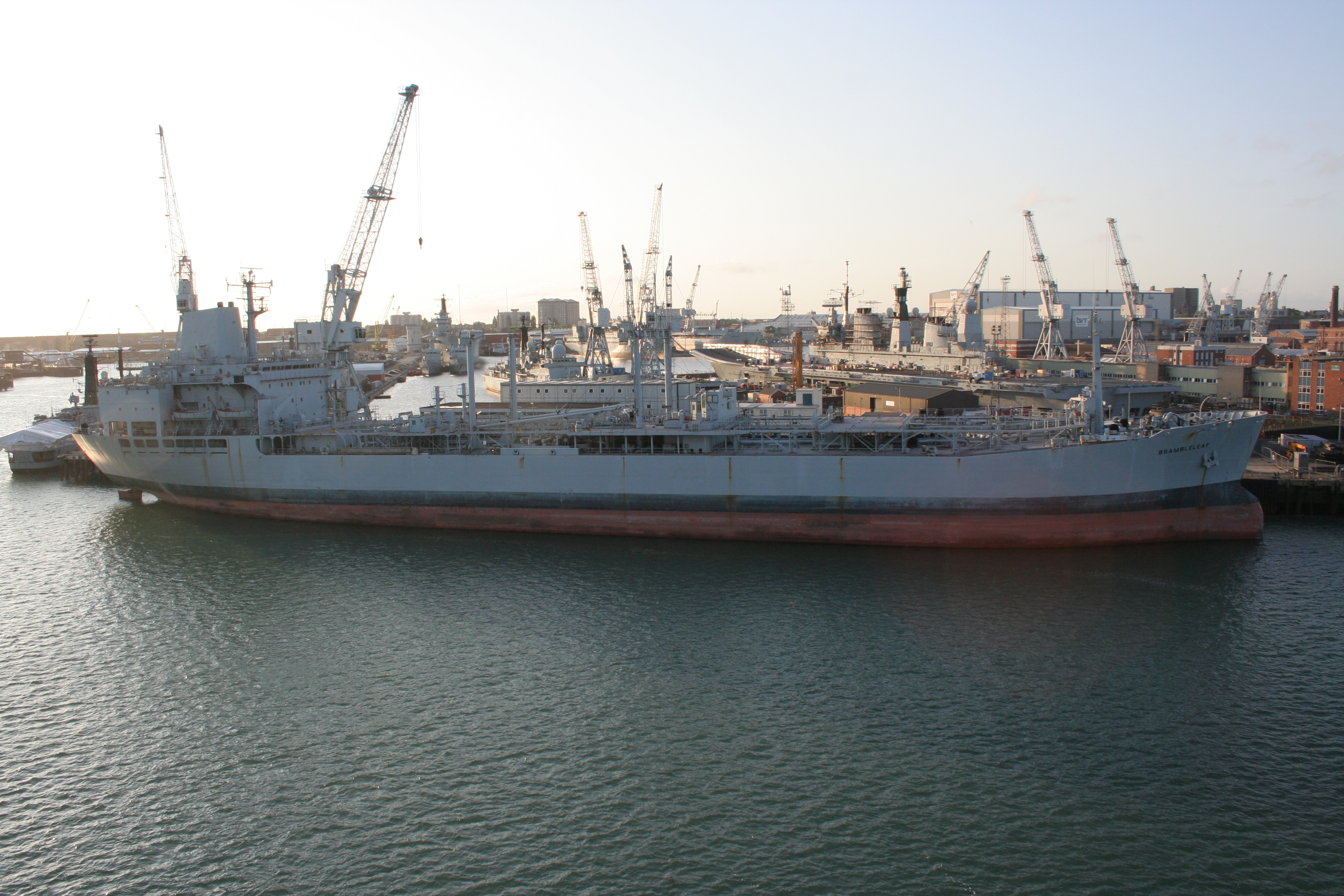
- RFA Brambleleaf at Portsmouth Harbour

History

United Kingdom
- Name: RFA Brambleleaf
- Ordered: 30 April 1973
- Builder: Cammell Laird, Birkenhead
- Laid down: 23 July 1974
- Launched: 22 January 1976
- Commissioned: 20 February 1980
- Out of service: September 2007
- Identification: IMO number: 7342029; Pennant number: A81
- Honours and awards: Falkland Islands 1982; Al Faw 2003
- Fate: Scrapped August 2009

General characteristics
- Class & type: Leaf-class tanker
- Displacement: 40,870 t (40,225 long tons) full load
- Length: 170.7 m (560 ft 0 in)
- Beam: 25.9 m (85 ft 0 in)
- Draught: 11 m (36 ft 1 in)
- Propulsion: 2 Crossley-Pielsticks pc 2 v14 on one shaft
- Speed: 15 knots (28 km/h; 17 mph)
- Complement: 56 RFA

RFA Brambleleaf (A81) was a Leaf-class support tanker of the Royal Fleet Auxiliary (RFA), the naval auxiliary fleet of the United Kingdom. Originally built as MV Hudson Deep she was chartered by the Ministry of Defence (MoD) in 1980.

== Operational history ==
In April 1982, Brambleleaf was diverted from Armilla patrol duties in the Persian Gulf for service during the Falklands Conflict. Due to damage sustained due to severe weather, Brambleleaf transferred her cargo to RFA Tidespring off South Georgia and returned to the UK for repairs during May prior to returning to the South Atlantic in June, and again in August.

On 18 November 1983, Brambleleaf sailed along with the assault ship HMS Fearless to support Operation Offcut, providing naval support for British troops in the multi-national force in Lebanon.

In 2003, Brambleleaf was one of 13 RFA ships deployed in support of the second Gulf War.

On 18 August 2009 she was towed to Ghent for scrapping.

== Battle honours ==
On 29 August 1984 Brambleleaf received her Falklands Islands 1982 Battle honour, presented by Mr A. Kemp, Director Ships and Fuel (DST (SF)).

== See also ==
- List of replenishment ships of the Royal Fleet Auxiliary
