= Leaf-class tanker =

Class of fleet support tanker chartered for service for the Royal Fleet Auxiliary

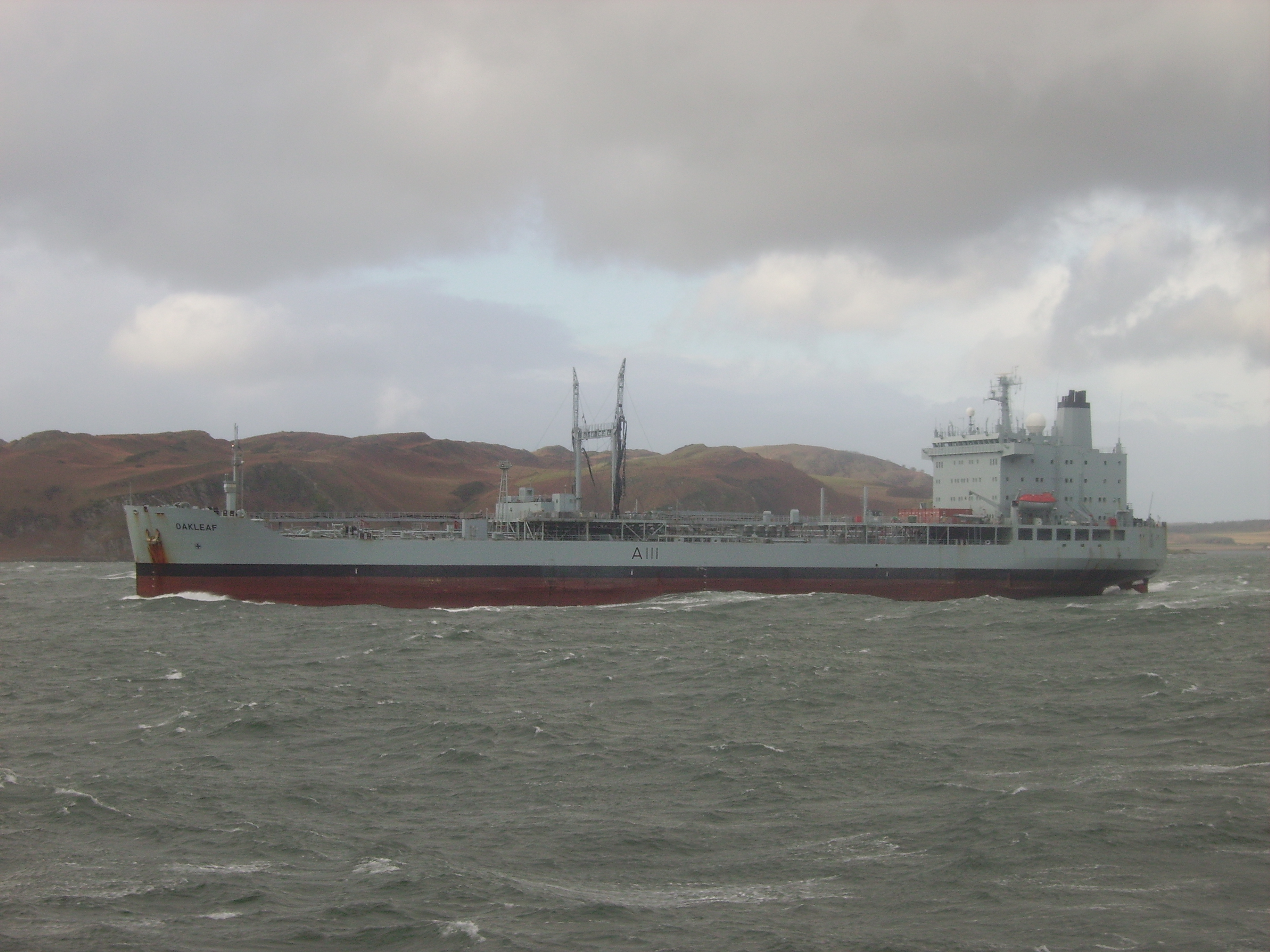
- RFA Oakleaf

Class overview
- Operators: Royal Fleet Auxiliary; Royal Australian Navy
- Succeeded by: Tide class
- Built: 1959–1981
- In commission: 1959–2016
- Completed: 13
- Scrapped: 13

General characteristics
- Type: Fleet Support Tanker
- Displacement: 17,470 – 49,377 tons
- Propulsion: 1 × 6-cylinder William Doxford & Sons marine diesel engine
- Speed: 14 knots (26 km/h; 16 mph)

The Leaf class was a class of support tanker of the Royal Fleet Auxiliary (RFA), the naval auxiliary fleet of the United Kingdom. The class is somewhat unusual as it is an amalgam of various civilian tankers chartered for naval auxiliary use and as such has included many different designs of ship. Leaf names are traditional tanker names in the RFA, and are recycled when charters end and new vessels are acquired. Thus, there have been multiple uses of the same names, sometimes also sharing a common pennant number.

The role of support tanker generally involves the bulk transport of fuel oils between distribution centres, the replenishment of front-line fleet tankers such as the Wave and Fort Victoria classes and using their replenishment at sea (RAS) abilities to allow them to directly support naval warships. For RAS, Leaf-class ships have an amidships derrick allowing a single vessel on either beam and a single point for a vessel astern.

== Ships ==
=== RFA Appleleaf ===
- (1979–1989) Appleleaf (ex-Hudson Cavalier) – A79 – 40,200 tons, to Royal Australian Navy as HMAS Westralia
- (1960–1970) Appleleaf (ex-George Lyras) – A83 – 22,980 tons

=== RFA Bayleaf ===
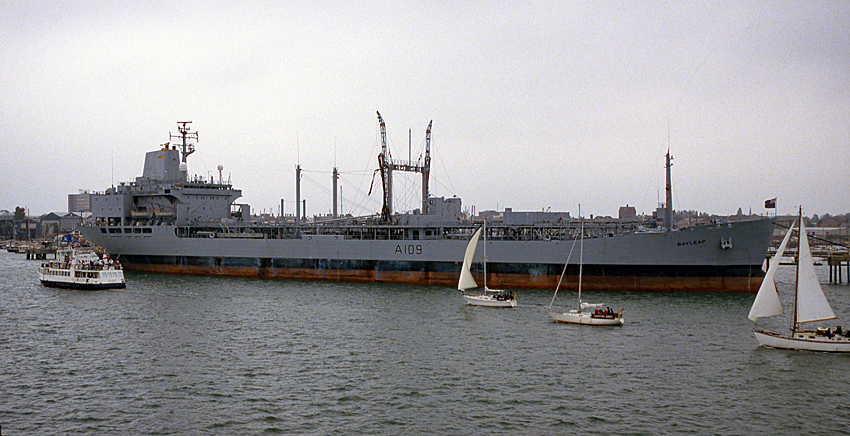
RFA Bayleaf (A109)

- (1982–2011) Bayleaf (ex-Hudson Progress) – A109 – 37,700 tons, chartered originally for Falklands War
- (1959–1973) Bayleaf (ex-London Integrity) – A79 – 17,960 tons

=== RFA Brambleleaf ===
- (1979–2009) Brambleleaf (ex-Hudson Deep) – A81 – 40,200 tons
- (1959–1972) Brambleleaf (ex-London Loyalty) – A81 – 17,960 tons

=== RFA Cherryleaf ===
- (1973–1980) Cherryleaf (ex-Overseas Adventurer) – A82 – 18,560 tons
- (1960–1966) Cherryleaf (ex-Laurelwood) – A82

=== RFA Oakleaf ===
- (1986–2009) Oakleaf (ex-Oktania) – A111 – 50,000 tons

=== RFA Orangeleaf ===
- (1984–2015) Orangeleaf (ex-Balder London) – A110 – 33,750 tons
- (1959–1978) Orangeleaf (ex-Southern Satellite) – A80 – 17,470 tons

=== RFA Pearleaf ===
- (1960–1985) Pearleaf – A77 – 25,790 tons

=== RFA Plumleaf ===
- (1960–1985) Plumleaf – A78 – 26,480 tons

== Second Leaf-class support tankers ==
One of the outcomes of the 1956 Commonwealth Prime Ministers' Conference saw the Admiralty plan to improve its ability to re-supply at sea by developing a group of ships to meet their latest requirements.

Seven tankers were bareboat chartered between 1959 and 1960. Six were initially used as freighting tankers and one was used as a replenishment tanker. An eighth tanker was later acquired in 1973, and this took on the same name and pennant number as one of the initial seven, Cherryleaf A82.

These eight vessels were all comparable to each other and were essentially bare-boat chartered as replacements for the Dale-class and Wave-class oilers.

=== Comparison ===
Second Leaf-Class Support Tankers
Tonnages
| Name | Gross register tonnage | Net register tonnage | Deadweight tonnage | Displacement (full load tonnage) |
|---|---|---|---|---|
| Appleleaf | 11,588 | 6,559 | 16,900 | 22,980 |
| Bayleaf | 12,123 | 6,940 | 17,930 | - |
| Brambleleaf | 12,123 | 7,042 | 17,960 | - |
| Cherryleaf (1953) | 12,402 | 7,338 | 18,560 | - |
| Cherryleaf (1963) | 14,027 | 7,764 | 19,770 | 18,560 |
| Orangeleaf | 12,481 | 6,949 | 17,475 | - |
| Pearleaf | 12,353 | 7,051 | 18,045 | 23,900 |
| Plumleaf | 12,692 | 7,306 | 18,562 | 24,940 |
Dimensions
| Name | Length oa | Beam | Draught | Depth |
| Appleleaf | 557ft 7in | 68ft | 29ft 10in | 38ft |
| Bayleaf | 556ft 6in | 71ft 5in | 30ft 6in | 39ft 3in |
| Brambleleaf | 556ft 8in | 71ft 4in | 30ft 6in | 39ft 3in |
| Cherryleaf (1953) | 554ft | 72ft 9in | 30ft 8in | 41ft 2in |
| Cherryleaf (1963) | 556ft 5in | 72ft | 29ft 6in | 39ft 4in |
| Orangeleaf | 559ft 4in | 72ft | 30ft 6in | 39ft 3in |
| Pearleaf | 568ft | 72ft | 30ft | 39ft |
| Plumleaf | 562ft | 72ft 1in | 31ft | 39ft 1in |

Machinery & Speed
| Name | Engine | bhp | Shaft | Speed |
|---|---|---|---|---|
| Appleleaf | 1 x NEME/Doxford 6-cylinder diesel | 6,800bhp | single shaft | 14 knots |
| Bayleaf | 1 x NEME/Doxford 6-cylinder diesel | 6,800bhp | single shaft | 14 knots |
| Brambleleaf | 1 x NEME/Doxford 6-cylinder diesel | 6,800bhp | single shaft | 14 knots |
| Orangeleaf | 1 x NEME/Doxford 6-cylinder diesel | 6,800bhp | single shaft | 15 knots |
| Cherryleaf (1953) | 1 x NEME/Doxford 6-cylinder diesel | 6,600bhp | single shaft | 13.5 knots |
| Plumleaf | 1 x NEME/Doxford 6-cylinder diesel | 9,500 bhp | single shaft | 14 knots |
| Pearleaf | 1 x Rowan/Doxford 6-cylinder diesel | 8,000bhp | single shaft | 15 knots |
| Cherryleaf (1963) | 1 x MAN 7-cylinder diesel | 8,400bhp | single shaft | 14.5 knots |

== Third Leaf-class support tankers ==
The Ministry of Defence (MoD) declared its intention to charter two laid up tankers in October 1978. They were from a four ship order by John Hudson Fuel & Shipping Ltd, at the former Cammell Laird Shipbuilders Ltd yard at Birkenhead.

Due to financial difficulties the new owners were unable to accept any ships, this occurring after three had already been laid down. Eventually the builders took over the ships and they were put up for sale or charter. The fourth ship was built later on.

A fifth vessel was later chartered, but this had been built for a Swedish company at Uddevalla, and was much different from the other four Cammell Laird builds.

=== Comparison ===
Third Leaf-Class Support Tankers
Tonnages
| Name | Gross register tonnage | Net register tonnage | Deadweight tonnage | Displacement (full load tonnage) |
|---|---|---|---|---|
| Appleleaf | 20,440 | 10,680 | 33,750 | 40,870 |
| Bayleaf | 20,086 | 11,522 | 29,999 | 37,390 |
| Brambleleaf | 20,440 | 10,680 | 33,257 | 40,870 |
| Oakleaf | 24,608 | 14,934 | 34,800 | 49,377 |
| Orangeleaf | 19,976 | 13,642 | 33,751 | 40,870 |
Dimensions
| Name | Length oa | Beam | Draught | Depth |
| Appleleaf | 170m 69cm | 25m 96cm | 11m 86cm | 15m 68cm |
| Bayleaf | 170m 69cm | 25m 94cm | 11m 4cm | 15m 68cm |
| Brambleleaf | 170m 69cm | 25m 9cm | 11m 86cm | 15m 65cm |
| Oakleaf | 173m 69cm | 32m 26cm | 10m 22cm | 14m 91cm |
| Orangeleaf | 170m 69cm | 25m 91cm | 11m 86cm | 15m 65cm |

Machinery & Speed
| Name | Engine | bhp | Shaft | Speed |
|---|---|---|---|---|
| Appleleaf | 2 x Crossley Premier-Pielstick 14-cylinder diesels | 14,000bhp | single shaft | 15 knots |
| Bayleaf | 2 x Crossley Premier-Pielstick 14-cylinder diesels | 14,000bhp | single shaft | 15 knots |
| Brambleleaf | 2 x Crossley Premier-Pielstick 14-cylinder diesels | 14,000bhp | single shaft | 15 knots |
| Orangeleaf | 2 x Crossley Premier-Pielstick 14-cylinder diesels | 14,000bhp | single shaft | 15 knots |
| Oakleaf | 1 x Uddevella/B&W 4-cylinder diesel | 12,250bhp | single shaft | 14.5 knots |

== Construction ==
=== Second Leaf class ===
Appleleaf was launched as George Lyras by the Wearside shipbuilders Bartram & Sons in September 1955 and took on by the Royal Fleet Auxiliary in April 1959. Bayleaf, Brambleleaf and Orangeleaf were all constructed by the Furness Shipbuilding Company of Stockton on Tees. Brambleleaf was laid down in May 1952 and Bayleaf in September 1953, with both vessels built for London & Overseas Freighters Ltd as London Loyalty and London Integrity respectively. Brambleleaf was taken on by the RFA in May 1959 and Bayleaf in June 1959. Orangeleaf was laid down in November 1953, built for The South Georgia Co Ltd as Southern Satellite and its RFA charter started in May 1959.

The initial Cherryleaf was finished for Molasses & General Transport Co Ltd in 1953, as Laurelwood by James Laing & Sons. Her RFA charter began in 1959 and finished in 1965. The second Cherryleaf started life as Overseas Adventurer for London & Overseas Bulk Carriers Ltd, built in 1963 by Rheinstahl Nordseewerke, Emden. Her RFA charter began in March 1973. Pairleaf was purchased by Jacobs & Partners Ltd before her launch with the RFA charter in mind and started in 1960. Plumleaf was built for Wm Cory & Son Ltd, London, as Corheath, by Blyth Shipbuilding Company, however, her charter was agreed early and she ran trials as Plumleaf before entering RFA service in 1960.

Second Leaf-Class Support Tankers
| Name | Pennant | Builder | Laid down | Launched | Completed | In RFA Service | Fate |
|---|---|---|---|---|---|---|---|
| Cherryleaf (ex-Laurelwood) | A82 | James Laing & Sons, Sunderland | - | 28 May 1953 | December 1953 | 1959 – 1965 | sold by previous owners, renamed Agios Constantinos |
| Brambleleaf (ex-London Loyalty) | A81 | Furness Shipbuilding Company, Stockton-on-Tees | 26 May 1952 | 16 April 1953 | 8 January 1954 | 22 May 1959 - April 1972 | to associates of initial owner, renamed Mayfair Loyalty |
| Bayleaf (ex-London Integrity) | A79 | Furness Shipbuilding Company, Stockton-on-Tees | 28 September 1953 | 28 October 1954 | 30 March 1955 | 16 June 1959 - March 1973 | back to initial owner as London Integrity |
| Orangeleaf (ex-Southern Satellite) | A80 | Furness Shipbuilding Company, Stockton-on-Tees | 27 November 1953 | 8 February 1955 | June 1955 | 22 May 1959 - 1978 | back to initial owner |
| Appleleaf (ex-George Lyras) | A83 | Bartram & Sons, Wearside | - | 22 April 1955 | September 1955 | 17 April 1959 - 1969 | renamed Damon |
| Pearleaf | A77 | Blythswood Shipbuilding Company Ltd, Scotstoun, Glasgow | - | 15 October 1959 | 31 January 1960 | 1960 – 9 May 1986 | sold and became a static tanker, renamed Nejmat El Petrol XIX |
| Plumleaf (ex-Corheath) | A78 | Blyth Shipbuilding & Dry Docks Company Ltd, Blyth, Northumberland | - | 29 March 1960 | August 1960 | 1960 – 1986 | to owners Blue Funnel Bulkships Ltd |
| Cherryleaf (ex-Overseas Adventurer) | A82 | Rheinstahl Nordseewerke, Emden, West Germany | - | 16 October 1962 | 21 February 1963 | 5 March 1973 - 1980 | reverted to Overseas Adventurer |

=== Third Leaf class ===
Appleleaf was launched as Hudson Cavalier was taken on by the Royal Fleet Auxiliary in February 1979, following conversion work the previous year. Brambleleaf was launched as Hudson Deep, following a refit she entered RFA service in March 1982. Orangeleaf was launched as Hudson Progress, but was sold and became Balder London. She moved aviation fuel from Ascension Island to the Falkland Islands in 1982 and after a refit entered service with the RFA in 1984. Bayleaf was laid down as Hudson Sound but was completed as Bayleaf and entered RFA service in March 1982. Oakleaf was built as Oktania at Uddevalla, Sweden and entered service with the RFA in August 1986.

Third Leaf-Class Support Tankers
| Name | Pennant | Builder | Laid down | Launched | Completed | In RFA Service | Fate |
|---|---|---|---|---|---|---|---|
| Orangeleaf (ex-Hudson Progress) | A110 | Cammell Laird, Birkenhead | - | 12 February 1975 | July 1979 | 1984 - 2015 | scrapped |
| Appleleaf (ex-Hudson Cavalier) | A79 | Cammell Laird, Birkenhead | - | 24 July 1975 | September 1979 | February 1979–1985 | lease to RAN, renamed Westralia, later sold to the Australian government |
| Brambleleaf (ex-Hudson Deep) | A81 | Cammell Laird, Birkenhead | 23 July 1974 | 22 January 1976 | February 1980 | March 1982 - 2007 | scrapped |
| Bayleaf (ex-Hudson Sound) | A109 | Cammell Laird, Birkenhead | 1 February 1975 | 27 October 1981 | April 1982 | March 1982 - 2011 | scrapped |
| Oakleaf (ex-Oktania) | A111 | Uddevallavarvet | - | 2 July 1981 | 1981 | August 1986 - 2007 | scrapped |

== Gallery ==
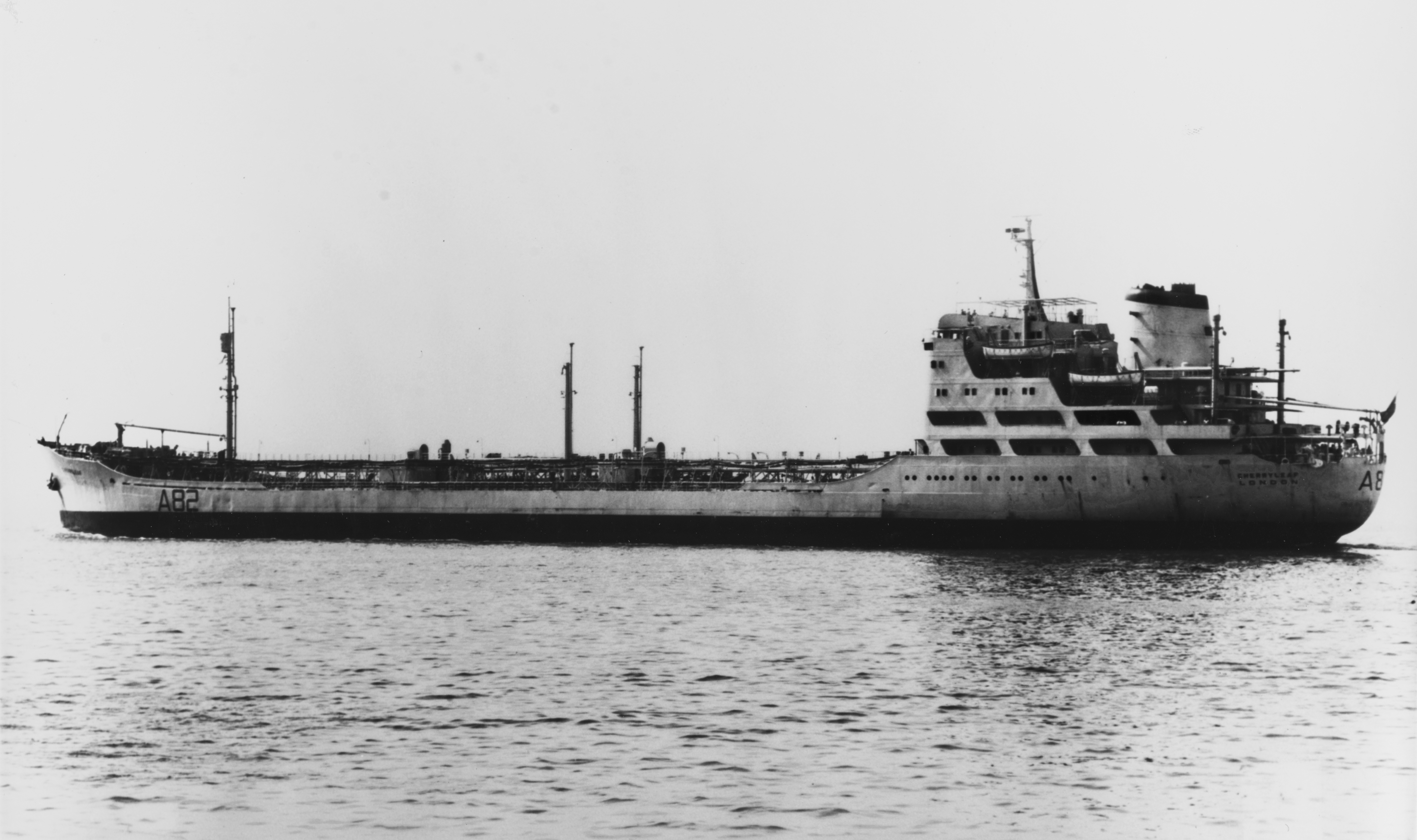
RFA Cherryleaf (A82) underway at sea in August 1975.

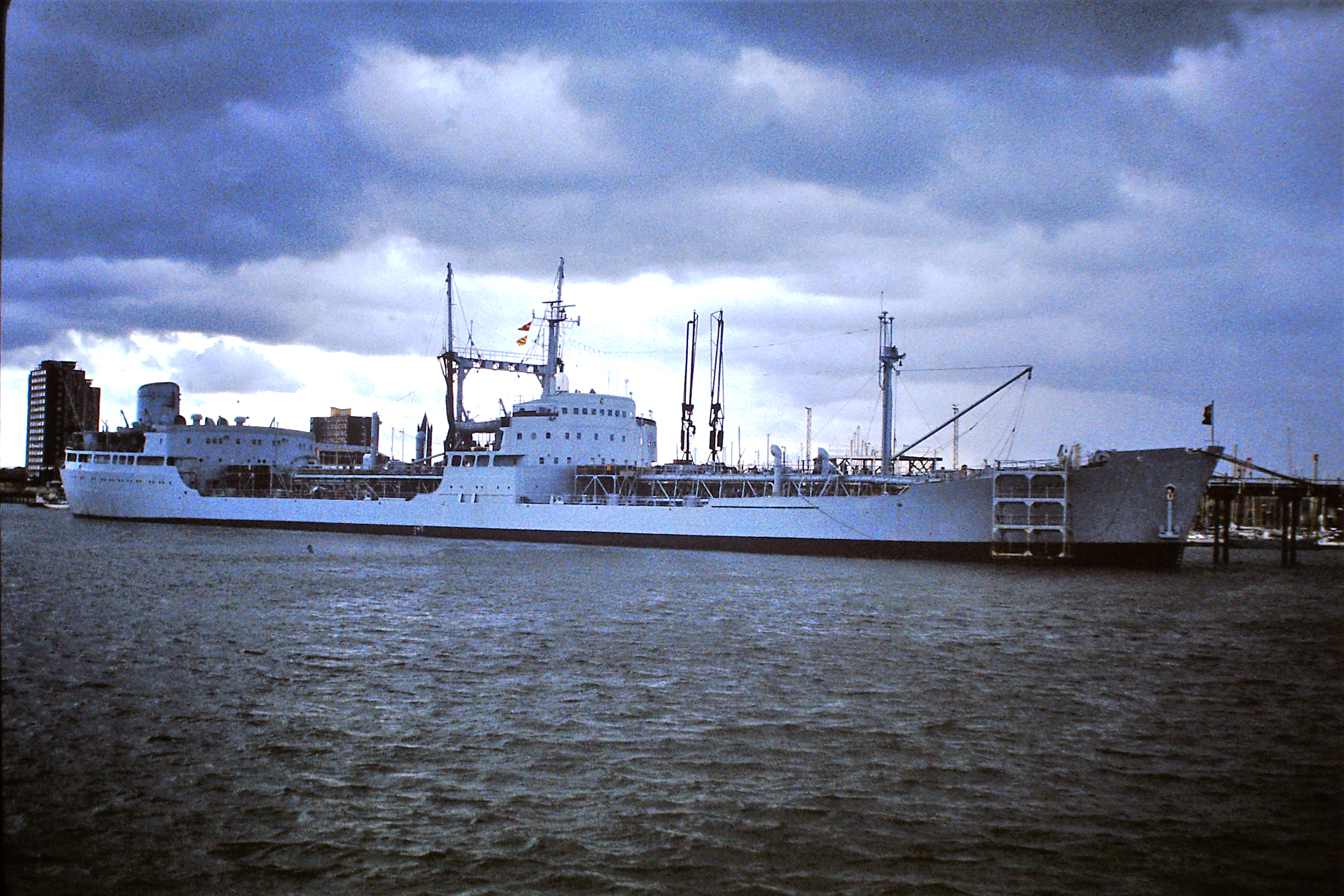
RFA Pearleaf (A77), recently returned from the Falklands Campaign with grey funnel cap and pennant number painted out. At Portsmouth Navy Day, August 1982.

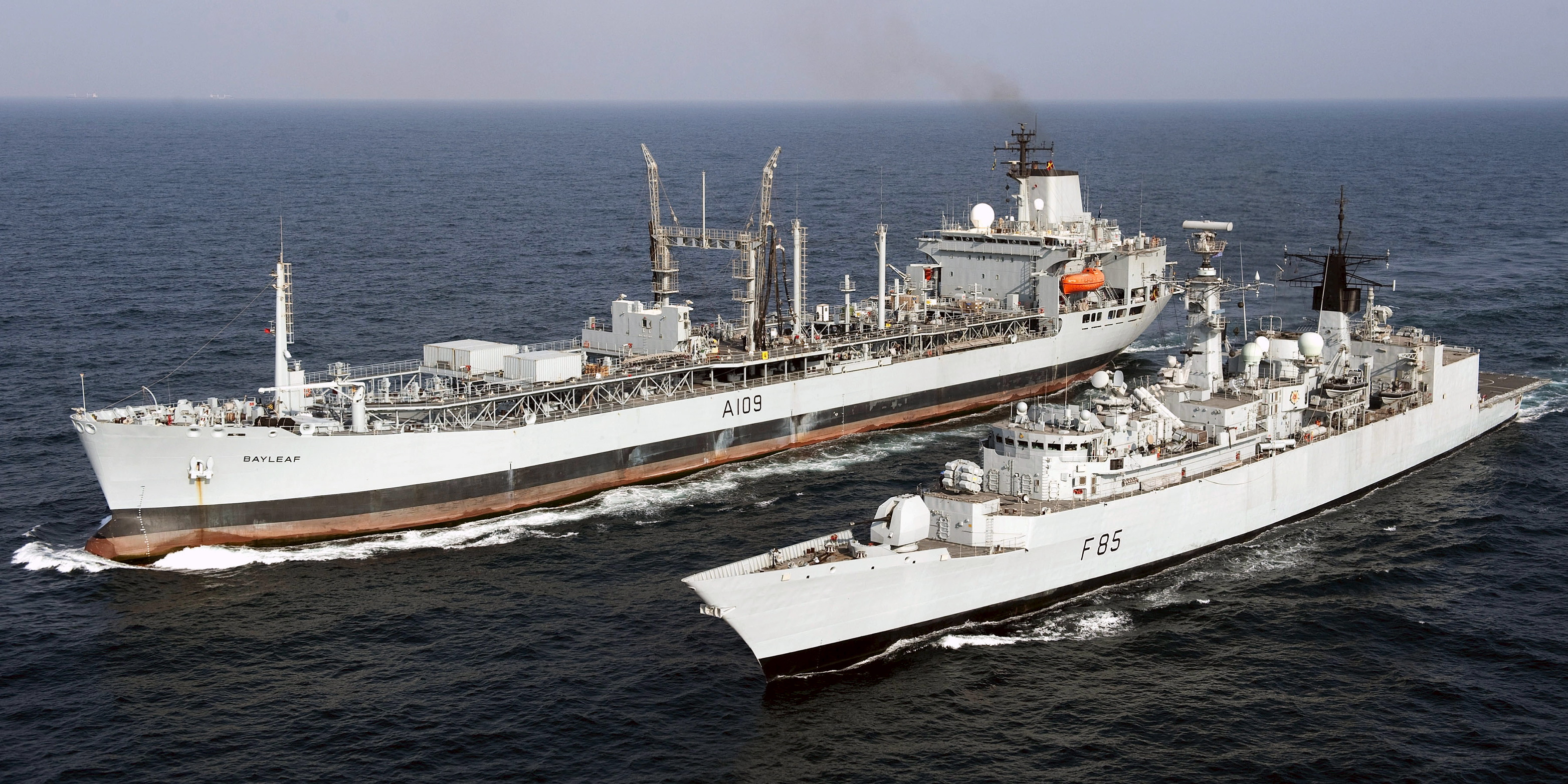
RFA Bayleaf (A109) conducts a Replenishment at Sea (RAS) with the Type 22 frigate HMS Cumberland.

== See also ==
- List of replenishment ships of the Royal Fleet Auxiliary
