= List of Royal Fleet Auxiliary ship names =

Ships of the Royal Fleet Auxiliary

Ship names alphabetically
- A; B; C; D; E; F; G; H; I; J; K; L; M; N; O; P; Q; R; S; T; U; V; W; X; Y; Z

Ships by type
- Amphibious warfare ships; Replenishment ships; Miscellaneous ships

The following is a list of Royal Fleet Auxiliary ship names by name in alphabetical order, both past and present. Many of the names have been re-used over the years and thus represent more than one ship.

== A ==
- RFA Abadol
- RFA Abbeydale
- RFA Aberfoyle
- RFA Advice
- RFA Agile
- RFA Airsprite
- RFA Aldersdale
- RFA Allegiance
- RFA Amherst
- RFA Anchorite
- RFA Ant
- RFA Antic
- RFA Antoine
- RFA Appleleaf
- RFA Aquarius
- RFA Argo
- RFA Argus
- RFA Arndale
- RFA Aro
- RFA Ashleaf
- RFA Aspenleaf
- RFA Athelstone
- RFA Attendant
- RFA Autumnleaf

== B ==
- RFA Bacchus
- RFA Barkol
- RFA Battersol
- RFA Bayleaf
- RFA Bayol
- RFA Beechleaf
- RFA Belgol
- RFA Berbice
- RFA Berta
- RFA Birchleaf
- RFA Birchol
- RFA Bishopdale
- RFA Black Dragon
- RFA Bison
- RFA Blackol
- RFA Black Ranger
- RFA Black Rover
- RFA Blackstone
- RFA Blue Ranger
- RFA Blue Rover
- RFA Boardale
- RFA Bornol
- RFA Boxleaf
- RFA Boxol
- RFA Brambleleaf
- RFA Briarleaf
- RFA British Beacon
- RFA British Lantern
- RFA British Lady
- RFA British Light
- RFA British Star
- RFA Brown Ranger
- RFA Broomdale
- RFA Burma
- RFA Bustler

== C ==
- RFA C8
- RFA C10
- RFA C11
- RFA C85
- RFA C614
- RFA C615
- RFA C616
- RFA C617
- RFA C619
- RFA C620
- RFA C621
- RFA C623
- RFA C624
- RFA C625
- RFA C633
- RFA C641
- RFA C642
- RFA C647
- RFA C648
- RFA C653
- RFA Cairndale
- RFA Califol
- RFA Canning
- RFA Cardigan Bay
- RFA Carol
- RFA Cautious
- RFA Cederdale
- RFA Cedarol
- RFA Celerol
- RFA Chattenden
- RFA Cherryleaf
- RFA City of Oxford
- RFA Crenella
- RFA Creosol
- RFA Cyclone

== D ==
- RFA Danmark
- RFA Dapper
- RFA Darkdale
- RFA Delphinula
- RFA Demeter
- RFA Denbydale
- RFA Derwentdale
- RFA Dewdale
- RFA Diligence
- RFA Dingledale
- RFA Dinsdale
- RFA Discovery I
- RFA Discovery II
- RFA Dispenser
- RFA Distol
- RFA Dockleaf
- RFA Dredgol

== E ==
- RFA Eaglesdale
- RFA Earner
- RFA Easedale
- RFA Ebonol
- RFA Echodale
- RFA Eddybay
- RFA Eddybeach
- RFA Eddycliff
- RFA Eddycove
- RFA Eddycreek
- RFA Eddyfirth
- RFA Eddymull
- RFA Eddyness
- RFA Eddyreef
- RFA Eddyrock
- RFA Elderol
- RFA Elmleaf
- RFA Elmol
- RFA Empire Ace
- RFA Empire Clyde
- RFA Empire Demon
- RFA Empire Fred
- RFA Empire Gull
- RFA Empire Netta
- RFA Empire Plane
- RFA Empire Rita
- RFA Empire Rosa
- RFA Empire Salvage
- RFA Empire Zona
- RFA Encore
- RFA Enforcer
- RFA Engadine
- RFA Ennerdale
- RFA Envoy
- RFA Eppingdale

== F ==
- RFA Fernleaf
- RFA Ferol
- RFA Fidget
- RFA Fort Austin
- RFA Fort Beauharnois
- RFA Fort Charlotte
- RFA Fort Constantine
- RFA Fort Dunvegan
- RFA Fort Duquesne
- RFA Fort George
- RFA Fort Grange
- RFA Fort Langley
- RFA Fort Rosalie
- RFA Fort Sandusky
- RFA Fort Victoria
- RFA Fortol
- RFA Francol
- RFA Freshbrook
- RFA Freshburn
- RFA Freshener
- RFA Freshet
- RFA Freshford
- RFA Freshlake
- RFA Freshmere
- RFA Freshpond
- RFA Freshpool
- RFA Freshtarn
- RFA Freshwater
- RFA Freshwell

== G ==
- RFA Gold Ranger
- RFA Gold Rover
- RFA Gray Ranger
- RFA Greenol
- RFA Green Ranger
- RFA Green Rover
- RFA Grey Rover
- RFA Growler
- RFA Gypol

== H ==
- RFA Hebe
- RFA Hickorol
- RFA Holdfast
- RFA Hollyleaf
- RFA Hughli
- RFA Hungerford
- RFA Huntball
- RFA Hesperia

== I ==
- RFA Industry
- RFA Ingeborg
- RFA Innisfree
- RFA Innisinver
- RFA Innisjura
- RFA Innisshannon
- RFA Innissulva
- RFA Innistrahull
- RFA Isla

== J ==
- RFA Jaunty
- RFA John Evelyn

== K ==
- RFA Kharki
- RFA Kimmerol
- RFA Kinbrace
- RFA Kingarth
- RFA King Salvor
- RFA Kurumba

== L ==
- RFA Larchol
- RFA Largs Bay
- RFA Laurelleaf
- RFA Limeleaf
- RFA Limol
- RFA Limpet
- RFA Lucia
- RFA Lucigen
- RFA Lyme Bay
- RFA Lyness

== M ==
- RFA Maine
- RFA Mapleleaf
- RFA Mariner
- RFA Mediator
- RFA Melita
- RFA Mercedes
- RFA Messenger
- RFA Mixol
- RFA Mollusc
- RFA Montenol
- RFA Mounts Bay

== N ==
- RFA Nasprite
- RFA Nigeria
- RFA Nimble
- RFA Nora
- RFA Northmark
- RFA Nucula

== O ==
- RFA Oakleaf
- RFA Oakol
- RFA Ocean Salvor
- RFA Olaf
- RFA Olalla
- RFA Olbury
- RFA Olcades
- RFA Oleander
- RFA Oleary
- RFA Oleaster
- RFA Oletta
- RFA Olga
- RFA Oligarch
- RFA Olinda
- RFA Oliphant
- RFA Olivet
- RFA Oliver
- RFA Olmeda
- RFA Olmos
- RFA Olna
- RFA Olwen
- RFA Olympia
- RFA Olynthus
- RFA Orangeleaf

== P ==
- RFA Palmleaf
- RFA Palmol
- RFA Pearleaf
- RFA Persol
- RFA Perthshire
- RFA Petrella
- RFA Petrobus
- RFA Petroleum
- RFA Petrelia
- RFA Petronel
- RFA Philol
- RFA Plumleaf
- RFA Polavon
- RFA Polgowan
- RFA Polmont
- RFA Polshannon
- RFA Prestol
- RFA Prince Salvor
- RFA Princetown
- RFA Prosperous
- RFA Proteus
- RFA Purfol

== R ==
- RFA Racer
- RFA Rangol
- RFA Rapidol
- RFA Red Dragon
- RFA Regent
- RFA Reindeer
- RFA Reliance
- RFA Reliant
- RFA Resource
- RFA Resurgent
- RFA Retainer
- RFA Reward
- RFA Rippledyke
- RFA Robert Dundas
- RFA Robert Middleton
- RFA Roseleaf
- RFA Rowanol
- RFA Rumol
- RFA Ruthenia

== S ==
- RFA Salviking
- RFA Salvage Duke
- RFA Salvalour
- RFA Salventure
- RFA Salvestor
- RFA Salvictor
- RFA Salvigil
- RFA Salviola
- RFA Samsonia
- RFA Santa Margherita
- RFA Saucy
- RFA Saxol
- RFA Scotol
- RFA Scottish American
- RFA Sea Centurion
- RFA Sea Chieftain
- RFA Sea Crusader
- RFA Sea Salvor
- RFA Seafox
- RFA Serbol
- RFA Servitor
- RFA Silverol
- RFA Sir Bedivere
- RFA Sir Caradoc
- RFA Sir Galahad
- RFA Sir Geraint
- RFA Sir Lamorak
- RFA Sir Lancelot
- RFA Sir Percivale
- RFA Sir Tristram
- RFA Slavol
- RFA Sobo
- RFA Sokoto
- RFA Somersby
- RFA Sotol
- RFA Spa
- RFA Spabeck
- RFA Spabrook
- RFA Spaburn
- RFA Spalake
- RFA Spapool
- RFA Sparkler
- RFA Sprucol
- RFA Steadfast
- RFA Stirling Castle
- RFA Stromness
- RFA Succour
- RFA Sunhill
- RFA Surf Patrol
- RFA Surf Pilot
- RFA Surf Pioneer
- RFA Swin

== T ==
- RFA Tarakol
- RFA Tarbatness
- RFA Teakol
- RFA Texol
- RFA Thermol
- RFA Thistle
- RFA Thornol
- RFA Thrush
- RFA Tide Austral
- RFA Tideflow
- RFA Tideforce
- RFA Tidepool
- RFA Tiderace
- RFA Tiderange
- RFA Tidereach
- RFA Tidespring
- RFA Tidesurge
- RFA Trefoil
- RFA Trinol
- RFA Turmoil
- RFA Typhoon

== U ==
- RFA Uplifter

== V ==
- RFA Victorious
- RFA Vineleaf
- RFA Viscol
- RFA Vitol
- RFA Volunteer

== W ==
- RFA War Afridi
- RFA War Bahadur
- RFA War Bharata
- RFA War Brahmin
- RFA War Diwan
- RFA War Hindoo
- RFA War Krishna
- RFA War Methar
- RFA War Nawab
- RFA War Nizam
- RFA War Pathan
- RFA War Pindari
- RFA War Sepoy
- RFA War Sirdar
- RFA War Sudra
- RFA Warden
- RFA Wave Baron
- RFA Wave Chief
- RFA Wave Commander
- RFA Wave Conqueror
- RFA Wave Duke
- RFA Wave Emperor
- RFA Wave Governor
- RFA Wave King
- RFA Wave Knight
- RFA Wave Laird
- RFA Wave Liberator
- RFA Wave Master
- RFA Wave Monarch
- RFA Wave Premier
- RFA Wave Prince
- RFA Wave Protector
- RFA Wave Regent
- RFA Wave Ruler
- RFA Wave Sovereign
- RFA Wave Victor
- RFA William Scoresby
