= List of miscellaneous ships of the Royal Fleet Auxiliary =

Ships of the Royal Fleet Auxiliary

Ship names alphabetically
- A; B; C; D; E; F; G; H; I; J; K; L; M; N; O; P; Q; R; S; T; U; V; W; X; Y; Z

Ships by type
- Amphibious warfare ships; Replenishment ships; Miscellaneous ships

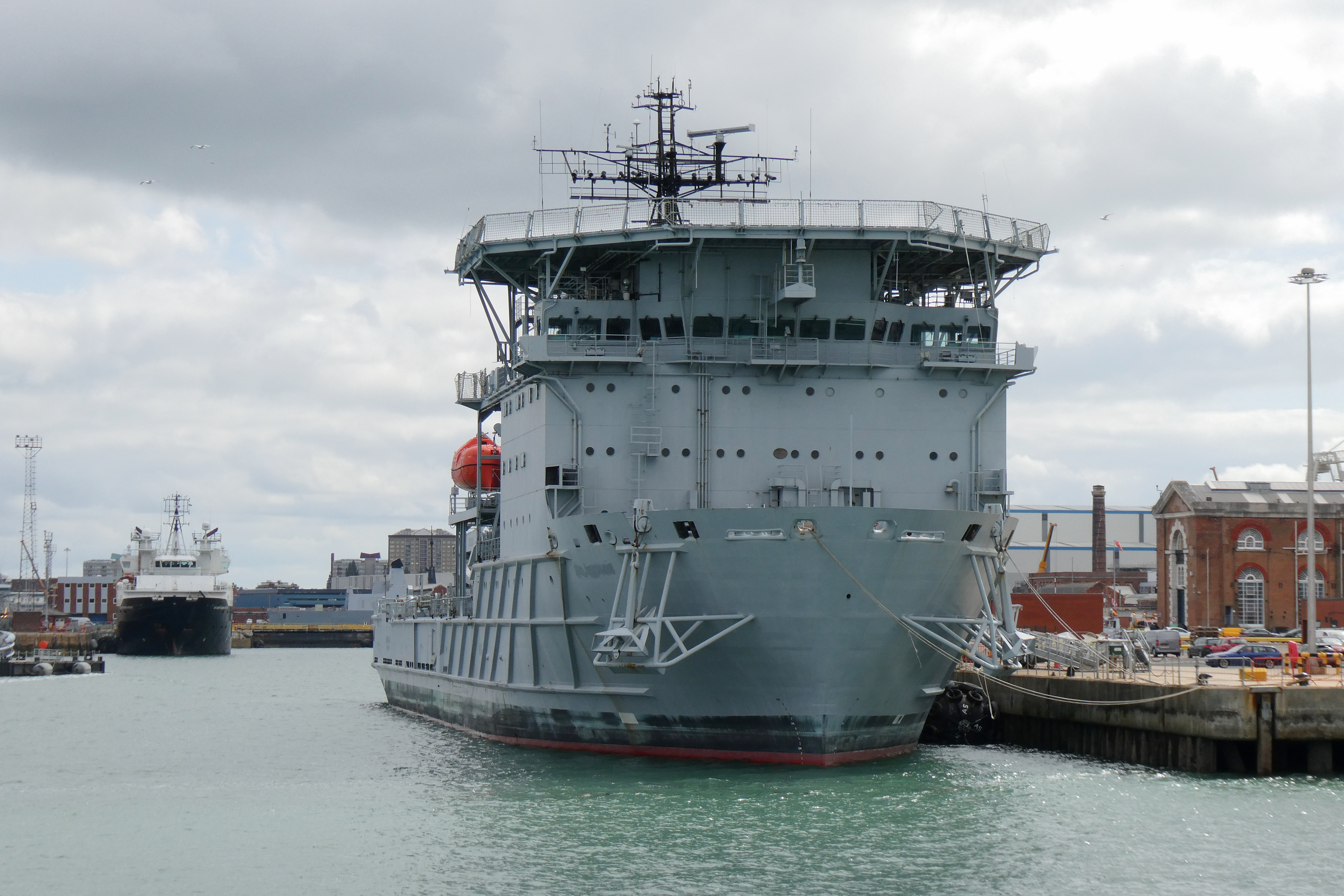
Forward repair ship RFA Diligence alongside at HMNB Portsmouth

This is a list of miscellaneous ships of the Royal Fleet Auxiliary (RFA), the naval auxiliary fleet of the United Kingdom. As of 2026, only one such vessel is in active service with the RFA.

== Active ==
- Multi-Role Ocean Surveillance Ship
  - RFA Proteus (K60)

== Decommissioned ==
=== Aviation Support and Primary Casualty Reception Ship ===
Originally constructed as a container vessel for commercial proprietors, she was commandeered for duty during the Falklands Conflict in 1982. Following this, she was acquired and modified for her new function as an aviation support ship. After undergoing comprehensive trials, she commenced service, taking the place of the smaller RFA Engadine. She was deemed "usafe to sail" as of 2025 and retired from service. She has been in commission since 1988 (and still technically is as of March 2026, even though preparations are taking place for her scrapping).

- RFA Argus (A135)

=== Autonomous Minehunting Mothership ===
The vessel commenced its existence as the offshore support ship MV Island Crown; however, in 2023, it was acquired by the Ministry of Defence and subsequently underwent a conversion at HMNB Devonport to adapt it for the specific purpose of supporting mine hunting. She transferred from the RFA to the Royal Navy in 2025. She was in RFA commission from 11 April 2024 (entry into RFA service) to 21 July 2025 (entry into RN service).

- RFA Stirling Castle (M01)

=== Forward Repair Ship ===
Diligence was initially chartered for service during the Falklands War. She became a fleet maintenance vessel and was used in multiple forward deployments, including during both Gulf War and Iraq War. She was in commission 1984-2016. She was scrapped in 2024.

- RFA Diligence (A132)

=== Aviation Support / Training Ship ===
In 1964 a request was made for a helicopter support vessel designed to transport either 3 x Westland Wessex or 4 x Westland Wasp helicopters, along with the essential spare parts and equipment required for secondary line maintenance. Engadine was in commission 1967-1989. She was scrapped 1996.

- RFA Engadine (K08)

=== Aviation Support Ship ===
Reliant was called into service during the Falklands Conflict in 1982, and the subsequent year, she was contracted for conversion into an aviation support vessel, becoming fully outfitted for her specialised function as an Aviation Support Ship. She was in commission 1983-1986. After that she was sold back to commercial use. She was scrapped 1998.

- RFA Reliant (A131)

=== Salvage Vessels ===
==== King Salvor class ====
The King Salvor-class salvage vessels were a series of twelve ocean salvage vessels operated by the RFA.

- RFA King Salvor (A291)
- RFA Salviking
- RFA Ocean Salvor (A492)
- RFA Prince Salvor (A292)
- RFA Salvage Duke
- RFA Salvalour (A494)
- RFA Salventure
- RFA Salvestor (A499)
- RFA Salvictor (A500)
- RFA Salvigil (A501)
- RFA Salviola (A502)
- RFA Sea Salvor (A503)

=== Hospital Ships ===
- RFA Berbice
- RFA Maine (1887) She was in RFA commission from 1905 (the formation of the RFA) to June 1914 when she ran aground and was wrecked. In July 1914 the wreck was sold for scrap.
- RFA Maine (1905) She was in commission 1913-1916 (before the June 1914 loss of the first RFA Maine (RFA Maine (1887)), this second RFA Maine (RFA Maine (1905)) was known as RFA Mediator and it was renamed to become the second ship of the name RFA Maine after the June 1914 loss of the first RFA Maine). After decommissioning she was sold. She was scrapped 1932.
- RFA Maine (1902) She was in RFA commission 1922-1947 (before RFA she was known as Panama). She was scrapped 1948.
- RFA Maine (1924) She entered RFA commission in 1947 as RFA Empire Clyde, was renamed RFA Maine in 1948 and was decommissioned 1954. She was scrapped 1954.
