= List of amphibious warfare ships of the Royal Fleet Auxiliary =

Ships of the Royal Fleet Auxiliary

Ship names alphabetically
- A; B; C; D; E; F; G; H; I; J; K; L; M; N; O; P; Q; R; S; T; U; V; W; X; Y; Z

Ships by type
- Amphibious warfare ships; Replenishment ships; Miscellaneous ships

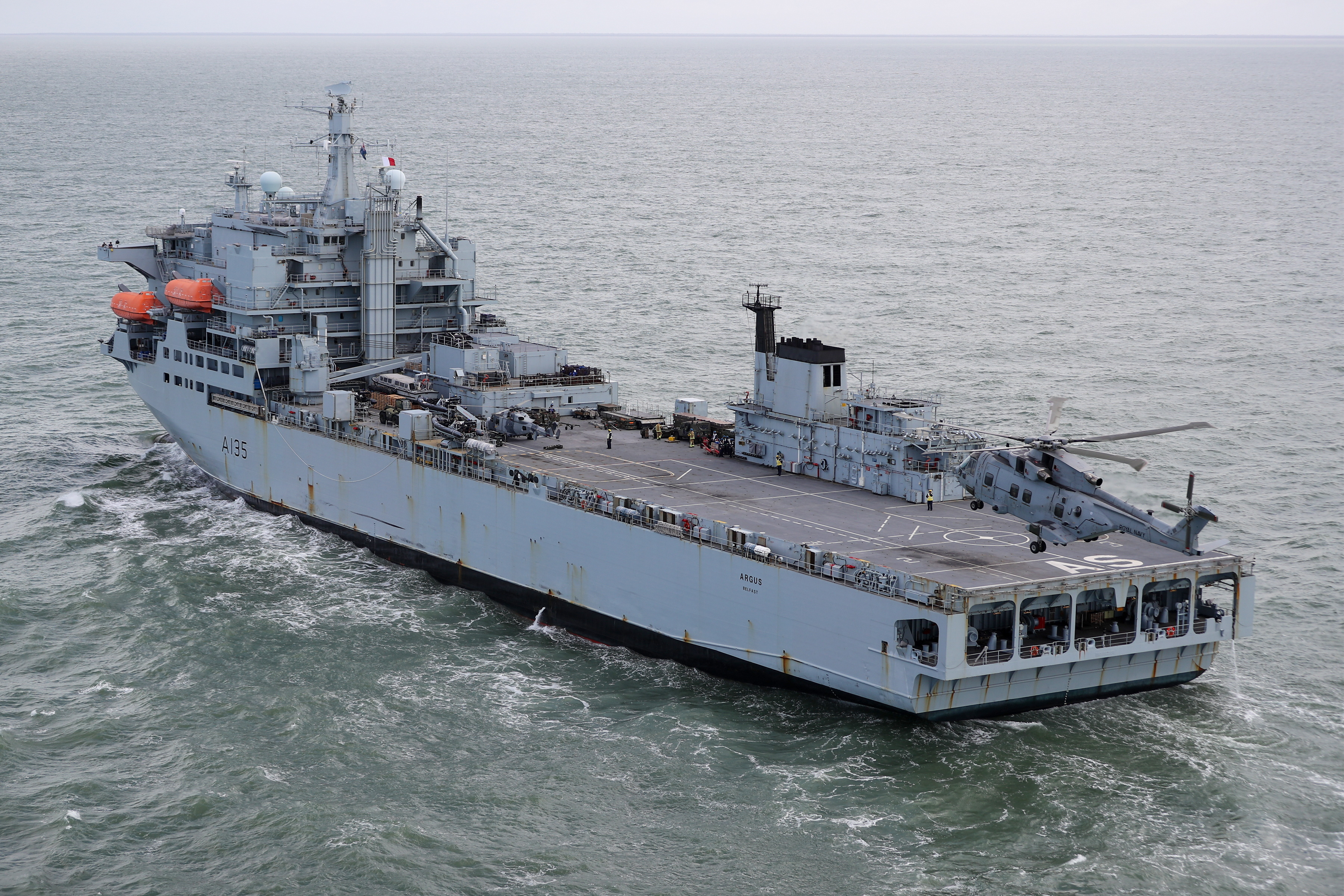
AgustaWestland Merlin from 845 Naval Air Squadron recovering to the flight deck of RFA Argus

This is a list of amphibious warfare ships of the Royal Fleet Auxiliary, the naval auxiliary fleet of the United Kingdom.

The list is divided into two parts: the first part is Active and includes current ships, whereas the second part is Out of service and encompasses all ships that have been previously operated.

Following the conclusion of the Second World War, the Royal Navy implemented a streamlined pennant number system. Within this system the letter L was designated for amphibious warfare vessels, while A was assigned to auxiliaries, which are ships belonging to the Royal Fleet Auxiliary.

During the 1940s and 1950s, the Royal Fleet Auxiliary was involved in amphibious support roles through the use of auxiliary logistics ships. From the 1960s to the 2000s, the RFA operated the Landing Ship Logistics of the Round Table-class, also known as the Sir Lancelot class, marking the introduction of the first dedicated RFA amphibious warfare vessels. Since 1988, RFA Argus provided aviation and medical support for amphibious forces. However, she was taken out of service in 2025/26.

From 2006 to the present, the RFA has been operating the Bay-class dock landing ships, which serves as core modern amphibious lift ships. Looking ahead to the 2030s, there are plans to acquire future ATS-class amphibious warfare ships in conjunction with the Royal Netherlands Navy. These may be operated by the Royal Navy or the Royal Fleet Auxiliary.

== Active ==
There is a single type of amphibious warfare ship currently in service with the RFA as of early-2026, totalling three Bay-class landing ships.

Consisting of three vessels (Lyme Bay, Mounts Bay and Cardigan Bay), the function of the Bay Class ships is to transfer embarked troops and armoured vehicles from ship to shore utilising Landing craft vehicle personnel (LCVP) and Landing craft utility (LCU) vessels. These ships are capable of operating in very severe weather conditions to assist amphibious operations. The three Bay class ships are projected to be removed from service by 2032.

List of current amphibious warfare ships of the Royal Fleet Auxiliary
Dock landing ships
Class / Type	Ship	Pennant No.	Image	In service	Out of service	Service life	Status	Ref.
Bay-class dock landing ship	Lyme Bay	L3007		26 November 2007	—	18 years, 320 days	Active as of early 2026	
Bay-class dock landing ship	Cardigan Bay	L3009		18 December 2006	—	19 years, 298 days	Reported in refit as of April 2026	
Bay-class dock landing ship	Mounts Bay	L3008		13 July 2006	—	20 years, 91 days	Returning to service with full crew as of April 2026	

== Out of service ==
=== Dock landing ships ===
Former amphibious warfare ship of the Royal Fleet Auxiliary now in service with the Royal Australian Navy (RAN)
Dock landing ships
Class / Type	Ship	Pennant No.	Image	In service	Out of service	Service life	Status	Ref.
Bay-class dock landing ship	Largs Bay	L3006		17 December 2006	19 October 2011	4 years, 306 days	Sold to RAN, currently in RAN service as HMAS Choules	

=== Aviation support/casualty receiving ship ===
Former Aviation support/casualty receiving ship of the Royal Fleet Auxiliary
Littoral strike ship
Class / Type	Ship	Pennant No.	Image	In service	Out of service	Service life	Status	Ref.
Aviation support/casualty receiving ship	RFA Argus	A135		1 June 1988	2025	37 years	To be sold for breaking up	

=== Landing ship logistics ===
==== Round table class ====
The Round Table-class landing ship logistics were a class of six ships, all of which would be named after Knights of the Round Table.

Former Landing ship logistics of the Royal Fleet Auxiliary
Round table class
Class / Type	Ship	Pennant No.	Image	In service	Out of service	Service life	Status	Ref.
Round Table-class landing ship logistics	Sir Lancelot	L3029		16 January 1964	31 March 1989	25 years, 74 days	Scrapped 2008	
Round Table-class landing ship logistics	Sir Galahad (I)	L3005		17 December 1966	8 June 1982	15 years, 173 days	Destroyed during the Falklands War - Sunk as a war grave in 1982	
Round Table-class landing ship logistics	Sir Geraint	L3027		1 January 1970	1 May 2003	33 years, 158 days	Scrapped in India 12 December 2005	
Round Table-class landing ship logistics	Sir Bedivere	L3004		14 January 1970	18 February 2008	38 years, 35 days	Sold to the Brazilian Navy as Almirante Saboia, 2008. As of March 2026, she is actively sailing in Brazilian service.	
Round Table-class landing ship logistics	Sir Tristram	L3502		30 January 1970	16 December 2005	35 years, 320 days	Static training ship for Maritime Special Forces	
Round Table-class landing ship logistics	Sir Percivale	L3036		6 March 1970	17 August 2004	34 years, 164 days	Broken up 2009	
Round Table-class landing ship logistics	Modified Round table class							
Round Table-class landing ship logistics	Sir Galahad (II)	L3005		25 November 1987	20 July 2007	19 years, 237 days	Sold to the Brazilian Navy as Garcia D’Avila, 2007. Sunk as target 2024.	
After the loss of RFA Sir Galahad and the damage to RFA Sir Tristam during the Falklands War, two commercial Roll-on/roll-off ferries were temporarily chartered
Former Chartered Landing ship logistics of the Royal Fleet Auxiliary
Class / Type	Ship	Pennant No.	Image	In service	Out of service	Service life	Status	Ref.
roll-on/roll-off ferry	Sir Caradoc	L3522		17 March 1983	29 June 1988	5 years, 104 days	Returned to owners. As of 2026 actively sailing as Royal Nusantara in Indonesia.	
roll-on/roll-off ferry	Sir Lamorak	L3532	no image	11 March 1983	20 January 1986	2 years, 315 days	Returned to owners. As of 2026, actively sailing as Fjärdvägen in Finland.	

=== Strategic Sealift ===
==== Strategic Sealift Ro/Ro ====
Two commercial Ro/Ro vessels bareboat chartered for additional freight carrying capacity with formation of the Joint Rapid Deployment Force (JRDF).

Former strategic sealift ships of the Royal Fleet Auxiliary
Strategic Sealift Ro-Ro
Class / Type	Ship	Pennant No.	Image	In service	Out of service	Service life	Status	Ref.
Strategic Sealift Ro-Ro	RFA Sea Crusader (A96)	A96	No image	10 October 1996	7 August 2003	6 years, 301 days	Returned to owners. As of 2026 she is actively sailing as Jabal Ali 11.	
Strategic Sealift Ro-Ro	RFA Sea Centurion (A98)	A98		18 October 1998	25 July 2002	3 years, 280 days	Returned to owners. As of 2026 she is actively sailing as MSC Bridge.	

=== Landing Ship Tank ===
Originally operated by the Royal Navy, in 1956 she was transferred to civilian administration as SS Empire Gull. She joined the RFA in 1970 and was in service until 1978, being the only Landing Ship Tank operated as a Royal Fleet Auxiliary.

Former landing ship tank of the Royal Fleet Auxiliary
Landing Ship Tank
Class / Type	Ship	Pennant No.	Image	In service	Out of service	Service life	Status	Ref.
Landing Ship, Tank	RFA Empire Gull	-		3 February 1970	19 October 1978	8 years, 258 days	Scrapped 1980	

=== Landing Ship Gantry ===
==== Dale class ====
Three Dale-class tankers were converted into Landing Ship Gantry’s and were then reconverted back into tankers at the end of the Second World War.

Former landing ship gantrys of the Royal Fleet Auxiliary
Landing Ship Gantry
Class / Type	Ship	Pennant No.	Image	In service	Out of service	Service life	Status	Ref.
Landing Ship Gantry	Derwentdale	A114	No image	30 August 1941 (converted to LSG 1943)	19 May 1959 (converted back to tanker 1946)	17 years, 262 days	Sold commercially. Scrapped 1966.	
Landing Ship Gantry	Dewdale	A151	No image	14 June 1941 (converted to LSG 1943)	6 May 1959 (converted back to tanker 1947)	17 years, 326 days	Broken up 1959	
Landing Ship Gantry	Ennerdale	A173		11 July 1941 (converted to LSG 1943)	1 March 1958 (converted back to tanker 1946)	16 years, 233 days	Broken up 1959–60	

== See also ==
=== Roles and types ===
- Dock landing ship
- Landing Ship Logistics
- Landing Ship, Tank
- Amphibious transport dock

=== Future ===
- Multi-role strike ship (MRSS)
