= RFA Tidespring (A75) =

1963 Tide-class replenishment oiler of the Royal Fleet Auxiliary

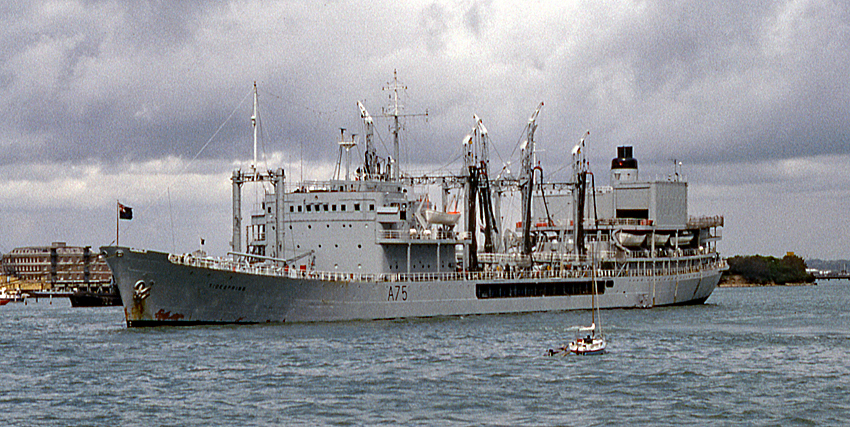
- A75 Tidespring moored at Gosport in 1979

History

United Kingdom
- Name: RFA Tidespring
- Ordered: 28 February 1961
- Builder: Hawthorn Leslie and Company
- Yard number: 752
- Laid down: 24 July 1961
- Launched: 3 May 1962
- In service: 18 January 1963
- Out of service: 18 December 1991
- Identification: IMO number: 5361033; Callsign: GJNC; Pennant number: A75; Deck code: TS
- Honours and awards: Falkland Islands 1982
- Fate: Scrapped 1992
- Badge

General characteristics
- Class & type: Tide-class replenishment oiler
- Tonnage: 14,130 GRT; 7,411 NRT; 17,400 DWT
- Displacement: 27,400 long tons (27,840 t)
- Length: 583 ft 8 in (177.90 m)
- Beam: 71 ft 3 in (21.72 m)
- Draught: 32 ft 1 in (9.78 m)
- Depth: 40 ft 6 in (12.34 m)
- Installed power: 2 × Foster Wheeler watertube steam boilers; 15,000 shaft horsepower (11,000 kilowatts)
- Propulsion: 2 × Hawthorn Leslie/Pametrada geared turbines, double reduction gearbox; single shaft
- Speed: 17 knots (20 mph; 31 km/h)
- Complement: 110 - plus embarked RN flight party
- Aircraft carried: 3 × Westland Wessex helicopters
- Aviation facilities: Helicopter deck, hangar

Service record
- Operations: Operation Magister; Operation Corporate; Operation Paraquet

RFA Tidespring (A75) was a Tide-class replenishment oiler of the Royal Fleet Auxiliary. As a replenishment oiler, her main purpose was to refuel other ships. The ship had a long career in the RFA, entering service in the early 1960s, and finally being decommissioned in 1991.

Tidespring took part in the Falklands War, particularly in the recapture of South Georgia. At the time, she was carrying "M" Company of 42 Commando Royal Marines. The ship accommodated prisoners of war taken during operations. The Falklands conflict provided a reprieve of ten years for Tidespring which had been due to decommission in 1982.

== Design and construction ==
Tidespring had a normal complement consisting of 110 Royal Fleet Auxiliary personnel with provision for up to twenty-four Royal Navy personnel. She was designed with abeam replenishment at sea rigs, which had automatic tensioning winches and she had an astern fuelling rig. Tidespring was also fitted with a single spot 50 x 70 ft helicopter deck, designed to be capable of handling the Royal Navy Westland Wessex helicopters used at the time. She had hangar facilities for a single helicopter and could support aviation refuelling. The ship was built to carry 9,500 tons of Furnace Fuel Oil, 5,500 tons of diesel oil and 2,000 tons of avcat and the forward hold could take dry cargo.

The construction of Tidespring was carried out by the shipbuilder Hawthorn Leslie, at Hebburn. The ship was laid down on 24 July 1961 and launched the following year on 3 May 1962. She displaced, fully loaded, 27,400 tons, was just under 584 ft in overall length and was capable of 17 knots.

== Operational history ==
Tidespring was completed and entered service with the Royal Fleet Auxiliary on 18 January 1963, replacing the fleet support tanker Wave Master.

=== Task Group 318 ===
Tidespring was included in Task Group 318, the Aden Task Force, which was formed to secure the British military withdrawal from the State of Aden, and also known as Operation Magister, between 11 October 1967 and 25 January 1968. Along with Tidespring, the RFA contingent within the group were sister ship Tideflow, fast fleet tanker Olna, the mobile bulk tanker Dewdale, the support tanker Appleleaf, two armament support ships Retainer and Resurgent, the fleet stores ship Stromness, an air stores support ship Reliant and the armament stores carrier Fort Sandusky. The Royal Navy warships consisted four aircraft carriers, one destroyer, two assault landing ships and five Landing Ship Tanks, along with one submarine.

=== Exercise Coral Sands ===
From 20 September until 13 October 1968, Tidespring was deployed participating in Exercise Coral Sands which took place in the Solomon Sea, the Coral Sea and Shoalwater Bay, together with RFAs Olna, the ammunition, explosives and stores supply ship Regent and the fleet stores ship Tarbatness, and alongside the Royal Navy’s aircraft carriers Albion and Hermes, the destroyers Glamorgan and Fife, the amphibious warfare ship Intrepid and the heavy repair ship Triumph, the Royal Australian Navy’s aircraft carrier Sydney, the replenishment oiler Supply and the Escort Maintenance ship Stalwart, and the Royal New Zealand Navy’s frigate Waikato.

=== Task Group 317.1 ===
On 8 June 1973, along with Regent, Tidespring deployed from HMNB Portsmouth as part of Task Group 317.1, the first Group deployment, led by its Flagship the cruiser Tiger. The group also included the Leander-class frigates Dido and Hermione, and the Rothesay-class frigate Rhyl. The Task Group arrived back to the United Kingdom on 21 December.

=== Task Group 317.3 ===
She departed the United Kingdom as part of Task Group 317.3 on 22 July 1975 along with RFAs Gold Rover and Tarbatness to provide auxiliary support for the County-class guided missile destroyer Glamorgan, the group flagship. The 8th Frigate Squadron provided the rest of the Royal Navy warships with the Leander-class frigate Ajax, the Rothesay-class frigates Berwick, Plymouth and the lead ship Rothesay. The Task Group arrived back to the United Kingdom on 14 April 1976.

=== Silver Jubilee Fleet Review ===
On 25 June 1977 Tidespring was present at the Silver Jubilee Fleet Review, with eight other RFA vessels.

=== Task Group 317.7 ===
On 31 May 1978, along with RFA’s Green Rover and Stromness, she departed HMNB Portsmouth involved in Task Group 317.7, led by the Royal Navy’s converted helicopter cruiser Blake, the task group’s flagship, and accompanied by the Royal Navy's Leander-class frigate Juno. The deployment was for six and half months, covering the Pacific, the Atlantic and the Caribbean. Completing the group from HMNB Devonport were the Amazon-class frigate Ambuscade and the Leander-class frigates Hermione and name ship Leander.

While on this deployment Tidespring visited Naval Base San Diego, the United States Navy’s facility at San Diego, California, on 28 August. She returned to the United Kingdom for 13 December 1978.

=== Operation Paraquet ===
Tidespring was involved with the operation to recapture the island of South Georgia from Argentine military control, designated Operation Paraquet, during the early stages of the Falklands War. She was part of the task force led by the destroyer Antrim, which also included two frigates: Plymouth and Brilliant, plus the Royal Navy’s ice patrol vessel Endurance.

Two Westland Wessex HU.5 troop transporter helicopters, serial nos. XT464 and XT473, of 845 Naval Air Squadron, ‘C’ Flight, embarked on 11 April 1982. On 22 April both helicopters were lost when attempting to airlift D Squadron, 22 Special Air Service (SAS), from the Fortuna Glacier.

The island was restored to British control on 25 April and Tidespring sailed for Ascension Island on 2 May with forty civilians from Leith Harbour and 150 Argentine POWs embarked.

=== Operation Matchstick ===
In 1983, between 1 and 4 February, Tidespring was involved in Operation Matchstick. This was an understated objective to prevent any attempt by Argentina to return to Thule Island, the southernmost of the South Sandwich Islands, in the South Atlantic. Crews from the Leander-class frigate Ariadne and Tidespring demolished the buildings of the former base, but left a flagpole, two weather beacons, and a fully provisioned hut.

=== Armilla patrol ===
November 1986 saw Tidespring deployed to the Persian Gulf on the Armilla Patrol, the Royal Navy's permanent presence in the area at the time. She operated with the Royal Navy's Type 42 destroyer Cardiff, along with the lead ship of her class, the Type 22 frigate Broadsword, as well as the United States Navy’s aircraft carrier Enterprise. Between October and December 1987 a Westland Lynx helicopter detachment of 241 Flight parented by 815 Naval Air Squadron, from the destroyer Birmingham, was embarked in Tidespring. Her Armilla patrol deployment ended in 1988.

=== Operation Eldorado ===
From 1 June through to August 1988 she was part of Operation Eldorado, a safety deployment and she stood by off the coast of Monrovia, the capital and largest city of Liberia, to assist with any evacuation required during the First Liberian Civil War, once again supporting the frigate Broadsword, as well as the Leander-class frigate Phoebe.

== Decommissioning and fate ==
By December 1991 she was laid up at Portsmouth and was eventually towed out on 20 March 1992 for the breakers, arriving at the Alang Ship Breaking Yard, India, for demolition on 2 July 1992.

== Battle honours ==
On 4 October 1984 Tidespring received her Falkland Islands 1982 Battle honour, presented by Captain Cyril Gordon Butterworth, Chief Marine Superintendent (CMS).
