= A501 =

A501 may refer to:

- A501 RAM/RTC expansion, a computer peripheral
- A501 road (Great Britain), a part of the Inner Ring Road, London
- A501 steel
- RFA Salvigil (A501), a ship
