= RFA Tidespring =

RFA Tidespring may refer to the following ships of the Royal Fleet Auxiliary, the naval auxiliary fleet of the United Kingdom:

- RFA Tidespring (A75), Tide-class replenishment oiler of the Royal Fleet Auxiliary, in service 1963–1991
- RFA Tidespring (A136), Tide-class tanker of the Royal Fleet Auxiliary in service since 2017
