= RFA Tidesurge =

RFA Tidesurge may refer to the following ships of the Royal Fleet Auxiliary, the naval auxiliary fleet of the United Kingdom:

- RFA Tidesurge (A98), a Tide-class replenishment oiler of the Royal Fleet Auxiliary, in service 1955–1976.
- RFA Tidesurge (A138), a Tide-class tanker of the Royal Fleet Auxiliary, in service from 2019.
