= SS Empire Clyde =

Two ships were named Empire Clyde:

- SS Empire Clyde (1919)
- SS Empire Clyde (1924)
