= RFA Maine =

There have been five British Royal Fleet Auxiliary hospital ships named RFA Maine.

- RFA Maine (1887), served during the Second Boer War (1899–1902) and was wrecked in 1914 off the Isle of Mull.
- RFA Maine (1905), was purchased in 1913, and named RFA Mediator. Renamed in 1914 after the loss of the first RFA Maine, the ship was sold back to her previous owners in 1916. She was scrapped 1932.
- RFA Maine (1902), was purchased in 1920 and served in the Mediterranean Fleet, on the China Station, and was based at Alexandria, Egypt, during World War II. She was decommissioned in 1947, and broken up 1948.
- RFA Maine (1924), was an Italian passenger ship captured in 1941. Renamed Empire Clyde and operated by the British Army during World War II, she was transferred to the Royal Navy in 1945. Renamed RFA Maine in 1948 she served in the Korean War and was scrapped in 1954.
- RFA Maine (1952) was ordered by the British government in 1952 and laid down on the River Clyde by Barclay, Curle & Sons. The order was later cancelled.
