= RFA Tiderace =

RFA Tiderace may refer to the following ships of the Royal Fleet Auxiliary, the naval auxiliary fleet of the United Kingdom:

- RFA Tideflow (A97), Tide-class replenishment oiler of the Royal Fleet Auxiliary, originally named Tiderace, in service 1956–1975;
- RFA Tiderace (A137), a Tide-class tanker of the Royal Fleet Auxiliary launched in 2015
