= RFA Turmoil =

Two ships of the Royal Fleet Auxiliary have borne the name RFA Turmoil:

- RFA Turmoil (1917) was a harbour tanker launched in 1917 and sold in 1935
- RFA Turmoil (A111) was a Bustler-class tug launched in 1945 as HMS Turmoil. She was chartered out into civilian service in 1946 and became a RFA in 1957. She was sold in 1965 into civilian service
