= RFA Fort Rosalie =

Two ships of the Royal Fleet Auxiliary have borne the name RFA Fort Rosalie:

- RFA Fort Rosalie (A186) was a stores ship launched in 1944 and scrapped in 1973
- RFA Fort Rosalie (A385) is a Fort Rosalie-class replenishment ship, initially launched in 1976 as RFA Fort Grange but renamed Fort Rosalie in 2000. She is in service as of 2009.
