= RFA Olynthus =

Two ships of the Royal Fleet Auxiliary (RFA) have borne the name RFA Olynthus:

- RFA Olynthus was an oiler launched in 1918 as RFA British Star and was in service with the RFA from March 1918 through to 1949. She was renamed Olynthus in 1937.
- RFA Olynthus (A122) was a Ol-class fast fleet tanker launched in 1964, the lead ship of her class. She was renamed Olwen in 1967 to avoid confusion with the Oberon-class submarine, HMS Olympus.
