= RFA Birchol =

Two ships of the Royal Fleet Auxiliary (RFA) have borne the name RFA Birchol:

- RFA Birchol (X07) was a harbour oiler launched in 1917. She was declared a total loss having run aground during fog in the Hebrides, in November 1939.
- RFA Birchol (A127) was a Ol-class coastal tanker launched in 1946. She served with the Royal Fleet Auxiliary until being taken out of service in February 1965 and was eventually scrapped four years later.
