= RFA War Pathan =

1923 War-class tanker of the British Royal Fleet Auxiliary

History

United Kingdom
- Name: RFA War Pathan
- Builder: Sir James Laing & Sons Ltd, Sunderland
- Launched: 19 March 1919
- Commissioned: 1923
- Decommissioned: 16 October 1947
- Fate: Sold, 1947; Scrapped, 1950

General characteristics
- Type: War-class tanker
- Displacement: 5,581 long tons (5,671 t)
- Length: 400 ft (120 m)

RFA War Pathan (X84) was a War-class tanker of the British Royal Fleet Auxiliary.

The ship was built by Sir James Laing & Sons Ltd. at their Deptford Yard in Sunderland, and launched on 19 March 1919.

Originally managed by Andrew Weir Shipping & Trading Co. Ltd. in 1923 it was transferred to the Royal Fleet Auxiliary, and served throughout World War II.

The ship was sold as a merchant vessel on 16 October 1947 to Bulk Storage Co. (P.Bauer), London and renamed Basing Bank, in 1948 to Basinghall Shipping Co., London, and was scrapped in 1950 at Antwerp.
