= RFA Ocean Salvor =

King Salvor class salvage vessel of the Royal Fleet Auxiliary

History

United Kingdom
- Name: RFA Ocean Salvor
- Operator: Risdon Beazley
- Ordered: 22 May 1942
- Builder: Wm. Simons & Co. Ltd., Renfrew
- Yard number: 764
- Laid down: 2 October 1942
- Launched: 31 August 1943
- In service: 23 September 1943
- Out of service: November 1958
- Identification: Pennant number: A492
- Fate: Sold commercially, February 1960; Scrapped at Karachi, October 1967

General characteristics
- Class & type: King Salvor class salvage vessel
- Displacement: 1,780 long tons (1,809 t) full load
- Length: 217 ft 11 in (66.42 m)
- Beam: 37 ft 11 in (11.56 m)
- Draught: 15 ft 7 in (4.75 m)
- Propulsion: 2 × 3-cylinder triple expansion steam engines
- Speed: 12 knots (22 km/h; 14 mph)
- Complement: 72
- Armament: 4 × 20 mm AA guns (4×1)

RFA Ocean Salvor (A492) was a King Salvor-class ocean salvage ship of the Royal Fleet Auxiliary (RFA), the naval auxiliary fleet of the United Kingdom.

ASV Ocean Salvor was handed to Risdon Beazley Ltd. on delivery; they managed this ship and 29 other Admiralty salvage vessels until the end of the war when 25 were handed to the Royal Maritime Auxiliary Service and three returned to the USA; two were war losses. These ships were never prefixed HMS as they were civilian crewed.
