= RFA Oleander =

Four ships of the Royal Fleet Auxiliary (RFA) have borne the name RFA Oleander:

- RFA Oleander was an oiler launched in 1917 but was almost immediately renamed as RFA Fernleaf.
- RFA Oleander (1922) was an oiler launched in 1922. She was damaged in an air attack while on convoy duty and was designated as a total constructive loss, in 1940.
- RFA Oleander was an oiler initially laid down as Helicina for Anglo-Saxon Petroleum, then taken over by RFA, intended to be named Oleander. However, with the Second World War having ended, she was returned to Anglo-Saxon Petroleum and completed as planned as Helicina.
- RFA Oleander (A124) was a Ol-class fast fleet tanker launched in 1964. She was renamed Olmeda in 1967 to avoid confusion with the nameship of the Leander-class frigates of the Royal Navy, HMS Leander.
