= RFA Scotol =

History

United Kingdom
- Name: RFA Scotol
- Builder: Tyne Iron Ship Building Company, Howdon, Northumberland
- Launched: 23 June 1916
- Commissioned: November 1916
- Decommissioned: August 1947
- Fate: Sold, 21 April 1948; Wrecked, 12 May 1969

General characteristics
- Class & type: 1000-ton class tanker
- Displacement: 1,177 long tons (1,196 t)
- Length: 220 ft (67 m)
- Beam: 34 ft 6 in (10.52 m)
- Draught: 16 ft 6 in (5.03 m)
- Speed: 12 knots (22 km/h; 14 mph)

RFA Scotol was a 1000-ton class tanker of the British Royal Fleet Auxiliary.

The ship was built by the Tyne Iron Shipbuilding Co. Ltd., at Willington Quay, Howdon, Northumberland, and launched on 23 June 1916. First used as a Port Oiler at Dover, and then stationed at Portland until August 1947, the ship was sold to Hemsley Bell Ltd (H.L.R. Bell, Managers) Southampton on 21 April 1948 and renamed Hemsley I.

The ship ran aground and was wrecked at Fox Cove on 12 May 1969 off Porthcothan, Cornwall, en route from Liverpool to the breakers at Antwerp.
