= RFA Wave Ruler =

Two ships of the Royal Fleet Auxiliary have borne the name RFA Wave Ruler:

- RFA Wave Ruler (A212) was a Wave-class oiler launched in 1946, and scrapped in 1977.
- RFA Wave Ruler (A390) is a Wave-class tanker launched in 2001 and in service but in extended readiness, uncrewed reserve, as of 2024.
