= RFA Spabrook =

1944 Spa-class coastal water carrier of the Royal Fleet Auxiliary

History

United Kingdom
- Name: RFA Spabrook
- Ordered: April 1942
- Builder: Philip and Son, Dartmouth, Devon
- Laid down: 16 September 1943
- Launched: 24 August 1944
- Commissioned: 12 December 1944
- Decommissioned: 1977
- Fate: Arrived at Briton Ferry for scrapping, 13 September 1977

General characteristics
- Displacement: 1,220 long tons (1,240 t) full load
- Length: 172 ft (52 m)
- Beam: 30 ft (9.1 m)
- Draught: 12 ft (3.7 m)
- Propulsion: 3-cylinder triple expansion steam engine, 675 shp (503 kW); 1 shaft
- Speed: 9 knots (17 km/h; 10 mph)
- Armament: 1 × 3 in (76 mm) gun; 2 × 20 mm AA guns

RFA Spabrook (A224) was a coastal water carrier of the Royal Fleet Auxiliary. Arrived at Briton Ferry for scrapping, 13 September 1977.
