= RFA Dewdale =

Two ships of the Royal Fleet Auxiliary have borne the name RFA Dewdale:

- RFA Dewdale (A151) was a Dale-class oiler and landing ship, gantry launched in 1941 and sold in 1959.
- RFA Dewdale (A129) was a Dale-class mobile reserve tanker launched in 1965 as Edenfield. She was acquired in 1967 and returned to her owners in 1977.
