= RFA Brambleleaf =

Three ships of the Royal Fleet Auxiliary have borne the name RFA Brambleleaf:

- RFA Brambleleaf (1917) was an oiler launched in 1916 under the name RFA Rumol. She was renamed Brambleleaf in 1917. She was torpedoed and beached in 1942, and was broken up in 1953.
- RFA Brambleleaf (1959) was a Leaf-class tanker launched as the civilian London Loyalty for London & Overseas Freighters in 1953. She was bareboat chartered in 1959 and returned to her owners in 1972.
- RFA Brambleleaf (A81) was a Leaf-class tanker launched in 1976 as Hudson Deep. She was taken into service in 1980 and sold for scrapping in 2009.
