= RFA Derwentdale =

Two ships of the Royal Fleet Auxiliary have borne the name RFA Derwentdale:

- RFA Derwentdale (A114) was a Dale-class oiler and landing ship, gantry launched in 1941 and sold in 1960.
- RFA Derwentdale (A221) was a Dale-class mobile reserve tanker launched in 1964 as Halcyon Breeze. She was acquired in 1967 and returned to her owners in 1974.
