= RFA Pearleaf =

Two ships of the Royal Fleet Auxiliary were named Pearleaf:

- RFA Pearleaf (1916), a Leaf-class tanker launched in 1916 and scrapped in 1947
- RFA Pearleaf (A77), Leaf-class support tanker launched in 1959 and scrapped in 1993
