= RFA Teakol =

Two ships of the Royal Fleet Auxiliary (RFA) have borne the name RFA Teakol:

- RFA Teakol (X70) was a harbour oiler launched in 1917. She was sold old to the Eagle Oil and Shipping Company and renamed San Dario, in January 1920.
- RFA Teakol (A167) was an Ol-class coastal tanker launched in 1946. She served with the Royal Fleet Auxiliary until being taken out of service in February 1965 and was eventually scrapped four years later.
