= RFA Reliant =

Three ships of the Royal Fleet Auxiliary have borne the name RFA Reliant:

- RFA Reliant (1933) was a stores carrier, formerly the civilian London Importer. She was acquired in 1933 and sold in 1948.
- RFA Reliant (A84) was an air stores support ship, formerly the civilian Somersby. She was acquired in 1957 and scrapped in 1977.
- RFA Reliant (A131) was a helicopter support ship, formerly the civilian Astronomer. She was acquired in 1983 and sold in 1986.
- RFA Reliant is one of the planned ships to be built as part of the Fleet Solid Support Ship Programme.
