= RFA Kinbrace =

RFA Kinbrace photographed from Starboard

RFA Kinbrace was a Kin-class salvage vessel. It was built Alexander Hall and Sons starting from 20 April 1944, and launched on 17 January 1945. It started its service in 1950, and was one of the eleven Kin-class ships that were meant to be built, but two were cancelled, and only seven saw brief RFA service. They were re-rated as Mooring, Salvage and Boom Vessels in 1971. All were equipped with lifting horns and heavy rollers. In wartime they were armed with 2 x 20 mm AA guns. It was named after a small community in Strath Beg in east Sutherland in Scotland. On 1 April 1992, it was sold to SC Chambers, Liverpool, and was laid up at Port Penrhyn in North Wales on 11 May 1992. In 1994, it was purchased by Australian firm Morris Catering. It supported the UN in Malta during October 1994. It was seen laid up in 1998 at Ajman Creek near Dubai. It was purchased again in 2001 by unknown Middle Eastern buyers. On 20 September 2004, now renamed Lady Saniya, it arrived in Alang, India to be scrapped.
