= Risdon Beazley =

British businessman (1904–1979)

- Born: 1904
- Died: 1979 (aged 74–75)
- Occupation: Businessman
- Known for: Marine salvage

Risdon Archibald Beazley (1904–1979) was the founder of Risdon Beazley Ltd, a Marine salvage company that operated from 1926 to 1981 in Southampton, England.

== Early career ==
Beazley formed his company in 1926, when he was 22 years old. Throughout the life of the companies their base remained at Clausentum Yard, Bitterne Manor, Southampton. By the 1930s Risdon Beazley Ltd. was undertaking demolition work and wreck removal. In 1936 Beazley was a partner in the salvage of the square rigger Herzogin Cecilie. In 1937 the British cargo ship English Trader went ashore whilst entering Dartmouth Harbour; Risdon Beazley removed and cut up the bow section. In the same year Kantoeng, then the largest tin dredge in the world, capsized whilst under tow of Smit International tugs; Risdon Beazley removed the hull.

== War years ==
At the outbreak of World War II the Admiralty requisitioned salvage vessels and most were put under Risdon Beazley's management. By 1945 Risdon Beazley were operating 61 vessels, including 29 that were owned by the Admiralty, working as far east as Colombo. They lost three vessels and a barge in the war. The other managers operated less than 20 vessels between them.

Risdon Beazley managed all but three of the salvage vessels that went to France for D-Day; their ships went on to clear ports in France, Belgium and the Netherlands. The vessels were civilian crewed. Usually the only military people aboard were DEMS gunners and a salvage officer. The company built 22 Fairmile Motor Gun Boats and Motor Torpedo Boats; they were the fastest UK yard to turn out the D type MTB and fourth fastest in the UK for all Fairmiles. They also built ten harbour Service launches.

At the end of the war they retained the self-propelled hoppers Foremost 17 and Foremost 18 and the Coastal Salvage vessels Lifeline and Help. They spent several successful years in rescue towage using the salvage tug Twyford (ex-Warden) and the Ashford (ex-Empire Sandy). Twenty other vessels joined and left the fleet in the years immediately after the war. Later the landing craft Topmast 16, 18 and 20 were rebuilt for salvage work; Topmast 16 and Lifeline maintained emergency moorings around the UK coast. The fleet included the smaller Topmast 17 (an ex Inshore minesweeper) and the Queen Mother (an ex-Bristol Channel Pilot cutter).

== Post war activities ==
RB found his niche in cargo recovery, which had been the preserve of the Italian Company SORIMA before the war. Treasury figures show that over four years in the 1950s they contributed £187,000 to the Exchequer as a result of this work. The new recovery vessels Twyford and Droxford were delivered in the 1950s. The cost of the Droxford was £406,000, the Treasury contributed £25,000. They recovered 56,000 tons of non-ferrous metals from depths down to 300 meters, working worldwide.

In the sixties Risdon Beazley had co-operated with Ulrich Harms of Hamburg. A notable joint operation was to salvage Isambard Kingdom Brunel's ship SS Great Britain from the Falkland Islands and redeliver it to Bristol.

Beazley sold his interests to Ulrich Harms between 1969 and 1971. In 1972 Harms sold the companies to Smit Tak of Rotterdam. Initially Risdon Beazley Marine Ltd. expanded with the purchase of the floating cranes Brunel and Telford, plus the 5,000 BHP Seaford and pontoons.

By the late 1970s, the fleet was run down, and the company closed in 1981.

== See also ==
- King Salvor class salvage vessel
