= RFA Spalake =

1946 Spa-class coastal water carrier of the Royal Fleet Auxiliary

History

United Kingdom
- Name: RFA Spalake
- Ordered: May 1944
- Builder: Charles Hill & Sons
- Laid down: 13 August 1945
- Launched: 10 August 1946
- Commissioned: 28 November 1946
- Decommissioned: 1977
- Fate: Arrived Dalmuir for demolition, August 1977

General characteristics
- Displacement: 1,219 long tons (1,239 t)
- Length: 172 ft (52 m)
- Beam: 30 ft (9.1 m)
- Draught: 12 ft (3.7 m)
- Propulsion: 3-cylinder triple expansion steam engine, 675 shp (503 kW); 1 shaft
- Speed: 9 knots (17 km/h; 10 mph)
- Armament: 1 × 3 in (76 mm) gun; 2 × 20 mm AA guns

RFA Spalake (A260) was a coastal water carrier of the Royal Fleet Auxiliary and one of two ships of the class to be built in Bristol by Charles Hill & Sons.
