= RFA Appleleaf =

Three ships of the Royal Fleet Auxiliary have borne the name RFA Appleleaf:

- RFA Appleleaf (1916) was a Leaf-class tanker launched in 1916 as RFA Texol, renamed RFA Appleleaf in 1917 and broken up in 1947.
- RFA Appleleaf (A83) was a Leaf-class tanker launched in 1955 as George Lyras. She was purchased by the RFA in 1959 and returned to her owners in 1970.
- RFA Appleleaf (A79) was a Leaf-class tanker launched in 1975 as Hudson Cavalier and taken into service in 1979. She was leased to the Royal Australian Navy in 1989 as HMAS Westralia (O 195), and was sold to them in 1994.
