= RFA Petronel =

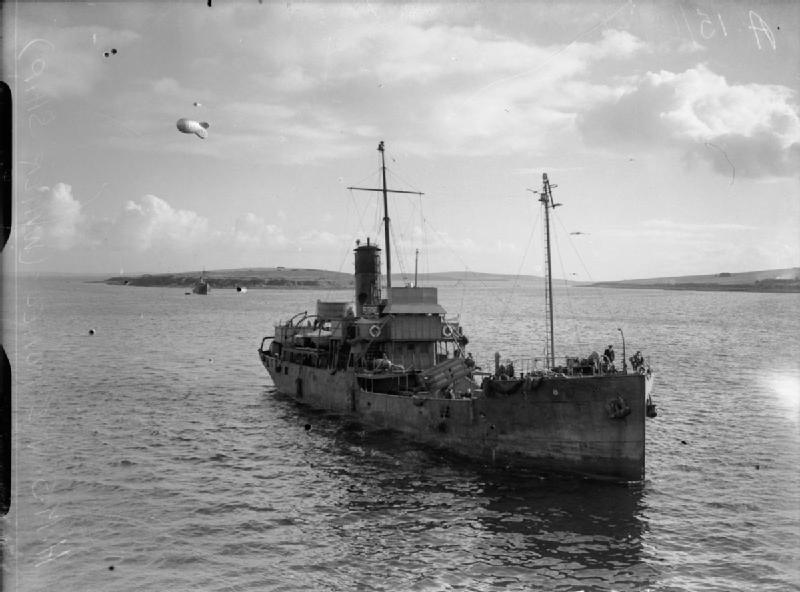
RFA Petronel

RFA Petronel, a fleet support tanker, was used at the end of World War I, to support minesweepers in the North Sea. It was also used during World War II, to supply water to battleships. Generally, it spent most of its time in UK waters near Portsmouth.
