= RFA Spa =

1942 Spa-class coastal water carrier of the Royal Fleet Auxiliary

History

United Kingdom
- Name: RFA Spa
- Ordered: October 1939
- Builder: Philip and Son, Dartmouth, Devon
- Laid down: 26 September 1940
- Launched: 8 November 1941
- Commissioned: 24 April 1942
- Fate: Laid up at Greenock. Arrived Passage West, Cork for scrapping, 9 October 1970

General characteristics
- Class & type: Spa-class water carrier
- Tonnage: 500 long tons deadweight (DWT)
- Displacement: 1,219 long tons (1,239 t) full load
- Length: 172 ft (52 m) oa; 160 ft (49 m) pp
- Beam: 30 ft (9.1 m)
- Draught: 12 ft (3.7 m)
- Propulsion: 3-cylinder triple expansion steam engine, 675 ihp (503 kW); 1 shaft
- Speed: 9 knots (17 km/h; 10 mph)
- Armament: 1 × 3 in (76 mm) gun; 2 × 20 mm AA guns

RFA Spa (A192) was a coastal water carrier of the Royal Fleet Auxiliary. Her bell is now in the chapel of St Nicholas, Langstone, Havant.
