= RFA Spapool =

1946 Spa-class coastal water carrier of the Royal Fleet Auxiliary

History

United Kingdom
- Name: RFA Spapool
- Builder: Charles Hill & Sons, Bristol
- Laid down: 13 August 1945
- Launched: 28 February 1946
- Commissioned: 14 June 1946
- Decommissioned: 1976
- Stricken: 1976
- Fate: Sold into commercial service, July 1976; Scrapped, 1984

General characteristics
- Type: Coastal water carrier
- Tonnage: 500 long tons deadweight (DWT)
- Displacement: 1,219 long tons (1,239 t) full load
- Length: 172 ft (52 m)
- Beam: 30 ft 2 in (9.19 m)
- Draught: 12 ft (140 in)
- Propulsion: 3-cylinder triple expansion steam engine, 675 ihp (503 kW), 1 shaft
- Speed: 9 knots (17 km/h; 10 mph)
- Armament: 1 × 3 in (76 mm) gun; 2 × 20 mm AA guns

RFA Spapool (A222) was a Spa-class coastal water carrier of the Royal Fleet Auxiliary.

The ship was laid down on 13 August 1945 by Charles Hill & Sons of Bristol, launched on 28 February 1946, and was commissioned on 14 June 1946, serving until 1976 when it was sold off by the Ministry of Defence.

Spapool was purchased commercially in July 1976 at Mombasa and used by Divecon Ltd. as a salvage vessel later that year for the recovery of MV Southern Pioneer, a tanker that sank at Tanga, Tanzania. She was used as a bunker barge in Mombasa after the boiler was condemned. The ship sank on Christmas Day 1983, and was salvaged by Divecon Ltd., Mombasa in 1984, and scrapped.
