= RFA Plumleaf =

Two ships of the Royal Fleet Auxiliary were named Plumleaf:

- RFA Plumleaf (1917), a Leaf-class tanker (5,916 GRT) launched in 1917. Bombed and sunk by the Luftwaffe on 4 April 1942 at Malta.
- RFA Plumleaf (A78), Leaf-class support tanker launched in 1960 and decommissioned in 1986.
