= RFA Oakol =

Two ships of the Royal Fleet Auxiliary have borne the name RFA Oakol:

- RFA Oakol (1917) was an Creosol-class tanker launched in 1917 and sold into civilian service in 1920 under the name Orthis.
- RFA Oakol (A300) was an Ol-class coastal tanker launched in 1946, decommissioned in 1965 and scrapped in 1969.
