= RFA Spaburn =

1946 Spa-class coastal water carrier of the Royal Fleet Auxiliary

History

United Kingdom
- Name: RFA Spaburn
- Ordered: May 1944
- Builder: Philip and Son, Dartmouth, Devon
- Laid down: 7 October 1944
- Launched: 5 January 1946
- Commissioned: 12 April 1946
- Decommissioned: 1977
- Stricken: 1977
- Fate: Arrived Dalmuir for scrapping, August 1977

General characteristics
- Displacement: 1,219 long tons (1,239 t)
- Length: 172 ft (52 m)
- Beam: 30 ft (9.1 m)
- Draught: 12 ft (3.7 m)
- Propulsion: 3-cylinder triple expansion steam engine, 675 shp (503 kW); 1 shaft
- Speed: 9 knots (17 km/h; 10 mph)
- Armament: 1 × 3 in (76 mm) gun; 2 × 20 mm AA guns

RFA Spaburn (A257) was a coastal Spa-class water carrier of the Royal Fleet Auxiliary.
