= RFA Sir Caradoc =

Roll-on/roll-off ferry chartered to the Royal Fleet Auxiliary

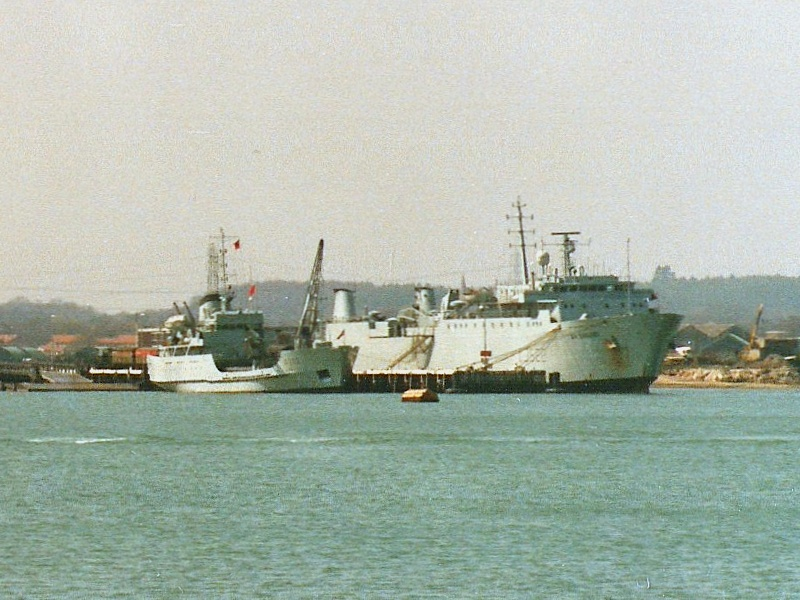
- RFA Sir Caradoc alongside a smaller vessel at Marchwood Military Port in 1984

History

United Kingdom
- Name: RFA Sir Caradoc
- Laid down: 13 December 1971
- Launched: 11 August 1972
- Commissioned: 17 March 1983
- Decommissioned: June 1988
- Renamed: Launched as Grey Master in 1972; Renamed Sir Caradoc in 1983; Stamveien in July 1988; Hua Lu in 1994; Morning Star 11 in 2002; Royal Nusantara in 2006
- Identification: IMO number: 7224837; MMSI number: 525002069; Callsign: YHIU
- Fate: Sold into civilian service

General characteristics
- Length: 406 ft 10 in (124.00 m)
- Beam: 53 ft 11 in (16.43 m)
- Draught: 16 ft 0.25 in (4.88 m)
- Propulsion: 4 x 9 cyl Normo diesels
- Speed: 16 knots (30 km/h)
- Complement: 24

RFA Sir Caradoc (L3522) was a temporarily chartered roll-on/roll-off ferry of the Royal Fleet Auxiliary. She was procured to fill the gap caused by loss and damage to Round Table class landing ships during the Falklands War.

As of March 2026, she is actively sailing as Royal Nusantara in Indonesia.
