= RFA Salviola =

King Salvor class salvage vessel of the Royal Fleet Auxiliary

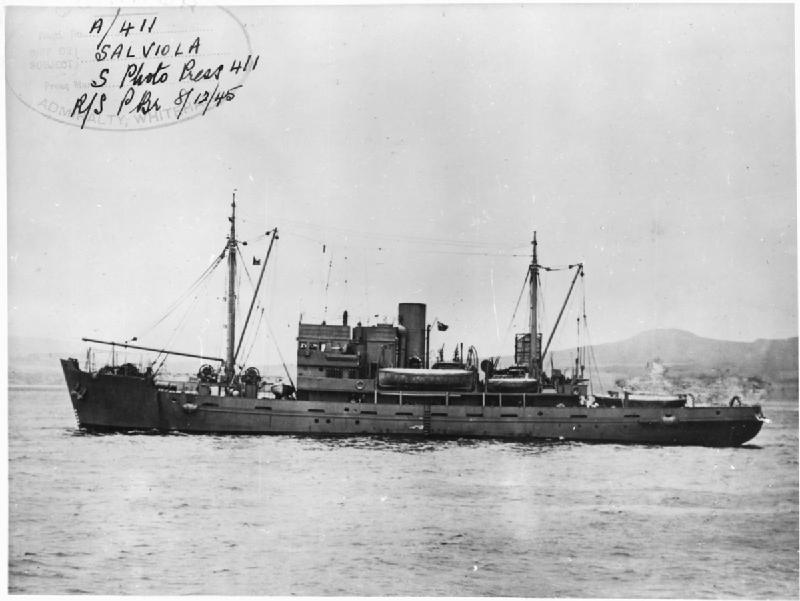

History

United Kingdom
- Name: RFA Salviola
- Ordered: 7 June 1943
- Builder: Wm. Simons & Co. Ltd., Renfrew
- Yard number: 773
- Laid down: 23 June 1944
- Launched: 9 July 1945
- Commissioned: 25 July 1945
- Decommissioned: November 1958
- Identification: IMO number: 5159727
- Fate: Sold to Turkish Navy, 28 August 1959

General characteristics
- Class & type: King Salvor class salvage vessel
- Displacement: 1,780 long tons (1,809 t) full load
- Length: 217 ft 4 in (66.24 m)
- Beam: 37 ft 11 in (11.56 m)
- Draught: 15 ft 3 in (4.65 m)
- Propulsion: 2 × 3-cylinder triple expansion steam engines
- Speed: 12 knots (22 km/h; 14 mph)
- Complement: 72
- Armament: 4 × 20 mm AA guns (4×1)

RFA Salviola (A502) was a British salvage vessel of the Royal Fleet Auxiliary.

Built by Wm. Simons & Co Ltd., of Renfrew, she was launched on 9 July 1945, commissioned on 25 July 1945, and decommissioned in November 1958. The ship was sold to Turkish Navy on 28 August 1959, renamed Imroz II, and renamed Cemil Parman in 1985. The ship arrived at Aliağa for scrapping on 2 October 1992.
