= RFA Salvalour =

King Salvor class salvage vessel of the Royal Fleet Auxiliary

History

United Kingdom
- Name: RFA Salvalour
- Ordered: 17 April 1943
- Builder: Goole Shipbuilding & Repair Co Ltd, Goole
- Yard number: 408
- Laid down: 7 January 1944
- Launched: 2 November 1944
- Commissioned: 4 September 1945
- Decommissioned: October 1955
- Identification: IMO number: 5308304
- Fate: Sold, 25 November 1971; Scrapped, February 1978

General characteristics
- Class & type: King Salvor class salvage vessel
- Displacement: 1,780 long tons (1,809 t) full load
- Length: 218 ft (66 m)
- Beam: 39 ft 10 in (12.14 m)
- Draught: 15 ft 7 in (4.75 m)
- Propulsion: 2 × 3-cylinder triple expansion steam engines
- Speed: 12 knots (22 km/h; 14 mph)
- Complement: 72
- Armament: 4 × 20 mm AA guns (4×1)

RFA Salvalour (A494) was a salvage ship of the Royal Fleet Auxiliary.

Salvalour was built by the Goole Shipbuilding & Repair Company, Goole, launched on 2 November 1944, and commissioned on 4 September 1945. The ship was decommissioned in October 1955 and laid up in reserve. She was sold into commercial service on 25 November 1971, and was scrapped in Pakistan in February 1978.
