= RFA Fort Sandusky =

1945 Fort-class stores ship of the Royal Fleet Auxiliary

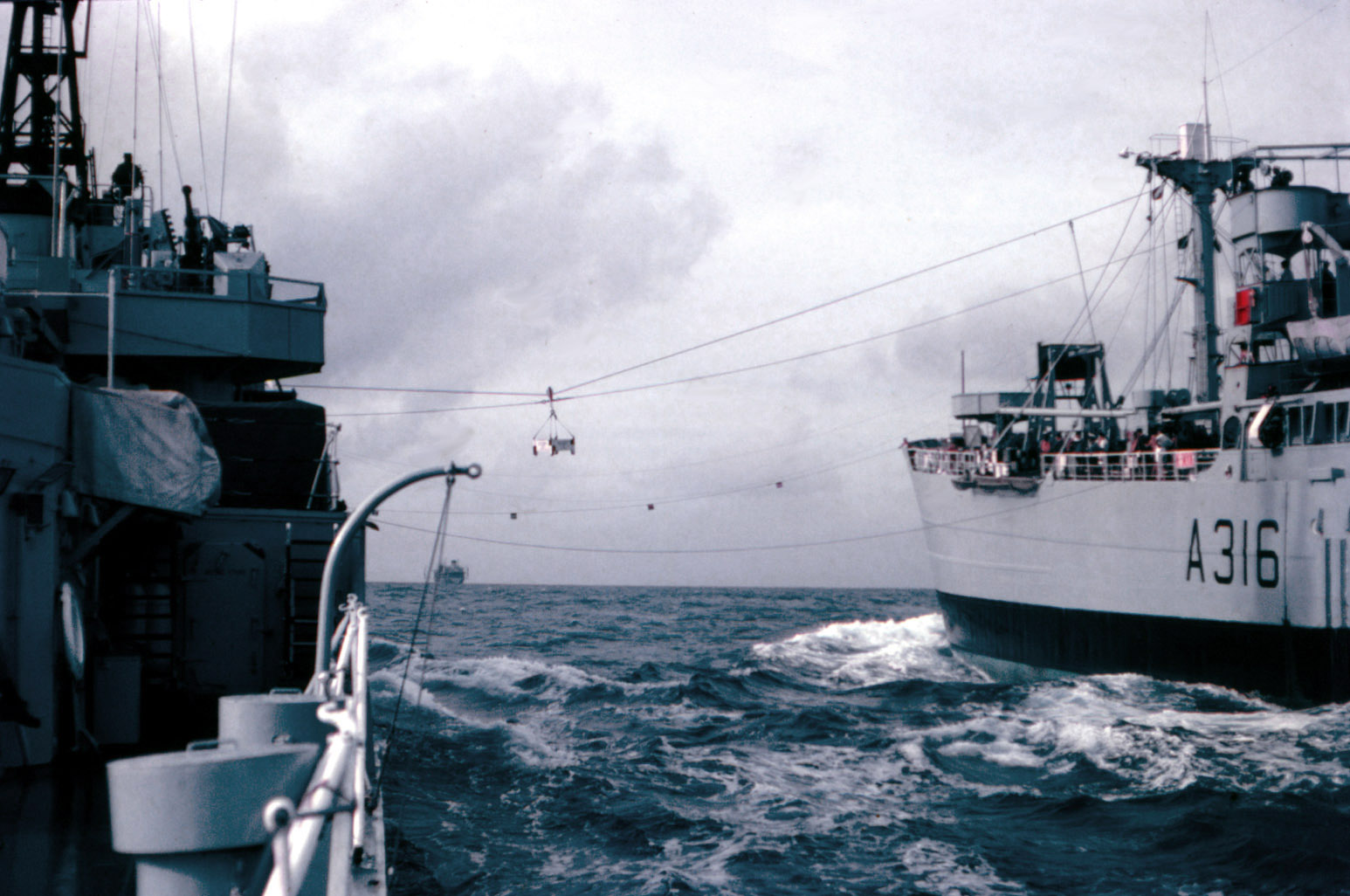
- Ajax replenishing at sea from RFA Fort Sandusky

History

United Kingdom
- Name: RFA Fort Sandusky
- Laid down: 11 February 1944
- Launched: 25 November 1944
- Commissioned: 1 August 1945
- Decommissioned: 13 February 1972
- Stricken: 1973
- Fate: Sold for scrapping, 1973

General characteristics
- Tonnage: 7,313 GRT; 4,003 NRT; 7,580 t DWT
- Length: 441 ft 6 in (134.57 m)
- Beam: 57 ft 2 in (17.42 m)
- Draught: 27 ft (8.2 m)
- Propulsion: 1 × 3-cylinder triple expansion steam engine, 2,500 ihp (1,864 kW); 1 shaft
- Speed: 11 knots (20 km/h; 13 mph)
- Range: 11,400 nmi (21,100 km) at 10 kn (19 km/h; 12 mph)
- Complement: 115
- Armament: World War II : 1 × 4 in (100 mm) gun; 8 × 20 mm AA guns

RFA Fort Sandusky (A316) was an armament stores carrier of the Royal Fleet Auxiliary (RFA).

Fort Sandusky was laid down on 11 February 1944, launched on 25 November 194, and commissioned on 1 August 1945. The ship was transferred to the RFA on 13 January 1949, and decommissioned on 13 February 1972. Laid up at Rosyth, she arrived at Castellón for scrapping on 10 February 1973.
