= HMAS Supply (AO 195) =

Tide-class replenishment oiler of the Royal Fleet Auxiliary and Royal Australian Navy

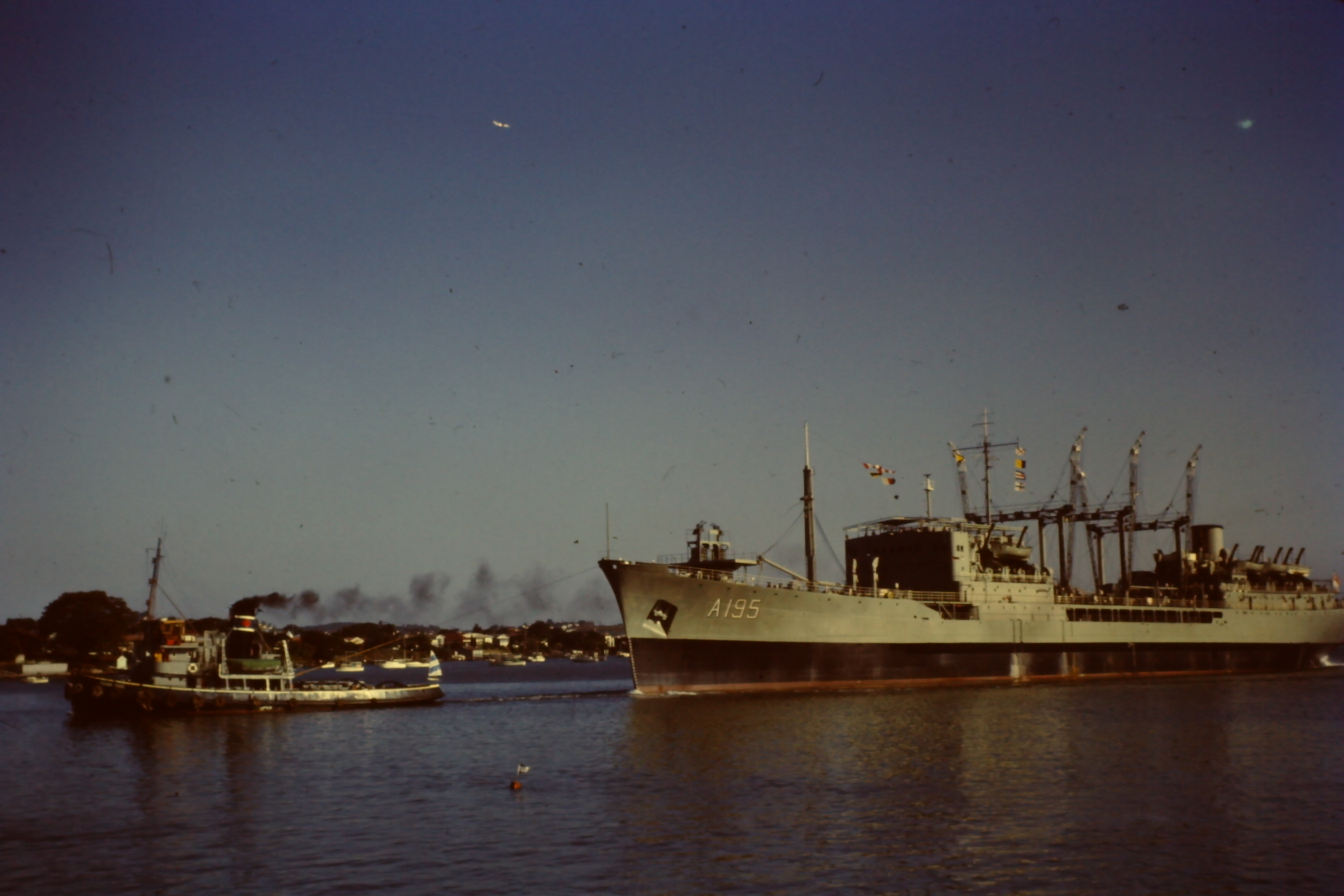
- HMAS Supply being towed along the Brisbane river in late 1967

History

Australia
- Name: Tide Austral
- Ordered: Late 1951
- Builder: Harland & Wolff
- Cost: £A3.13 million
- Laid down: 5 August 1952
- Launched: 1 September 1954
- Completed: 1955
- Fate: Loaned to the Royal Fleet Auxiliary on completion

United Kingdom
- Name: Tide Austral
- Acquired: March 1955
- Commissioned: 28 May 1955
- Fate: Returned to Australia in 1962

Australia
- Name: Tide Austral
- Acquired: 15 August 1962
- Commissioned: 15 August 1962
- Decommissioned: 16 December 1985
- Renamed: HMAS Supply, 7 September 1962

General characteristics
- Class & type: Tide-class replenishment oiler
- Displacement: 26,000 long tons (26,417 t) Full Load
- Length: 583 feet (178 m)
- Beam: 71 feet (22 m)
- Draught: 32 feet (9.8 m)
- Propulsion: 3 × Babcock & Wilcox boilers
- Speed: 17 knots (31 km/h; 20 mph)
- Complement: 90 (RFA)

HMAS Supply (AO 195) was a Tide-class replenishment oiler of the Royal Fleet Auxiliary (RFA) and the Royal Australian Navy (RAN). Originally named Tide Austral and intended to be the first ship of a post-World War II Royal Australian Fleet Auxiliary, manpower and financial shortages meant that when the Belfast-built ship was launched in 1955, she could not be accepted into Australian service. Instead, she was loaned to the RFA, operating RFA Tide Austral (A99). In August 1962, the ship was commissioned directly into the RAN, then renamed a month later to HMAS Supply. Supply operated as part of the RAN until her decommissioning at the end of 1985.

== Design, construction, and acquisition ==
In the early 1950s, the RAN considered acquiring a fleet tanker to support their forces. It was suggested that Australia order a Tide-class replenishment oiler from the United Kingdom (the Royal Navy having ordered three ships of the design), as the backlog of Navy construction in Australian dockyards would prevent an Australian-built tanker from entering service until at least the late 1950s. The tanker was to be the first ship of a post-war Royal Australian Fleet Auxiliary, would be manned by merchant seafarers to reduce demand on RAN service personnel, and would reduce the RAN's dependency on foreign fuel suppliers. The acquisition was approved by the Defence Committee and the Cabinet of Australia in August 1951, with the order placed by the end of the year.

The ship, which was to be named RAFA Tide Austral, was laid down by Harland & Wolff Limited at Belfast in Northern Ireland on 5 August 1952, and launched on 1 September 1954. The tanker was completed at the start of 1955, at a cost of £A3.13 million: 20% over the forecast price. However, financial difficulties and a manpower shortage meant that the RAN could not operate the ship, and efforts to find a merchant operator were unsuccessful. Efforts to sell the ship to another navy or a civilian operator also failed, but in March 1955, the British Admiralty offered to take Tide Austral on loan and operate her as part of the Royal Fleet Auxiliary.

== Operational history ==
=== RFA service ===
The tanker was operated by the British Admiralty with a civilian crew as a Royal Fleet Auxiliary under the name Tide Austral from 1955 to 1962. Her service under Admiralty control included various charter periods, including two years (1956–58) when she was employed at the Admiralty's discretion, operating in direct payment of a debt incurred for the taking over of Shell Tankers Ltd building berths.

=== RAN acquisition ===
In 1962, the ship was purchased by Australia and commissioned into the Royal Australian Navy on 15 August 1962, under her original name. She was renamed HMAS Supply on 7 September 1962 in a ceremony presided over by the wife of Rear Admiral Otto Becher, the Australian Naval Representative in the United Kingdom.

=== RAN service ===
During her Australian service, Supply, accompanied initially by Royal New Zealand Navy (RNZN) frigate Otago, and later by RNZN frigate Canterbury, sailed to Moruroa Atoll in official protest of the French Canopus atmospheric nuclear test. On 27 December 1974, Supply sailed from Sydney as part of Operation Navy Help Darwin; a 13-ship relief force sent to Darwin following Cyclone Tracy. In 1975, Supply was present for the proclamation of Papua New Guinea's independence from Australia, and later for the bicentennial of the United States of America's independence from Britain.

On 8 September 1980, Supply joined five other RAN vessels to form the Australia Squadron. The Squadron, which included HMA Ships Melbourne, Perth, Derwent, Stalwart, and Otama spent two months in the Indian Ocean as part of a flag-showing cruise; the largest RAN deployment since World War II.

== Fate ==
HMAS Supply paid off on 16 December 1985, and was replaced by HMAS Success.
