= RFA Salvictor =

King Salvor class salvage vessel of the Royal Fleet Auxiliary

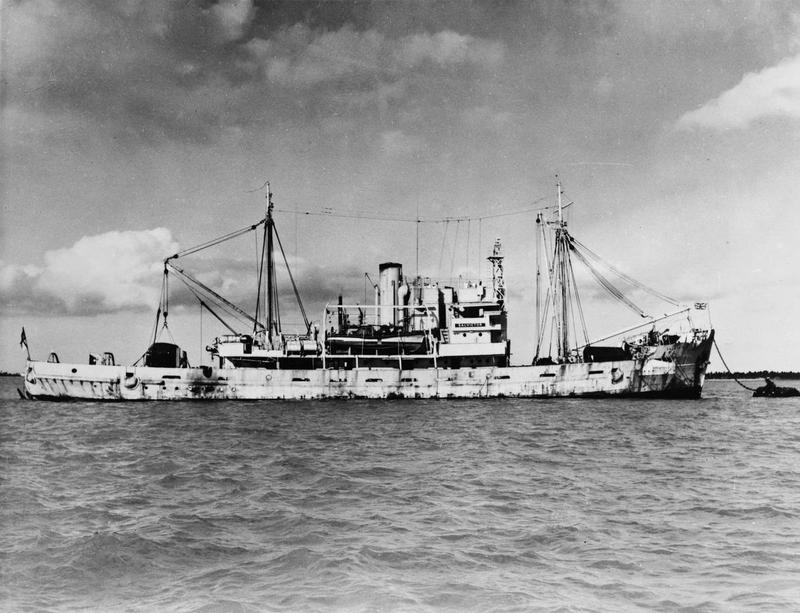
- HMS Salvictor

History

United Kingdom
- Name: RFA Salvictor
- Ordered: 13 August 1942
- Builder: Wm. Simons & Co. Ltd., Renfrew
- Yard number: 765
- Laid down: 27 June 1943
- Launched: 11 March 1944
- Commissioned: 31 March 1944
- Decommissioned: 1970
- Fate: Handed over to the breakers at Briton Ferry, 19 June 1970

General characteristics
- Class & type: King Salvor class salvage vessel
- Displacement: 1,780 long tons (1,809 t) full load
- Length: 217 ft 10 in (66.40 m)
- Beam: 37 ft 11 in (11.56 m)
- Draught: 15 ft 7 in (4.75 m)
- Propulsion: 2 × 3-cylinder triple expansion steam engines
- Speed: 12 knots (22 km/h; 14 mph)
- Complement: 72
- Armament: 4 × 20 mm AA guns (4×1)

RFA Salvictor (A500) was a salvage vessel of the Royal Fleet Auxiliary. She was deployed in 1951 as part of the effort to locate the missing submarine HMS Affray.

Salvictor was built by Wm. Simons & Co. Ltd. of Renfrew, launched on 11 March 1944, and commissioned on 31 March 1944. Decommissioned in 1970, the ship was handed over to the breakers at Briton Ferry on 19 June 1970.
