= RFA Maine (1905) =

Hospital ship of the Royal Fleet Auxiliary

History

United Kingdom
- Name: RFA Maine
- Builder: D & W Henderson & Co. Ltd., Glasgow
- Launched: 1 December 1905, as SS Heliopolis
- Acquired: by purchase, 1913
- Commissioned: as Mediator
- Renamed: Maine, June 1914
- Fate: Sold to previous owner, 7 March 1916; Scrapped at Genoa, 1932

General characteristics
- Type: Hospital ship
- Tonnage: 4,688 GRT
- Propulsion: Triple expansion engine, single screw
- Speed: 12.5 knots (23.2 km/h; 14.4 mph)

RFA Maine was a hospital ship of the British Royal Fleet Auxiliary, that served during World War I.

The second ship to bear the name, she was built by D & W Henderson & Co. Ltd. of Glasgow for Harris & Dixon & Co. Ltd., as the SS Heliopolis. Launched on 1 December 1905, she was purchased by the Admiralty in 1913, and converted at Pembroke Dock for service in World War I, and was renamed Mediator. After the loss of the first RFA Maine (RFA Maine (1887)), the Mediator was renamed. However, she proved unsuitable for the task, and was sold back to her previous owners on 7 March 1916. She was broken up in Genoa in 1932.
