= RFA Tidesurge (A98) =

1955 Tide-class replenishment oiler of the Royal Fleet Auxiliary

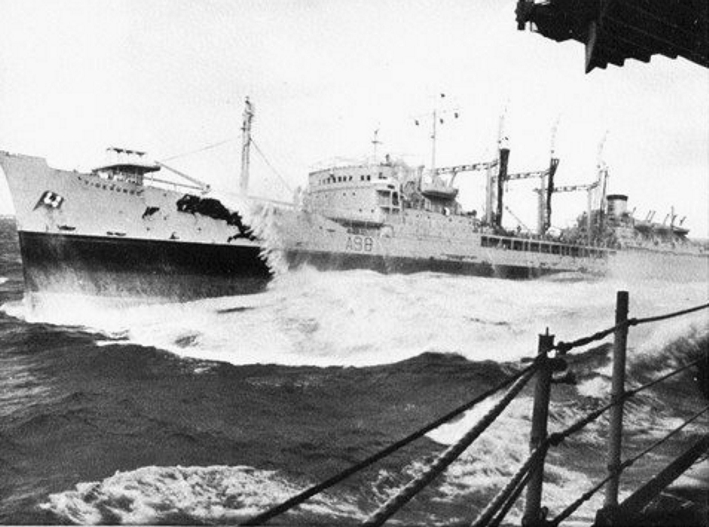
- RFA Tidesurge (A98) in 1967

History

United Kingdom
- Name: RFA Tidesurge
- Builder: James Laing & Sons
- Laid down: 1 July 1953
- Launched: 1 July 1954
- In service: 30 August 1955
- Out of service: May 1976
- Renamed: 28 June 1958 Tidesurge,
- Identification: IMO number: 5361045; Pennant number: A98
- Fate: Scrapped June 1977

General characteristics
- Class & type: Tide-class replenishment oiler
- Displacement: 26,000 long tons (26,417 t)
- Length: 583 ft 4 in (177.80 m)
- Beam: 71 ft 4 in (21.74 m)
- Draught: 32 ft 1 in (9.78 m)
- Propulsion: 2 × Parmetrada steam turbines; 3 × Babcock & Wilcox boilers
- Speed: 17 knots (20 mph; 31 km/h)
- Complement: 90 RFA

RFA Tidesurge (A98) was a Tide-class replenishment oiler of the Royal Fleet Auxiliary. Launched in 1954, the ship was originally named Tiderange but was renamed in 1958 to avoid confusion with other members of the class. She was taken out of service in 1976 and left Portsmouth under tow on 19 April 1977 for Valencia where she was scrapped in June 1977.

== Design and construction ==
Tidesurge was planned to operate with a normal complement of 100 Royal Fleet Auxiliary personnel. She was fitted with the latest abeam rigs with automatic tension winches and an astern fuelling rig. The ship was able to carry 8,500 tons of Furnace Fuel Oil, 4,600 tons of diesel oil and 1,900 tons of avcat.

The construction of Tidesurge was carried out in the north east of England by James Laing & Sons. She was laid down on 1 July 1953 and was launched the following year, on 1 July 1954. She displaced fully loaded, 26,000 tons, was just over 583 ft in overall length and was capable of 17 knots.
