= RFA Argus =

Aviation Training Ship and Primary Casualty Receiving Ship of the Royal Fleet Auxiliary

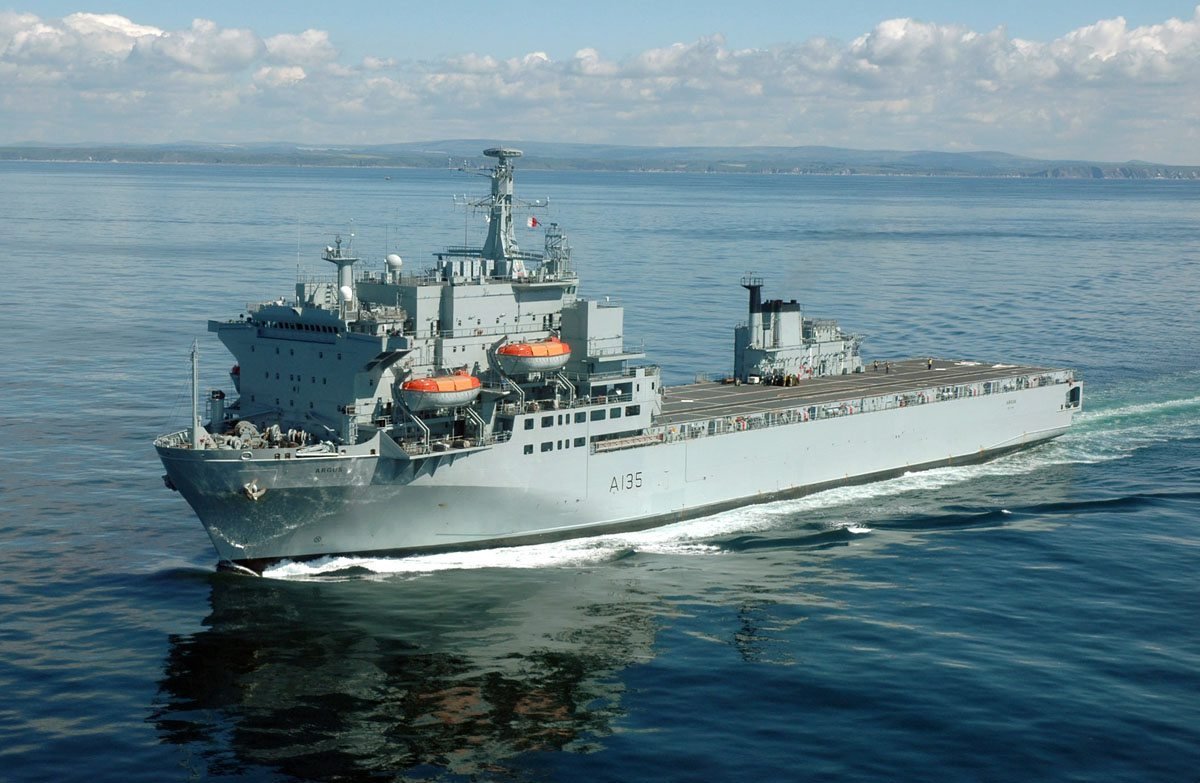
- RFA Argus off the coast of Devonport in 2007.

History

United Kingdom
- Name: MV Contender Bezant
- Owner: Contender 2 Ltd (Sea Containers, Managers)
- Port of registry: Hamilton, Bermuda
- Builder: Società Italiana Ernesto Breda at Marghera
- Yard number: 293
- Launched: 28 November 1980
- Completed: 31 July 1981
- Fate: Sold to Harland and Wolff, 1 March 1984
- Notes: Requisitioned by Ministry of Defence, May 1982. Returned to owner, November 1982.

United Kingdom
- Name: RFA Argus
- Acquired: 18 March 1988
- Commissioned: 1 June 1988
- Out of service: Mid-2025
- Renamed: 25 March 1987
- Home port: HMNB Devonport
- Identification: Pennant number : A135; IMO number: 7822550; MMSI number: 233303000; International call sign: GDSA; Deck code: AS
- Motto: Occuli Omnium (Eyes of All)
- Honours and awards: Falkland Islands 1982 (as the MV Contender Bezant), Gulf War 1991, Bosnia War 1992, Kosovo War 1998, Ebola Crisis 2015
- Status: Deemed unsafe to sail as of late-2025; confirmed for scrapping in February 2026
- Badge

General characteristics
- Type: Littoral strike ship; secondary functions: Role 3 casualty treatment/aviation training and support vessel
- Displacement: 28,081 tonnes
- Length: 175.1 m (574 ft 6 in)
- Beam: 30.4 m (99 ft 9 in)
- Draught: 8.1 m (26 ft 7 in)
- Propulsion: 2 × Lindholmen Pielstick 18 PC2.5V diesels, twin propellers; bow-thruster
- Speed: 18 knots (33 km/h)
- Range: 20,000 nautical miles at 10 knots
- Complement: 80 RFA; 50 RN; (Part of the Maritime Aviation Support Force); 137 RN air squadron personnel (When embarked); 200 Nursing and Medical Staff (When the Hospital is activated)
- Sensors & processing systems: RT994 Surveillance Radar; Kelvin Hughes Ltd SharpEye navigation radar
- Armament: 1 × Phalanx CIWS (removed from the ship as of late-2025 due to laid-up status); 2 × Oerlikon 20 mm/85 KAA on GAM-BO1 mountings; 4 × 7.62mm GPMGs; Mk44 Miniguns (retired as of 2023; may be replaced by Browning .50 caliber heavy machine guns); Seagnat chaff launchers
- Aircraft carried: Three landing spots; capacity of up to nine Westland Merlin helicopters or equivalent mix of CH47 Chinooks, WAH-64 Apaches and/or AgustaWestland AW159 Wildcats
- Aviation facilities: 1 Aircraft lift from Flight Deck to 4-Deck number 2 hangar, 4x hangars

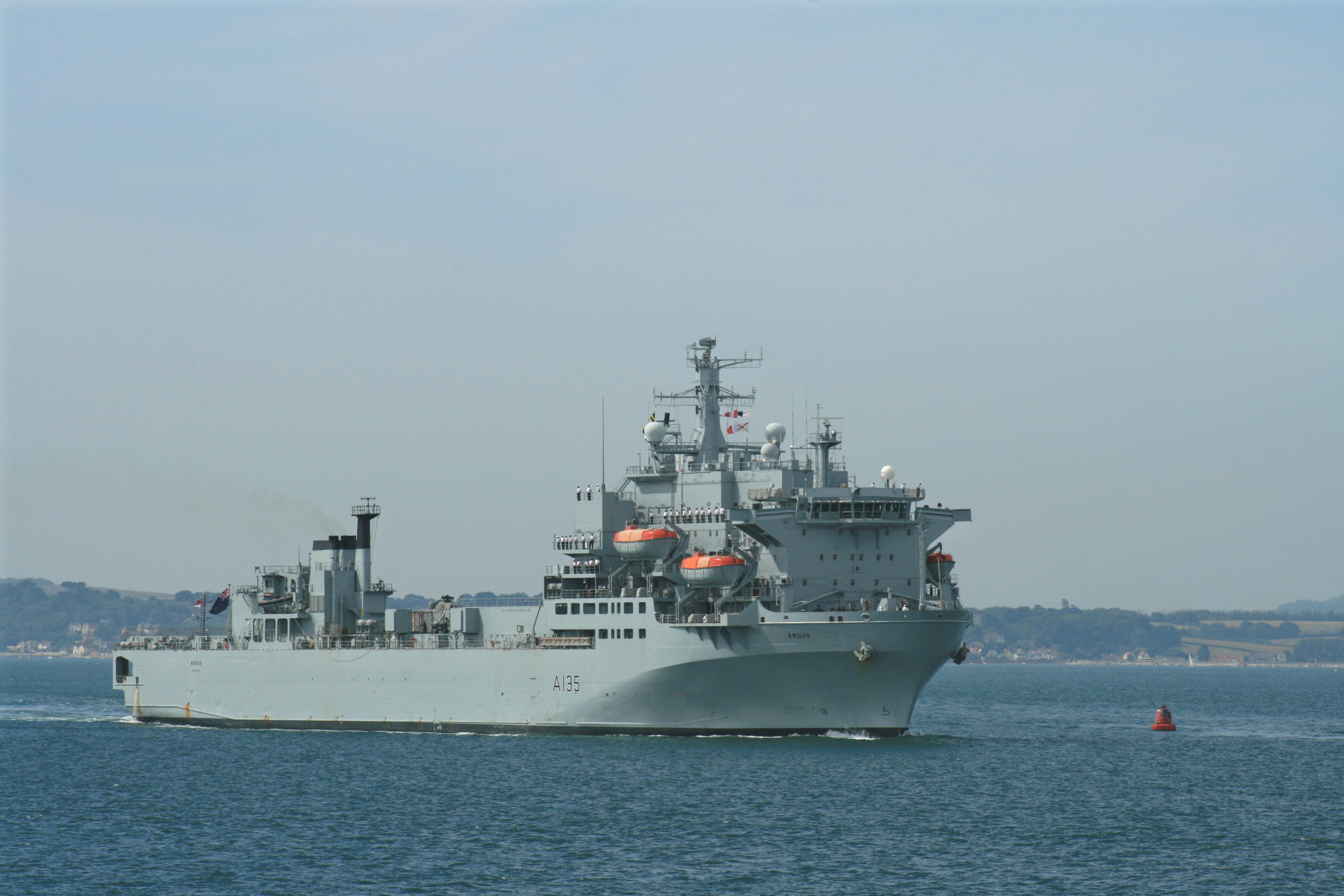
Argus enters Portsmouth Naval Base on 9 July 2010 with the crew lining the decks.

RFA Argus was a ship of the Royal Fleet Auxiliary operated by the Ministry of Defence under the Blue Ensign. Italian-built, Argus was formerly the container ship MV Contender Bezant. The ship was requisitioned in 1982 for service in the Falklands War and purchased outright in 1984 for a four-year conversion to an Aviation Training Ship, replacing RFA Engadine. In 1991, during the Gulf War, she was fitted with an extensive and fully functional hospital to assume the additional role of Primary Casualty Receiving Ship. In 2009, the PCRS role became the ship's primary function. In July 2022 it was reported that the future Littoral Strike Role would be assumed by Argus after a refit to convert her to this role. As of October 2023, Argus had started her deployment to serve as part of Littoral Response Group (South).

In her secondary role as a primary casualty receiving ship, given she was an armed vessel and not painted in the required white with red crosses, the Geneva Convention does not permit her to be being officially classified as a hospital ship. The ship's capabilities made her ideally suited to the humanitarian aid role and she undertook several of these missions. The Royal Navy occasionally described her as a "support ship/helicopter carrier".

Argus had been due to remain in service beyond 2030. However, as of 2025 she had been deemed "unsafe to sail" and was effectively laid-up. In early 2026, it was confirmed that she would be sold for scrap.

== Design and facilities ==
The ship was built by Società Italiana Ernesto Breda at Marghera in Italy for Contender 2 Ltd (Sea Containers, Managers) of Hamilton, Bermuda, and was launched on 28 November 1980. In May 1982, the Contender Bezant was taken-up from trade by the Ministry of Defence (MoD) and given a basic conversion at HMNB Devonport to allow her to operate helicopters and Harrier jump jets in the transport role for Operation Corporate, the British military deployment to the Falkland Islands. She arrived in the area shortly after the Argentine surrender and following a refit to her original configuration, was returned to her owners in November.

Following the conflict, the MoD investigated the replacement of the small helicopter support ship RFA Engadine, commissioning Vickers Shipbuilding and Engineering (VSEL) make a "concept study" resulting in the decision to convert a merchant ship to operate anti-submarine helicopters and with the ability to ferry Sea Harrier aircraft. In December 1983 the MoD invited British Shipbuilders of Birkenhead and Harland and Wolff in Belfast to tender on the building of a new Air Training Ship (ATS) or to purchase and convert an existing ship along the lines proposed by VSEL. By coincidence both tenders proposed converting the laid-up Contender Bezant and in March 1984, a fixed price contract was awarded to Harland and Wolff. Accordingly, she was purchased by the company for the estimated price of £18 million on 14 March 1984.

After a four-year conversion, the ship entered RFA service in 1988. Having been initially designed as a container ship, she would have been too stable when unloaded, making her motion at sea "very stiff" which resulted in a very short roll period which is not appropriate for operating helicopters. Therefore, her superstructure is deliberately heavily built (weighing some 800 tons), and she has 1,800 tons of concrete ballast carried in former hatch covers, which have been inverted to form tray-like structures.

Being a former container ship, Argus does not have a traditional aircraft carrier layout – the ship's superstructure is located forward, with a long flight deck aft. The ship has a small secondary superstructure approximately two-thirds of the way down the flight deck, containing the ship's exhaust funnel. This is used by small helicopters to simulate landing on the flight deck of a destroyer or frigate.

For the 1991 Gulf War Argus was fitted with a fully functional hospital, which has since been modified and extensively augmented with specialist equipment, providing 70 to 100 beds. The ship is equipped with an intensive-care unit, and can provide medical x-ray and CT-scan services. Casualties can be quickly transferred from the deck directly into the assessment area. Since 2009, the ship's role as a Primary Casualty Receiving Ship has been her principal role, although she continues to be used for aviation training.

In 2007 the ship was refitted with upgraded hospital facilities (replacing the forward aircraft lift with a ramp for emergency exit for hospital trollies and patients as well as two 50-man passenger lifts that lead to a new structure erected on the flight deck), generators and aviation systems (the ship had been due to receive an upgrade to its night-vision capabilities enabling the use of WAH-64 Apache helicopters) to provide an operational life (at that time) until 2020.

Argus also had the ability to refuel ships at sea, as exemplified in April 2024 when she replenished RFA Lyme Bay in the Indian Ocean.

== Service history ==
=== 1980s ===
As the MV Contender Bezant, following conversion the ship left Devonport on 20 May 1982 and calling at Charleston, South Carolina en route, arrived at Port William, Falkland Islands on 19 June 1982. She returned to the United Kingdom in August.

=== 1990s ===
Argus entered service with the RFA in 1988, replacing RFA Engadine in the aviation training role. The ship deployed to the Persian Gulf in 1991 for service in the Gulf War (Operation Granby), and later provided humanitarian aid for Kurdish civilians in Operation Haven. Argus also saw service in the Adriatic in 1993 and 1999 supporting British operations in Bosnia and over Kosovo respectively. During this period, Argus operated in part as a LPH. Her unsuitability for this role was a major factor in the commissioning of HMS Ocean. On 2 February 1998, three helicopters based on Argus rescued 12 members of the crew of MV Delfin Mediteraneo from their life rafts when the ship sank in the Atlantic. Normal flying had been abandoned, due to bad weather, but the rescue went ahead in 60 feet (18 m) waves, earning three Air Force Crosses and six Queen's Commendations for Bravery in the Air for the aircrew.

=== 2000s ===
During times of war RFA Argus could act as a floating hospital with two fully equipped wards and mortuary. The hospital was utilised in this way off the coast of Freetown in 2000–01, in support of British operations against the rebel West Side Boys.

A project to replace Argus called the Joint Casualty Treatment Ship (JCTS) was put on hold in December 2001 after passing initial approval. The Integrated Project Team (IPT) managing the project was subsequently disbanded in 2005. Argus was most recently stationed at her home port of Falmouth in Cornwall, England, though being an RFA ship means that she also uses the former naval dockyard on Portland in Dorset, England.

In 2003 Argus was deployed again to the Gulf as a Primary Casualty Reception Ship during Operation Telic. A 33-ship fleet supported a British amphibious assault of the Al-Faw Peninsula.

In 2008 she deployed to the Middle East to act as a platform for Sea King ASaC7 helicopters. On 13 July, the ships in the deployment seized 23 tonnes of narcotics in the Persian Gulf.

=== 2010s ===
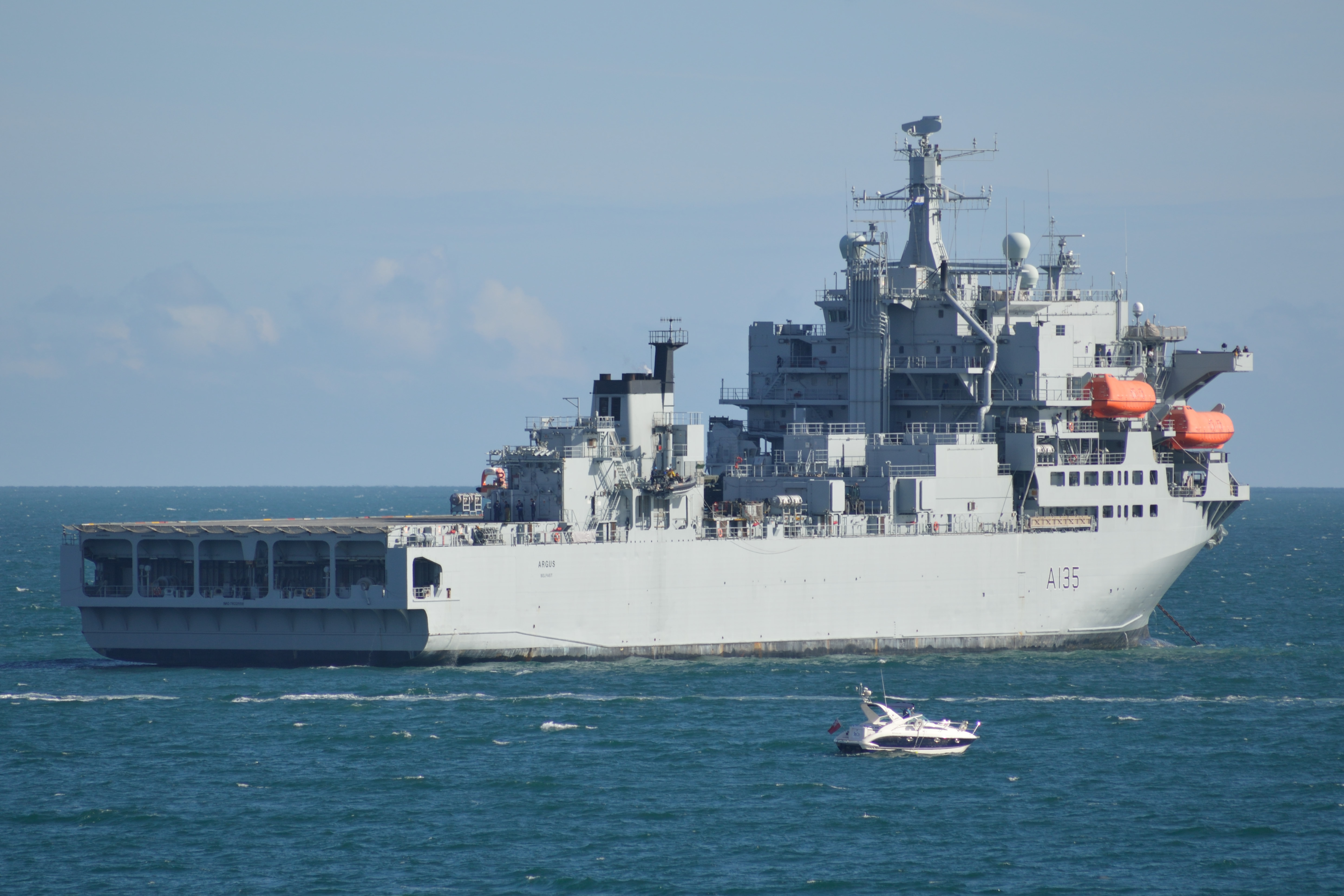
Argus anchored at the 2015 Bournemouth Air Festival

In June 2011, Argus was operating in the Middle East around Yemen. By August she had returned to Falmouth and was filmed for the film World War Z.

In mid-May 2012 the vessel, with embarked forces from the Royal Marines and Fleet Air Arm, including an embarked Super Lynx helicopter and the newly formed Humanitarian and Disaster Relief Team, set sail for North America to support potential humanitarian operations during the hurricane season. Their primary mission was to support the British Overseas Territories should they require assistance in the hurricane season as well as maintaining the constant Royal Navy presence within the wider region. Before commencing her disaster relief mission the ship engaged in multinational exercises and celebrations commemorating the War of 1812 with units from the US Navy as part of OpSail 2012.

In 2013 the ship was used for training with the AgustaWestland Wildcat, the successor to the Lynx.

In 2014 the ship participated in the annual Exercise Joint Warrior, practising Medical Evacuation and Treatment. On 8 October 2014, UK Foreign Secretary Philip Hammond announced that the RFA Argus would travel to Sierra Leone to assist with the 2014 Ebola outbreak. On 30 October of the same year, the vessel docked in Sierra Leone, with three Merlin helicopters embarked. Their work of establishing shore-based medical facilities and transporting aid to outlying areas earned the ship an Admiralty Board Letter of Commendation and 167 Ebola Medals for Service in West Africa were awarded to crew members.

In mid-2017 Argus was host to four Wildcat helicopters from 825 Naval Air Squadron for initial training off the coast of Portugal which lasted for three weeks.

In June 2018, following a year-long refit, she embarked Merlin HC4 helicopters of 845 Naval Air Squadron and Wildcats of 847 NAS which practised amphibious landings in support of exercise Baltic Protector in the Baltic Sea.

=== 2020s ===
In April 2020, the Royal Navy dispatched the Argus to the Caribbean region to support British Overseas Territories, if required, during the COVID-19 pandemic, and in preparation for the upcoming hurricane season. This is contrary to some previous media reports in the tabloid press, which stated that she would be deployed to London to assist with the coronavirus outbreak in the UK.

Argus had been expected to retire from service in 2024. However, in 2022 the Defence Procurement Minister Jeremy Quin indicated that she was likely to be life extended until beyond 2030. Her functions are projected eventually to be taken over by the new Multi Role Support Ships proposed for acquisition in the 2021 defence white paper.

In March 2023, as part of her conversion to the littoral strike role, Argus was fitted with a single Phalanx 20 mm close-in-weapon-system as part of her armament and conducted training with Army Air Corps Apache helicopters. In the autumn of 2023, following intensive maintenance and upgrade for her new role, the ship was expected to deploy east of Suez as the principal unit of Littoral Response Group (South).

In October 2023, Argus began a long-term deployment to the Indian Ocean region in company with the dock landing ship Lyme Bay. For her deployment as part of Littoral Response Group (South), she reportedly embarked three Merlin Mk4 helicopters. It was subsequently indicated by the Government that she was to remain, for a time, in the Eastern Mediterranean with Lyme Bay as part of a broader British regional presence given the outbreak of the Gaza war.

In February 2024, Argus briefly operated under the authority of Naval Striking Forces NATO (STRIKFORNATO) in the Eastern Mediterranean alongside the USS BATAAN Amphibious Readiness Group, consisting of USS Bataan (LHD-5), USS Carter Hall (LSD-50), USS Mesa Verde (LPD-19), and USS Arleigh Burke (DDG-51) as part of a NATO transfer of authority (TOA) exercise.

In March 2024, maintenance of Argus and Lyme Bay was undertaken at the Larsen & Toubro's Kattupalli Shipyard in India. This was the first time that a Royal Navy ship had arrived in an Indian shipyard for maintenance. The ships, escorted by HMS Diamond, had transited through the Red Sea to reach India. In April 2024, LRG(S) participated in Maritime Partnership Exercise with Indian Navy's Eastern Fleet in the Indian Ocean. The exercise included stealth frigate INS Sahyadri. The tasks conducted in the exercise included tactical manoeuvres, boarding ops, surface engagement against simulated asymmetric threats, cross deck visits & cross deck helo ops. In May 2024, Argus entered dry dock for additional maintenance, this time in Singapore.

In July 2024, both Argus and Lyme Bay deployed to Australia for exercise "Predators Run" which included troops from 40 Commando Royal Marines, and also involved US and Australian forces. In September 2024, Argus began transit back to the U.K. visiting Cape Town en route. She arrived in the UK in early October to begin refit which was anticipated to last until March 2025. It was planned that Argus would again deploy east of Suez in 2025 to join up with the UK Carrier Strike Group later in the deployment.

In July 2025 it was reported that the Maritime and Coastguard Agency and Lloyd's Register had deemed Argus unsafe to sail, meaning that, at minimum, further work would be required to render the 45-year old vessel seaworthy. By the end of the year, it was reported that she would likely be retired from service. She was confirmed for scrapping in February 2026. As of April 2026, she is laid up on the River Fal.

== See also ==
- List of miscellaneous ships of the Royal Fleet Auxiliary
