= Tide-class replenishment oiler =

Class of six replenishment oilers of the Royal Fleet Auxiliary

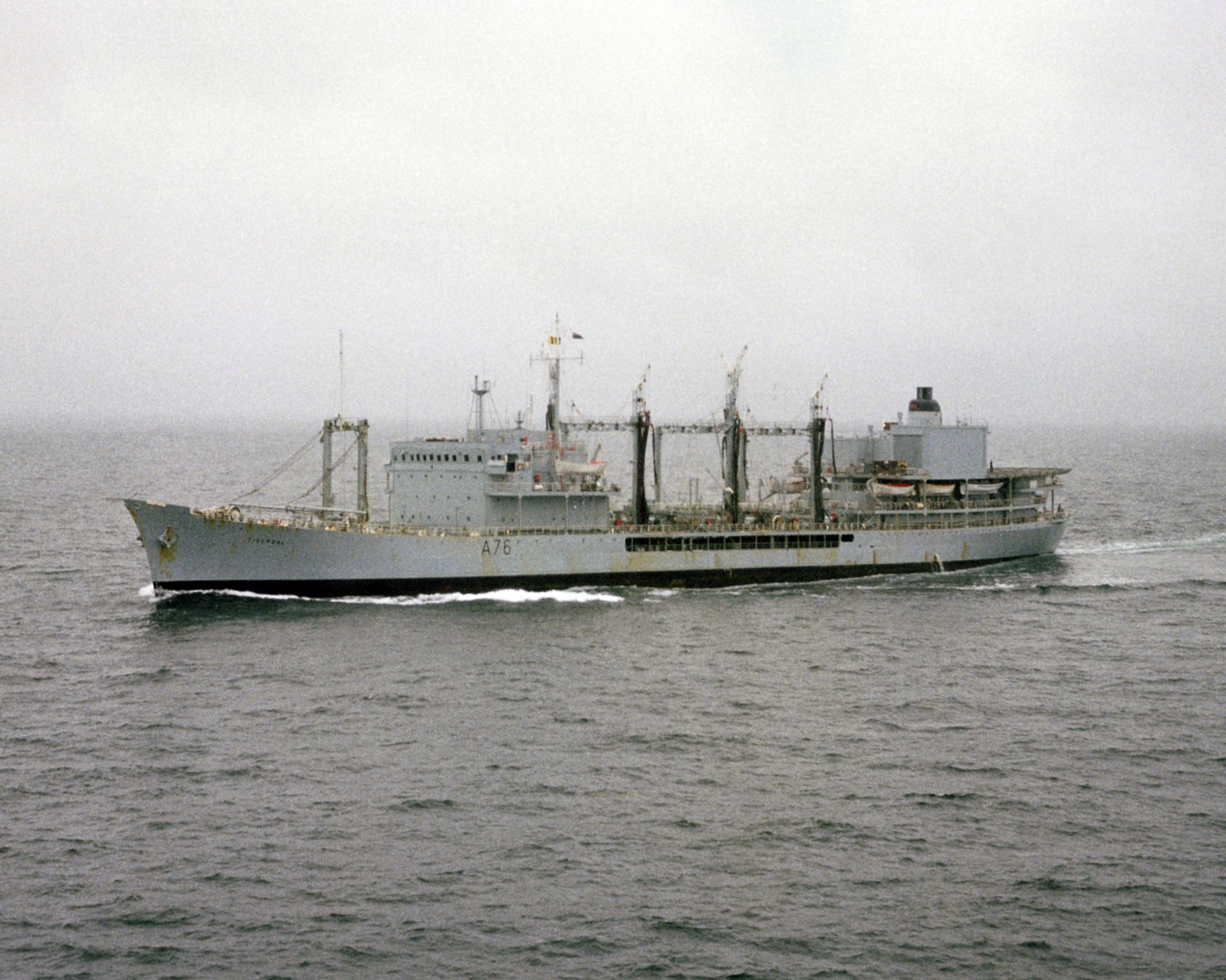
- RFA Tidepool (A76) underway

Class overview
- Name: Tide class
- Operators: Royal Fleet Auxiliary; Royal Australian Navy; Chilean Navy
- Preceded by: RFA Olna
- Succeeded by: Ol class
- Built: 1953–1963
- In commission: 1955–1992
- Planned: 4 + 2
- Completed: 6
- Retired: 6

General characteristics
- Type: Replenishment oiler
- Displacement: Early Tide class; 26,000 long tons (26,417 t) full load; Later Tide class; 27,400 long tons (27,840 t)
- Length: 583 ft (178 m)
- Beam: 71 ft (22 m)
- Draught: 32 ft (9.8 m)
- Propulsion: 2 × Parmetrada steam turbines; Early Tide Class; 3 × Babcock & Wilcox Boilers; Later Tide Class; 2 × Foster Wheeler Watertube steam boilers; Double reduction gearbox, single shaft
- Speed: 17 knots (20 mph; 31 km/h)
- Complement: 90 (RFA)

The Tide class was a series of six replenishment oilers used by the Royal Fleet Auxiliary (RFA), the naval auxiliary fleet of the United Kingdom, the Royal Australian Navy (RAN), and the Chilean Navy.

The class was based on RFA Olna, which had served with the British Pacific Fleet during the Second World War. Three ships were laid down for the RFA in 1953, with a fourth being ordered by the RAN at the same time. Two more ships, built for the RFA to a modified design, were launched in 1962.

Upon completion, the RANs Tide Austral could not be accepted into service because of manpower and financial difficulties. The ship was instead loaned to the RFA from 1955 until 1962, when she was returned to the RAN and commissioned as HMAS Supply. She was 'paid off' in 1985.

The first three ships were removed from service and scrapped during the late 1970s. The two modified ships, Tidespring and Tidepool saw service in the Falklands War, after which Tidepool was sold to the Chilean Navy and renamed Almirante Jorge Montt. Tidespring remained with the RFA and was scrapped in 1992. Supply remained with the RAN until 1985.

== History ==
The original four ‘early Tide class’ ships were the initial tailor-made fleet replenishment tankers, deliberately designed by the Admiralty for continuous fleet aid for the Royal Navy. The designs were developed from first hand knowledge gained from everyday activities done on vessels such as former Kriegsmarine combination oiler and supply vessel Northmark, the former fleet tanker Olna and some of the Wave-class replenishment oilers.

This ships served around the world and set the standard for future RFA operations. Three of the vessels were close to Suez when the 1956 Crisis started. One of the ‘Tides’ was low on fuel and returned to Malta as instructed, to refuel. However, it was the wrong ship that went back. It was realised that the names Tiderace and Tiderange were too similar they were changed to Tideflow and Tidesurge respectively in 1958.

The two later ships, built at the beginning of the 1960s, were a further development of the class. These two were more advanced in terms of replenishment and were highly effective, even under severe operational environments.

== Design ==
Tide Austral, Tideflow (ex-Tiderace), Tidesurge (ex-Tiderange) and Tidereach were planned with a normal complement of 100 Royal Fleet Auxiliary personnel. They had the latest abeam rigs with automatic tension winches and an astern fuelling rig. These four ships were able to store 8,500 tons of Furnace Fuel Oil, 4,600 tons of diesel oil and 1,900 tons of avcat.

Tide Austral was built by Harland & Wolff in Belfast, she was laid down on 5 August 1952 and launched on 1 September 1954. Tideflow (ex-Tiderace), Tidesurge (ex-Tiderange) and Tidereach were built in the north east of England by J.L. Thompson and Sons, James Laing & Sons and Swan Hunter respectively. These three were laid down between June and August 1953 and were launched between June and August 1954.

Tidespring and Tidepool were designed around a normal complement of 110 Royal Fleet Auxiliary personnel with provision for up to 24 Royal Navy personnel. They were designed with abeam replenishment at sea rigs, which had automatic tensioning winches and they had an astern fuelling rig. Tidespring and Tidepool were also fitted with a 50 x 70 ft helicopter deck, designed to be capable of handling the Royal Navy's Westland Wessex helicopters which were used at the time, and later Westland Sea King helicopters. They had hangar facilities for a single helicopter and could support aviation refuelling and defuelling. These vessels were built to carry 9,500 tons of Furnace Fuel Oil, 5,500 tons of diesel oil and 2,000 tons of avcat and the forward hold could take dry cargo.

The construction of Tidespring and Tidepool was carried out by the shipbuilder Hawthorn Leslie, at Hebburn. Tidespring was laid down on 24 July 1961 and launched the following year on 3 May 1962, and Tidepool was laid down on 14 December 1961 and launched one year later on 11 December 1962. They displaced, fully loaded, 27,400 tons, were just under 584 ft in overall length and were capable of 17 knots.

== Construction programme ==
Tide-class replenishment oilers
Early Tide class
Name	Pennant	Builder	Laid down	Launched	Completed	Out of service	Fate
Tide Austral	A99	Harland and Wolff, Belfast	5 August 1952	1 September 1954	28 May 1955	15 August 1962	To Royal Australian Navy as HMAS Supply
Tidereach	A96	Swan Hunter & Wigham Richardson, Wallsend	2 June 1953	2 June 1954	30 August 1955	March 1978	Broken up at Bilbao, 1979
Tideflow (ex-Tiderace)	A97	J.L. Thompson and Sons, Sunderland	30 August 1953	30 August 1954	24 January 1956	November 1975	Broken up at Bilbao, 1976
Tidesurge (ex-Tiderange)	A98	Sir James Laing & Sons, Sunderland	1 July 1953	1 July 1954	26 March 1956	May 1976	Broken up at Valencia, 1977
Later Tide class
Tidespring	A75	Hawthorn Leslie, Hebburn	24 July 1961	3 May 1962	18 January 1963	13 December 1991	Broken up at Alang, 1992
Tidepool	A76	Hawthorn Leslie, Hebburn	14 December 1961	11 December 1962	28 June 1963	13 August 1982	To Chilean Navy as Almirante Jorge Montt, 1982

== Decommissioning and fate ==
On 31 May 1962 at Southampton, RFA Tide Austral went into refit, and then on 15 August she left RFA service and was passed to the Royal Australian Navy, where she was commissioned HMAS Tide Austral. Her name was then later changed to HMAS Supply, on 7 September.

Following nineteen years service, Tideflow was laid up at HMMB Devonport during November 1975 and she was added to the 'Disposal List' on 8 January 1976. Just under a fortnight later, she was advertised for sale in The Times newspaper, on 17 January. She was later towed out of Devonport on 4 May and arrived six days later at Bilbao, Spain, for breaking.

Tidesurge was also laid up at HMNB Portsmouth, on 23 June 1976. In February 1977 she was put up for sale by the Board of Trade. She was towed out of Portsmouth for the breakers, destined for Valencia, Spain, on 19 April 1977.

On 5 June 1978 Tidereach was laid up in Portsmouth Harbour after she had given twenty years service. She was sold the following February to a company in Rotterdam, in the Netherlands, but then resold to a Spanish company for breaking. On 16 March 1979 she was towed out of Portsmouth, arriving at Bilbao, Spain, four days later for disposal.

Tidepool left HMNB Portsmouth on 22 February 1982, after nineteen years in the RFA, after being purchased by Chile for £1.8m. She arrived at Arica, Chile, for handover to the Chilean Navy, however, she was recalled to the Royal Fleet Auxiliary on 4 April, due to the Falklands War. She was eventually transferred to the Chilean Navy on 13 August 1982 at Talcahuano, Chile, where she was renamed Almirante Jorge Montt (AO 52).

Tidespring arrived at HMNB Portsmouth to destore, was then laid up and also added to the 'Disposal List' during December 1991. The following year, in March 1992, she was towed from Portsmouth to the breakers, arriving in July at Alang, India, where the disposal work commenced.

== Gallery ==
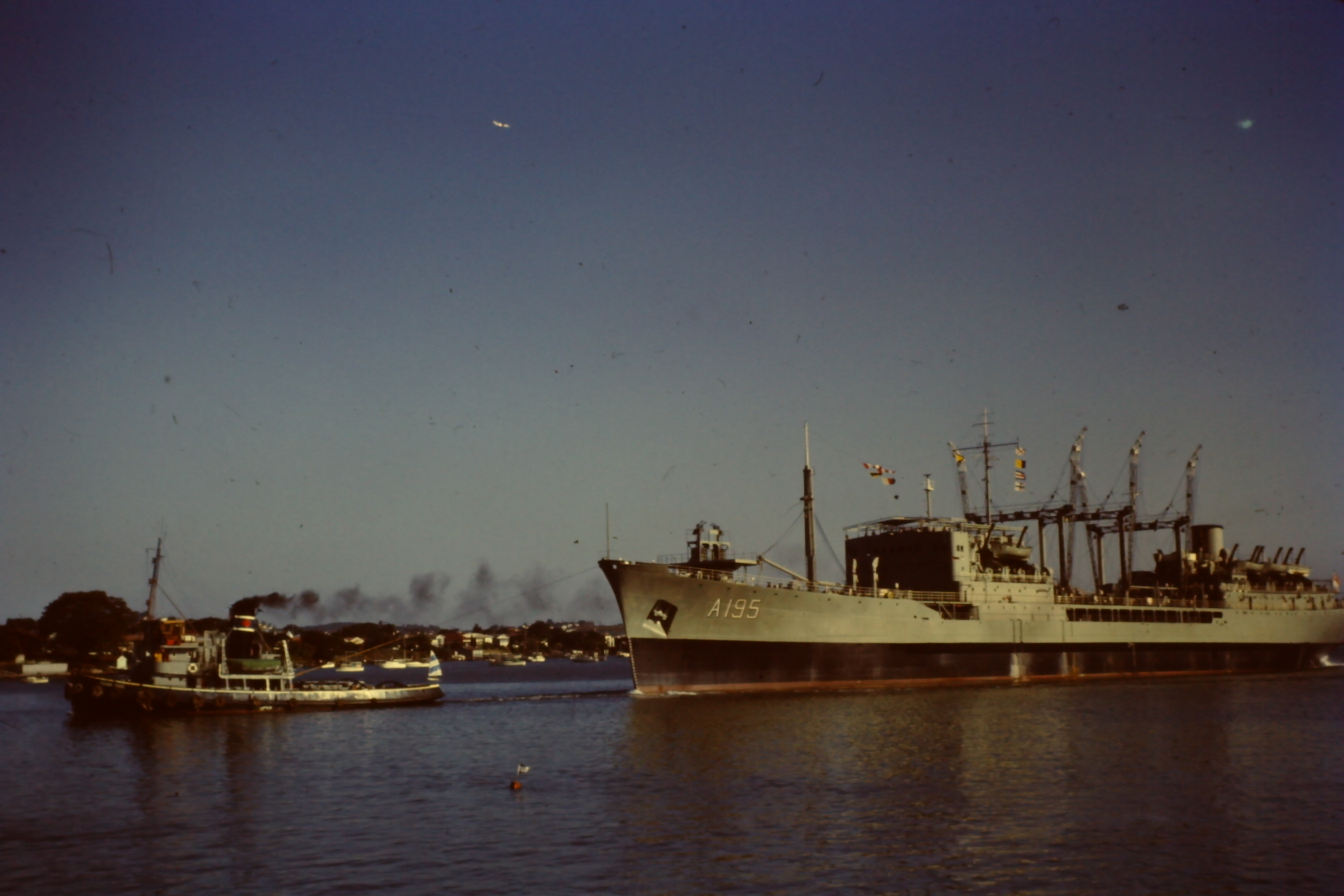
HMAS Supply (A195) under tow in the Brisbane River, in late 1967

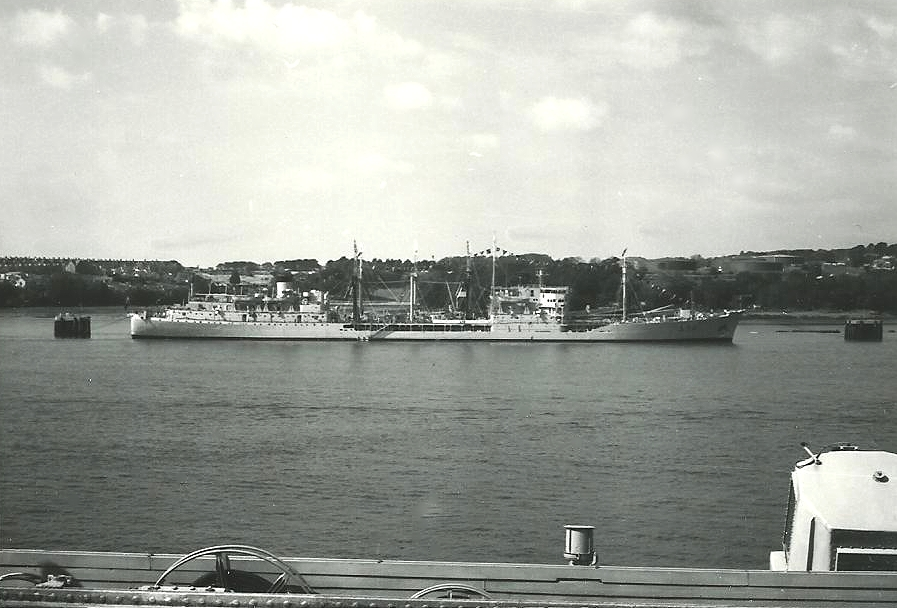
RFA Tidereach (A96), at Devonport Dockyard, Plymouth Navy Day, August 1977

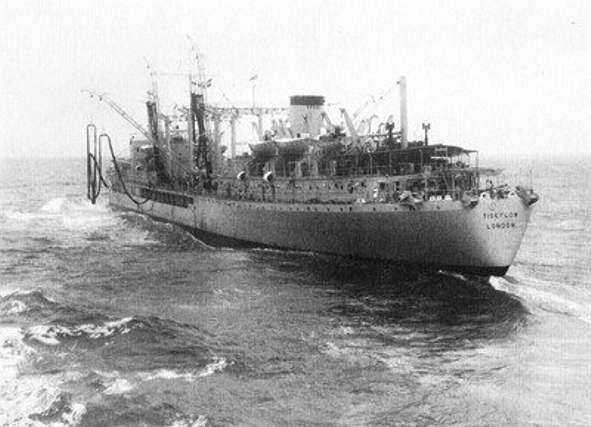
RFA Tideflow (A97) underway during NATO exercise Riptide III, in the Mediterranean Sea, in August 1962

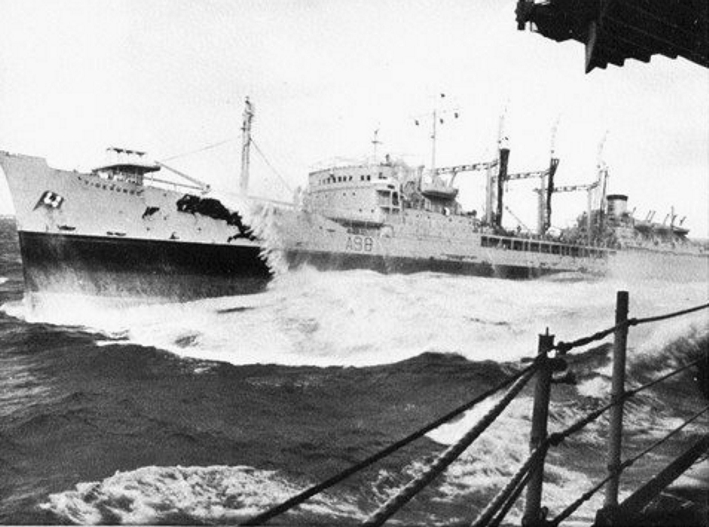
RFA Tidesurge (A98) refuels the US Navy aircraft carrier USS Forrestal on 25 August 1967, in heavy seas between Madagascar and the Cape of Good Hope

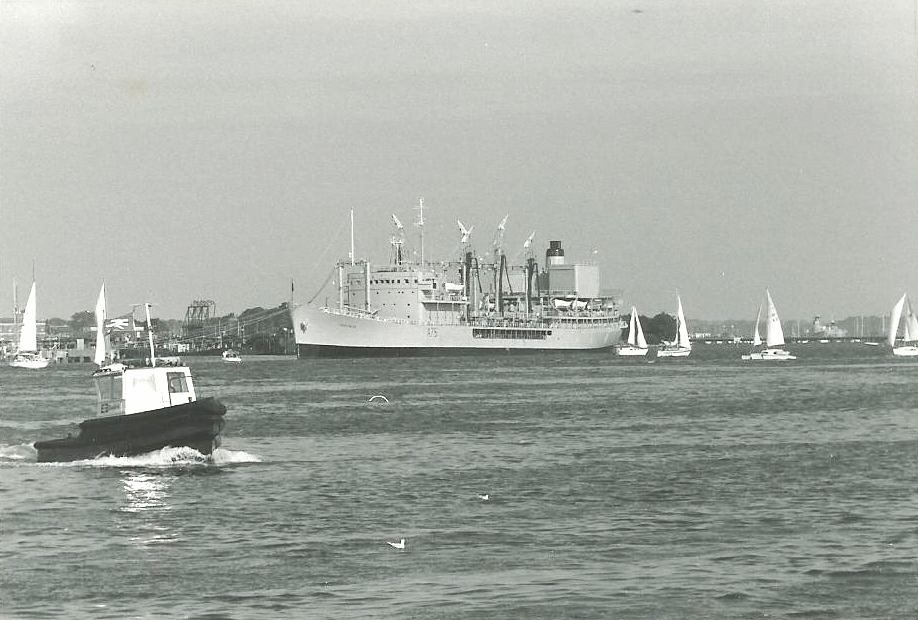
RFA Tidespring (A75), at the Portsmouth Navy Day, August 1980

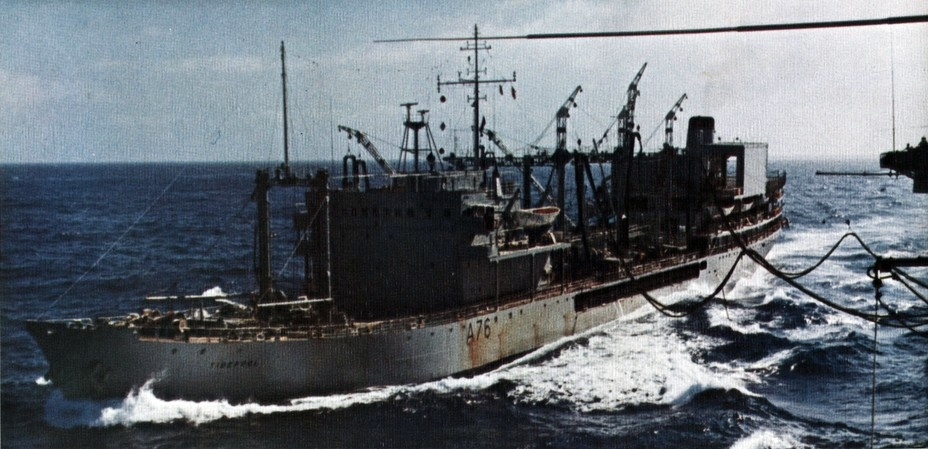
RFA Tidepool (A76) refuelling the US Navy aircraft carrier USS Saratoga

== See also ==
- List of replenishment ships of the Royal Fleet Auxiliary
- List of Royal Australian Navy ships
- List of decommissioned ships of the Chilean Navy
- MARS tanker – new class of RFA replenishment ships that will reuse some of the Tide names
