= RFA Salvigil =

King Salvor class salvage vessel of the Royal Fleet Auxiliary

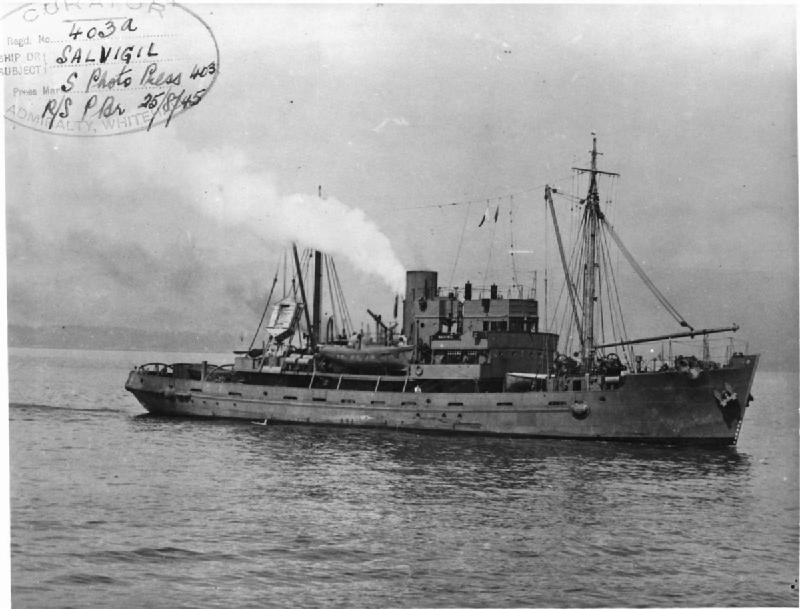

History

United Kingdom
- Name: RFA Salvigil
- Ordered: 7 June 1943
- Builder: Wm. Simons & Co. Ltd., Renfrew
- Yard number: 772
- Laid down: 23 June 1944
- Launched: 30 April 1945
- Commissioned: 23 May 1945
- Decommissioned: 1965
- Fate: Sold, May 1965; Scrapped, October 1972

General characteristics
- Class & type: King Salvor class salvage vessel
- Displacement: 1,780 long tons (1,809 t) full load
- Length: 214 ft 4 in (65.33 m)
- Beam: 37 ft 11 in (11.56 m)
- Draught: 15 ft 3 in (4.65 m)
- Propulsion: 2 × 3-cylinder triple expansion steam engines
- Speed: 12 knots (22 km/h; 14 mph)
- Complement: 72
- Armament: 4 × 20 mm AA guns (4×1)

RFA Salvigil (A501) was a salvage vessel of the Royal Fleet Auxiliary.

Salvigil was built by Wm. Simons & Co. Ltd. of Renfrew, launched on 30 April 1945, and commissioned on 23 May 1945. Decommissioned in 1968, the ship was sold into commercial service in May 1968 and was renamed Nisos Salamis. Scrapping began at Perama on 12 October 1972.
