= RFA Tideflow =

1956 Tide-class replenishment oiler of the Royal Fleet Auxiliary

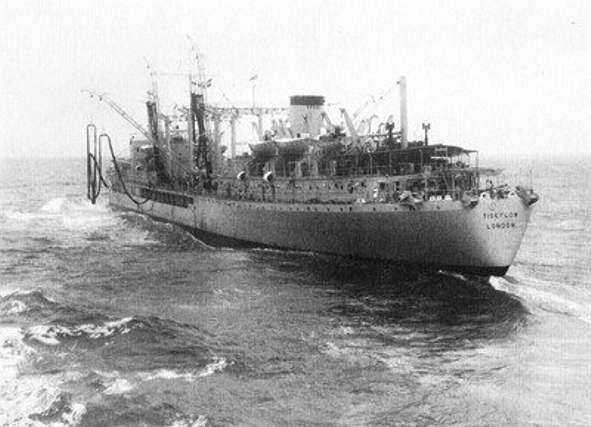
- RFA Tideflow (A97) in August 1962

History

United Kingdom
- Name: RFA Tideflow
- Laid down: 30 August 1953
- Launched: 30 August 1954 as Tiderace
- In service: 25 January 1956
- Out of service: November 1975
- Renamed: 28 June 1958 Tideflow
- Identification: IMO number: 5360998; Pennant number: A97
- Fate: Scrapped, 1976

General characteristics
- Class & type: Tide-class replenishment oiler
- Displacement: 26,000 long tons (26,417 t)
- Length: 583 ft 4 in (177.80 m)
- Beam: 71 ft 4 in (21.74 m)
- Draught: 32 ft 1 in (9.78 m)
- Propulsion: 2 × Parmetrada steam turbines; 3 × Babcock & Wilcox boilers
- Speed: 17 knots (20 mph; 31 km/h)
- Complement: 90 RFA

RFA Tideflow (A97) was a Tide-class replenishment oiler of the Royal Fleet Auxiliary (RFA), the naval auxiliary fleet of the United Kingdom. She entered service with the RFA in 1956. She was originally named Tiderace, but was later renamed Tideflow in 1958 to avoid confusion with other members of the class. She was taken out of service in 1976 and scrapped.

== Design and construction ==
Tideflow had a normal complement of 100 Royal Fleet Auxiliary personnel. Her design incorporated the latest abeam rigs with automatic tension winches and included an astern fuelling rig. The ship was able to carry 8,500 tons of Furnace Fuel Oil, 4,600 tons of diesel oil and 1,900 tons of avcat.

The construction of Tideflow was carried out in the north east of England by J.L. Thompson and Sons. She was laid down on 30 August 1953 and was launched the following year, on 30 August 1954. She displaced fully loaded, 26,000 tons, was just over 583 ft in overall length and was capable of 17 knots.

== Decommissioning and fate ==
Following nineteen years service, Tideflow was laid up at HMMB Devonport during November 1975 and she was added to the 'Disposal List' on 8 January 1976. Just under a fortnight later, she was advertised for sale in The Times newspaper, on 17 January. She was towed out of Devonport on 4 May and arrived six days later at Bilbao, Spain, for breaking.
