= RFA Maine (1924) =

1924–1954 steam ship

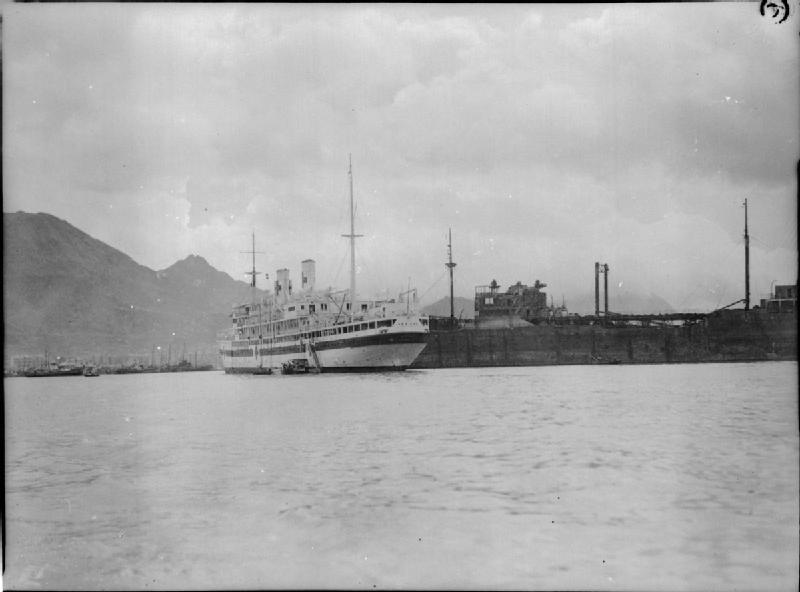
- RFA Maine c. 1943

History
- Name: SS Leonardo da Vinci (1925-43); SS Empire Clyde (1943-47); RFA Empire Clyde (1947-48); RFA Maine (1948-54)
- Namesake: Leonardo da Vinci
- Owner: Società di Navigazione Transatlantica Italiana (1925-37; Lloyd Triestine (1937-41); Ministry of War Transport (1941-45); Ministry of Transport (1945-48); Admiralty (1948-54)
- Operator: Società di Navigazione Transatlantica Italiana (1925-37; Lloyd Triestine (1937-41); City Line (1941-48); Royal Fleet Auxiliary (1948-54)
- Port of registry: (Italy) Genoa (1925-41); (United Kingdom) Mombasa (1941-43); (United Kingdom) London (1943-48); (United Kingdom) Royal Fleet Auxiliary (1948-54)
- Builder: Ansaldo, Muggiano, Italy
- Launched: 28 December 1924
- Acquired: by capture, 1941
- Commissioned: 1947, as RFA Empire Clyde
- Decommissioned: 1954
- Identification: Code Letters NVJA (1925-34); Code Letters IBPS (1934-41); Code Letters VRTV (1941-43); Code Letters GCFB (1943-54); Italian Official Number 1306 (1924-41); United Kingdom Official Number 159356 (1941-54)
- Honours and awards: Korea (1950)
- Fate: Scrapped, 1954

General characteristics
- Type: Ocean liner (1925-41); Hospital ship (1941-54)
- Tonnage: 7,432 GRT; 4,096 NRT
- Length: 427 ft 1 in (130.18 m)
- Beam: 52 ft 5 in (15.98 m)
- Depth: 36 ft 0 in (10.97 m)
- Installed power: 6 steam turbines
- Propulsion: 2 screw propellers

RFA Maine was a 7,432 GRT hospital ship which was built in 1924 as the ocean liner Leonardo da Vinci by SA Ansaldo, La Spezia, Italy for the Società di Navigazione Transatlantica Italiana. In 1941, she was captured by the British at Kismayu, Italian Somaliland. Declared a prize of war, she was passed to the Ministry of War Transport (MoWT) and renamed Empire Clyde, serving as a hospital ship for the British Army during the Second World War. In 1948, ownership was passed to the Admiralty and she entered service with the Royal Fleet Auxiliary as RFA Maine. She served during the Korean War and was scrapped in 1954.

== Description ==
The ship was built by SA Ansaldo, La Spezia, Italy. She was launched on 28 December 1924.

The ship was 427 feet 1 inch (130.18 m) long, with a beam of 52 feet 5 inches (15.98 m) and a depth of 36 feet 0 inches (10.97 m). She had a GRT of 7,432 and a NRT of 4,096. She was propelled by six steam turbines, double reduction geared, driving twin screw propellers. The turbines were built by Ansaldo Sampierdarena.

== History ==
Leonardo da Vinci was built for Società di Navigazione Transatlantica Italiana. Her port of registry was Genoa. The Italian Official Number 1306 and Code Letters NVJA were allocated. In 1934, her Code Letters were changed to IBPS. In December 1929, Leonardo da Vinci was caught in a storm off Cape Finisterre, Spain whilst transporting a number of valuable Italian works of art which were to be exhibited at Burlington House, Piccadilly, London. She was accompanied on her voyage by the Marina Militare tug Teso. The cargo was insured for £14,000,000. Works of art on board included the painting The Birth of Venus by Botticelli, the three Davids, sculptures by Donatello, Michelangelo and Verrocchio. Another sculpture was Virgin and Child by Jacopo della Quercia. Leonardo da Vinci departed London on 12 April 1930 to return the artworks to Italy.

During the Second Italo-Abyssinian War, Leonardo da Vinci was used as a troopship in March 1935. On 28 February, Leonardo da Vinci was in collision with Viminale, which dragged her anchor during a storm at Messina, Italy. Damage to Leonardo da Vinci was slight. In 1937, Leonardo da Vinci was sold to Lloyd Triestino, Trieste. On 14 February 1941, she was captured by HMS Shropshire. At the time, Leonardo da Vinci was at Kismayu, Italian Somaliland. She was passed to the MoWT as a war prize. Her port of registry was changed to Mombasa, Kenya, under the British Flag. The Code Letters VRTV and United Kingdom Official Number 159356 were allocated. She was placed under the management of the City Line.

Leonardo da Vinci was a member of Convoy HX 255, which departed New York on 2 September 1943 and arrived at Liverpool on 16 September. She was carrying general cargo and was bound for Glasgow. Later in 1943, Leonardo da Vinci was renamed Empire Clyde in line with the 'Empire' naming practice for captured vessels. Her Code Letters were changed to GCFB and her port of registry was changed to London. She was converted to a hospital ship for the British Army.

In 1947 she was commissioned as RFA Empire Clyde, with a Royal Navy medical team aboard. In 1948 she was renamed RFA Maine, the fourth Royal Fleet Auxiliary ship to bear that name. When the Korean War broke out, Maine was initially the only hospital ship serving in the area. On 14 July 1950. Maine arrived at Pusan, South Korea, from where she ran a service carrying casualties to Fukuoka, Japan. On 10 October 1951, Maine lost a propeller whilst passing through the Shimonoseki Straits. USS Reclaimer and USS Yuma took her under tow. On 1 December 1952, USS Ashtabula caught fire at Sasebo harbour, Japan. USS Ajax was damaged. Maine treated casualties from these ships. For her service, Maine was awarded a Korean War battle honour. Maine was scrapped at Hong Kong in April 1954.
