= RFA Wave Ruler (A390) =

2003 Wave-class fast fleet tanker of the Royal Fleet Auxiliary

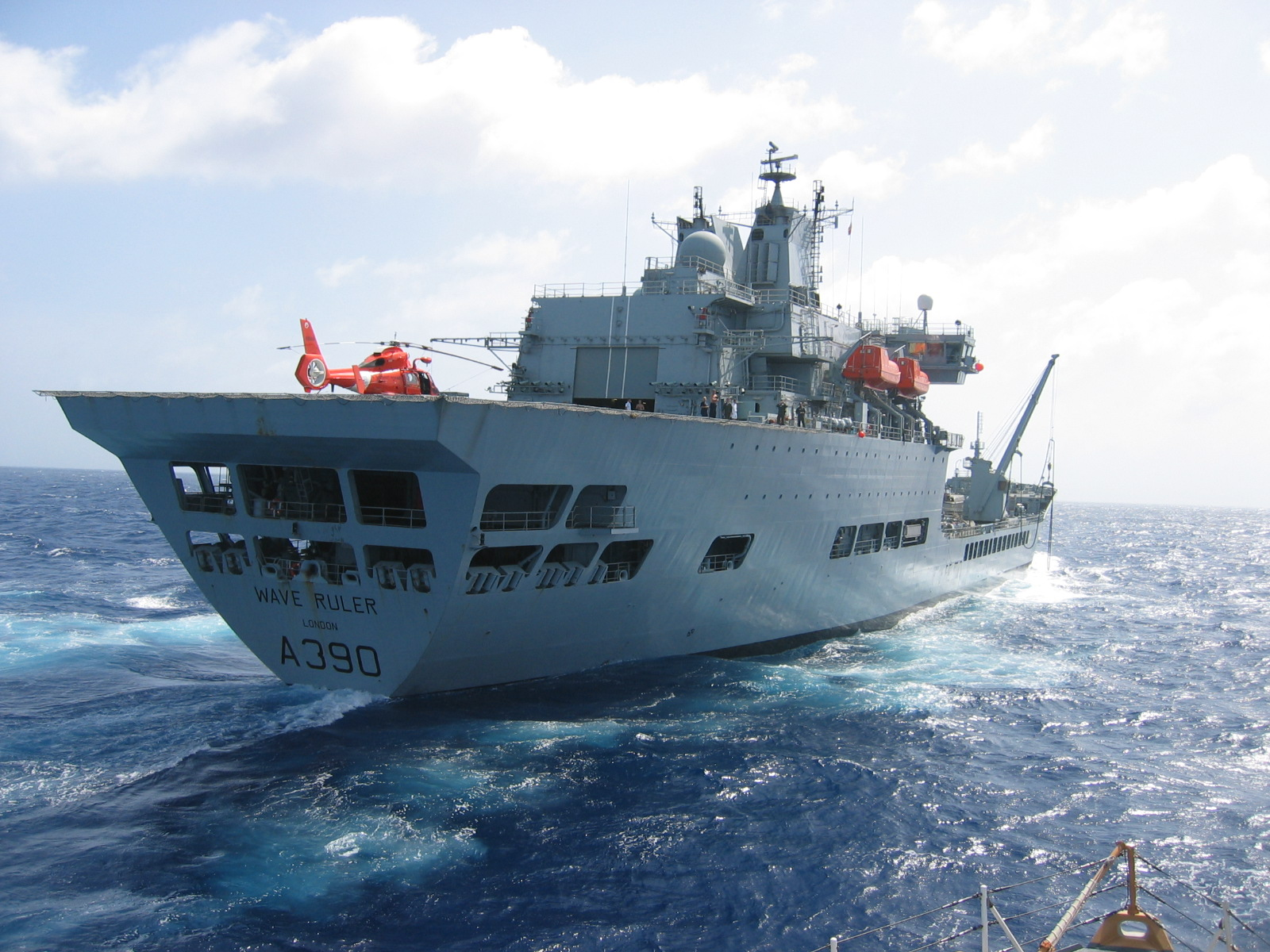
- Wave Ruler underway with a United States Coast Guard Eurocopter HH-65 Dolphin helicopter embarked

History

United Kingdom
- Name: RFA Wave Ruler
- Operator: Royal Fleet Auxiliary
- Ordered: 12 March 1997
- Builder: Kvaerner Govan; BAE Systems Marine
- Launched: 9 February 2001
- In service: 27 April 2003
- Out of service: March 2025
- Home port: HMNB Devonport
- Identification: IMO number: 9168609; MMSI number: 235519000; Callsign: GCVR; Pennant number A390
- Status: Extended readiness (uncrewed reserve)
- Badge

General characteristics
- Class & type: Wave-class tanker
- Displacement: 31,500 tonnes approx
- Length: 196.5 m (644 ft 8 in)
- Beam: 28.25 m (92 ft 8 in)
- Draught: 9.97 m (32 ft 9 in)
- Propulsion: Diesel-electric: 4 × Wartsila 12V 32E/GECLM diesel generators 25,514 metric horsepower (18.76 MW); 2 × GEC Alstom motors with Cegelec variable speed converters 19,040 metric horsepower (14 MW); 1 × shaft; 18t thrust electric Kamewa bow thruster and 12t thrust electric stern thruster, both powered by Cegelec variable speed drives and motors
- Speed: 18 knots (33 km/h; 21 mph)
- Range: 10,000 nmi (19,000 km; 12,000 mi) at 15 knots (28 km/h; 17 mph)
- Capacity: 16,000 m^{3} of liquids (of which 3,000 m^{3} aviation fuel & 380 m^{3} fresh water); 125 tonnes of lubricating oil; 500 m^{3} of solids; 150 tonnes of fresh food in eight 20 ft refrigerated container units.
- Complement: 80 Royal Fleet Auxiliary personnel with provision for 22 Royal Navy personnel for helicopter and weapons systems operations
- Sensors & processing systems: Surface search: E/F band; Navigation: KH 1077, I-band; IFF: Type 1017
- Electronic warfare & decoys: Sea Gnat decoy launcher system
- Armament: 2 × DS30B 30 mm cannon; 2 × 7.62 mm Mk.44 miniguns (retired 2023); 5 × 7.62 mm L7 machine guns; 2 × Vulcan Phalanx CIWS (all weapons removed given uncrewed reserve status)
- Aircraft carried: 1 × Merlin helicopter with full hangar facilities

RFA Wave Ruler is a Wave-class fast fleet tanker of the Royal Fleet Auxiliary (RFA) of the United Kingdom tasked with providing fuel, food, fresh water, ammunition and other supplies to Royal Navy vessels around the world.

Wave Ruler was built by Kvaerner Govan (after 1999, BAE Systems Marine) and launched in 2001. She was accepted into service in 2003 and is the second ship to bear this name in RFA service. Wave Ruler and her sister Wave Knight, were designed to replace Olna and Olwen, two 36,000-ton Ol-class fast fleet tankers which were built at Swan Hunter and Hawthorn Leslie in the 1960s.

Wave Ruler was the last tanker commissioned into the RFA until RFA Tidespring became operational in late 2017.

== Design and description ==
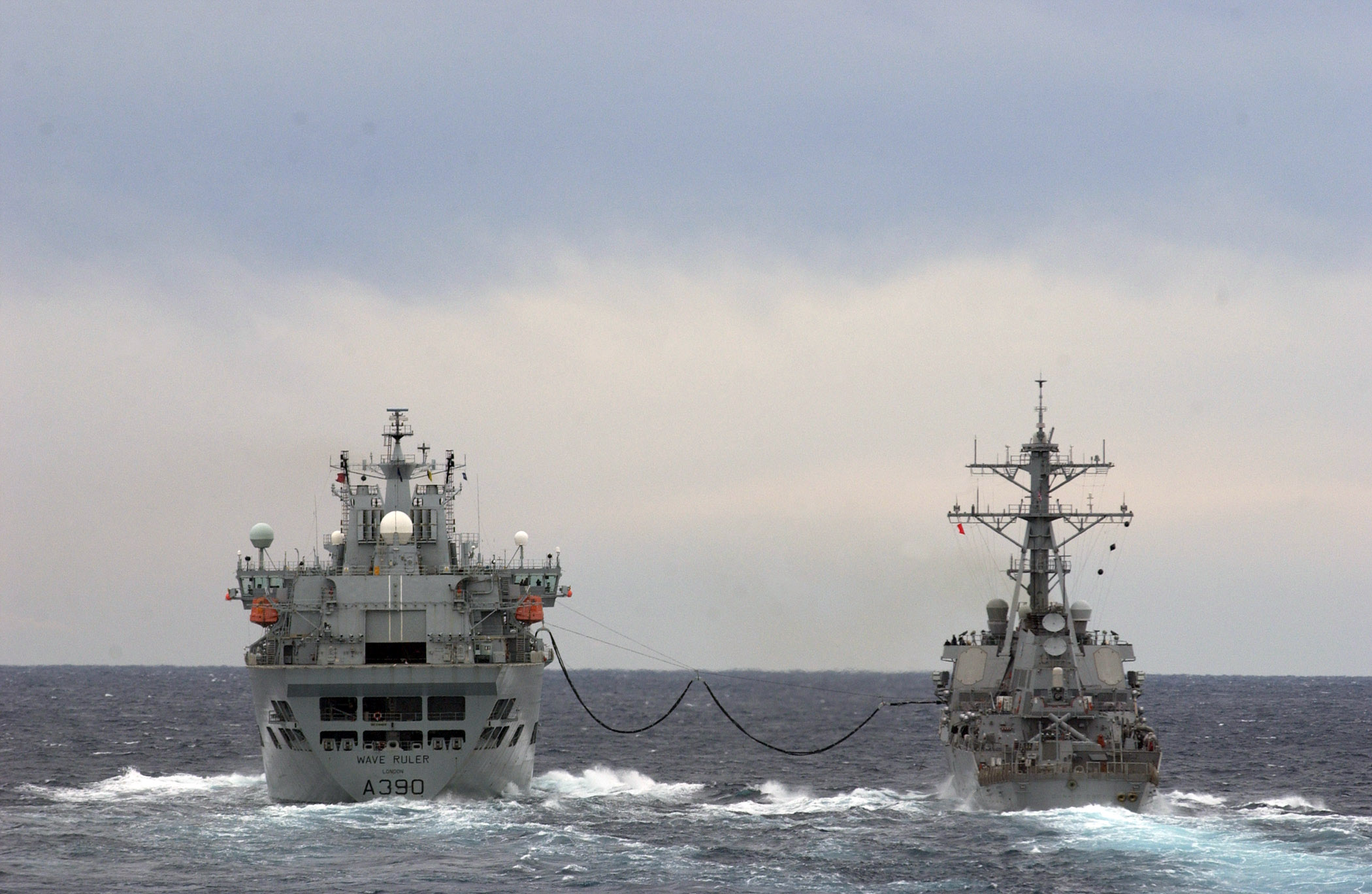
Wave Ruler refueling USS Donald Cook in the Atlantic, 2007

Wave Ruler has a standard crew of 80 Royal Fleet Auxiliary personnel with provision for a further 22 Royal Navy personnel to conduct helicopter and weapons systems operations. She carries a full medical team and sick bay and is capable of distributing 2,000 emergency relief packages in times of crisis.

The ship has the capability to supply fuel and other liquid cargo to vessels using replenishment rigs on port and starboard beams and through a Hudson reel-type stern rig. When providing support for amphibious operations, Wave Ruler is also able to deliver fuel to dracones positioned alongside. In addition to fuel, the ship carries ammunition and other stores which can be transferred while underway. She can operate a Merlin HM1 helicopter, or other helicopters of similar size, from a hangar and flight deck at the stern.

== Operational history ==
=== 2003–2010 ===
September 2004 saw Wave Ruler deployed to the Caribbean to provide hurricane relief operations.

In 2006 the ship carried out three major cocaine seizures at sea. In September it recovered £64m of cocaine from an estimated cargo of £500m, after the crew of the fishing boat carrying the drugs set it on fire. On 2 November the ship and its accompanying Royal Marines captured 3 tonnes (3.0 long tons; 3.3 short tons) of cocaine worth £300m. On 29 November it seized a further 2.9 tonnes (2.9 long tons; 3.2 short tons), again from a fishing boat. All the raids took place in the Caribbean.

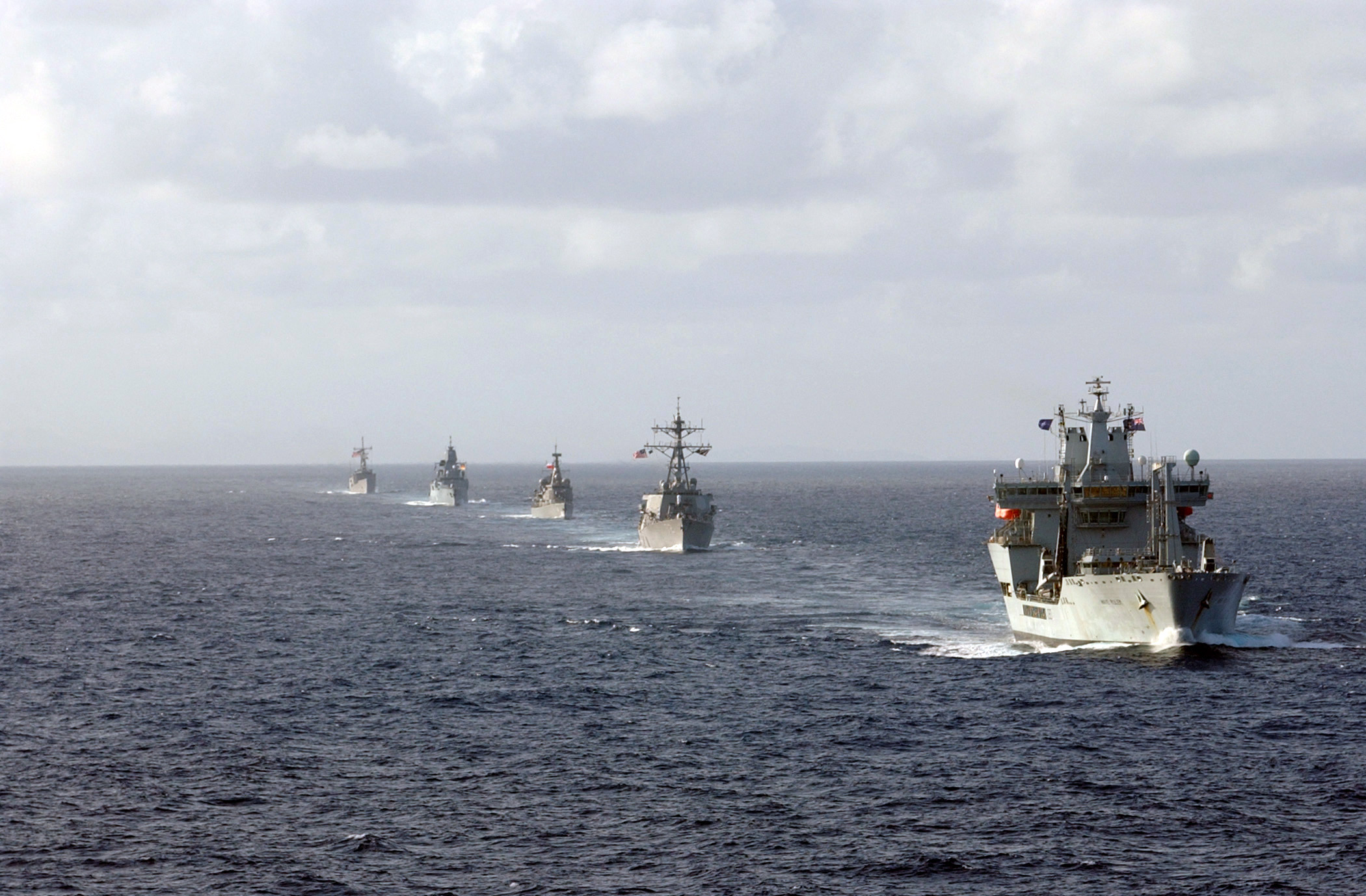
Wave Ruler (foreground), USS Mahan, Almirante Latorre, Sachsen, and USS Samuel B. Roberts navigate together in formation during an exercise.

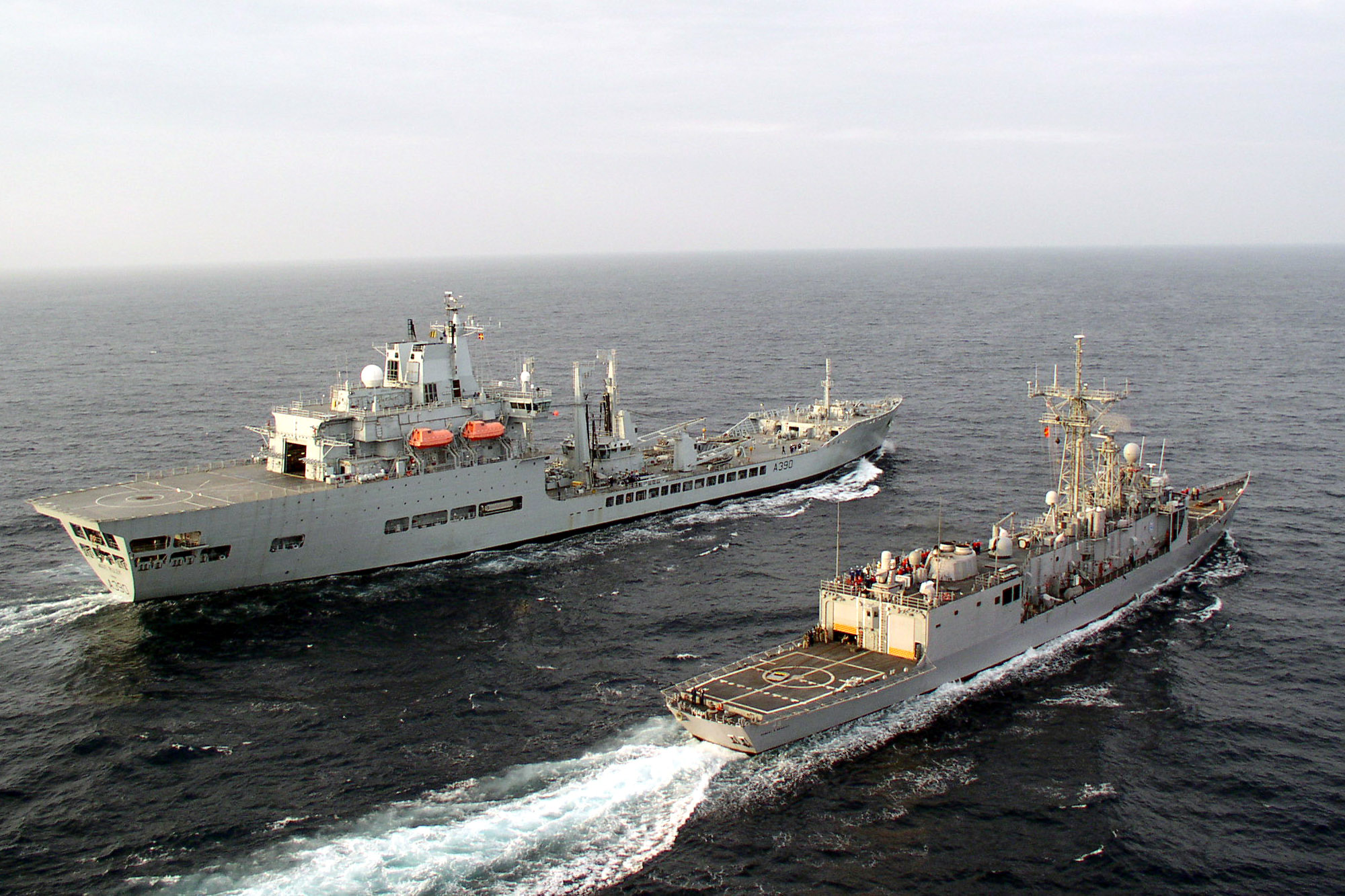
Wave Ruler (background) refuels USS Robert G. Bradley in the Pacific Ocean

On 31 August 2008 Wave Ruler was dispatched with HMS Iron Duke to assist relief efforts in the Caribbean for the Atlantic Hurricane Gustav. The vessels distributed food, water and first aid supplies to victims of the disaster as well as providing support restoring local infrastructure. On 3 October 2008 the ship docked in Havana, Cuba. This was only the second time since the country's revolution 50 years earlier that a Royal Navy ship had visited the country. The five-day stay was part of an ongoing anti-drugs operation in the Caribbean, which saw the ship spend much of 2005–2008 in the region, confiscating over 13 tonnes (13 long tons; 14 short tons) of cocaine in total. On 8 November 2008 the ship was sent to the Cayman Islands to provide humanitarian relief assistance in the wake of Hurricane Paloma.

In June 2009, she took part in exercise Bersama Shield with HMS Ocean and HMS Somerset off the Malay Peninsula.

During February 2010, Wave Ruler and the destroyer HMS York were deployed to the Falkland Islands during a period of increased tension between the United Kingdom and Argentina over the former's plans to begin drilling for oil in the seas surrounding the islands. While in the South Atlantic, Wave Ruler took part in the rescue of an I-Kiribati sailor who was taken seriously ill, refuelling an RAF 1564 Search and Rescue Flight Sea King helicopter while in flight. The deployment also saw the ships visit Southern Thule in the Southern Sandwich Islands, the first British warships to visit the islands for nearly 10 years. November 2010 saw the vessel back in the Caribbean, where she distributed 160 t (160 long tons; 180 short tons) of fresh water and 32,000 water purification tablets in St Lucia after the effects of Hurricane Tomas. The deployment also saw the vessel visit Antigua and the British Overseas Territory of Grand Cayman.

=== 2011–2022 ===
Wave Ruler spent the summer and autumn of 2011 again in the Caribbean deployed as the United Kingdom's Atlantic Patrol Ship (North). She embarked a Mk 8 Lynx helicopter from 815 Naval Air Squadron for the duration.

In October 2012, Wave Ruler transited the Suez Canal and took over from RFA Fort Victoria as Gulf Readiness Tanker in the Persian Gulf. The Gulf Readiness Tanker operates in support of UKMCC Bahrain. In January 2013, Wave Ruler was relieved by RFA Fort Victoria.

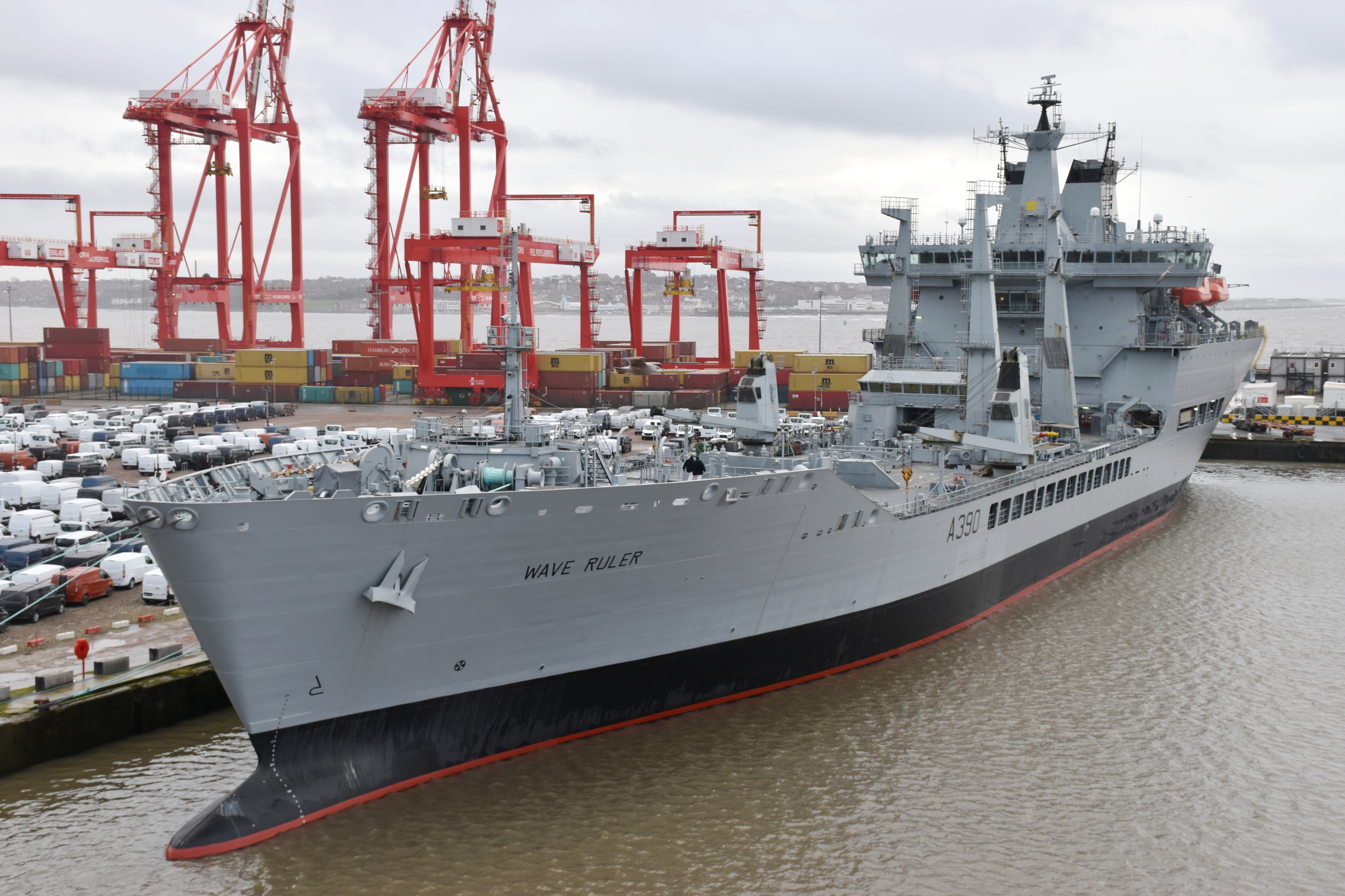
Wave Ruler in Liverpool (2019)

In late 2014, Wave Ruler deployed as part of the Cougar 14 Task Group, along with HM Ships Bulwark and HMS Northumberland, RFA Lyme Bay and the French frigate Courbet for naval exercises in the Mediterranean Sea and Persian Gulf. Wave Ruler remained east of Suez, operating with RFA Fort Austin until both ships were relieved by Fort Victoria in June 2015.

Wave Ruler spent the latter part of 2016 and early 2017 operating in Scottish waters and the English Channel in support of Flag Officer Sea Training (FOST). As of June 2020, Wave Ruler was reported to be in "reduced readiness" (reserve - base maintenance period) but maintained in good condition and available for reactivation. In February 2022, it was reported that Wave Ruler and her sister ship Wave Knight would be placed in "extended readiness" (uncrewed reserve).

== Future ==
In June 2018 it was reported by the Brazilian press that the UK MoD had offered to sell one or both of the Wave-class tankers to Brazil. As early as 2010, BAE Systems had proposed providing Brazil with a variant of the Wave class, tailored to meet the specific aviation, stores and personnel requirements of the Brazilian Navy. Nevertheless, the ship was still part of the RFA fleet (though maintained in reserve) as of late 2021, with the 2021 defence white paper apparently having had no overt impact on that status.

In November 2024, the newly elected Labour government indicated that both Wave Ruler and her sister ship, would, in fact, be removed from service by March 2025.

In February 2026, Inocea Group announced the purchase of both Wave-class ships (Wave Ruler and Wave Knight) with the intention of fitting them up for active service with allied nations.

== See also ==
- List of replenishment ships of the Royal Fleet Auxiliary
