= RFA Wave Knight (A389) =

2003 Wave-class fast fleet tanker of the Royal Fleet Auxiliary

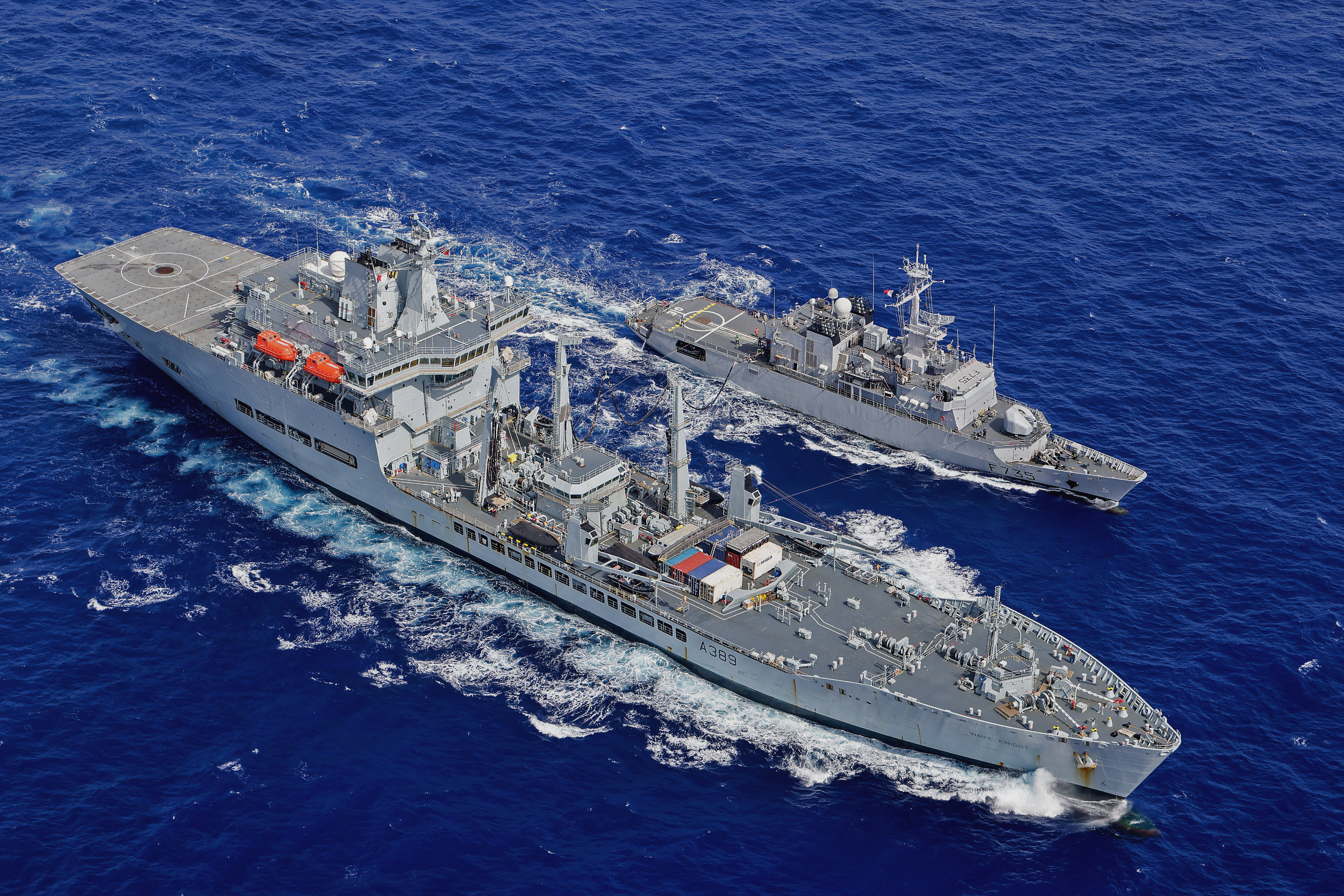
- Wave Knight resupplying the French frigate Germinal in the Caribbean Sea (August 2021)

History

United Kingdom
- Name: RFA Wave Knight
- Operator: Royal Fleet Auxiliary
- Ordered: 12 March 1997
- Builder: VSEL; BAE Systems Marine; Barrow-in-Furness
- Laid down: 22 October 1998
- Launched: 29 September 2000
- In service: 8 April 2003
- Out of service: March 2025
- Home port: HMNB Devonport
- Identification: IMO number: 9168594; MMSI number: 235491000; Callsign: GWBU; Pennant number: A389; Flight deck: WK
- Status: In extended readiness (uncrewed reserve)
- Badge

General characteristics
- Class & type: Wave-class tanker
- Displacement: 31,500 tonnes approx
- Length: 196.5 metres
- Beam: 28.25 metres
- Draft: 9.97 metres
- Propulsion: Diesel-electric: 4 × Wartsila 12V 32E/GECLM diesel generators 25,514 metric horsepower (18.76 MW); 2 × GEC Alstom motors with Cegelec variable speed converters 19,040 metric horsepower (14 MW); 1 × shaft; 18t thrust electric Kamewa bow thruster and 12t thrust electric stern thruster, both powered by Cegelec variable speed drives and motors
- Speed: 18 knots (33 km/h)
- Range: 10,000 nautical miles (20,000 km) at 15 knots (28 km/h)
- Capacity: 16,000 m^{3} of liquids (of which 3,000 m^{3} aviation fuel & 380 m^{3} fresh water); 125 tonnes of lubricating oil; 500 m^{3} of solids; 150 tonnes of fresh food in eight 20 ft refrigerated container units.
- Complement: 80 Royal Fleet Auxiliary personnel with provision for 22 Royal Navy personnel for helicopter and weapons systems operations
- Sensors & processing systems: Surface search: E/F band; Navigation: KH 1077, I-band; IFF: Type 1017
- Electronic warfare & decoys: Sea Gnat decoy launcher system
- Armament: 2 × DS30B 30 mm cannon; 2 × 7.62 mm Mk.44 Miniguns (retired 2023); 5 × 7.62 mm L7 Machine Guns; 2 × Vulcan Phalanx CIWS (all weapons removed given uncrewed reserve status)
- Aircraft carried: 1 Merlin helicopter with full hangar facilities

RFA Wave Knight is a Wave-class fast fleet tanker of the Royal Fleet Auxiliary (RFA) of the United Kingdom tasked with providing fuel, food, fresh water, ammunition and other supplies to Royal Navy vessels around the world.

Wave Knight was built by VSEL (after 1999, BAE Systems Marine) in Barrow-in-Furness, being launched in 2000. She was accepted into service in 2003 and is the second ship to bear this name in RFA service. Wave Knight and her sister Wave Ruler replaced the elderly Olna and Olwen, two Ol-class 36,000 ton fast fleet tankers built at Swan Hunter and Hawthorn Leslie respectively in the 1960s.

== Design ==
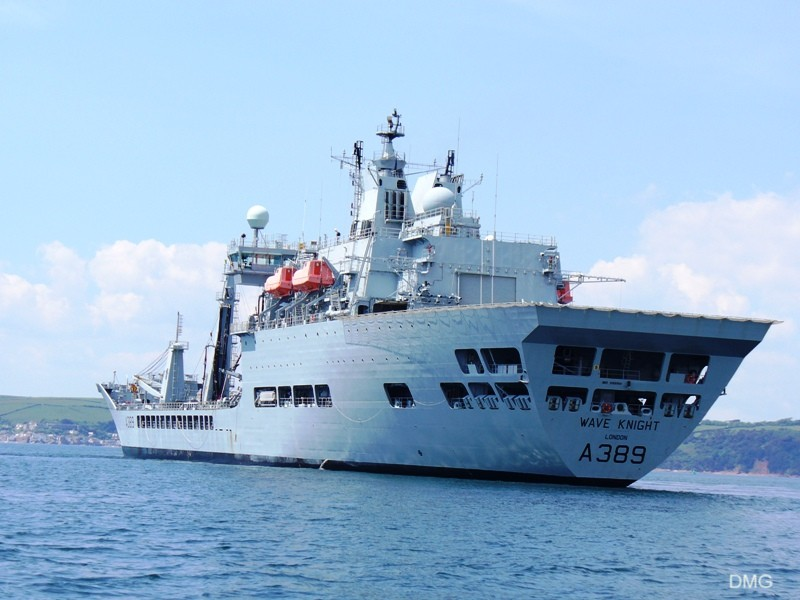
A stern view of RFA Wave Knight at anchor in Plymouth, 2006

Wave Knight has a standard crew of 80 Royal Fleet Auxiliary personnel with provision for a further 22 Royal Navy personnel to conduct helicopter and weapons systems operations. She carries a full medical team and sick bay and is capable of distributing 2,000 emergency relief packages in times of crisis.

The ship has the capability to supply fuel and other liquid cargo to vessels using replenishment rigs on port and starboard beams and through a Hudson reel-type stern rig. When providing support for amphibious operations, Wave Ruler is also able to deliver fuel to dracones positioned alongside. In addition to fuel, the ship carries ammunition and other stores which can be transferred while underway. She can operate a Merlin HM1 helicopter, or other helicopters of similar size, from a hangar and flight deck at the stern.

== Operational history ==
=== 2003–2010 ===
In October 2004, Wave Knight and the frigate HMS Montrose provided assistance to the stricken Canadian submarine HMCS Chicoutimi, which ran into difficulties 100 miles (160 km) north-west of County Mayo, Ireland after 2,000 litres of seawater entered the vessel due to hatches being left open in the fin. Three of the Chicoutimi's crew were airlifted to hospital in Ireland, one dying en route.

During 2008 and 2009, Wave Knight was deployed to the Middle East, where she acted as Arabian Gulf Ready Tanker in support of Allied forces, providing fuel and supplies to ships from over eight nations

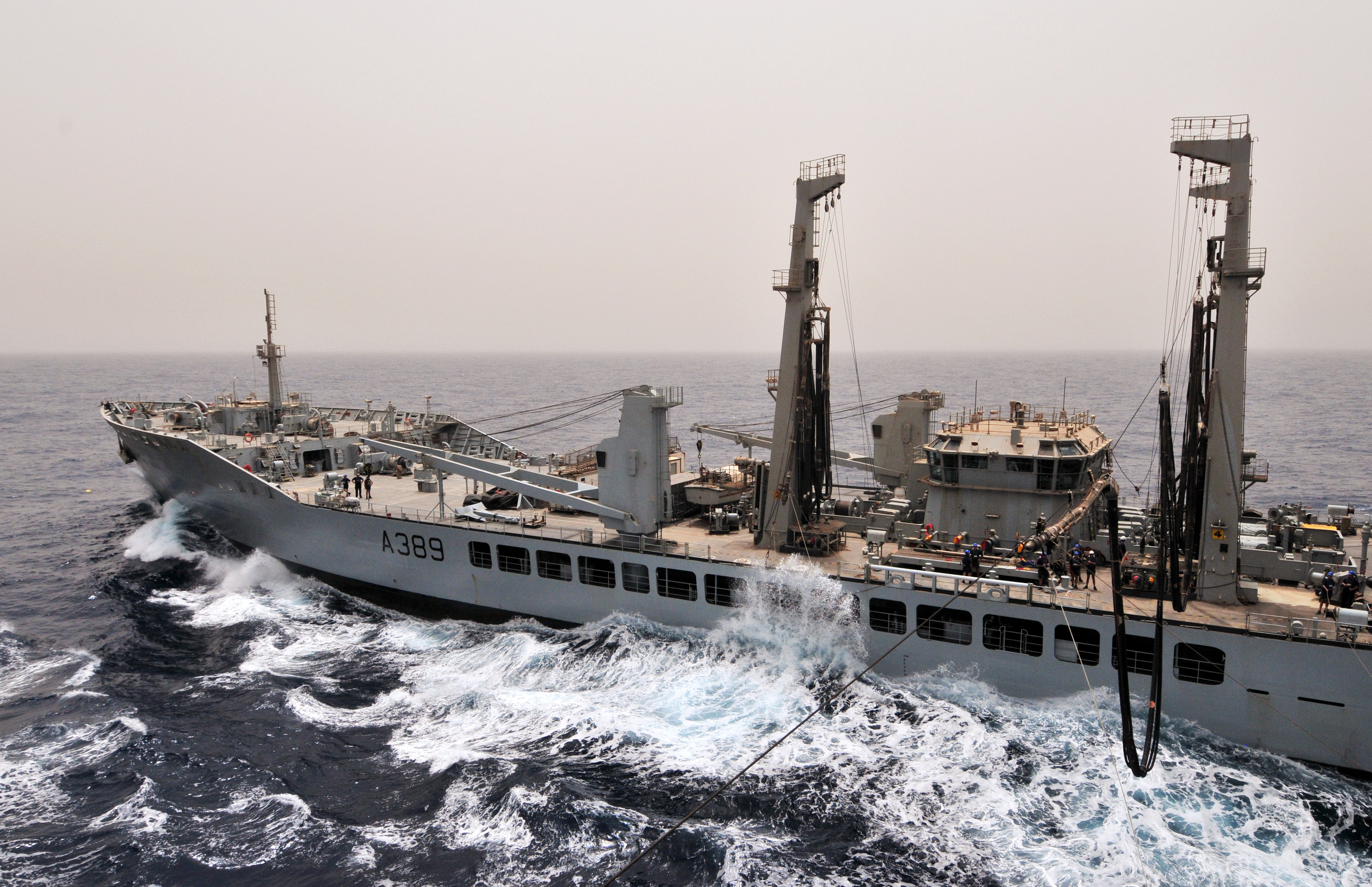
Wave Knight prepares to transfer fuel to the amphibious assault ship USS Bataan during a replenishment at sea.

Between 17 and 21 May 2008, the Wave Knight participated in Exercise KhunjarHaad, a multi-national exercise held in the Gulf of Oman. Other participating warships included the American destroyer USS Russell, the French frigate Surcouf, the British frigate Montrose, and four other coalition ships conducted air defence; surface warfare operation; visit, board, search and seizure; and joint gunnery exercises, which focused on joint interoperability training and proficiency.

On 18 April 2009, Royal Navy personnel operating from Wave Knight in the Gulf of Aden managed to intercept and fend off two pirate attacks involving the vessels Handy Tankers Magic and Front Ardennes using the ship's armament. At 0800, the ship received a distress call from MV Handy Tankers Magic indicating that they were under attack by pirates and requesting assistance. Arriving on the scene, Wave Knight gave chase to the pirate skiff and using its weapons as cover, held it and its 'mother boat' until the Dutch naval vessel HNLMS De Zeven Provincien arrived. 13 hostages were released and the pirates' weapons were destroyed. Within two hours, another distress call was received by Wave Knight from the vessel MV Front Ardennes, also under attack by pirates. Arriving to give support, the ship prevented the pirates from boarding the tanker, firing warning shots and causing the pirates to flee. With helicopters from the NATO task group ships HMCS Winnipeg and USS Halyburton, Wave Knight gave chase for six hours, until HMCS Winnipeg arrived, disarming the pirates.

The then commanding officer of Wave Knight, Captain Pilling, said:

RFA Wave Knight is a modern replenishment ship designed to be able to support a myriad of coalition maritime operations. Our primary role is refuelling and aviation operations, but we are fully capable of conducting anti-piracy operations in and around the Horn of Africa. We have been on station for over a year providing support to many nations, and we remain committed to helping ensure maritime security.

— Captain Pilling, Royal Navy interview

On 23 October 2009 personnel aboard Wave Knight witnessed the kidnapping by Somali pirates of two British citizens, Paul and Rachel Chandler, from the yacht Lynn Rival. Despite coming to within 15 m of the couple's vessel, they did not intervene for fear of endangering their lives. When giving a speech at Chatham House on 27 November 2009, First Sea Lord Admiral Sir Mark Stanhope made his position on the crew's conduct clear, stating that "They do not appreciate, and I do not like them, being branded cowards".

In 2009–2010, the ship underwent a re-fit in Liverpool. As of February 2011, she was back in service.

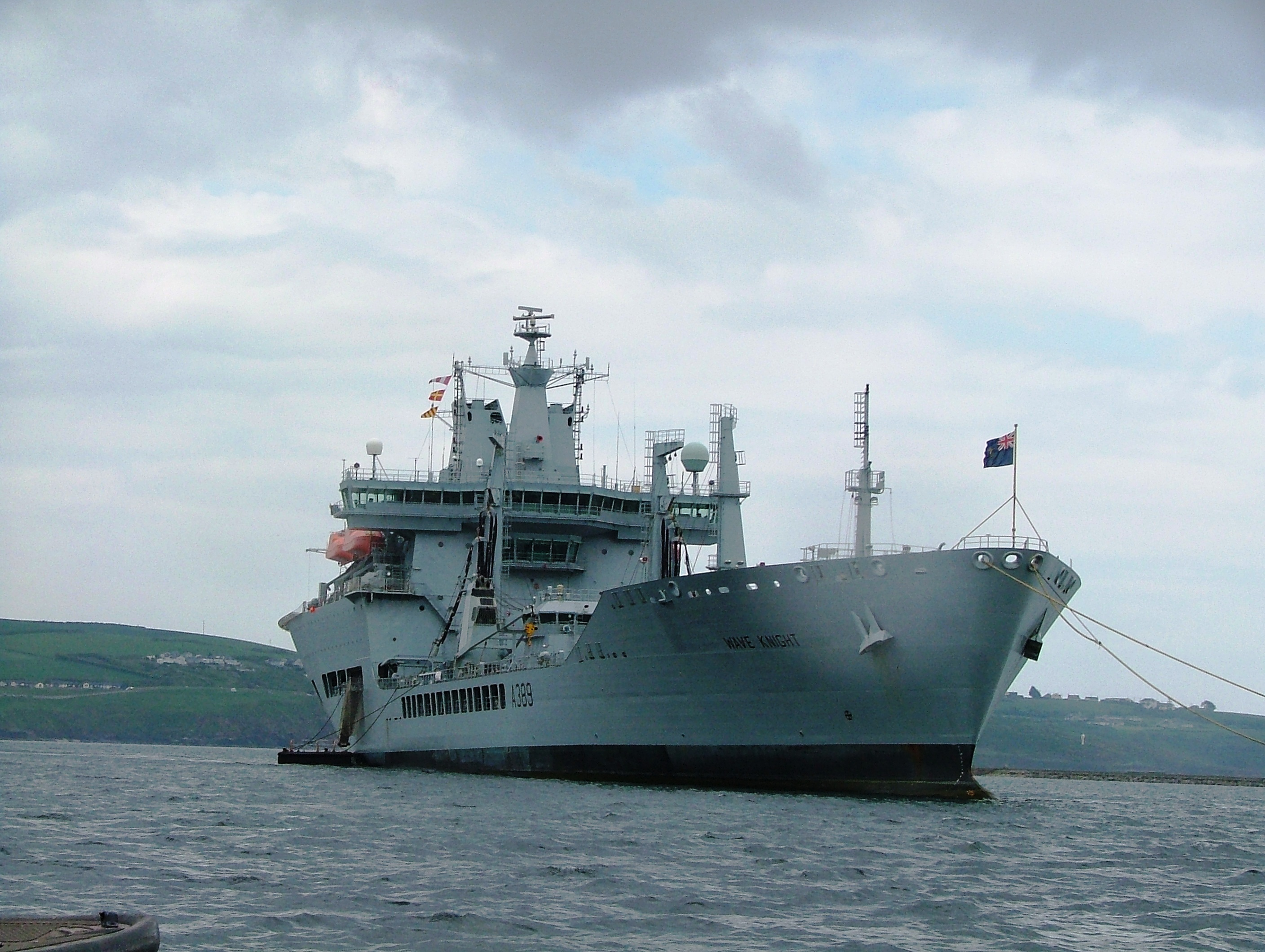
Wave Knight at anchor in Plymouth Sound, 2008

=== 2011–2022 ===
On 25 April 2011, Wave Knight left Portland and joined the COUGAR 11 deployment, the first of the Response Force Task Group deployments, where she is acting as a supply/support ship. The deployment also saw her take part in Exercise Cypriot Lion, off the coast of Cyprus.

3 June 2011 saw Wave Knight and the vessels HMS Albion, HMS Sutherland and RFA Fort Rosalie, ordered to break away from the COUGAR 11 deployment and head to the coast of Libya to take part in Operation Unified Protector, the ongoing NATO operation there. By late June the vessels were back on the RFTG tasking, and after passing through the Suez Canal began Operation Red Alligator, a major exercise in the Red Sea with the Armed Forces of Saudi Arabia.

February 2012 saw Wave Knight operating in the Red Sea and the Gulf of Aden as part of Operation Scimitar Anzac, an anti-piracy operation in the Red Sea and the Gulf of Aden. This international operation included the Royal Navy destroyer Daring, the Royal Australian Navy frigate Parramatta, and the Pakistan Navy's Babur. Wave Knight acted as the replenishment vessel for the ships. She returned to the UK on 16 March 2012 to prepare for a refit period after ten years of operations. During the refit upgrades were made to the ships engine, cabins, and air conditioning systems.

In January 2013, Wave Knight departed Portland for a six-month deployment to the Caribbean, where she will act as Atlantic Patrol (North), relieving RFA Argus. She conducted anti-narcotic operations and was on standby to provide humanitarian aid for the 2013 hurricane season On 1 May 2013, Wave Knight was berthed in Miami's Port Government Cut. On 17 June she called into the port of Willemstad, Curaçao at the Otrabanda Megapier.

Wave Knight deployed as part of the COUGAR 14 Response Force Task Group.

In July 2016, Wave Knight relieved HMS Mersey in the Caribbean to begin another stint on Atlantic Patrol Task (North). In February 2017, Wave Knight berthed in Havana, Cuba, for a formal visit while in May she arrived in Bermuda for the 35th America's Cup sailing regatta; the first such regatta held in British waters since the 1860s and the first on the eastern seaboard since 1983.

Wave Knight returned to Portland on 13 July 2017 having been relieved in the Caribbean by RFA Mounts Bay.

In June 2019 she supported ships of the Joint Expeditionary Force for exercise Baltic Protector in the eastern Baltic before heading for Norway for exercise Dynamic Mongoose in July. In August 2019 she deployed to the Persian Gulf for a long-planned deployment to Operation Kipion in the role of KIPION Ready Tanker.

In August 2021, whilst in the Caribbean, Wave Knight, was sent to assist the international aid effort in Haiti following the 2021 Haiti earthquake and Tropical Storm Grace.

In February 2022, it was reported that the ship would be placed in "extended readiness" (uncrewed reserve).

== Future ==
In June 2018 it was reported by the Brazilian press that the UK MoD had offered to sell one or both of the Wave-class tankers to Brazil. As early as 2010, BAE Systems had proposed providing Brazil with a variant of the Wave-class, tailored to meet the specific aviation, stores and personnel requirements of the Brazilian Navy.

In June 2023, it was reported by one source that due to manning shortages in the RFA the ship, along with her sister ship Wave Ruler, would be decommissioned and potentially sold abroad. However, in the same month James Cartlidge, the Minister of State, Ministry of Defence, stated that both ships were to be retained in extended readiness until 2028 with the option of potentially reactivating them if required. In November 2024, the newly elected Labour government indicated that both ships would, in fact, be removed from service by March 2025.

In October 2024, Wave Knight was used to film several scenes for the movie Project Hail Mary, released in 2026.

In February 2026, Inocea Group announced the purchase of both Wave-class ships (Wave Knight and Wave Ruler) with the intention of fitting them up for active service with allied nations.

== Affiliations ==
Wave Knight is affiliated with the following military and civilian organisations, bodies & individuals:

- Lady Catherine Guthrie (sponsor).
- No. 216 Squadron RAF
- Middlesbrough Council
- Sea Cadet unit TS Fairmaid
- The Worshipful Company of Fuellers

== See also ==
- List of replenishment ships of the Royal Fleet Auxiliary
