= Wave-class tanker =

Class of two fast fleet tankers of the Royal Fleet Auxiliary

Wave class
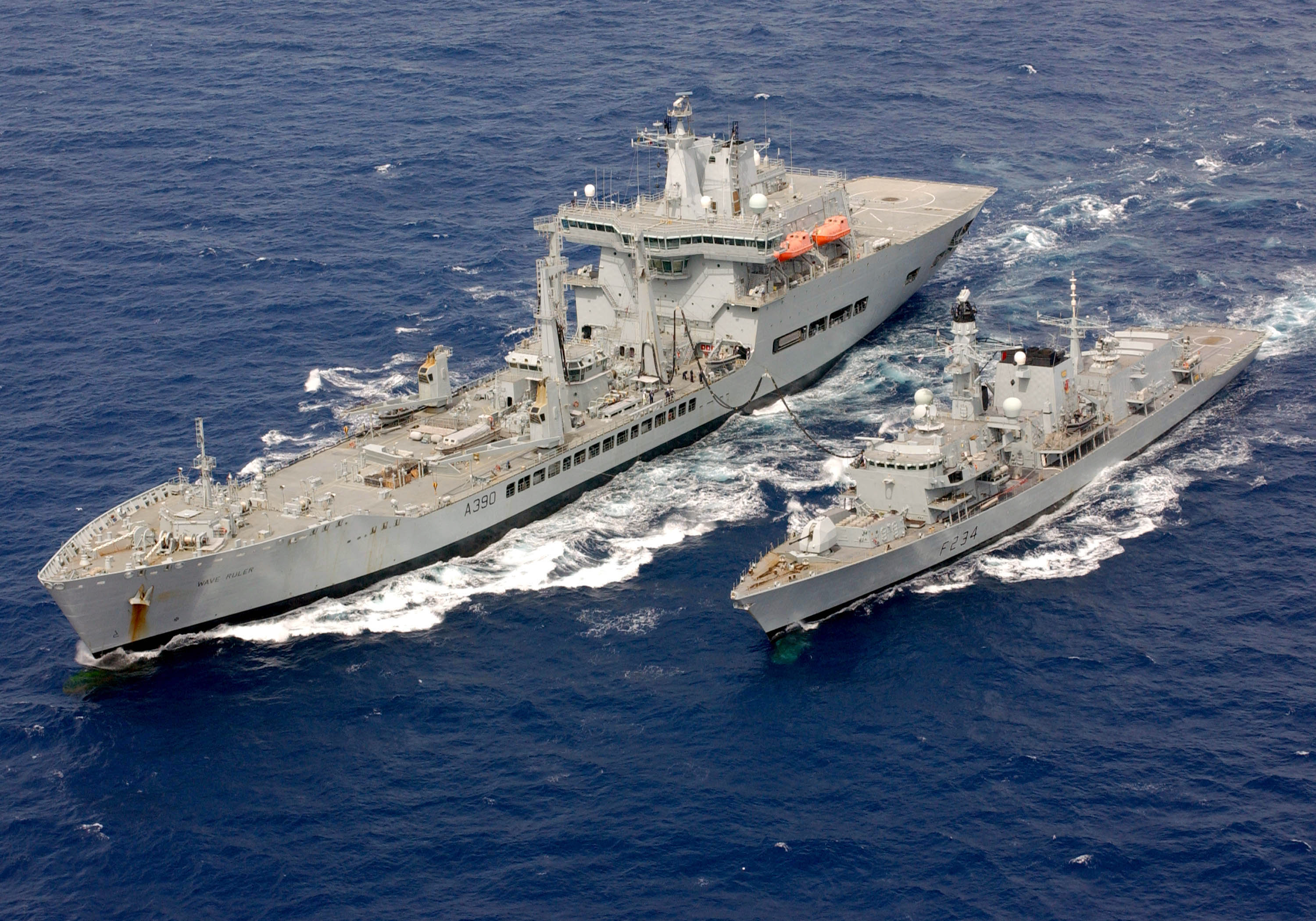
- RFA Wave Ruler (left) carrying out a replenishment at sea with the frigate HMS Iron Duke in 2006

Class overview
- Name: Wave class
- Builders: VSEL (later BAE Systems Marine)
- Operators: Royal Fleet Auxiliary
- Preceded by: Ol class
- Succeeded by: Tide class
- In service: 8 April 2003–March 2025
- Completed: 2
- Retired: 2

General characteristics
- Type: Fast fleet tanker
- Displacement: 31,500 tonnes approx
- Length: 196.5 m (644 ft 8 in)
- Beam: 28.25 m (92 ft 8 in)
- Draft: 9.97 m (32 ft 9 in)
- Propulsion: Diesel-electric: 4 × Wartsila 12V 32E/GECLM diesel generators 25,514 metric horsepower (18.76 MW); 2 × GEC Alstom motors with Cegelec variable speed converters 19,040 metric horsepower (14 MW); 1 × shaft; 18t thrust electric Kamewa bow thruster and 12t thrust electric stern thruster, both powered by Cegelec variable speed drives and motors
- Speed: 20 knots (37 km/h)
- Range: 10,000 nautical miles (20,000 km) at 15 knots (28 km/h)
- Capacity: 16,000 m^{3} of liquids (of which 3,000 m^{3} aviation fuel & 380 m^{3} fresh water); 125 tonnes of lubricating oil; 500 m^{3} of solids; 150 tonnes of fresh food in eight 20 ft refrigerated container units.
- Complement: 80 Royal Fleet Auxiliary personnel with provision for 22 Royal Navy personnel for helicopter and weapons systems operations
- Sensors & processing systems: Surface search: E/F band; Navigation: Kelvin Hughes Ltd SharpEye navigation radar; IFF: Type 1017
- Electronic warfare & decoys: Sea Gnat decoy launcher system
- Armament: 2 × DS30B 30 mm guns; 2 × 7.62 mm Mk.44 miniguns (retired 2023); 5 × 7.62 mm L7 machine guns; 2 × Vulcan Phalanx CIWS (all weapons removed given uncrewed reserve status)
- Aircraft carried: 1 × Merlin helicopter with full hangar facilities

The Wave-class tankers are a class of two fast fleet tankers which were in service with the Royal Fleet Auxiliary (RFA) the naval auxiliary fleet of the United Kingdom. The class was tasked with providing fuel, food, fresh water, ammunition and other supplies to Royal Navy vessels around the world. The two ships in the class are: RFA Wave Knight and RFA Wave Ruler. These were ordered to replace the aging Ol-class tankers RFA Olna and RFA Olwen.

The two vessels have seen service in a number of locations, including anti-drug and hurricane relief operations in the Caribbean Sea, anti-piracy activities around the Horn of Africa, and deterrent patrols in the South Atlantic. As of early 2022, both ships were earmarked for "extended readiness" status (i.e. uncrewed reserve). In November 2024, the newly elected Labour government indicated that both ships would be removed from service by March 2025.

In February 2026 Inocea Group (a commercial company) announced the purchase of both Wave-class ships.

== History ==
A contract was placed for the vessels in 1997 with Vickers Shipbuilding and Engineering Ltd (Marconi Marine VSEL). Construction of Wave Knight began in 1998 at VSEL's Barrow-in-Furness yard and the ship was launched in 2000. With the acquisition of Marconi Electronic Systems and its Marconi Marine subsidiary in 1999 British Aerospace became BAE Systems. BAE now owns VSEL in Barrow and the Yarrow and Govan shipyards on the Clyde. BAE transferred the construction of Wave Ruler to Govan in 2000 and the vessel was launched in 2001. Both vessels were commissioned in 2003.

== Design ==
The ships have the capability to supply fuel and other liquid cargo to vessels using replenishment rigs on port and starboard beams and through a Hudson reel-type stern rig. When providing support for amphibious operations, the ships are also able to deliver fuel to dracones positioned alongside. The equipment load includes cranes (for stores handling and abeam replenishment), steering and rudder gear, thyristor-controlled winch/windlasses and double drum mooring winches. Up to 16,000 m^{3} (570,000 cu ft) of liquids and 500 m^{3} (18,000 cu ft) of general solids can be carried. In addition, reverse-osmosis equipment is fitted enabling the production of 100 m^{3} (3,500 cu ft) of drinkable water per day.

The vessels were designed with double hulls to prevent or reduce environmental pollution from oil spills if damage is sustained to the outer hull.

The ships can operate a Merlin HM1 helicopter, or other helicopters of similar size, from a hangar and flight deck at the stern. On deployments to Atlantic Patrol Task (N) they have typically embarked a Royal Navy Lynx or a United States Coast Guard helicopter.

The vessels have a standard crew of 80 Royal Fleet Auxiliary personnel with provision for a further 22 Royal Navy personnel to conduct helicopter and weapons systems operations. They carry a full medical team and sick bay and are capable of distributing 2,000 emergency relief packages in times of crisis.

== Construction programme ==
The vessels were constructed in twelve modular segments that were subsequently assembled. For RFA Wave Knight, the cargo tankage was fabricated at Harland and Wolff in Belfast, while the 1,000-tonne stern block was produced at Cammell Laird in Newcastle and shipped by sea to Barrow. The funnel was sourced from Appledore Shipbuilders in North Devon. In contrast, RFA Wave Ruler was predominantly built at Govan, although some of the steel components originated from Barrow.

Name	Pennant	Builder	Ordered	Laid down	Launched	In service
Wave Knight	A389	VSEL (later BAE Systems), Barrow-in-Furness	12 March 1997	22 October 1998	29 September 2000	8 April 2003
Wave Ruler	A390	BAE Systems, Govan	12 March 1997	10 February 2000	9 February 2001	27 April 2003

== Decommissioning and fate ==
In June 2018 it was reported by the Brazilian press that the United Kingdom's Ministry of Defence (MoD) had offered to sell one or both of the Wave-class tankers to Brazil. As early as 2010, BAE Systems had proposed providing Brazil with a variant of the Wave-class, tailored to meet the specific aviation, stores and personnel requirements of the Brazilian Navy.

In June 2020, RFA Wave Ruler was reported to be in extended readiness (uncrewed reserve) but maintained in good condition and available for re-activation. In February 2022, it was reported that both tankers of the class would be kept in "extended readiness". In June 2023, one report suggested that due to manning shortages in the RFA, both ships would be decommissioned and potentially sold abroad. However, in the same month James Cartlidge, the then Minister of State for Defence Procurement, stated that both ships were to be retained in extended readiness until 2028 with the option of potentially reactivating them if required.

On 20 November 2024, the Secretary of State for Defence John Healey announced that both Wave-class oilers were to be decommissioned by March 2025, three years earlier than initially planned, in order to reduce expenses.

On 18 February 2026, Inocea Group announced the purchase of both Wave-class ships, with the intention of fitting them up for active service with allied nations.

== Gallery ==
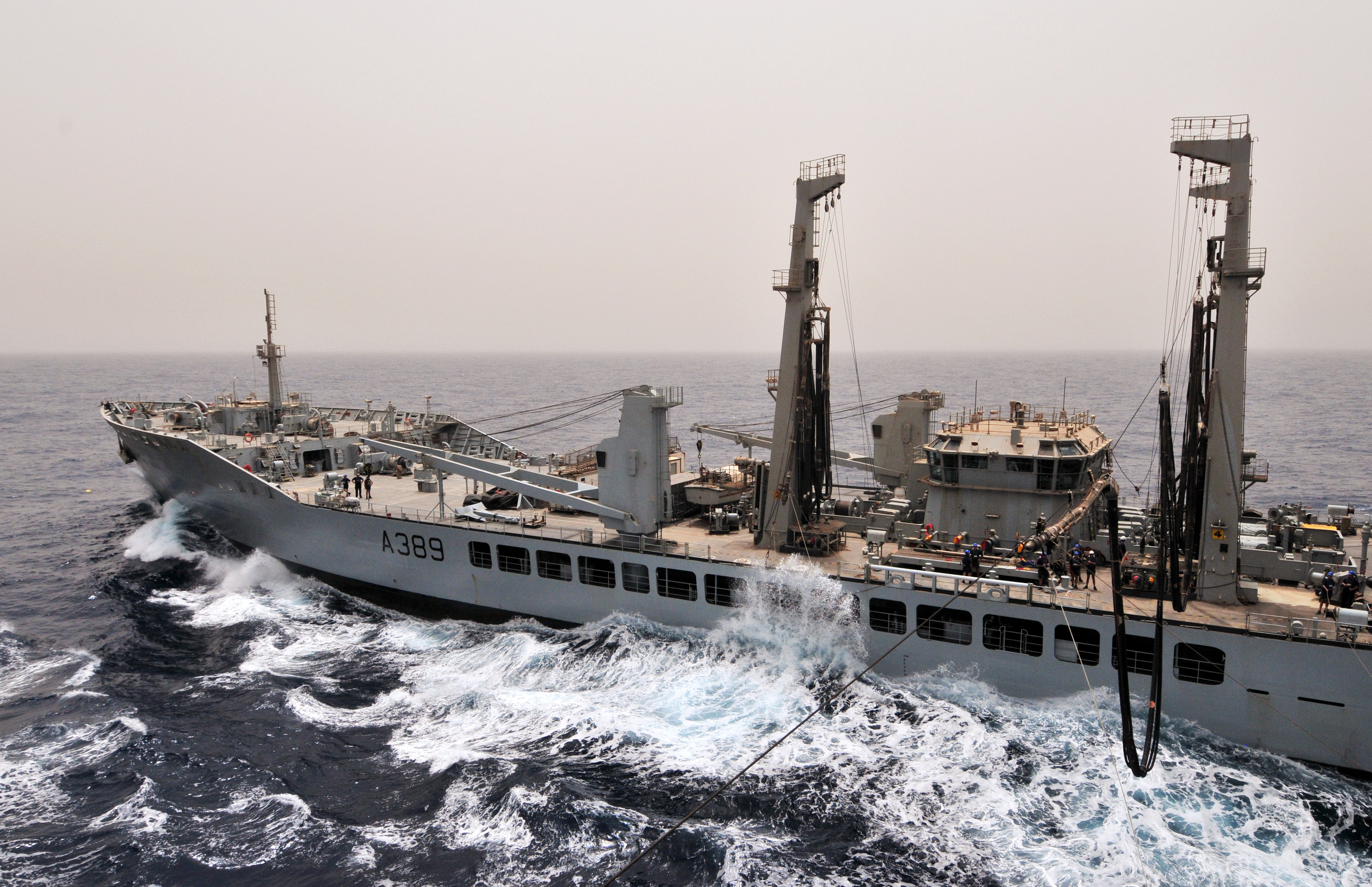
Wave Knight prepares to transfer fuel to the amphibious assault ship USS Bataan during a replenishment at sea.

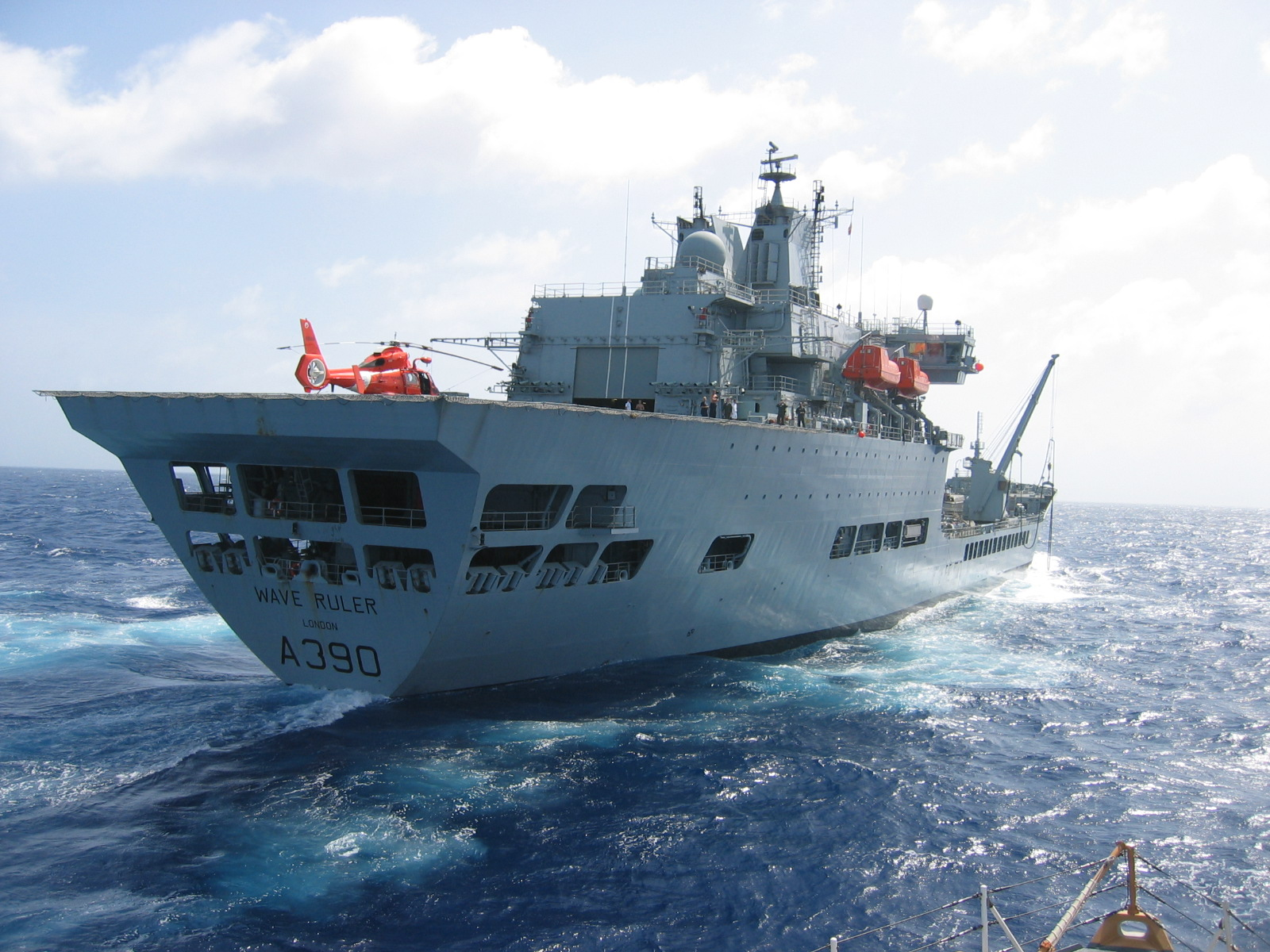
Wave Ruler underway with a United States Coast Guard Eurocopter HH-65 Dolphin helicopter embarked

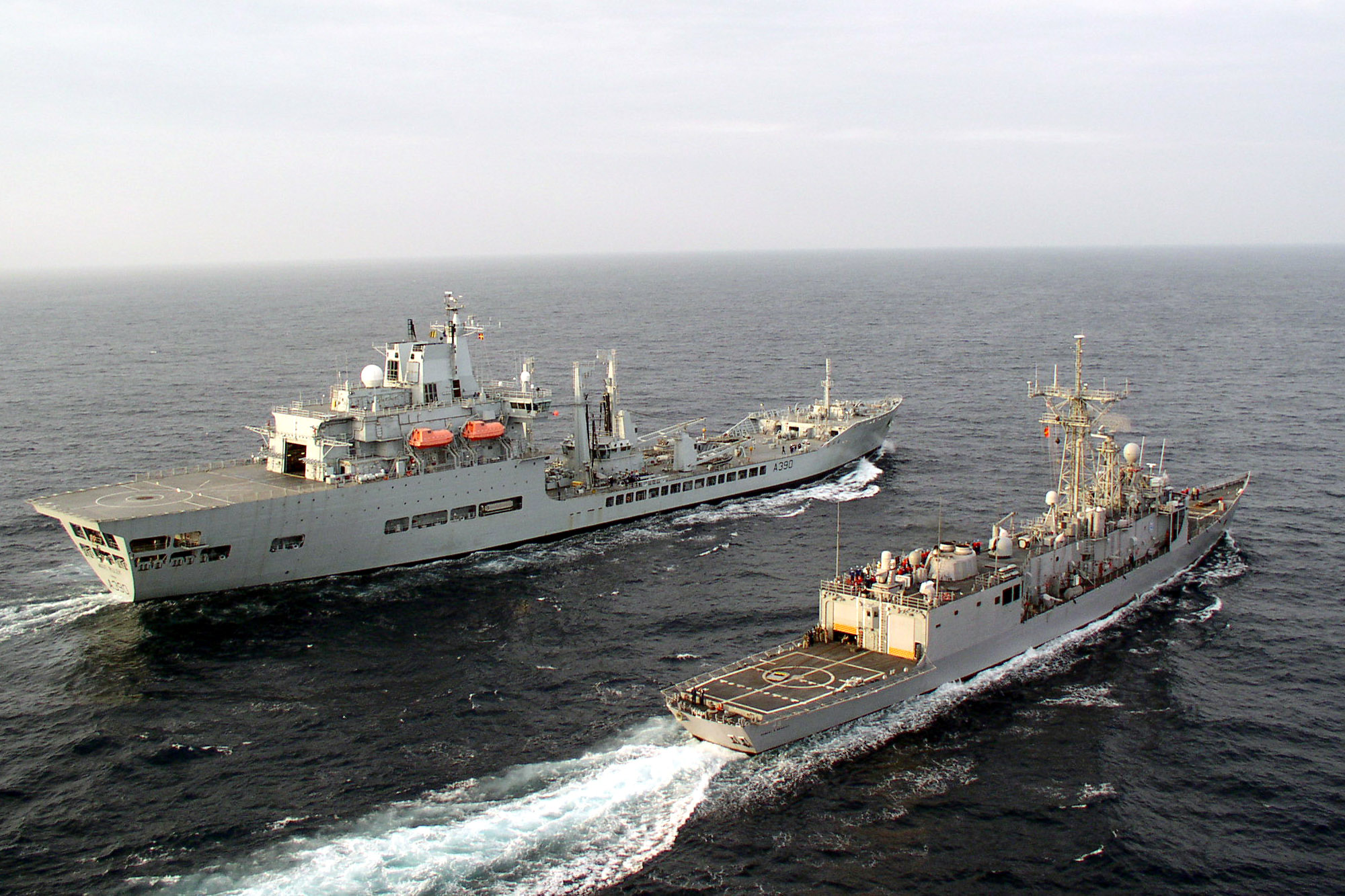
Wave Ruler (background) refuels USS Robert G. Bradley in the Pacific Ocean.

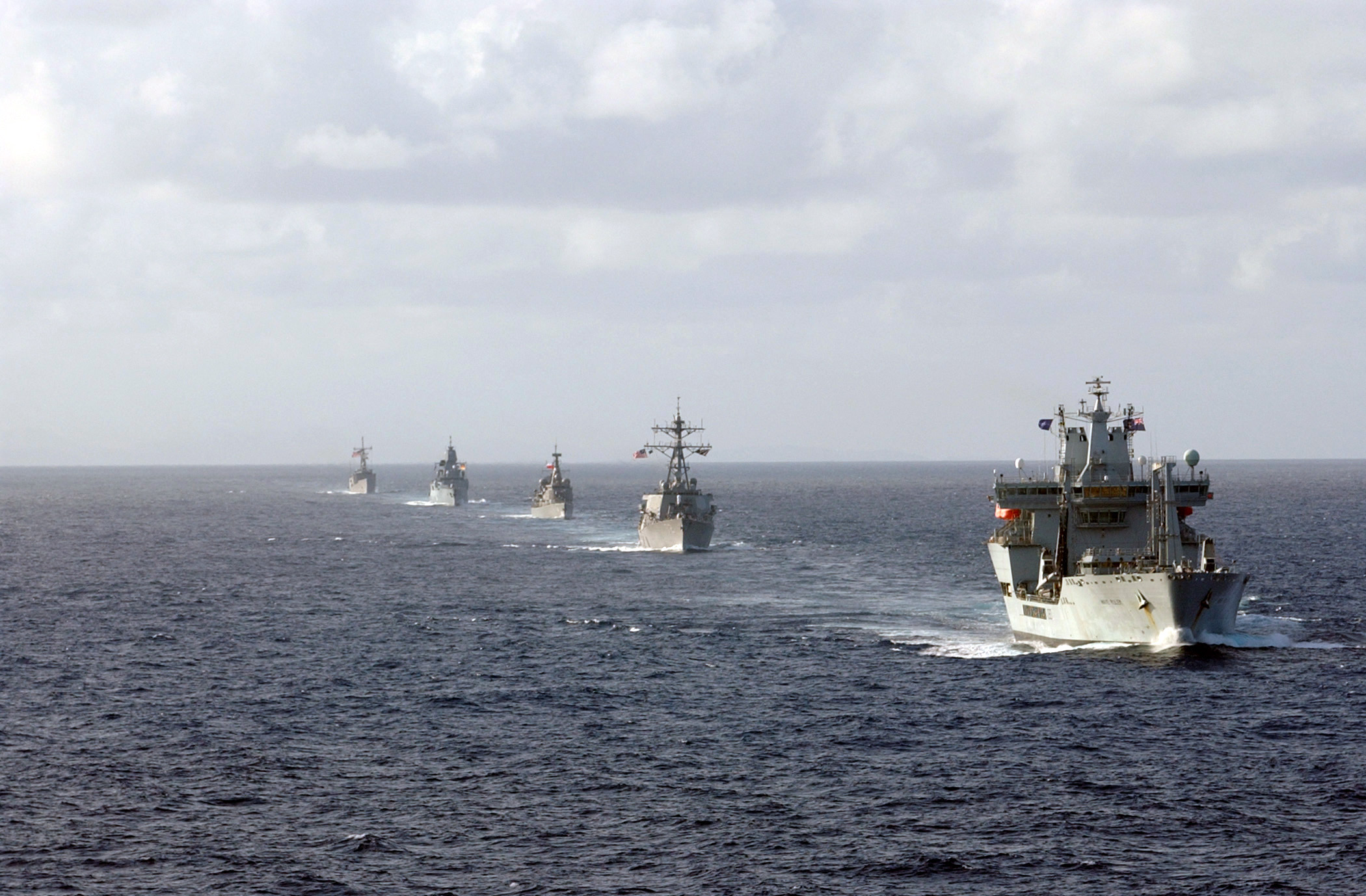
Wave Ruler (foreground), USS Mahan, Almirante Latorre, Sachsen, and USS Samuel B. Roberts navigate in formation.

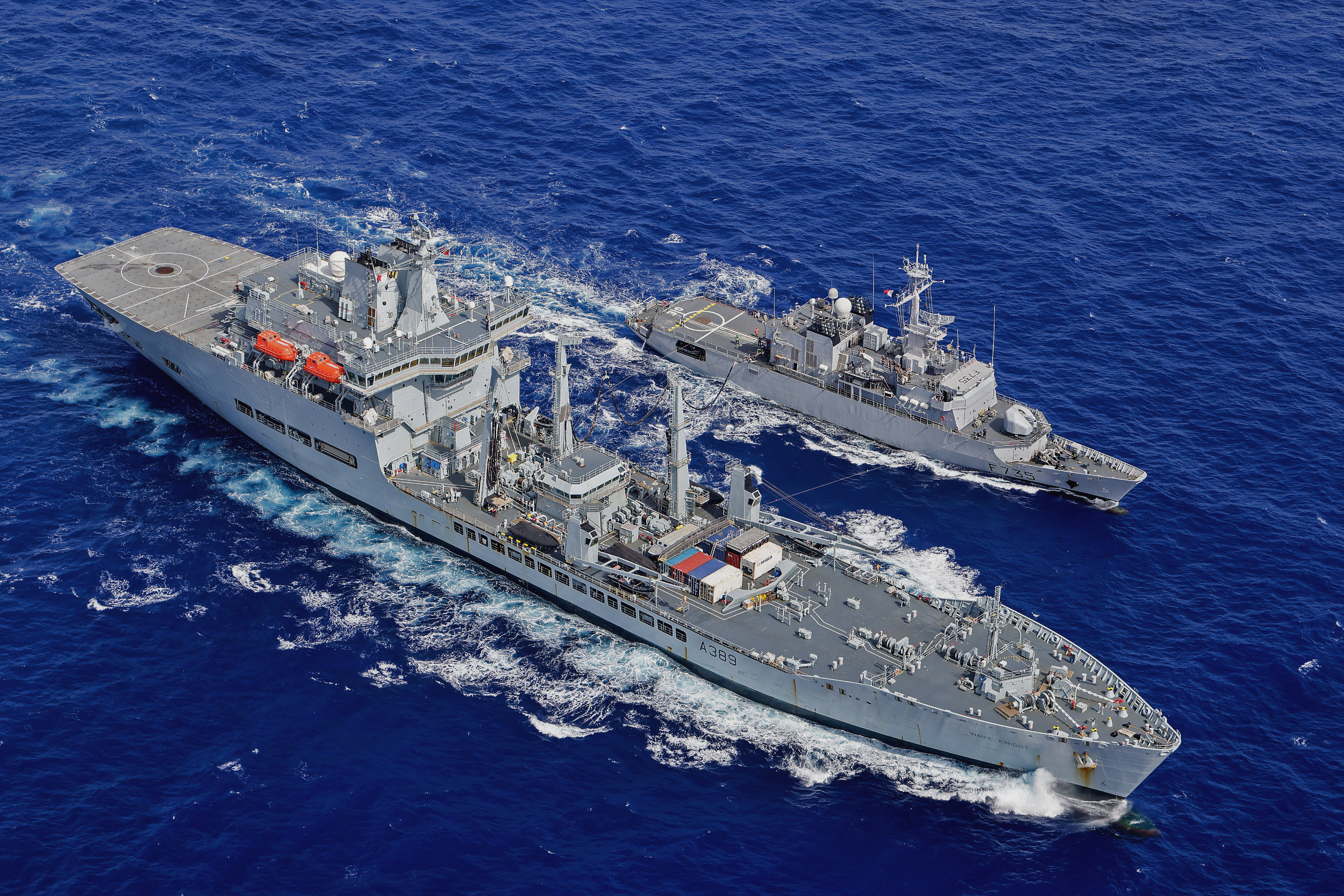
Wave Knight resupplying French frigate Germinal.

== See also ==
- List of replenishment ships of the Royal Fleet Auxiliary
- Wave-class oiler - 1940s class some of whose names were reused by the 2003 ships
