= A389 =

A389 may refer to:

- A389 road (Great Britain)
- RFA Wave Knight (A389), a British fleet auxiliary vessel
- Airbus A380-900, a model of aircraft
