= RFA Olna =

Three ships of the Royal Fleet Auxiliary have borne the name RFA Olna:

- RFA Olna (X47) was an oiler launched in 1921 and beached at Crete in 1941 after being bombed.
- RFA Olna (A216) was an oiler launched in 1944 and scrapped in 1967.
- RFA Olna (A123) was a fast fleet tanker launched in 1965 and sold in 2001.
