= RFA Olmeda =

1965 Ol-class fast fleet tanker of the Royal Fleet Auxiliary

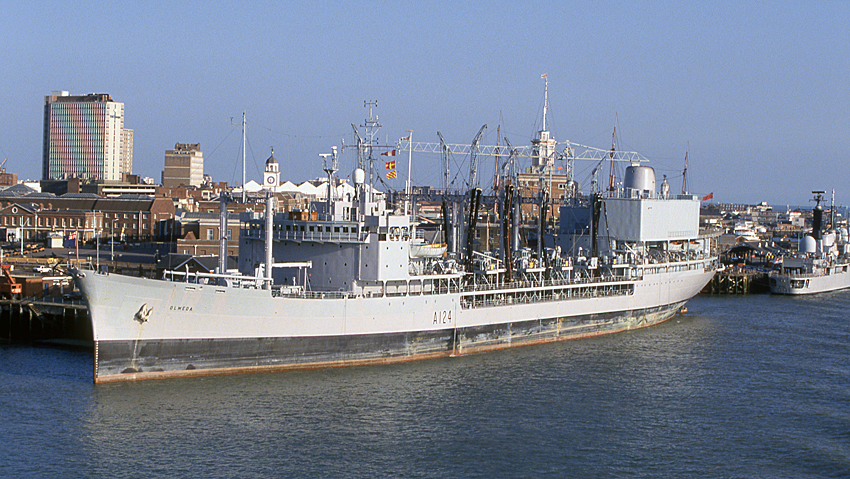
- RFA Olmeda in Portsmouth

History

United Kingdom
- Name: RFA Olmeda
- Builder: Swan Hunter & Wigham Richardson, Wallsend, Tyne and Wear
- Yard number: 2004
- Laid down: 27 August 1963
- Launched: 10 July 1964 as Oleander
- In service: 19 October 1965
- Out of service: January 1994
- Renamed: Olmeda, 4 December 1967; Niaxco, 5 July 1994
- Identification: IMO number: 6501331; Callsign: GPBE; Pennant number: A124; Flight deck: OD
- Honours and awards: Falklands War 1982
- Fate: Arrived Alang for demolition, 17 August 1994
- Badge

General characteristics
- Class & type: Ol-class tanker
- Displacement: 33,240 long tons (33,773 t) full load
- Length: 648 ft (198 m)
- Beam: 84 ft 2 in (25.65 m)
- Draught: 24 ft (290 in)
- Propulsion: 2× Pametrada steam turbines, double reduction geared, single shaft
- Speed: 21 knots (24 mph; 39 km/h)
- Range: 10,000 nmi (19,000 km) at 16 kn (18 mph; 30 km/h)
- Complement: 88 RFA; 40 RN
- Armament: 2× 20 mm guns; 2× Chaff launchers
- Aircraft carried: 3× Wessex or Sea King helicopters
- Aviation facilities: Helicopter deck, hangar

Service record
- Operations: Operation Corporate; Operation Keyhole; Operation Granby

RFA Olmeda (A124) was an Ol-class "fast fleet tanker" of the Royal Fleet Auxiliary (RFA) the naval auxiliary fleet of the United Kingdom. She was designed by the builders to meet specific requirements and be capable of maintaining “fleet speed” (defined as sustained steaming at 20 knots). When she entered service she was one of the largest and fastest ships in the RFA Fleet. Initially named Oleander, she was renamed after two years in operation.

The second of her class, Olmeda came into service in late 1965 as Oleander. As with her sister ships, Olmeda's early service was routine. However, in 1967, the ship had to be renamed from Oleander to Olmeda to avoid confusion with HMS Leander.

In the last action of the Falklands War, Olmeda helped recapture the South Sandwich Islands.

== Design and description ==
Olmeda had a normal complement consisting of 88 Royal Fleet Auxiliary personnel with provision for 40 Royal Navy personnel and she was armed with two 20 mm guns and two Corvus chaff launchers. She was designed to achieve a speed of 21 knots (39 km/h; 24 mph) with a fully loaded displacement of 36,000 tonnes (35,000 long tons; 40,000 short tons).

The ship had the capability to supply fuel and other liquid cargo to vessels using four pairs of replenishment rigs which were located between the forward and aft superstructures. She was able to carry four types of fuels: Furnace Fuel Oil, Diesel, Avcat and Mogas. Limited supplies of lubricating oils, fresh water and dry stores could also be carried. She could operate Westland Wessex or Westland Sea King helicopters, or other helicopters of similar size, from a hangar and flight deck at the stern.

== Operational history ==
=== 1973 ===
During the Second Cod War, Olmeda supported Royal Navy ships twice, initially for just under three weeks, from 22 September until 10 October and then a further two weeks from 14 until 27 October.

=== 1975 ===
From 6 February 1975, she was deployed to Cyprus, due to the Turkish invasion, to support HMS Tiger and HMS Charybdis, in support of UN Peace Keeping Force and British interests.

=== 1982 ===
==== Falklands War ====
On 5 April she sailed from HMNB Devonport for service during Operation Corporate, the Falklands Conflict, with a Fleet Air Arm Westland Sea King HAS.2 utility helicopter, reg. XV649, embarked, of 824 Naval Air Squadron 'A' Flight.

Olmeda saw extensive service during the Falklands War, being one of the first ships to head south. Olmeda refuelled numerous ships of the Task Force including HMS Hermes, HMS Invincible, and the SS Uganda.

After the Argentine surrender of the Falkland Islands, Olmeda, HMS Yarmouth, HMS Endurance and the tug Salvageman sailed to the South Sandwich Islands where Argentina had established a base in South Thule since 1976. Following a demonstration of Yarmouth's guns, the ten Argentine military personnel surrendered. Before leaving South Thule, Yarmouth was refueled by Olmeda on 21 June, which may have been the most southerly underway replenishment in the history of the Royal Navy.

=== 1994 ===
==== Gulf War ====
In January 1994, she was deployed to the Persian Gulf in support of naval units involved in Operation Granby.

== Decommissioning ==
In July 1994 Olmeda was sold for £1.2m to Singaporean owners and renamed Niaxco. She then sailed under her own power from Portsmouth to Alang Ship Breaking Yard in India, arriving in August. Breaking up commenced on 23 December.

== See also ==
- List of replenishment ships of the Royal Fleet Auxiliary
