= Ol-class tanker (1965) =

Class of three fast fleet tankers of the Royal Fleet Auxiliary

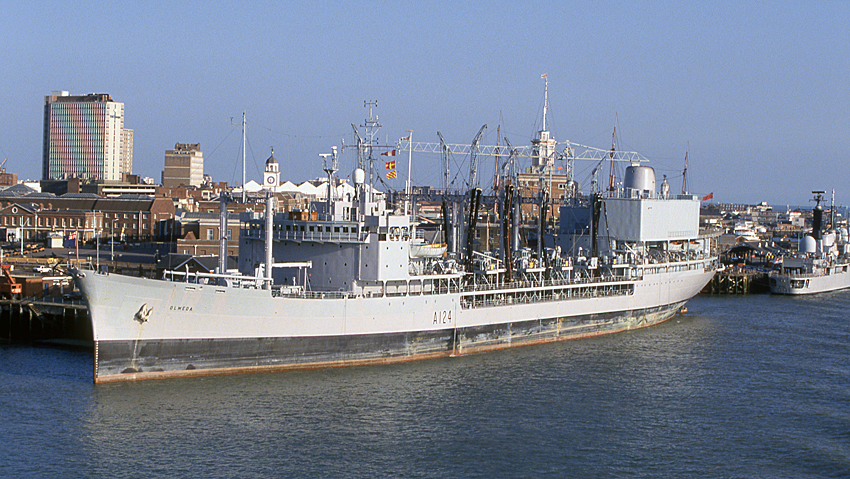
- RFA Olmeda

Class overview
- Name: Ol class
- Builders: Hawthorn Leslie and Company, Swan Hunter & Wigham Richardson
- Operators: Royal Fleet Auxiliary, Islamic Republic of Iran Navy
- Preceded by: Tide class
- Succeeded by: Wave class
- In service: 1965–2021
- Completed: 4
- Lost: 1
- Retired: 3

General characteristics
- Class & type: Fast fleet tanker
- Displacement: (full load); Olwen 33,773 long tons (34,315 t); Olna 36,605 long tons (37,192 t); Olmeda 33,240 long tons (33,773 t)
- Length: 648 ft (198 m)
- Beam: 84 ft 2 in (25.65 m)
- Draught: 34 ft (10 m)
- Depth: 44 ft (13 m)
- Installed power: 2x Babcock and Wilcox superheat boilers; 26,500 shaft horsepower (19,800 kW)
- Propulsion: 2× Pametrada steam turbines, double reduction geared; Single shaft; Bow thruster
- Speed: 21 kn (24 mph; 39 km/h)
- Range: 10,000 nmi (19,000 km) at 16 kn (18 mph; 30 km/h)
- Complement: 88 RFA; 40 RN
- Armament: 2× 20 mm guns; 2× Chaff launchers
- Aircraft carried: 3× Westland Wessex or Westland Sea King helicopters
- Aviation facilities: Helicopter deck, hangar

The Ol-class tankers were a series of three "fast fleet tankers" used by the Royal Fleet Auxiliary (RFA), the naval auxiliary fleet of the United Kingdom, tasked with providing fuel, food, fresh water, ammunition and other supplies to Royal Navy vessels around the world.

== Class history ==
In 1962, plans included support ships capable of maintaining “fleet speed” (defined as sustained steaming at 20 knots (37 km/h; 23 mph)) and early mentions proposed six ships. On 4 February 1963, an order had been placed for three ships, to be known as the Olynthus class. They were designed by the builders to meet specific requirements. When they entered service they were the largest and fastest ships in the Royal Fleet Auxiliary, capable of operating 3 x Westland Sea King helicopters.

The three ships in the class, RFA Olwen, RFA Olmeda and RFA Olna, were an evolution of the earlier Tide-class replenishment oilers. The lead ship of the class was launched as RFA Olynthus, thus becoming known as Olynthus class although she was renamed RFA Olwen in 1967, to avoid confusion with HMS Olympus. Consequently, the class became Olwen class, and thereafter Ol class. Similarly, RFA Olmeda originally entered service as RFA Oleander, but was later renamed to avoid confusion with HMS Leander.

The ships saw service in a wide range of locations and conflicts, including during Operation Corporate, and which also saw Olmeda take part in the recapture of Thule Island, and in the Persian Gulf during the 1991 Operation Granby.

The ships were replaced by the Wave-class tankers. One modified Ol-class vessel, Kharg, was built for the former Imperial Iranian Navy in 1977. The vessel was delivered to the Islamic Republic of Iran Navy in 1984, and was lost on 2 June 2021.

== Design ==
The class were designed to be 185.9 metres (610 ft) long, 25.6 metres (84 ft) breadth and 11.1 metres (36 ft) draught, with a fully loaded displacement of 36,000 tonnes (35,000 long tons; 40,000 short tons) and achieve a speed of 21 knots (39 km/h; 24 mph). A normal complement consisted of 88 RFA and 40 RN personnel. The ships were armed with two x 20 mm guns and two Chaff rocket launchers. They each had four pairs of replenishment rigs which were located between the forward and aft superstructures. They were able to carry four types of fuels: Furnace Fuel Oil, Diesel, Avcat and Mogas. Limited supplies of lubricating oils, fresh water and dry stores could also be carried. The ships each had constructed at their aft a helicopter flight deck with a hangar.

== Construction programme ==
| Name | Pennant | Builder | Laid down | Launched | In service | Out of service |
Royal Fleet Auxiliary
| Olwen (ex-Olynthus) | A122 | Hawthorn Leslie and Company, Tyneside | 11 July 1963 | 10 July 1964 | 12 July 1965 | 19 September 2000 |
| Olna | A123 | Hawthorn Leslie and Company, Tyneside | 2 July 1964 | 28 July 1965 | 1 April 1966 | 24 September 2000 |
| Olmeda (ex-Oleander) | A124 | Swan Hunter & Wigham Richardson, Wallsend, Tyne and Wear | 27 August 1963 | 10 July 1964 | 19 October 1965 | January 1994 |
Iranian Navy
| Kharg | 431 | Swan Hunter & Wigham Richardson, Wallend | 27 January 1976 | 3 February 1977 | 5 October 1984 | 2 June 2021 - Sank |

== Decommissioning and fate ==
In July 1994 Olmeda was sold for £1.2m to Singaporean owners and renamed Niaxco. She then sailed under her own power from HMNB Portsmouth to Alang Ship Breaking Yard in India, arriving in August.

In 1999 Olwen was wthdrawn from service and laid up at Portsmouth and on 19 September 2000 she was handed over for disposal; purchased by the Eckhardt Organisation, Germany, for scrap. Then in January 2001 she was renamed Kea for the move to the breakers.

On 24 September 2000 Olna was laid up at Portsmouth and on 12 October she was handed over for disposal. In February 2001 she was also purchased by the Eckhardt Organisation in Germany for scrap. In May it came to light that both Olna and Olwen had been banned from Turkish yards due to a high asbestos content. Olna was diverted to Greece and renamed Kos. She then sailed via the Suez Canal to Alang Ship Breaking Yard in India, arriving on 20 June.

Olwen was also diverted to Greece and she then also sailed via the Suez Canal to Alang, arriving on 21 July 2001.

On 2 June 2021, the modified Ol-class fleet replenishment oiler of the Islamic Republic of Iran Navy, Kharg, caught fire, and sank near Jask in the Gulf of Oman. All 400 crew were rescued, with 33 reported injured.

== Gallery ==
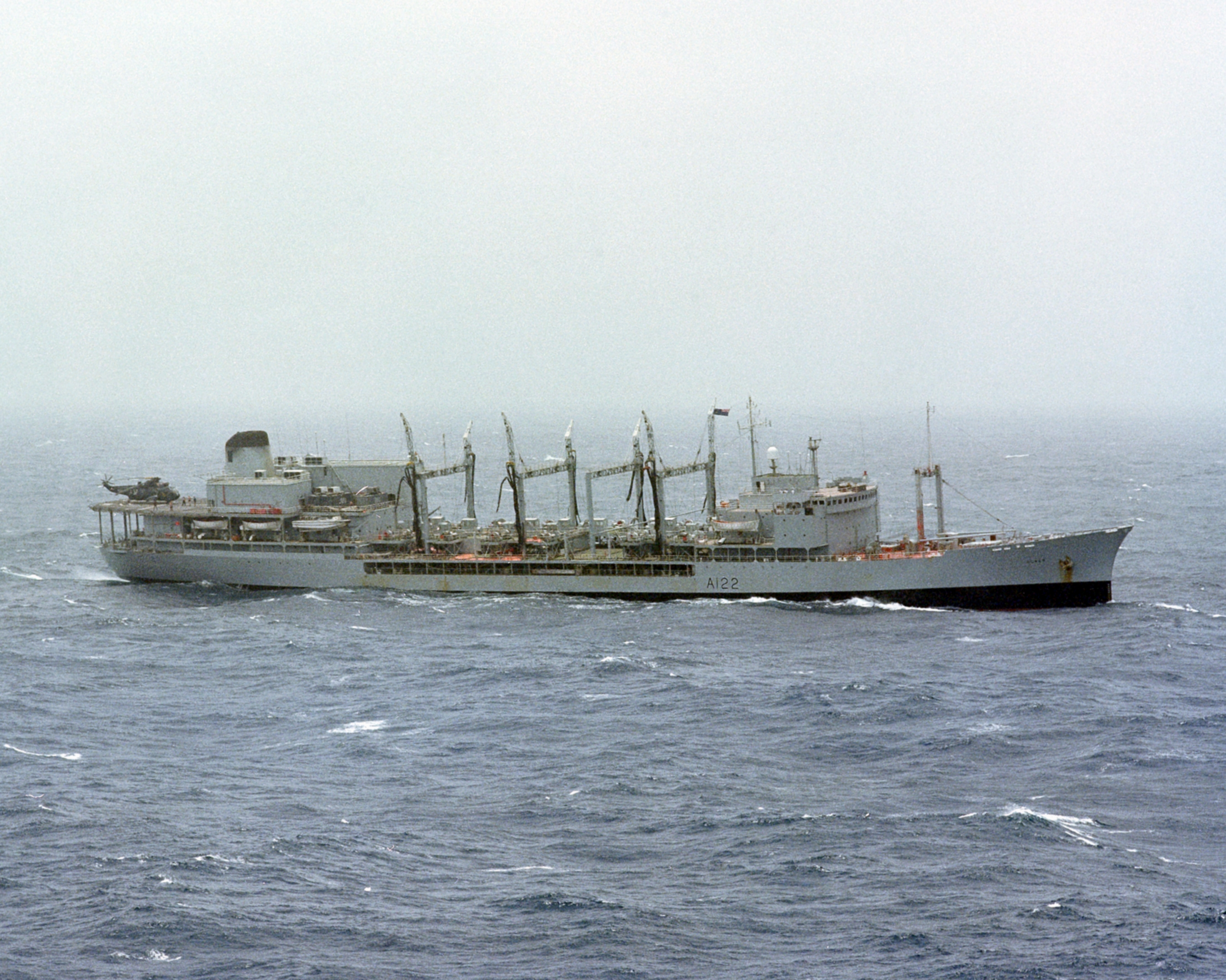
RFA Olwen in 1982.

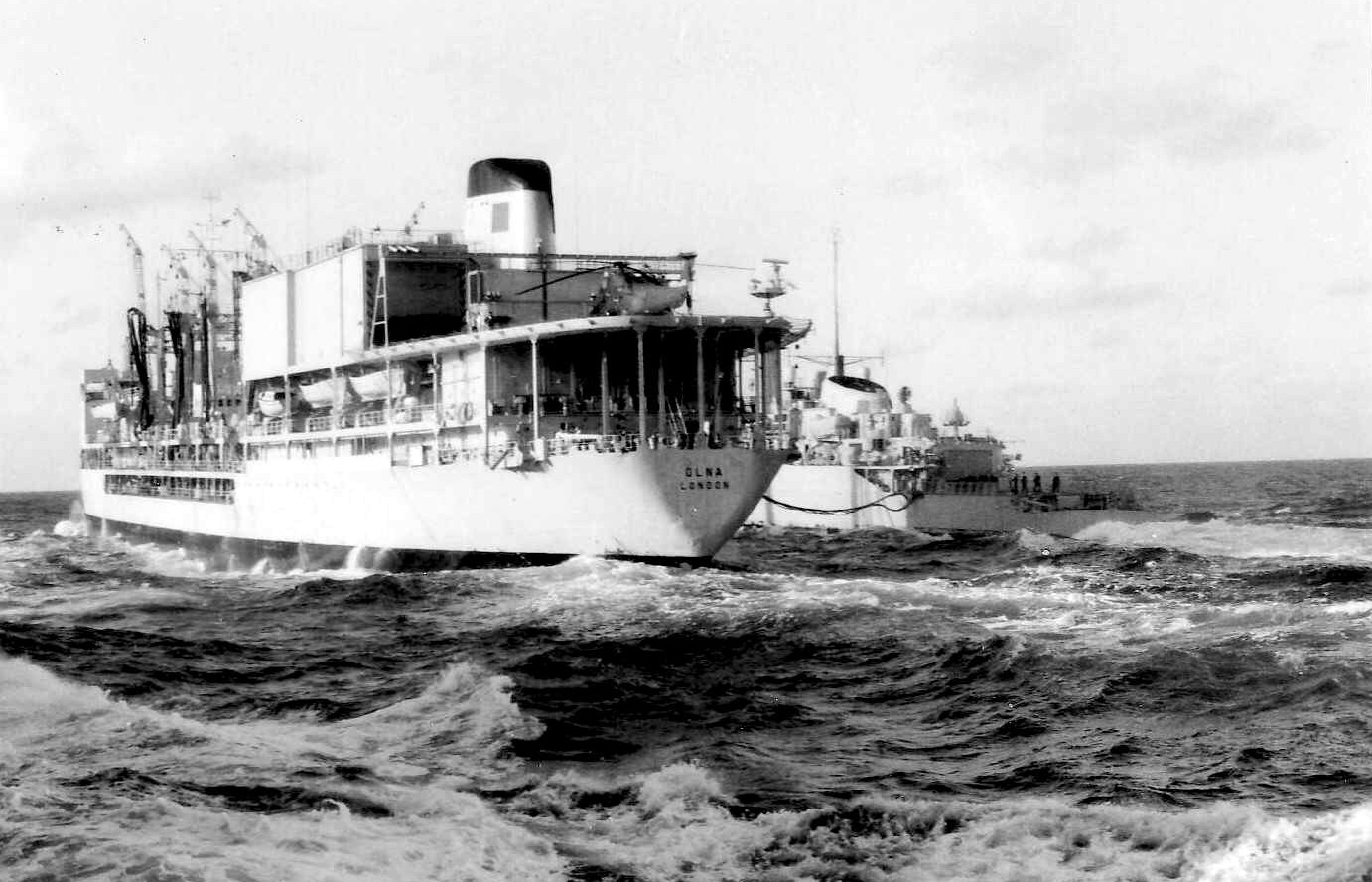
Bristol Group - A Type 21 frigate conducting replenishment at sea (RAS) with RFA Olna. May 1982. Picture taken from HMS Cardiff

== See also ==
- List of replenishment ships of the Royal Fleet Auxiliary
