= Bristol group =

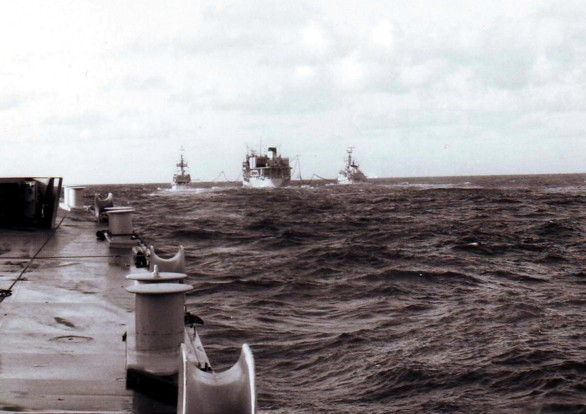
Olna refueling two frigates at sea in May 1982

The Bristol group was a group of British warships that were sent to the "Total Exclusion Zone" as reinforcements late in the Falklands War. The majority sailed from the UK on 10 May 1982. The group consisted of:

Destroyers

- HMS Bristol (D23), Type 82
- HMS Cardiff (D108), Type 42 joined group en route having started in Gibraltar

Frigates

- HMS Active (F171), Type 21 frigate
- HMS Andromeda (F57), Leander class
- HMS Avenger (F185), Type 21 frigate
- HMS Minerva (F45), Leander class
- HMS Penelope (F127), Leander class

Royal Fleet Auxiliaries

- RFA Bayleaf, support tanker
- RFA Olna, fleet tanker

The group reached the task force around 26 May.
