= RFA Olna (A123) =

1966 Ol-class fast fleet tanker of the Royal Fleet Auxiliary

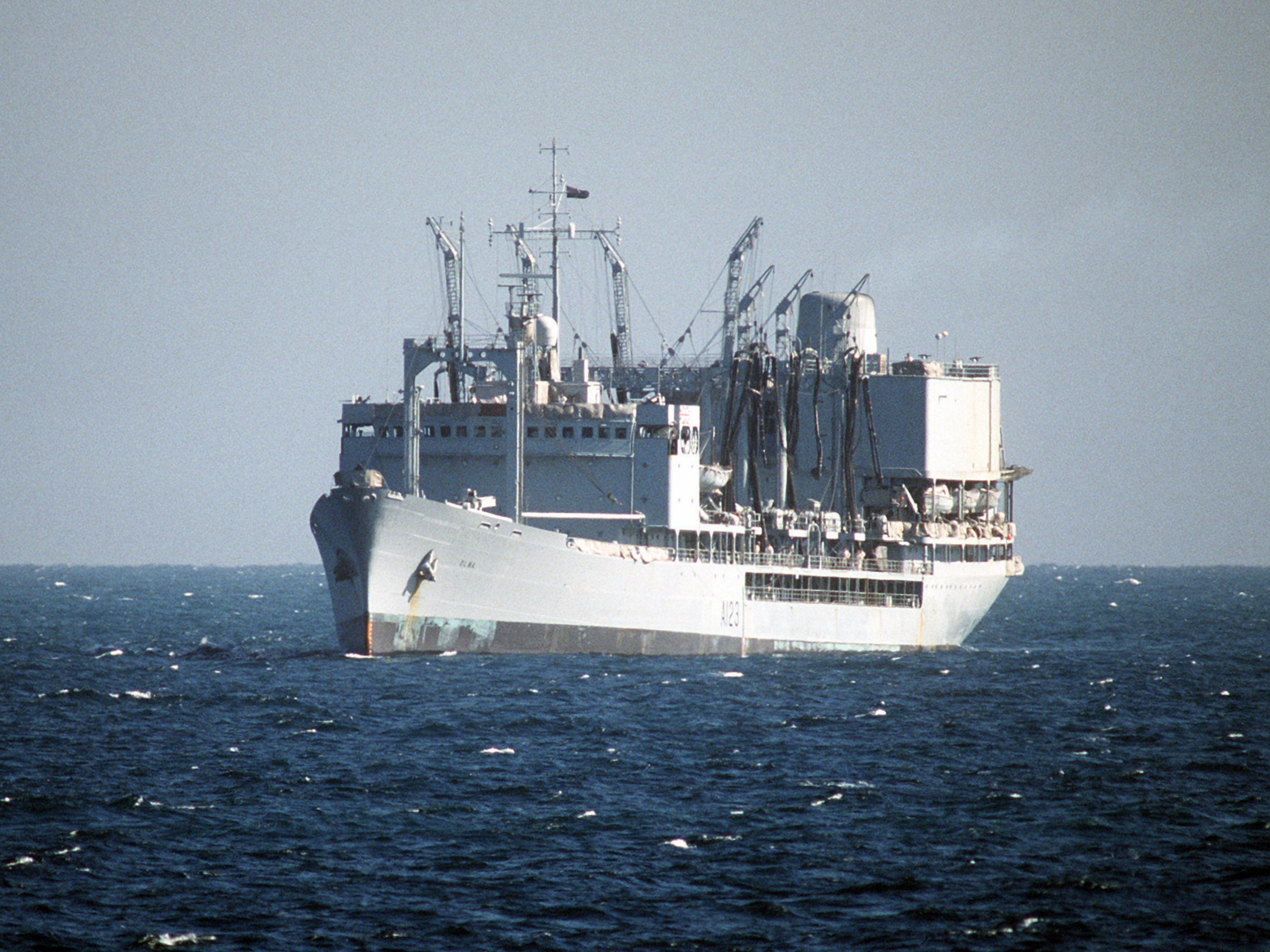
- RFA Olna underway in 1991

History

United Kingdom
- Name: RFA Olna
- Ordered: 4 February 1963 as AO 16
- Builder: Hawthorn Leslie and Company
- Yard number: 756
- Laid down: 2 July 1964
- Launched: 28 July 1965 by Barbara Redman
- In service: 1 April 1966
- Out of service: 24 September 2000
- Identification: IMO number: 6519467; Callsign: GOGS; Pennant number: A123; Flight deck: ON
- Honours and awards: Falkland Islands 1982; Kuwait 1991
- Fate: Renamed Kos in May 2001.; Arrived Alang for demolition 20 June 2001.
- Badge

General characteristics
- Class & type: Ol-class tanker
- Tonnage: 18,582 GRT; 9,367 NRT; 22,350 DWT
- Displacement: 36,605 long tons (37,192 t) full load
- Length: 648 ft (198 m)
- Beam: 84 ft 2 in (25.65 m)
- Draught: 34 ft (10 m)
- Depth: 44 ft (13 m)
- Installed power: 2× Babcock & Wilcox selectable superheat boilers; 26,500 shp (19,761 kW)
- Propulsion: 2× Pametrada steam turbines, double reduction gearbox to single screw; Bow thrust propeller; 3825 tons FFO, consumption 160 TPD at max power
- Speed: 21 knots (24 mph; 39 km/h)
- Range: 10,000 nmi (19,000 km) at 16 kn (18 mph; 30 km/h)
- Complement: 88 RFA; 40 RN
- Armament: 2× 20 mm guns; 2× Chaff launchers
- Aircraft carried: 3× Westland Wessex or Westland Sea King helicopters
- Aviation facilities: Helicopter deck, hangar

Service record
- Operations: Operation Magister; Operation Corporate; Operation Granby

RFA Olna (A123) was the third and final of the three Ol-class "fast fleet tanker" of the Royal Fleet Auxiliary (RFA), the naval auxiliary fleet of the United Kingdom. When she entered service she was one of the largest and fastest ships in the RFA Fleet. Olna saw service in the Falklands War and the Gulf War.

Her design was a development of the later Tide-class ships of the early 1960s. She was entered service in 1966 and served in the Royal Fleet Auxiliary for 34 years. Olna was the third ship to bear the name.

== Design and description ==
Olna had a normal complement consisting of 88 Royal Fleet Auxiliary personnel with provision for 40 Royal Navy personnel and she was armed with two 20 mm guns and two Corvus chaff launchers. She was designed to achieve a speed of 21 knots (39 km/h; 24 mph) with a fully loaded displacement of 36,000 tonnes (35,000 long tons; 40,000 short tons).

The ship had the capability to supply fuel and other liquid cargo to vessels using four pairs of replenishment rigs which were located between the forward and aft superstructures. She was able to carry four types of fuels: Furnace Fuel Oil, Diesel, Avcat and Mogas. Limited supplies of lubricating oils, fresh water and dry stores could also be carried. She could operate Westland Wessex or Westland Sea King helicopters, or other helicopters of similar size, from a hangar and flight deck at the stern.

== Operational history ==
Olna entered service as the UK was pulling back from its final large imperial garrisons. Much of the ship's early life was spent supporting routine deployments around the world.

On 19 June 1966, Olna rescued 26 survivors from the Greek liberty ship the SS Zaneta, which had sunk in the Arabian Sea. On 27 August she deployed to HMNB Devonport and was present at Plymouth Navy Days 1966.

From 20 September until 13 October 1968, Olna was deployed participating in Exercise Coral Sands which took place in the Solomon Sea, the Coral Sea and Shoalwater Bay, together with RFAs Tarbatness, Tidespring and Regent, alongside the Royal Navy’s Albion, Hermes, Glamorgan, Fife, Intrepid and Triumph, the Royal Australian Navy’s Sydney, Supply and Stalwart, and the Royal New Zealand Navy’s Waikato.

On 19 May 1971 she was involved in a collision with Regent, which occurred during a replenishment at sea (RAS), off Portland. A 10 feet (3.0 m) hole was discovered once the RAS was completed which was serious enough for Olna to be ordered to discharge and tank clean in Portsmouth. She then sailed to Southampton for emergency dry dock, returning later to anchor off Portland. The following day the Standing Naval Force Atlantic (STANAVFORLANT) flotilla left HMNB Portland. Hovering above the ships a Fleet Air Arm Westland Wessex HAS.1 helicopter, XM875, which was carrying five press photographers, lost power and ditched. Three photographers were killed in the incident.

In July 1974 Olna was part of the Task Force including: the Centaur-class aircraft carrier Hermes with, No. 41 (Royal Marine) Commando, and RFA’s Gold Rover, Olwen and Regent, she stood by in Akritori Bay, off Cyprus, supporting evacuations, following a Greek junta-sponsored Cypriot coup d'état attempt and the subsequent Turkish invasion of Cyprus.

On 17 September 1974 along with RFA’s Green Rover and Stromness she sailed as part of Task Group 317.2 for a Far East deployment, led by the Royal Navy’s helicopter cruiser Blake with the Leander-class frigates Achilles, Diomede and the lead ship Leander, along with the Rothesay-class frigates Falmouth and Lowestoft. Between 14 and 21 October the Task Group visited the South African Navy’s base at Simon’s Town, near Cape Town, en route. On 10 and 11 March 1975 Olna was deployed to provide humanitarian aid, under Operation Faldage, she stood by off Kompong Som, Cambodia along with the helicopter cruiser Blake to evacuate British nationals.

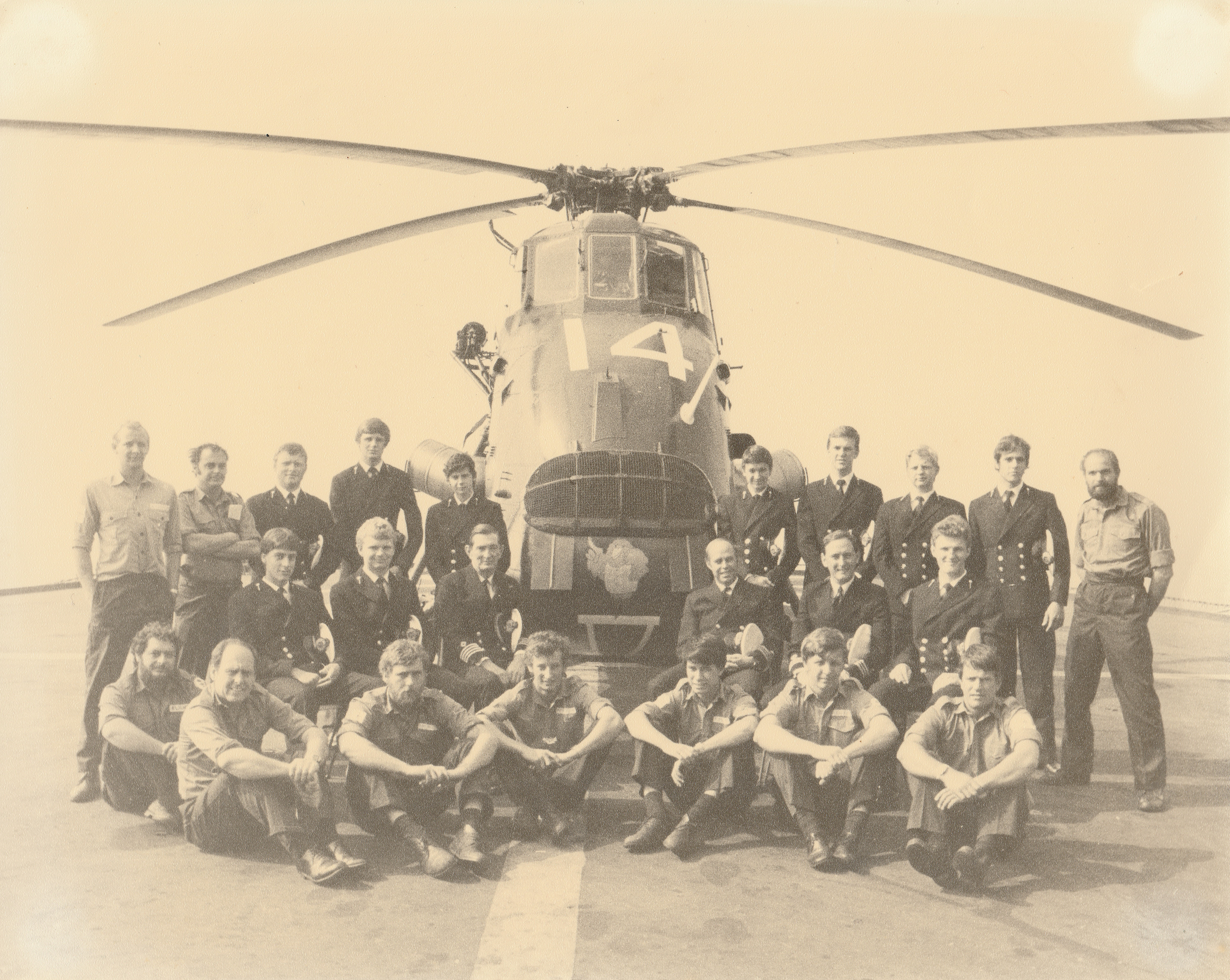
Wessex HU.5 XS507, 772 Naval Air Squadron 'C' Flight, RFA Olna, March 1982

In February 1982 Olna deployed to the Persian Gulf along with the Type 42 destroyer, Cardiff, and the lead ship of her class, the frigate Amazon. Embarked in Olna was Westland Wessex HU.5 helicopter, XS507 of 772 Naval Air Squadron (coded 314 ON), named "buzby". The vessel needed to return to the UK to clean contaminated fuel tanks and on route she anchored off Gibraltar to wait for the converted hospital ship for Operation Corporate, SS Uganda (1952). Olna undertook refuelling at sea trials with Uganda and Westland Wessex HU.5 helicopter, XS507 carried out the first deck landing. Uganda then sailed to the South Atlantic and Olna returned to the UK, arriving during April.

=== Falklands War ===
In 1982 Olna left for the South Atlantic as part of the second wave of ships to leave the UK during the Falklands War. That group was centred on the destroyer HMS Bristol. Once Olna reached theatre, her time was primarily spent fuelling the carrier battle group.

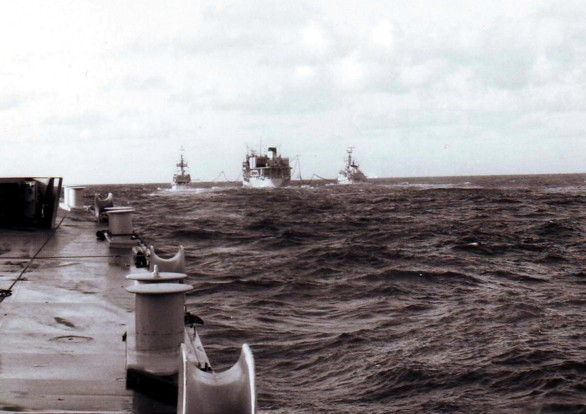
Olna replenishing frigates as part of the Bristol Group en route to the Falklands War in 1982

=== 1983-2000 ===
In 1990, another wartime deployment beckoned. As forces built up in the Persian Gulf, Olna joined the British task force on station. Olna arrived in August 1990, shortly after Iraq invaded Kuwait, and apart from a short maintenance period in Singapore was on station for the whole duration of the conflict. Olna operated further north than any other tanker as the US Navy was wary of mines after two ships had been severely damaged.

At the end of the 1990s, retirement was in sight. 1999 and 2000 were spent in mothballs at Gibraltar until the outbreak of a crisis in Sierra Leone called for Olna to make one last deployment. The ship did not proceed to Sierra Leone, but instead relieved other RFA vessels of participation in a major exercise off Scotland. Following this exercise, the ship returned to reserve and decommissioned soon thereafter.

== Decommissioning ==
In February 2001 Olna was sold to Eckhardt Organisation for scrap and on 9 March she was towed out from Portsmouth. However, in May it was revealed she had been banned from Turkish yards owing to the high quantity of asbestos aboard and was diverted to Greece. She was renamed Kos and sailed via the Suez Canal, arriving at Alang Ship Breaking Yard, India, on 20 June 2001.

== Battle honours ==
On 11 January 1985, RFA Olna was awarded her Falkland Islands 1982 Battle Honour, by Rear Admiral John C. Worsop, CB, RN, – Flag Officer, Portsmouth.

== See also ==
- List of replenishment ships of the Royal Fleet Auxiliary
