= BAE Systems Marine =

Erstwhile British defence company

BAE Systems Marine Limited
- Company type: Private
- Industry: Shipbuilding; Marine engineering
- Predecessor: Yarrow Shipbuilders; Kvaerner Govan; Vickers Shipbuilding and Engineering
- Founded: 1999
- Fate: Split-up
- Successor: BAE Systems Submarines; BAE Systems Naval Ships
- Headquarters: Scotstoun, Glasgow, Scotland
- Key people: Simon Kirby (Managing Director)
- Parent: BAE Systems

BAE Systems Marine Limited was the shipbuilding subsidiary of BAE Systems, formed in 1999, which manufactured the full range of naval ships; nuclear submarines, frigates, destroyers, amphibious ships. While the company remains active, it now operates as separate entities as in 2003 BAE Systems Marine was split into separate submarine and surface ship units; BAE Systems Submarines and BAE Systems Naval Ships. The latter was merged into a BAE Systems/VT Group joint venture, BVT Surface Fleet in 2008, which subsequently became BAE Systems Surface Ships in 2009.

== History ==
BAE Systems Marine was created following the merger of Marconi Electronic Systems (MES) and British Aerospace (BAe) to form BAE Systems in 1999. Like other parts of the business (e.g. Marconi Avionics) the former Marconi Marine was required to be "firewalled" within the new company.

Marconi Marine owned the major assets which made up BAE Systems Marine:

- BAE Systems Marine (YSL)
- BAE Systems Marine (VSEL)
- BAE Systems Marine (Kvaerner Govan)

In 2003 the YSL and Govan shipyards were placed under the control of a new unit of BAE, BAE Systems Naval Ships. The shipyard at Barrow became part of BAE Systems Submarine Solutions. This reorganisation was, to quote the company, "to provide a focus on the UK and export surface warship building market."

== See also ==
- Marconi Scientists - Article about the 25+ defence employees who have died in mysterious circumstances since the early 1980s
