= Dracone barge =

A dracone barge is a large flexible watertight tube intended to carry a liquid cargo while towed mostly-submerged behind a ship. One large example of the type has a capacity of 935 cubic metres (4.23 m diameter, 91 m long) while weighing only 6.5 tonnes empty.

The dracone barge was invented in 1956 by professor William Hawthorne as a new type of oil tanker. The intent was to create an improved transport technology: the long tube can be pulled by a lower powered vessel than the equivalent tanker, the cargo can be handed off at the destination very quickly, and incurs no drag cost when empty (because it can easily be taken aboard), as compared to the similar unladen to laden drag of the rigid-hulled tanker of equivalent capacity.

Dracone Developments Ltd used hangers at Calshot Spit in Hampshire for experimentation on design and methods of construction used for dracones. Dracones were initially made from rubberproofed fabrics stitched and glued together. Towing the dracones caused delamination of the rubberproofed fabric due to the continual flexing of the tail of the dracone. Later dracones used a nose section and a tail section fabricated like motor tyres with cords embedded in a rubber matrix. These would flex continually without fear of damage caused by friction between the cords embedded in the rubber. These cones were affixed to the central portion of rubberproofed fabric by stitching and glueing them together.

Dracones designed to transport fresh water were constructed with neoprene or butyl rubber on both sides of the nylon fabric cloth. However where hydrocarbons such as fuels were carried, the inner rubber lining was made with nitrile rubber.

The daytime signal (known as a day shape) for dracone is a diamond shape at or near the aftermost extremity of the last vessel or object being towed and if the length of the tow exceeds 200 metres an additional diamond shape where it can best be seen and located as far forward as is practicable. According to the USCG's 72Colregs, for light signals, dracones less than 25 metres breadth (82.02 ft) should display one all-round white light at each end. However, the "forward" light may be omitted. Provided, however, dracones with a breadth of 25 meters or longer MUST display one all-round white at each end and two additional all-round white lights on each side of its maximum breadth. Dracones exceeding 100 metres shall display additional all-round white lights between the fore and aft lights not to exceed 100 metres between these additional lights. While being towed by a vessel it displays only one all round light so that it can be seen by other vessels and risk of collision can be reduced.

The common modern use (described in a patent application filed by BP in 1972 in combination with capture booms) is in the clean-up of petroleum spills or pollution slicks, where any small and manoeuvrable vessel (e.g. a harbour tug) with pumping gear mounted on it can gather up a much larger volume of liquid than it can carry by pumping it promptly back over the side into a tanker or dracone barge. A secondary, but related use, is the offloading of bilge water from large ships that must be treated (at a shore-side facility) and not dumped directly into the sea.

The vessels were given the name "dracone" as it was "the nearest word in Greek for a mythical monster such as a sea serpent". However, one year earlier Frank Herbert wrote his first novel The Dragon in the Sea about submarines towing large bags to carry oil, and other sources say the naming was an "overt acknowledgment of the source of his idea".

== See also ==
- Flexible barge
