= RFA Olwen (A122) =

1965 Ol-class fast fleet tanker of the Royal Fleet Auxiliary

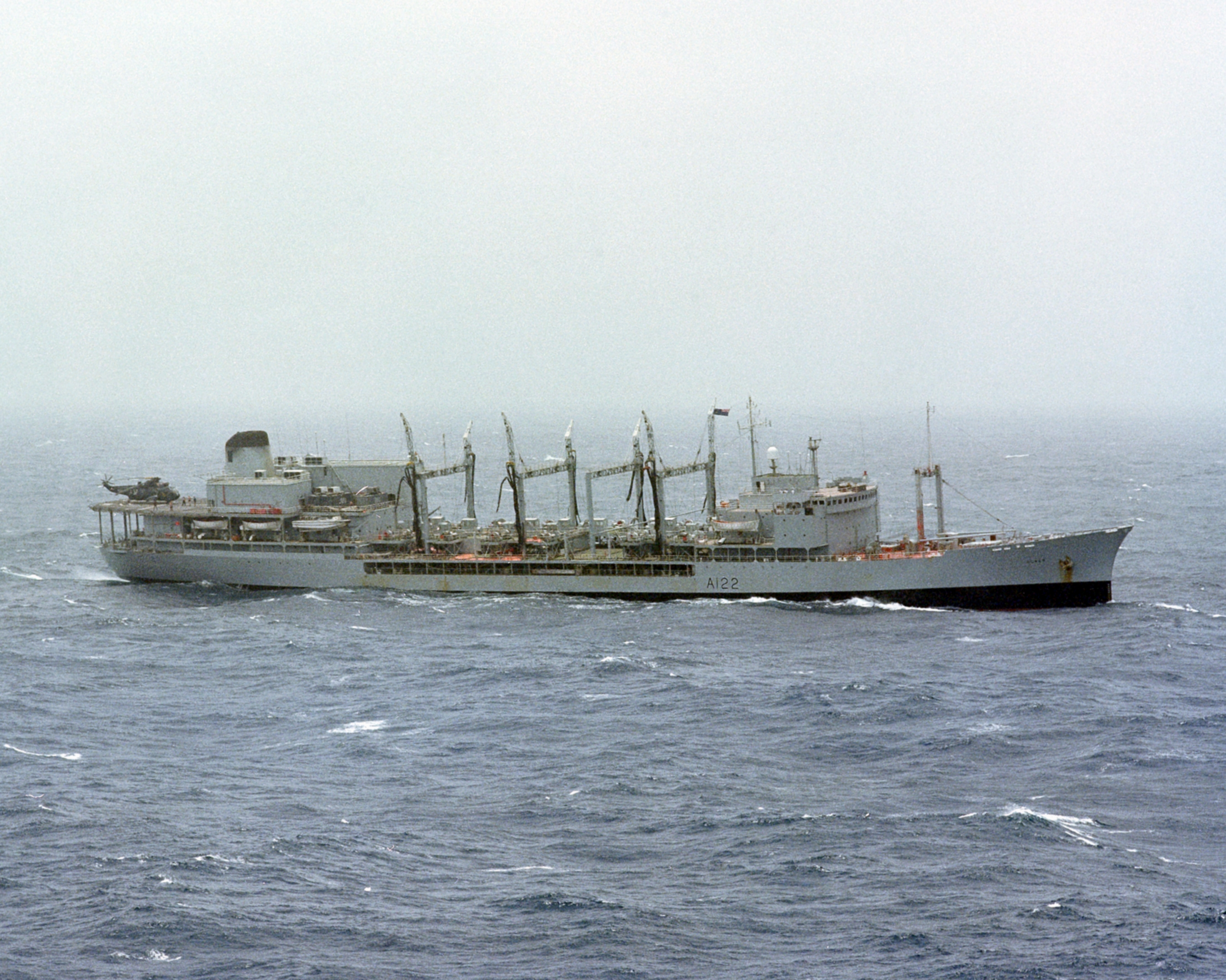
- RFA Olwen in the 1980s

History

United Kingdom
- Name: RFA Olwen
- Ordered: 4 February 1963 as AO 15
- Builder: Hawthorn Leslie and Company
- Yard number: 755
- Laid down: 11 July 1963
- Launched: 10 July 1964, as Olynthus
- In service: 12 June 1965
- Out of service: 19 September 2000
- Renamed: Olwen, 5 August 1967
- Identification: IMO number: 6418572; Callsign: GQKA; Pennant number: A122; Deck code: OW
- Fate: Renamed Kea in May 2001.; Arrived Alang for demolition 21 July 2001.
- Badge

General characteristics
- Class & type: Ol-class tanker
- Tonnage: 18,604 GRT; 9,392 NRT; 22,350 DWT
- Displacement: 33,773 long tons (34,315 t) (full load)
- Length: 648 ft (198 m)
- Beam: 84 ft 2 in (25.65 m)
- Draught: 34 ft (10 m)
- Depth: 44 ft (13 m)
- Installed power: 2x Babcock and Wilcox superheat boilers; 26,500 shaft horsepower (19,800 kW)
- Propulsion: 2× Hawthorn Leslie/Pametrada steam turbines, double reduction geared; Single shaft; Bow thruster
- Speed: 21 knots (24 mph; 39 km/h)
- Range: 10,000 nmi (19,000 km) at 16 kn (18 mph; 30 km/h)
- Complement: 88 RFA; 40 RN
- Armament: 2× 20 mm guns; 2× Chaff launchers
- Aircraft carried: 3× Westland Wessex or Westland Sea King helicopters
- Aviation facilities: Helicopter deck, hangar

Service record
- Operations: Operation Burlap; Operation Journeyman; Operation Grapple

RFA Olwen (A122) was an Ol-class "fast fleet tanker" of the Royal Fleet Auxiliary (RFA), the naval auxiliary fleet of the United Kingdom. She was the lead ship of her class, and launched in 1964 as RFA Olynthus, the second ship to bear this name.

She with her two sisters, were initially known as the Olynthus class. Her design was a development of the two later 1961 Tide-class replenishment oilers. She was renamed Olwen in 1967 to avoid confusion with the Oberon-class submarine, HMS Olympus. The class were then redesignated as the Olwen class and later the Ol class.

== Design and description ==
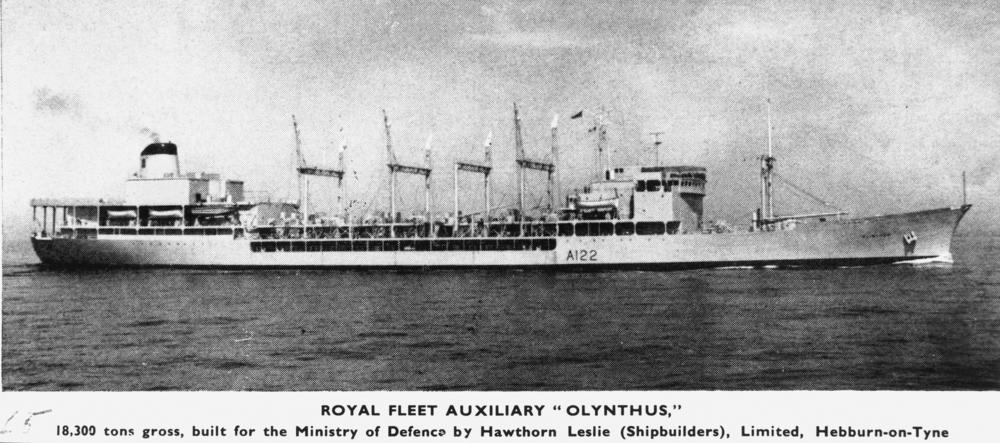
Fast fleet tanker RFA Olynthus (later Olwen)

Olwen had a normal complement consisting of 88 Royal Fleet Auxiliary personnel with provision for 40 Royal Navy personnel and she was armed with two 20 mm guns and two Corvus chaff launchers. She was designed to achieve a speed of 21 knots (39 km/h; 24 mph) with a fully loaded displacement of 36,000 tonnes (35,000 long tons; 40,000 short tons).

The ship had the capability to supply fuel and other liquid cargo to vessels using four pairs of replenishment rigs which were located between the forward and aft superstructures. She was able to carry four types of fuels: Furnace Fuel Oil, Diesel, Avcat and Mogas. Limited supplies of lubricating oils, fresh water and dry stores could also be carried. She could operate Westland Wessex or Westland Sea King helicopters, or other helicopters of similar size, from a hangar and flight deck at the stern.

== Operational history ==
In August 1965 she took part in the Fleet Review in the Firth of Clyde along with RFA's Black Ranger, Resurgent, Rowanol and Wave Prince and she then deployed to HMNB Devonport and was present at Plymouth Navy Days 1965, as RFA Olynthus.

She received detached Westland Wessex HAS.1 helicopter of 814 Naval Air Squadron as Olynthus Flight, while in support of HMS Victorious’s 1966/67 Far East deployment. While flying the flag of the Commander-in-Chief, Far East Fleet, Vice Admiral Sir Frank Twiss KCB, DSC, she replenished the Royal Australian Navy’s (RAN) River-class destroyer escort, HMAS Parramatta (DE 46), on 20 December 1966, and also participated in a CASEX A17 along with the Royal Navy’s Amphion-class submarine, HMS Andrew (P423/S23/S63) and from RAF Changi, Singapore, a 205 Squadron Avro Shackleton, a maritime patrol aircraft.

In November and December 1970 Olwen was involved in Operation Burlap giving humanitarian assistance to East Pakistan after a cyclone caused extensive damage and flooding.

In the Second Cod War, Olwen supported Royal Navy ships three times off Iceland in 1973: from 24 June until 10 July, between 14 July and 27 July and then from 30 July until 10 August.

Between July and September 1974 Olwen was part of the Task Force including the Centaur-class aircraft carrier HMS Hermes with No. 41 (Royal Marine) Commando and RFA’s Gold Rover, Olna and Regent, she stood by off Cyprus following a Greek junta-sponsored Cypriot coup d'état attempt and the subsequent Turkish invasion of Cyprus.

Between 25 November to 19 December 1977, Olwen was involved with Operation Journeyman. She was part of a task force, led by the nuclear-powered submarine HMS Dreadnought, and comprised the Type 21 frigate HMS Alacrity and the Leander-class frigate HMS Phoebe, along with the armament stores ship RFA Resource, dispatched to the South Atlantic as a deterrent. The operation was secretly ordered to prevent a possible Argentinian invasion of the Falkland Islands after 50 Argentine "scientists" landed on South Thule. She stood back from the Falkland Islands in support of the frigates with an 819 Naval Air Squadron Westland Sea King helicopter embarked.

Between January and July 1993, Olwen was deployed to the Adriatic Sea to support Task Force 612 led by the Invincible-class aircraft carrier HMS Ark Royal off Bosnia, with RFA Fort Grange, under Operation Grapple, as part of the United Nations Protection Force (UNPROFOR). She operated with 2 Westland Sea King HAS.6 anti-submarine warfare helicopters, of 820 Naval Air Squadron.

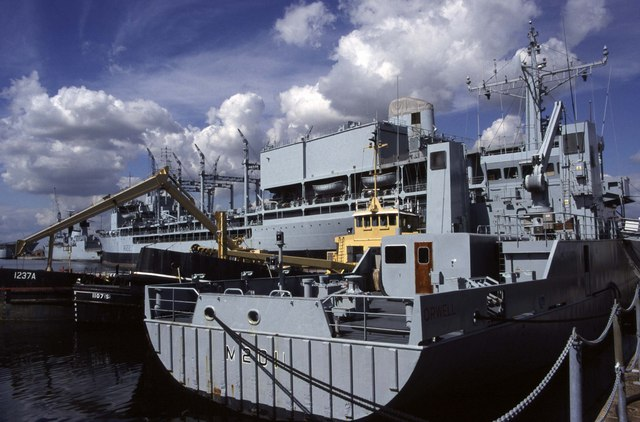
A view of RFA Olwen at HNMB Portsmouth

== Decommissioning ==
In 1999 Olwen was withdrawn from service and laid up at Portsmouth and on 19 September 2000 she was handed over for disposal; purchased by the Eckhardt Organisation, Germany, for scrap. Then in January 2001 she was renamed Kea for the move to the breakers. In May it came to light that she had been banned from Turkish yards due to a high asbestos content. She was diverted to Greece and later sailed via the Suez Canal to Alang Ship Breaking Yard in India, arriving on 21 July 2001.

== See also ==
- List of replenishment ships of the Royal Fleet Auxiliary
