= RFA Sir Tristram =

Round Table-class landing ship logistics of the Royal Fleet Auxiliary

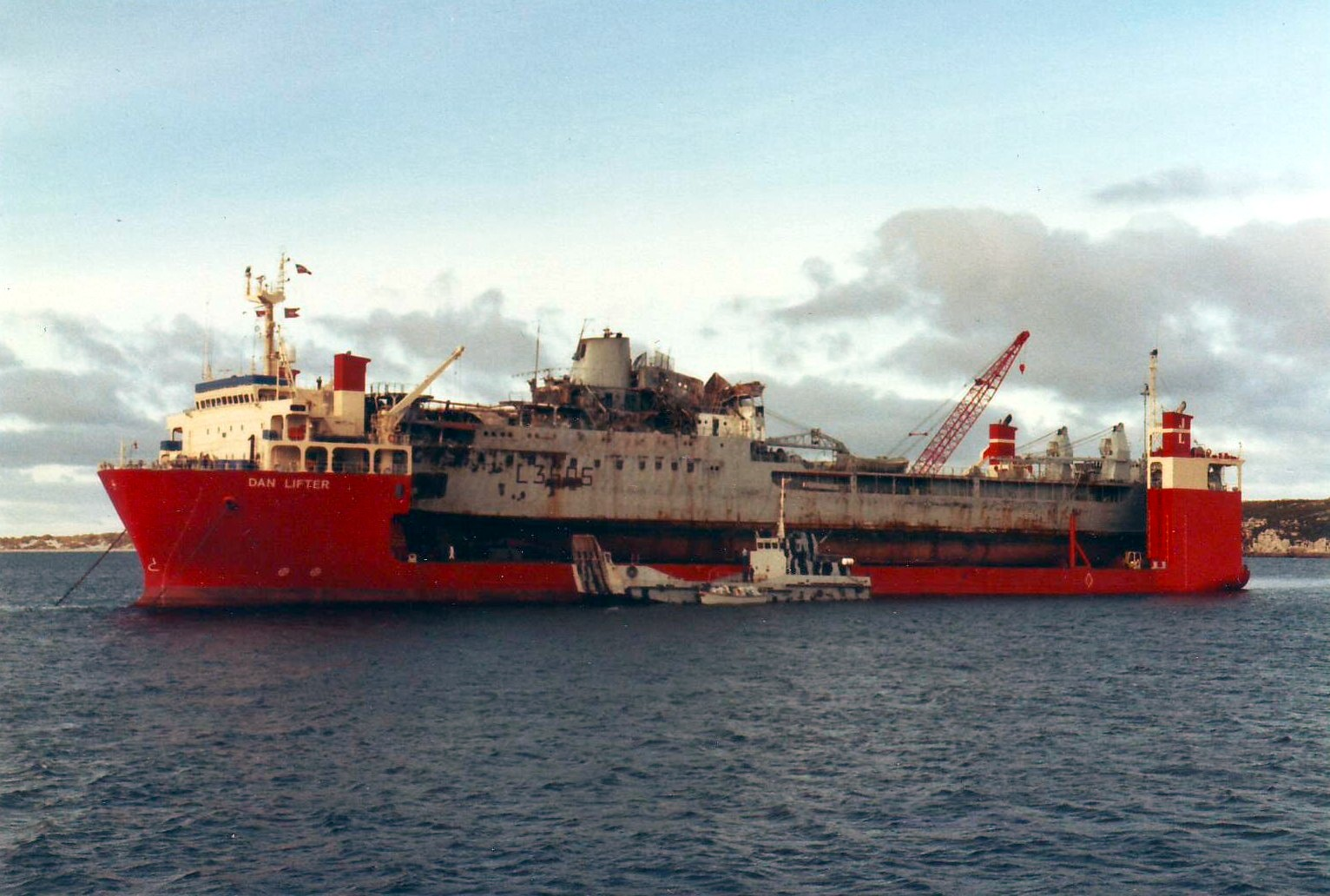
- Sir Tristram being carried home by the heavy lift ship MV Dan Lifter in 1983

History

United Kingdom
- Name: Sir Tristram
- Namesake: Tristan
- Builder: Hawthorn Leslie
- Laid down: February 1966
- Launched: 12 December 1966
- Commissioned: 14 September 1967
- Decommissioned: 16 December 2005
- Identification: IMO number: 6704373
- Status: Static training ship

General characteristics
- Class & type: Round Table-class landing ship logistics
- Displacement: 6,407 t (6,306 long tons)
- Length: 135.8 m (445 ft 6 in)
- Beam: 17.1 m (56 ft 1 in)
- Draught: 3.9 m (12 ft 10 in)
- Propulsion: 2 × 10-cylinder four-stroke turbo-charged Mirrlees National ALSSDM10 diesel engines; 9,400 hp (7,000 kW), 400 hp (300 kW) bow thruster
- Speed: 16 knots (30 km/h; 18 mph)
- Complement: 51
- Armament: 4 × Oerlikon 20 mm cannon; 4 × 7.62 mm machine guns
- Aircraft carried: One spot for Westland Sea King or Westland Lynx aft, one spot for Boeing Chinook, Sea King or Lynx on main vehicle deck

TV Sir Tristram (L3505) formerly RFA Sir Tristram, is a Round Table-class landing ship logistics that was converted to a Special Forces Training Vessel in 2008. She was launched in 1966, and accepted into British Army service in 1967. As with others of her class, she was transferred to the Royal Fleet Auxiliary in 1970, and was crewed by British officers and Hong Kong Chinese sailors. The ship saw service in the Falklands War of 1982, and was badly damaged at Fitzroy on 8 June.

== Early service ==
From completion to early 1970 Sir Tristram was managed by British India Steam Navigation Company. In January 1972 Sir Tristram was part of an anti-invasion task force off British Honduras, together with HMS Fearless, RFA Sir Bedivere and RFA Sir Geraint. In 1977 Sir Tristram was used as a guest ship for the Queens Silver Jubilee Fleet Review at Spithead in the Solent.

=== Falklands War ===
In April 1982 Sir Tristram was diverted from Belize to the Falkland Islands to take part in Operation Corporate, the British effort to retake the Falkland Islands.

On 8 June, while transporting men and equipment to Fitzroy Cove alongside the Sir Galahad, Sir Tristram was attacked by Douglas A-4 Skyhawks of the Argentine Air Force's V Brigada Aérea (FAA), each loaded with three 500 lb (230 kg) Mark 82 bombs. At approximately 14:00 local time the decks were strafed and two crew were killed. A 500 lb bomb penetrated the deck, but failed to explode immediately, allowing the remaining crew to be evacuated. Following the later explosion, Sir Tristram was abandoned. Immediately following the end of the conflict, Sir Tristram was towed to Port Stanley, where she was used as an accommodation ship. Sir Tristram then returned to the United Kingdom in 1983 on a heavy-lift ship and was extensively rebuilt.

== Rebuilt ==
Following the rebuild, Sir Tristram re-entered active service in 1985, and saw service in the Gulf War, and the Balkan conflicts of the 1990s. The ship supported relief operations for Hurricane Mitch off Central America. In 2000 the ship was deployed to Sierra Leone in support of British operations there, followed by a cruise to the Baltic Sea in support of mine countermeasure vessels. In early 2001 Sir Tristram returned to Sierra Leone to take over from RFA Sir Percivale as the ship supporting British forces ashore there. In 2003 the ship was deployed as part of the largest British fleet for 20 years in support of the invasion of Iraq.

== Training ship role ==
Sir Tristram in use as a training ship in Portland Harbour, 2026

The ship was decommissioned on 17 December 2005, but was given a new role as a static training vessel for use by the Special Boat Service and other elements of the UK Special Forces group.

She was taken to Falmouth Docks for conversion in 2007 and arrived at Portland Harbour on 23 August 2007 to begin her new role under the name TV Tristram. The ship underwent a six-week refit at Portland in 2013 and had another refit in 2016 in Middlesbrough. As of 2022, the plan was to extend the life of TV Tristram to 2026.
