= RFA Sir Percivale =

1968 Round Table-class landing ship logistics of the Royal Fleet Auxiliary

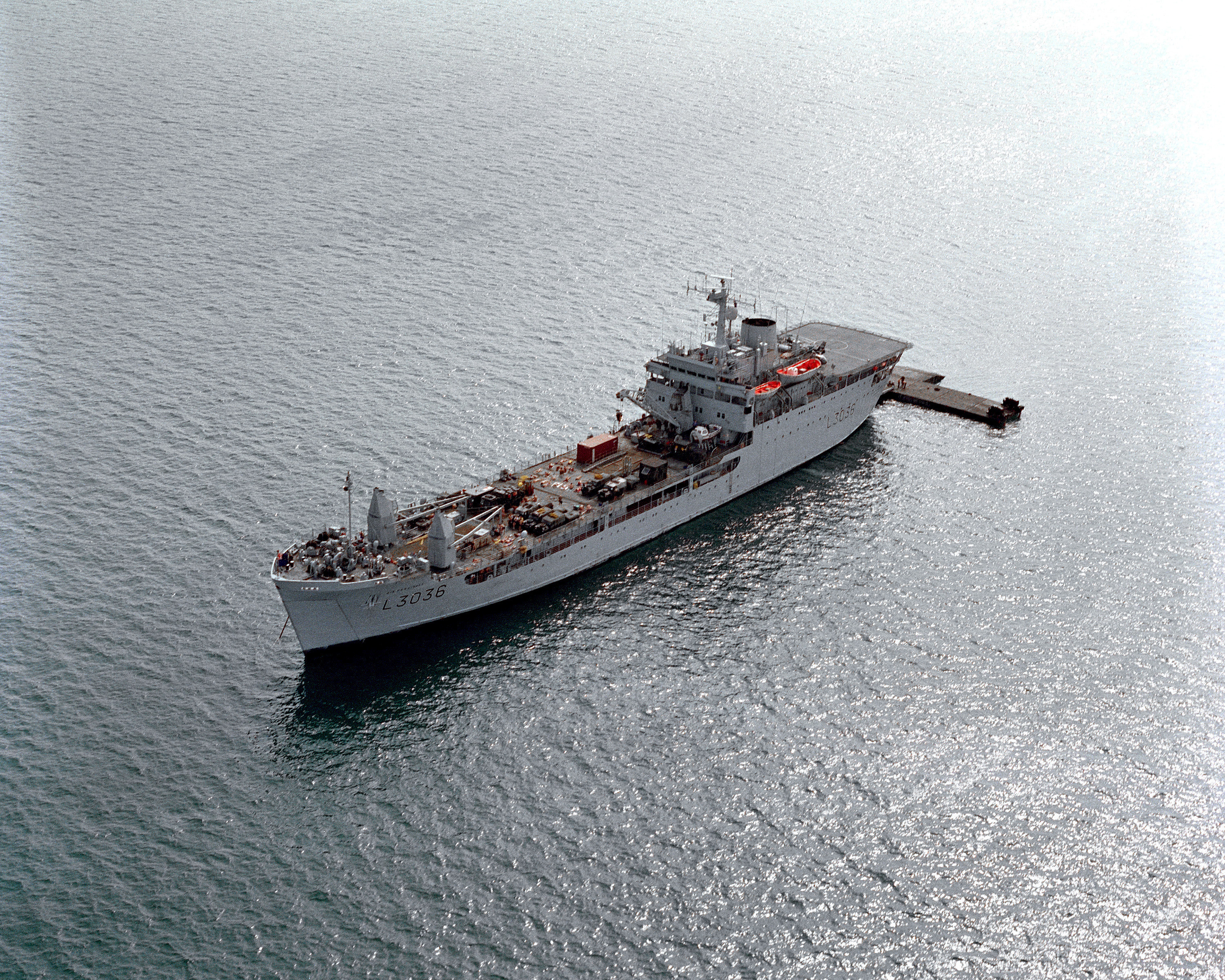
- RFA Sir Percivale (L3036)

History

United Kingdom
- Namesake: Percivale
- Laid down: May 1966
- Launched: 4 October 1967
- Commissioned: 23 March 1968
- Decommissioned: 17 August 2004
- Identification: IMO number: 6728642
- Fate: Scrapped 2009

General characteristics
- Class & type: Round Table class landing ship logistics
- Displacement: 5,674 t (5,584 long tons)
- Length: 125.5 m (411 ft 9 in)
- Beam: 18.2 m (59 ft 9 in)
- Draught: 3.9 m (12 ft 10 in)
- Propulsion: 2 × 10-cylinder four-stroke turbo-charged Mirrlees National ALSSDM10 diesel engines, 9,400 hp (7,000 kW); 400 hp (300 kW) Bow thruster
- Speed: 16 knots (18 mph; 30 km/h)
- Range: 8,000 nmi (15,000 km) at 15 knots (17 mph; 28 km/h)
- Complement: 51
- Armament: 4 × Oerlikon 20 mm cannon; 4 × 7.62 mm machine guns
- Aircraft carried: One spot for Westland Sea King or Westland Lynx aft, one spot for CH-47 Chinook, Sea King or Lynx on main vehicle deck

RFA Sir Percivale (L3036) was a Round Table class landing ship logistics (LSL) vessel belonging to the Royal Fleet Auxiliary of the United Kingdom.

Sir Percivale took part in the Falklands War and the 1991 Gulf War.

== Background ==
She originally entered British Army service in 1968, managed for the Ministry of Transport by British India Steam Navigation Company, but was taken over by the Royal Fleet Auxiliary along with the other members of the class in 1970.

== Operational history ==
In 1972, then again in 1973 & 1974, Sir Percivale supported monitoring operations on French atmospheric nuclear tests in the Pacific. A monitoring team was landed on Pitcairn Island and a tethered balloon was flown from Sir Percivale for atmospheric sampling. Vulcan and Victor aircraft were also used for high altitude sampling.

=== Falklands War ===
The first twelve years of the ship's life were quiet, with some time spent in the Pacific, until the Falklands War broke out in April 1982. Along with all the Navy's other amphibious assault shipping, Sir Percivale went south to participate in the recapture of the Falkland Islands. At this time, all the RFA ships were crewed by Hong Kong Chinese civilian sailors. She pioneered the supply runs to Teal Inlet and was the first British ship to re-enter Stanley Harbour. Unlike the Sir Galahad, Sir Tristram and Sir Lancelot, the ship emerged unscathed from the conflict.

=== 1991-1999 ===
The ship served in the Gulf War in 1991 and twice deployed to the Adriatic to support British operations in the Balkans.

In 1996 Sir Percivale took part in combined exercises with Jordan, followed by Green Wader 96, the first exercise of the then newly formed Amphibious Squadron of the Joint Rapid Deployment Force. In 1997, the ship took part in the large Ocean Wave 97 deployment to the far east and was present for the handover of Hong Kong to the Chinese. Following this ceremony, Sir Percivale escorted the ships of the former Hong Kong Squadron (3 Peacock class patrol vessel) to their new owners in the Philippines. During other parts of Ocean Wave, the ship took Royal Marines to Brunei, Singapore and Thailand for various exercises. 1998 saw further exercises as Sir Percivale took part in practice amphibious assaults in Norway, France and Spain.

=== 2000-2004 ===
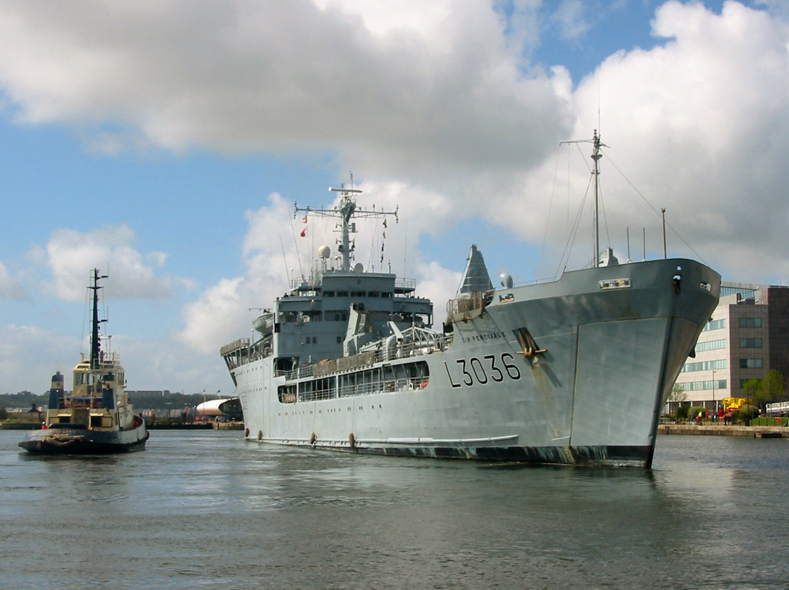
Sir Percivale, 2004

In 2000, Sir Percivale was deployed to Sierra Leone to support British forces training the army of that country. In September 2000, the ship was alongside in Freetown when British forces who had been taken hostage were rescued in a raid by the Parachute Regiment and the SAS ("Operation Barras"). Since then the ship has been deployed during operations connected with Afghanistan in 2001 and Iraq in 2003.

The ship was to have a SLEP overhaul, but an equivalent overhaul of Sir Bedivere proved so costly that plans were abandoned and new ships were procured instead.

Sir Percivale was decommissioned on 17 August 2004 and was laid up alongside at Marchwood Military Port, Southampton.

The ship was sold to Leavesley International and scrapping commenced in Canada Dock, Liverpool on 16 December 2009.
