= RFA Sir Bedivere =

Round Table-class landing ship logistics of the Royal Fleet Auxiliary and Brazilian Navy

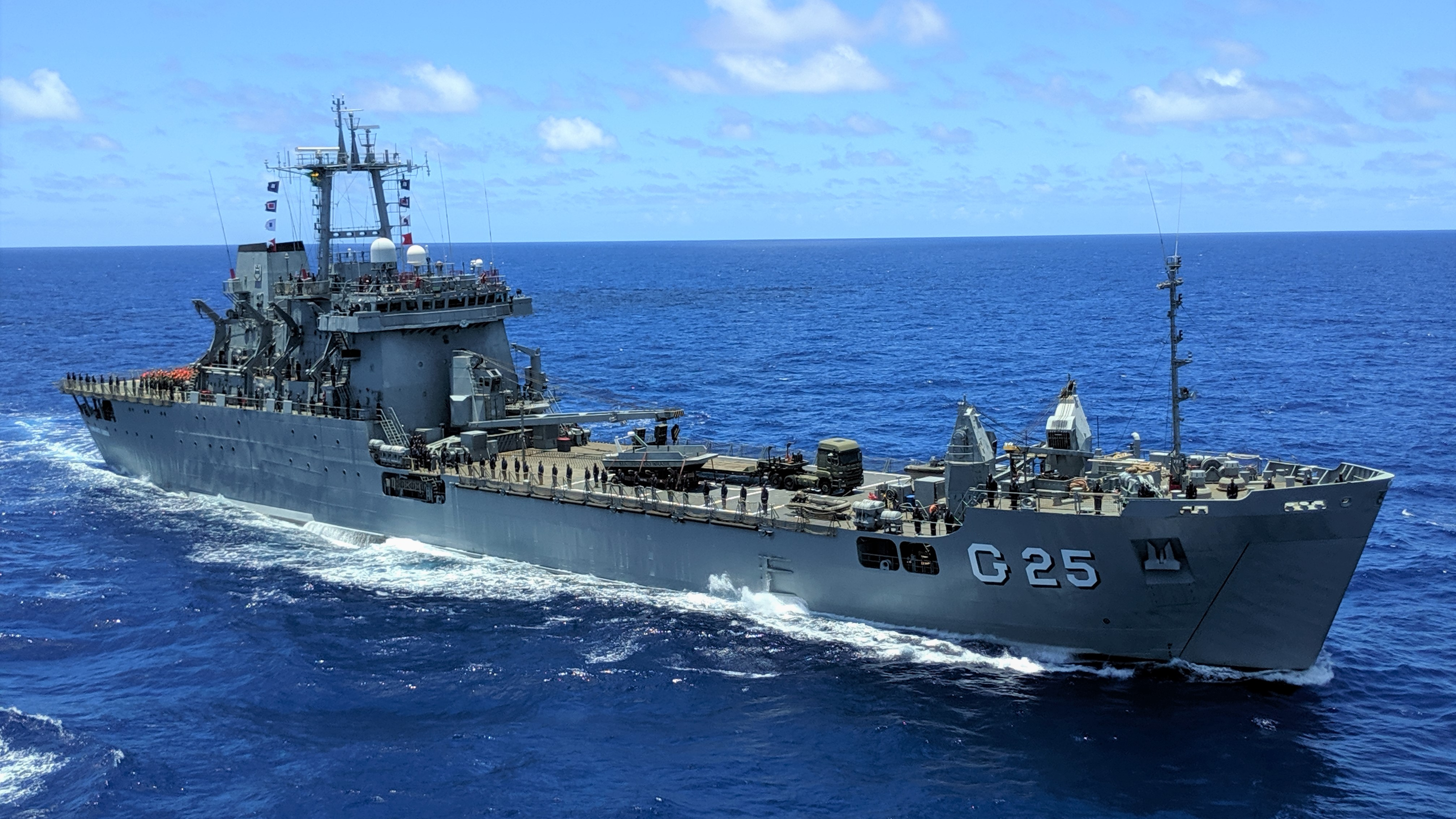

History

United Kingdom
- Name: RFA Sir Bedivere
- Namesake: Bedivere
- Builder: Hawthorn Leslie
- Laid down: 31 October 1965
- Launched: 20 July 1966
- Commissioned: 18 May 1967
- Decommissioned: 18 February 2008
- Home port: Marchwood, Hampshire
- Fate: Sold to Brazil

Brazil
- Name: NDCC Almirante Saboia
- Namesake: Henrique Sabóia
- Commissioned: 21 May 2009
- Identification: IMO number: 6617154; MMSI number: 710482000; Callsign: PWSB
- Motto: "Sua praia, nossa missão!" ("Your beach, our mission!")
- Nickname(s): "Hippo"
- Status: In service

General characteristics
- Class & type: Round Table-class landing ship logistics
- Displacement: 6,700 tonnes full load
- Length: 137 m (449 ft 6 in)
- Beam: 20 m (65 ft 7 in)
- Draught: 3.98 m (13 ft 1 in)
- Propulsion: 2 × Mirrless Blackstone diesels; 2 shafts
- Speed: 17 knots (31 km/h; 20 mph)
- Range: 8,000 nmi (15,000 km; 9,200 mi) at 15 kn (28 km/h; 17 mph)
- Complement: 49
- Armament: 4 × Oerlikon 20 mm guns; 4 × 7.62 mm machine guns
- Aviation facilities: helicopters on aft platform, no hangar

RFA Sir Bedivere (L3004) was a Landing Ship Logistic of the Round Table class. She saw service in the Falklands War, the Persian Gulf and Sierra Leone. In 2009, she was commissioned into the Brazilian Navy and renamed NDCC Almirante Saboia (G25), where she saw service in Haiti. As of March 2026, she is actively sailing in Brazilian service.

== Background ==
The ship was originally built for army service, and was taken over by the Royal Fleet Auxiliary in 1970. Round Table class ships were exclusively crewed by Hong Kong Chinese sailors from their introduction in 1963 until 1989, when Sir Lancelot was the last RFA to be crewed in this way.

She was commissioned in 1967 and saw extensive service in many of Britain's naval operations since. Her home port was Marchwood, Hampshire, which is a major military port.

== Operational history ==
=== Falklands War ===
Sir Bedivere first saw combat in the Falklands War of 1982, when along with all of the Royal Navy's other amphibious ships, she was sent to recapture the Falkland Islands from an Argentine occupation force. At the start of the war, the ship was at Vancouver, British Columbia, Canada, but started back to Marchwood immediately. After loading at Marchwood, she left for Ascension Island where she picked up the sappers of 11 Field Squadron Royal Engineers. The ship suffered slight damage on 24 May whilst lying in San Carlos Water, when an Argentine Skyhawk dropped a bomb that glanced off the ship. The sappers disembarked for Port San Carlos on the evening of 25 May.

On 16 November 1982, she returned from the Falklands with the bodies of 64 members of the British Forces (52 soldiers, 11 Royal Marines, and a Chinese laundryman) whose families had wanted their remains returned.

=== 1983-2007 ===
The ship deployed to the Persian Gulf in 1991 in support of Operation Granby.

In 1994, the ship was modernised in a service life extension programme to give it an extra 15 years. The ship was lengthened by 12 metres, had its superstructure altered to a more modern design, the engines were replaced, and the ship's bow thrusters were changed for more powerful models.

After returning to service in 1998, the ship was sent to Sierra Leone in 2000 when the U.K. intervened there. The ship operated as the command vessel for British and American mine countermeasures ships during Operation Telic in 2003.

Sir Bedivere left the U.K. in September 2002 for the Mediterranean and operation Argonaut in 2002.She was then diverted to the Persian Gulf accompanied by four British minesweepers. After minesweeping operations were complete, the vessel operated as a troop support ship for the Royal Marines. The ship returned to the U.K. on 29 May 2003, carrying the boats and men of 539 Assault Squadron Royal Marines.

In 2006, Sir Bedivere returned from Sierra Leone and its part in Operation Vela.

=== Decommissioning ===
Although originally intended to be used until 2011, Sir Bedivere was decommissioned on 18 February 2008.

=== Brazilian Navy ===
In December 2008, Sir Bedivere was sold to Brazil, joining her sister ship Sir Galahad. Sir Bedivere was handed over to the Brazilian Navy on 21 May 2009, after a major refit by A&P Group at the company's ship repair facility in Falmouth, Cornwall. She was commissioned into service with the Brazilian Navy, and renamed Navio de Desembarque de Carros de Combate (Landing Ship, Tank) NDCC Almirante Saboia (G-25), after Almirante de esquadra Henrique Sabóia, minister of the Navy from 1985 to 1990 under the José Sarney administration. Admiral Saboia's widow and other members of the family were present at the handover ceremony.

As Almirante Saboia, she undertook several voyages between Port-au-Prince and Rio de Janeiro in support of Brazilian Army and Marine Corps troops in United Nations service during MINUSTAH. On 12 January 2010, she joined the task force that took part in the Brazilian Navy's ASPIRANTEX yearly training exercise, which included the frigates Niterói, Constituição and Independência, the tanker Almirante Gastão Motta, as well as the submarines Tupi and Tikuna, sailing under the command of Contra-Almirante César Sidonio Daiha Moreira de Souza. During the course of ASPIRANTEX 2010, Almirante Saboia visited the ports of Salvador, Recife, Cabedelo and Natal. However, she was requisitioned after the earthquake, leaving Rio de Janeiro on 1 February with 700 tons of supplies, including both humanitarian aid as well as military supplies for the Brazilian MINUSTAH contingent. She arrived on 17 February, spending the next 30 days in the Caribbean country.

She later took part in the Haiti XIV commission between 21 May and 2 August 2012, carrying 260 tons of Marine Corps and Army supplies to MINUSTAH, and returning to Rio with roughly 300 tons of damaged vehicles and equipment for maintenance.

As of March 2026, she is actively sailing in Brazilian service.

== Gallery ==
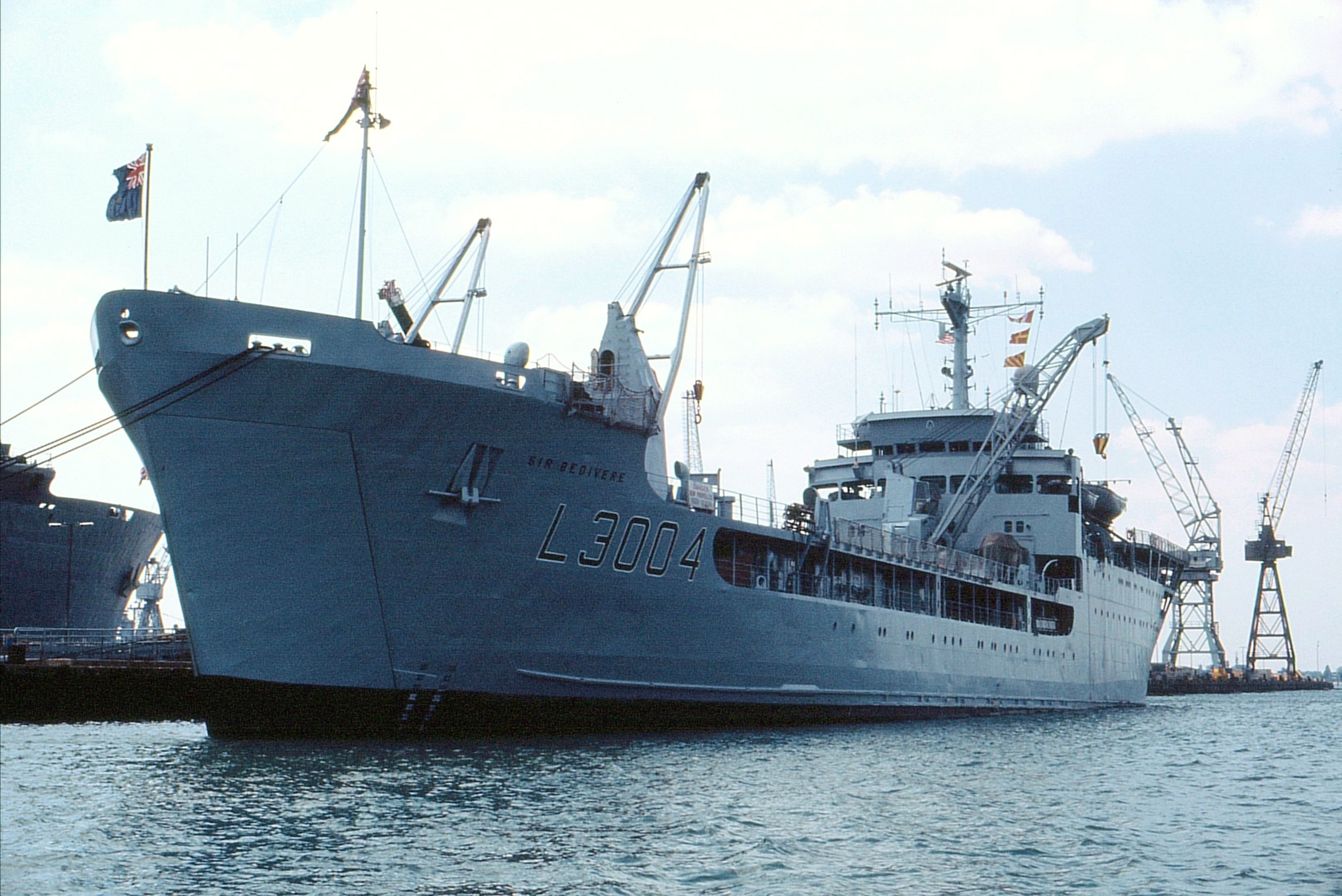
RFA Sir Bedivere in Portsmouth, 1989.

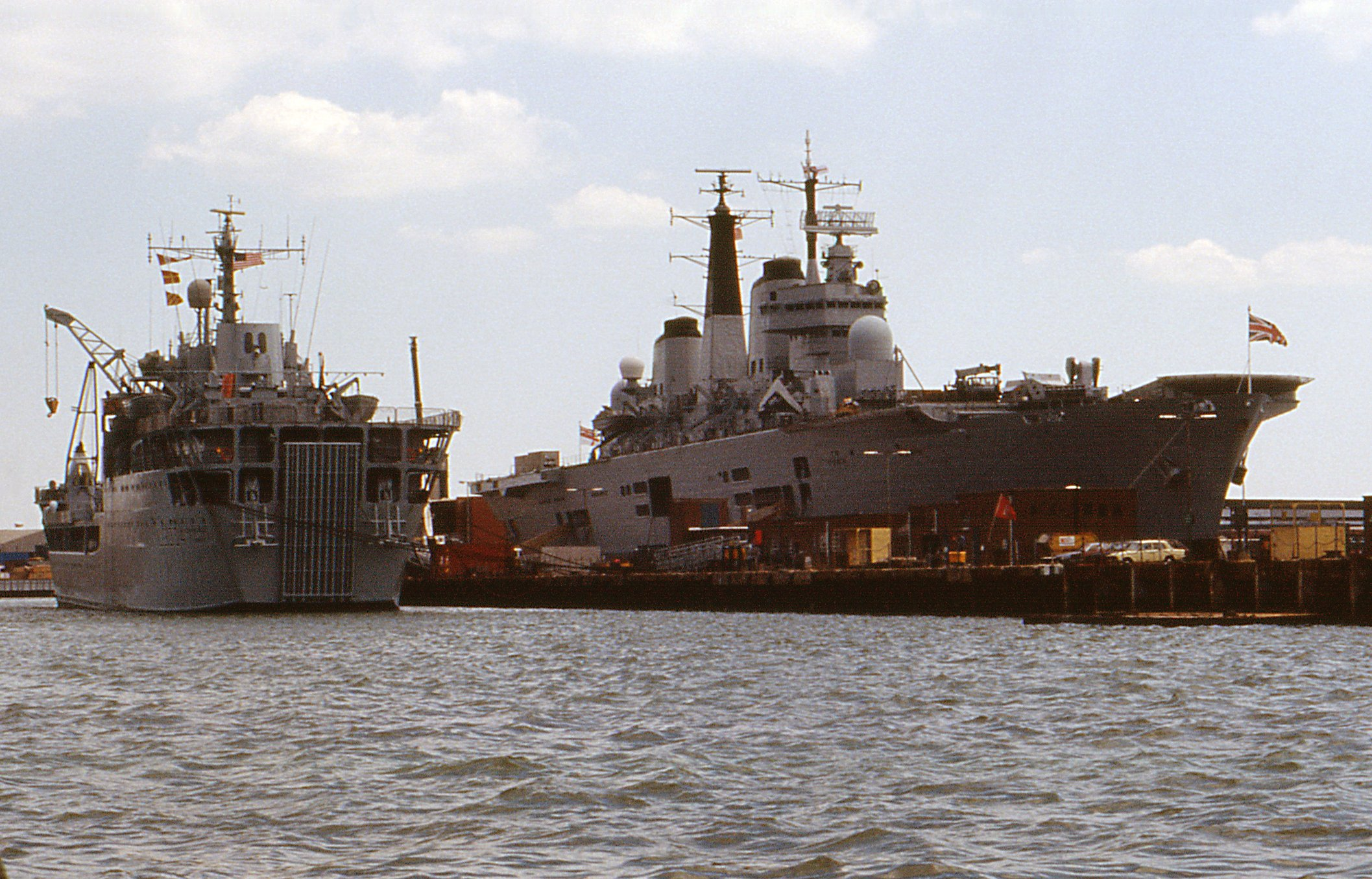
Sir Bedivere docked alongside a Royal Navy aircraft carrier in Portsmouth, 1989.

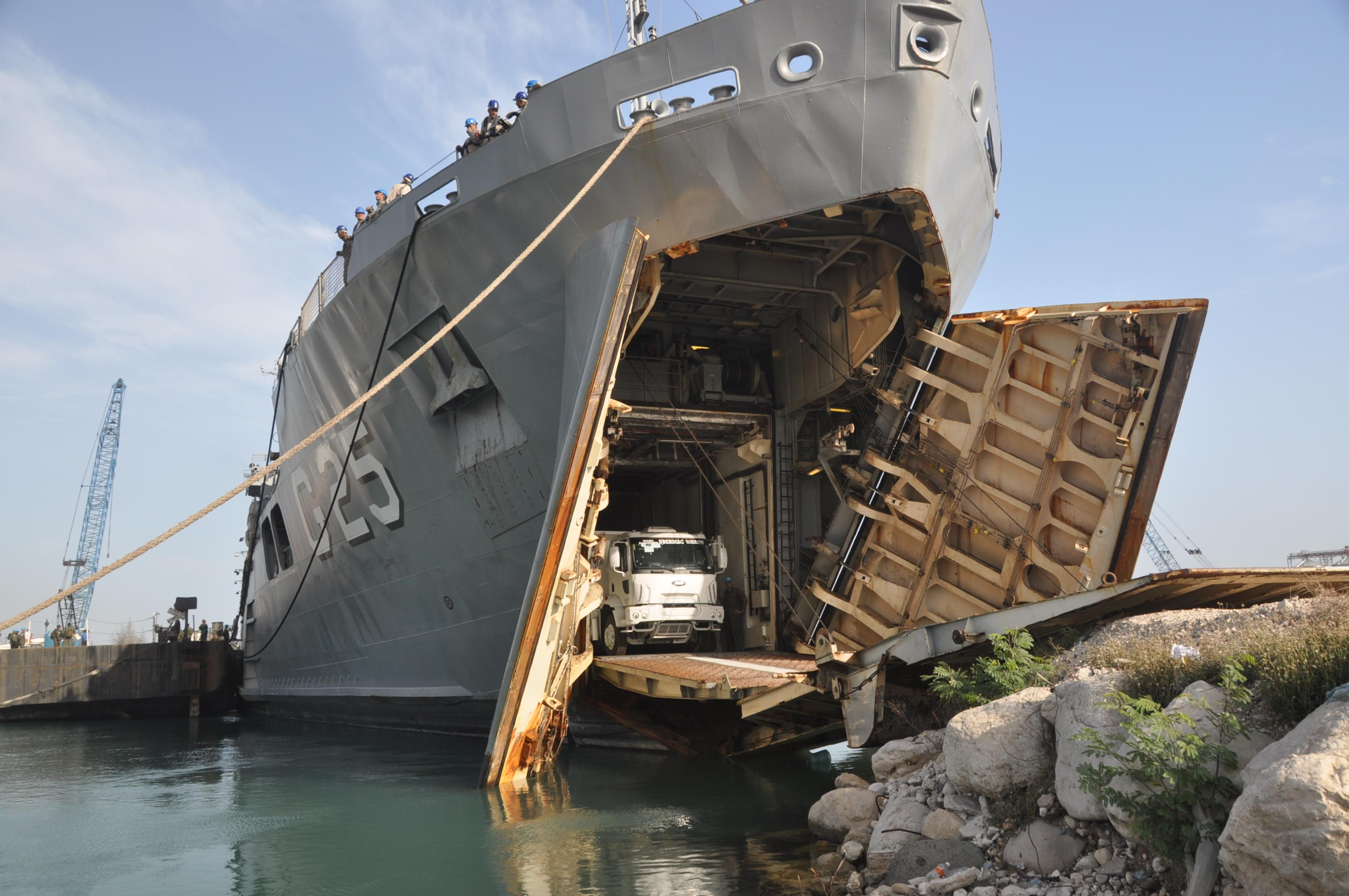
NDCC Almirante Saboia unloads UN equipment in Port-au-Prince.

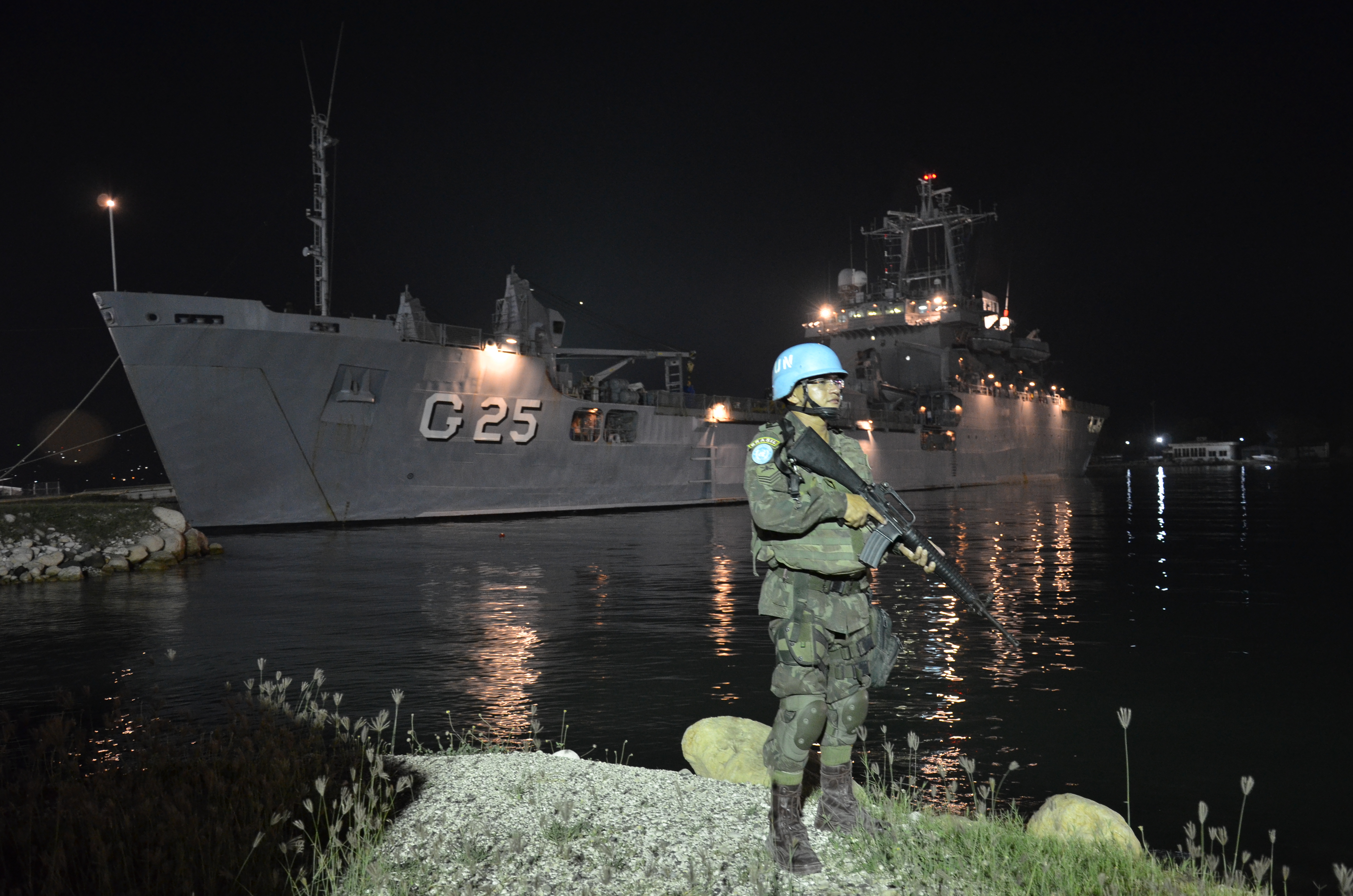
A Brazilian Marine stands guard as NDCC Almirante Saboia docks in Port-au-Prince, 2013.

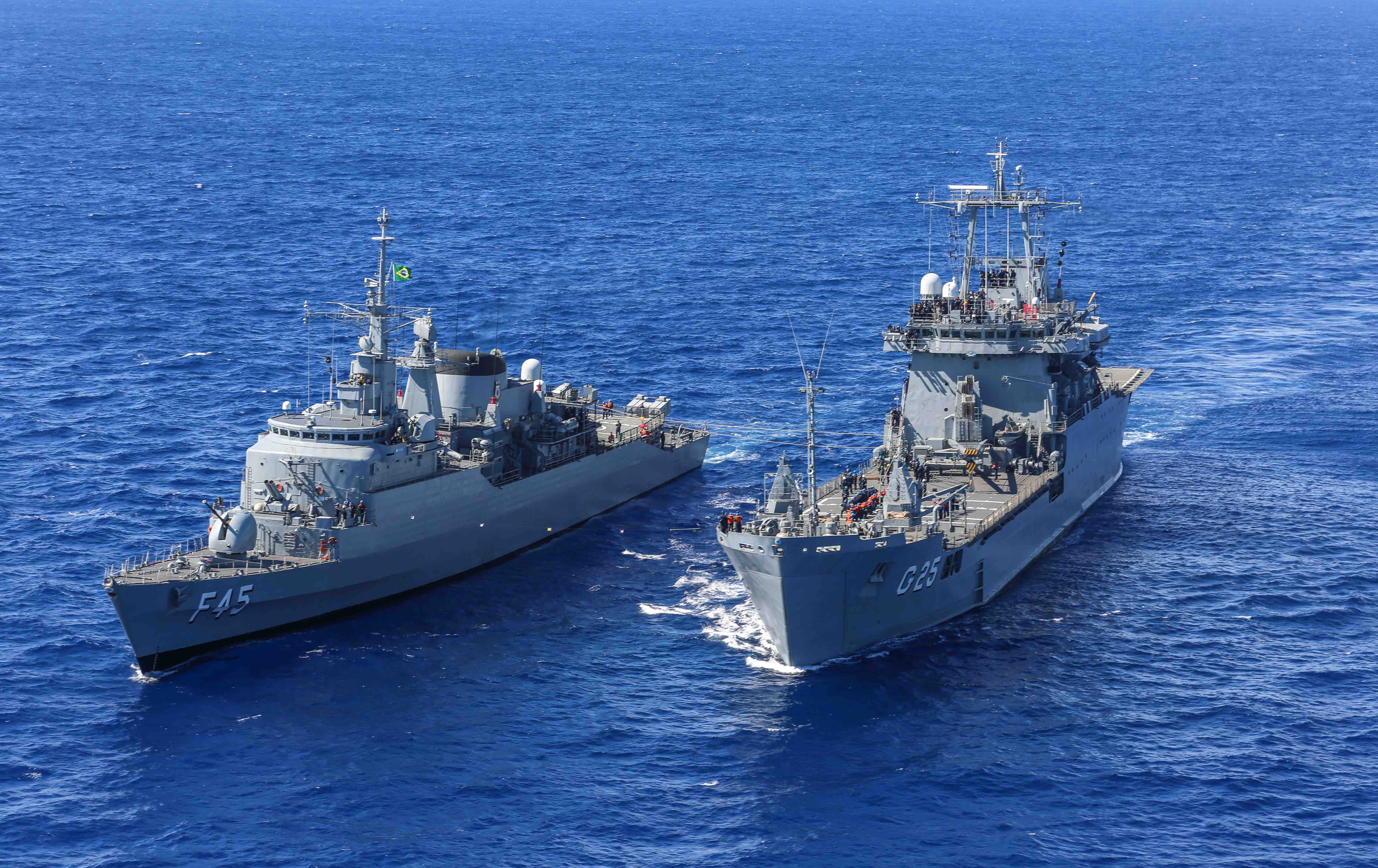
Almirante Saboia sails alongside União during naval exercises, 2018.
