= Round Table-class landing ship logistics =

1962 class of British landing ships

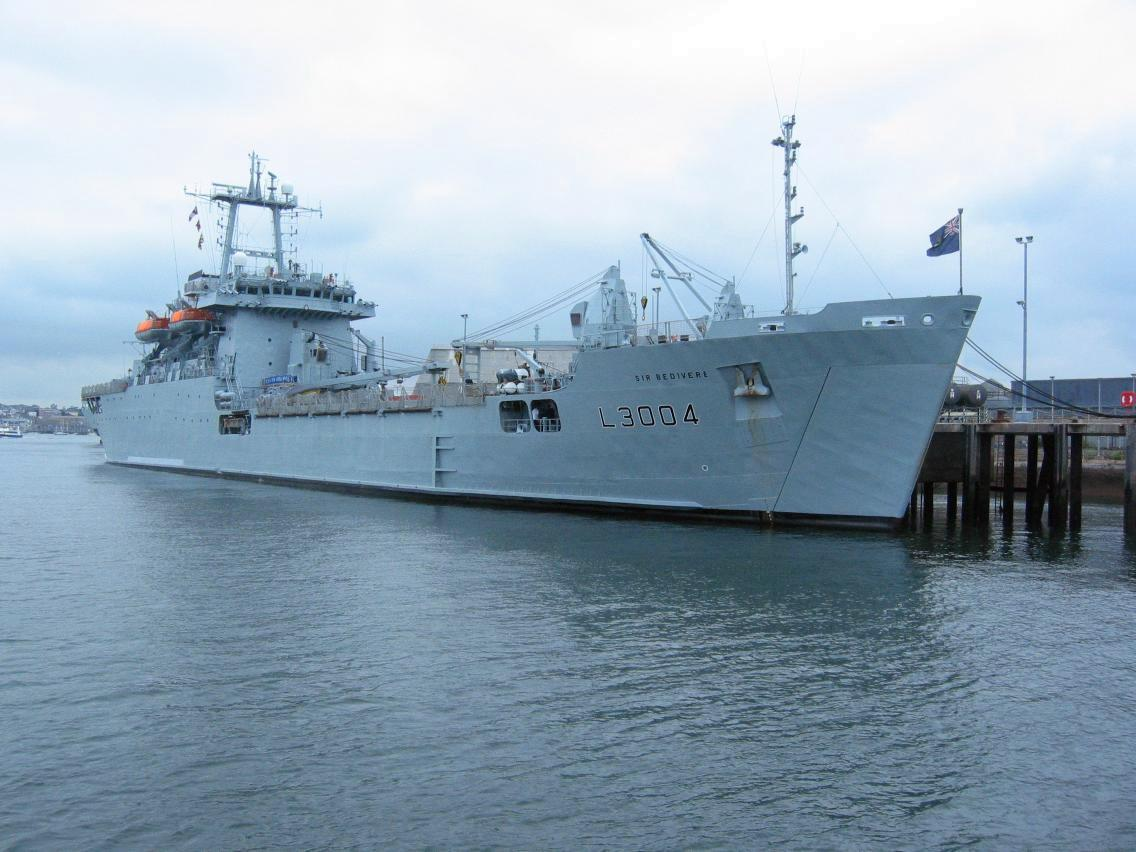
- RFA Sir Bedivere

Class overview
- Name: Round Table-class landing ship logistics
- Builders: Fairfields; Stephens; Hawthorn Leslie; Swan Hunter
- Operators: Royal Navy; Royal Australian Navy; Brazilian Navy; Republic of Singapore Navy
- Preceded by: Mark 8 Landing Craft Tank
- Succeeded by: Bay-class landing ship
- Built: 1962-1967; 1985-1986
- In commission: 1964-present
- Completed: 7
- Active: 1
- Lost: 1

General characteristics
- Type: Landing ship logistics
- Displacement: 3,270 tons standard; 5,674 tons fully loaded
- Length: 413 ft (126 m)
- Beam: 59 ft (18 m)
- Draught: 13 ft (4.0 m)
- Propulsion: 2 × diesel engines, 9,400 bhp (7,010 kW), 2 shafts
- Speed: 17.25 knots (31.95 km/h; 19.85 mph)
- Capacity: Tank deck: 12 Challenger tanks, 31 large vehicles, 56 Land Rovers or 26 cargo containers; Vehicle deck: 19 large vehicles, 50 Land Rovers or 20 containers
- Troops: 402
- Complement: 65
- Armament: 2 × 20 mm guns
- Aviation facilities: Helicopter deck aft

The Round Table class, also known as the Sir Lancelot class, was a British ship class designed for amphibious warfare missions in support of the main amphibious warfare ships. They were designated landing ship logistics (LSL).

All ships were named after Knights of the Round Table.

== Class history ==
In December 1961, the Ministry of Transport ordered the first in a new class of 6,000-ton military supply vessels from Fairfield Shipbuilding and Engineering Company of Govan. The class was designed to replace the World War II-era Mark 8 Landing Craft Tank vessels in service. The first ship, Sir Lancelot, was launched in June 1963. In March 1963, two more vessels were ordered, with Sir Galahad and Sir Geraint launched by Alexander Stephen and Sons of Linthouse in April 1966 and January 1967. The final three ships were ordered in April 1965; Sir Bedivere and Sir Tristram were launched by Hawthorn Leslie and Company of Hebburn in July and December 1966, followed by Sir Percivale from Swan Hunter of Wallsend in October 1967. At 6,390 GRT, Sir Lancelot was slightly larger than her successors, and was powered by two 12-cylinder Sulzer diesel engines, while the others were 4,473 GRT and had two 10-cylinder Mirrlees Monarch engines.

The ships had both bow and stern doors leading onto the main vehicle deck, making them roll-on/roll-off, combined with ramps that led to upper and lower vehicle decks. Thanks to their shallow draught, they could beach themselves and use the bow doors for speedy unloading of troops and equipment. The ships also had helicopter decks on both the upper vehicle deck and behind the superstructure.

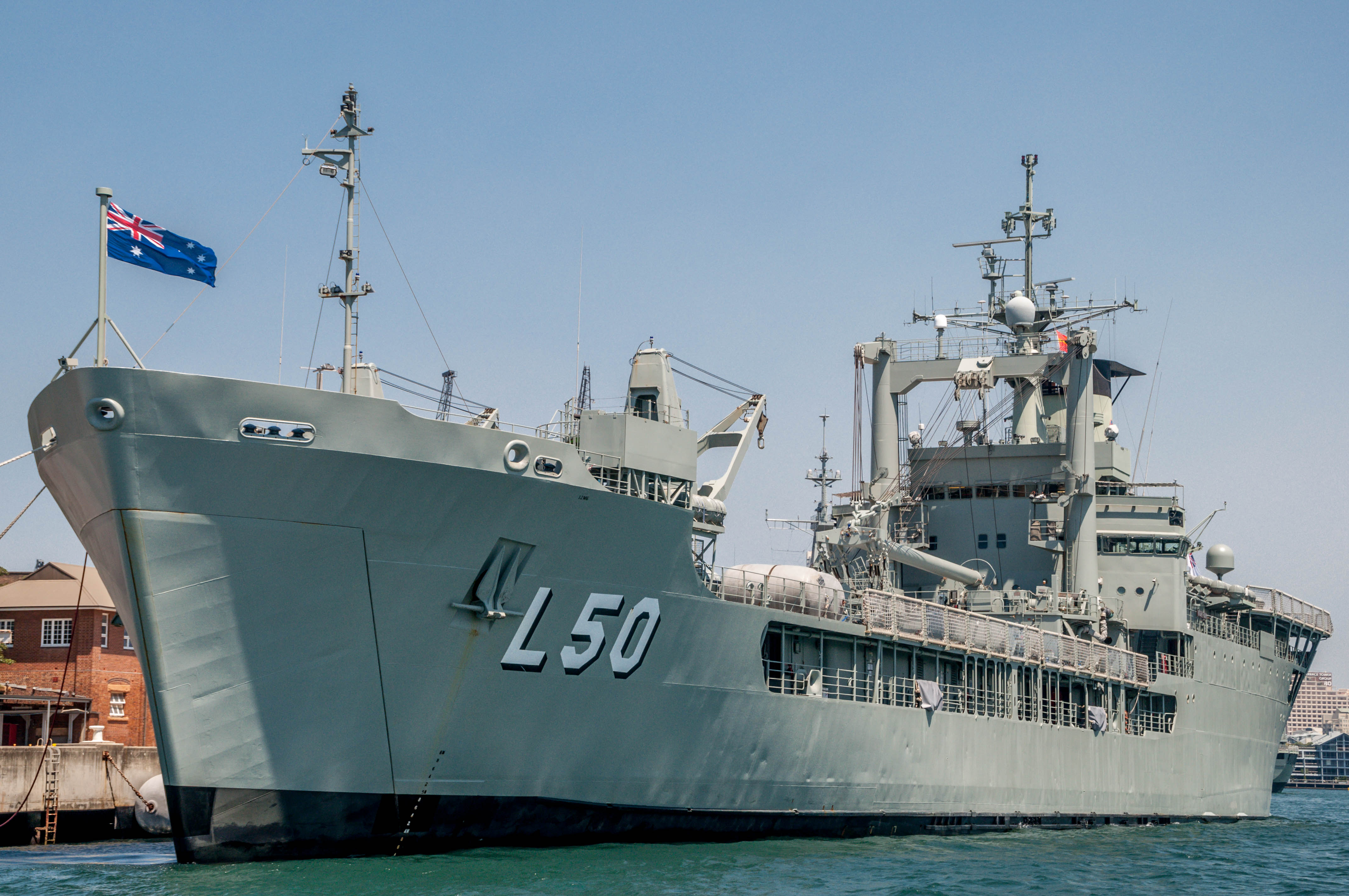
The Australian Landing Ship Heavy HMAS Tobruk was a modified derivative of the Round Table class design.

The ships were operated and managed by the British India Steam Navigation Company for the Royal Army Service Corps until January 1970, then were transferred to the Royal Fleet Auxiliary. One vessel, Sir Galahad, was lost during the Falklands War, while another, Sir Tristram, was badly damaged. The former was replaced by a new, 8,861 GT vessel of the same name, while the latter was rebuilt and returned to service. All of the vessels in this class were replaced by the Bay class, with Sir Bedivere the last to leave service in 2008.

HMAS Tobruk, formerly operated by the Royal Australian Navy, was based on the Round Table design.

== Ships ==
Name	Pennant Number	Builder	Laid down	Launched	Commissioned	Fate
Royal Fleet Auxiliary
Original Design
Sir Bedivere	L3004	Hawthorn Leslie, Hebburn	28 October 1965	20 July 1966	18 May 1967	Sold to Brazilian Navy as Almirante Saboia, 2008
Sir Galahad (I)	L3005	Alexander Stephen and Sons, Govan	22 February 1965	19 April 1966	17 December 1966	Sunk following air attack, 21 June 1982
Sir Geraint	L3027	Alexander Stephen and Sons, Govan	21 February 1965	26 January 1967	12 July 1967	Broken up at Gadani, 2005
Sir Lancelot	L3029	Fairfields, Govan	March 1962	25 June 1963	16 January 1964	Sold into mercantile service, 1989 and broken up 2008
Sir Percivale	L3036	Swan Hunter, Wallsend	27 July 1966	4 October 1967	23 March 1968	Broken up at Liverpool, 2010
Sir Tristram	L3505	Hawthorn Leslie, Hebburn	14 March 1966	12 December 1966	14 September 1967	Moored at Portland as static training ship
Modified Design
Sir Galahad (II)	L3005	Swan Hunter, Wallsend	12 May 1985	13 December 1986	25 November 1987	Sold to Brazilian Navy as Garcia D'Avila, 2007. Retired in 2019.
Royal Australian Navy
Tobruk	L 50	Carrington Slipways, Tomago	7 February 1978	1 March 1980	23 April 1981	Sunk as artificial reef, June 2018

== See also ==
- List of amphibious warfare ships of the Royal Fleet Auxiliary

Equivalent landing ships of the same era

- De Soto County class
