= RFA Sir Galahad (1966) =

1966 Round Table class landing ship logistics vessel

Coordinates: 51.841°S 58.211°W

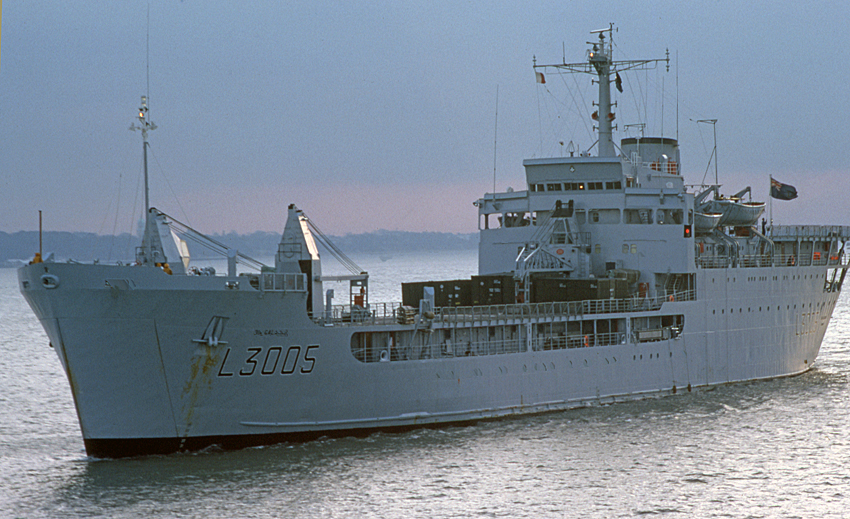
- RFA Sir Galahad in 1979

History

United Kingdom
- Name: Sir Galahad
- Namesake: Galahad
- Builder: Alexander Stephen and Sons
- Laid down: February 1965
- Launched: 19 April 1966
- Commissioned: 17 December 1966
- Identification: IMO number: 6615508
- Fate: Damaged 8 June 1982, during Falklands War; Scuttled 21 June 1982

General characteristics
- Class & type: Round Table-class landing ship logistics
- Tonnage: 6,390 GRT; 2,215 DWT
- Displacement: 3,322 t (3,270 long tons) standard; 5,765 t (5,674 long tons) fully loaded
- Length: 412 ft (126 m)
- Beam: 60 ft (18 m)
- Draught: 13 ft (4.0 m)
- Propulsion: 2 Mirrlees National ALSSDM10 diesel engines.; Power: 9,400 bhp (7,010 kW)
- Speed: 17 knots (31 km/h; 20 mph)
- Range: 9,200 nmi (17,000 km; 10,600 mi) at 15 knots (28 km/h; 17 mph)
- Capacity: 2,443 tonnes
- Complement: 68 crew, up to 534 passengers
- Armament: Two 40 mm Bofors AA guns.
- Aircraft carried: Up to 20 Wessex helicopters (1973)

RFA Sir Galahad (L3005) was a Round Table-class landing ship logistics vessel belonging to the Royal Fleet Auxiliary (RFA) of the United Kingdom. The ship saw service in the Falklands War of 1982, where she was bombed and set afire at Fitzroy on 8 June.

== Background ==
She was first managed for the British Army by the British-India Steam Navigation Company, before being transferred in 1970 to the RFA, and was crewed by British officers and Hong Kong Chinese civilian crew.

== Design and construction ==
Sir Galahad was a 3,322-tonne LSL built by Stephens and launched in 1966. She could carry 340 troops or, when necessary, 534 for short periods. Cargo capacity could include 16 light tanks, 34 mixed vehicles, 122 tonnes of fuel and 31 tonnes of ammunition. Landing craft could be carried in place of lifeboats, but unloading was mainly handled by three onboard cranes.

== Operational history ==
=== 1970 ===
In November and December 1970 Sir Galahad was involved in Operation Burlap giving humanitarian assistance to East Pakistan after a cyclone caused extensive damage and flooding.

=== Falklands War and loss ===
Sir Galahad was a part of the British task force during the Falklands War, sailing from HMNB Devonport on 6 April 1982, with 350 Royal Marines. The vessel entered San Carlos Water, East Falkland, on 21 May. Three days later, on 24 May, Sir Galahad was attacked by a formation of strike aircraft – McDonnell Douglas A-4 Skyhawks and IAI Daggers – of the Argentine Air Force's IV Brigada Aérea. A Skyhawk dropped a British-pattern 1,000 lb (450 kg) bomb that lodged inside the ship, but did not detonate. The ship was also hit by cannon fire from the Daggers.

The bomb, which was found to be live, was removed from the ship by members of the navy's Fleet Clearance Diving Team 3 (FCDT3). Having used a crane to remove the bomb from its position in the battery charging room, FCDT3 took the bomb in a Gemini dinghy before disposing of the bomb in waters away from all shipping.

On 8 June, while preparing to unload soldiers from the Welsh Guards, in Port Pleasant, Fitzroy, together with RFA Sir Tristram, Sir Galahad was attacked by three Skyhawks from the Argentine V Brigada Aérea, each carrying three US-pattern Mark 82 500 lb (230 kg) bombs, with retarding tails. At approximately 14:00 local time, Sir Galahad was hit by two or three bombs, which exploded and started fires. The explosions and subsequent fire caused the deaths of 48 crew and soldiers.

Following the air attack, the fires quickly began to burn out of control. The main evacuation of the injured and wounded was organised and carried out by the ship's Royal Marine detachment. The Marines organised the launch of life rafts from the bow of the ship, whilst at the same time marshaling helicopters for personnel to be winched clear. Immediate first aid was given to those most seriously wounded and a triage system set up. BBC television cameras recorded images of Royal Navy helicopters hovering in thick smoke to winch survivors from the burning landing ships.

Other units affected included 3 Troop—of 20 Field Squadron, 36 Engineer Regiment—which was temporarily attached to 9 Independent Parachute Squadron and was being transported on Sir Galahad to provide engineering support following the landings. Engineers feature prominently in contemporary footage showing two lifeboats landing survivors. Also on board were 16 Field Ambulance, who assisted with the treatment and evacuation of the many casualties.

Chiu Yiu-Nam, a seaman on Sir Galahad, was later awarded the George Medal for rescuing ten men trapped by a fire in the bowels of the ship. The captain, Philip Roberts, was reportedly the last to leave Sir Galahad, and was subsequently awarded the Distinguished Service Order for his leadership and courage. Royal Marine Sergeant Brian Dolivera was mentioned in dispatches, related to his work on the evacuation.

=== After the Falklands War ===
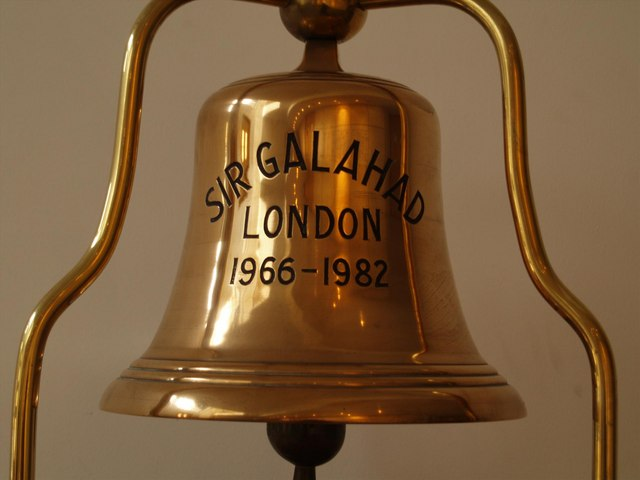
Sir Galahad's bell in The Falkland Islands Memorial Chapel, Pangbourne, Berks

On 21 June, the hulk was towed out to sea by the tugboat Typhoon and sunk by HMS Onyx using torpedoes; it is now a protected war grave under the Protection of Military Remains Act.

Guardsman Simon Weston was among the survivors of the attack on Sir Galahad. He suffered 46% burns and his story has been widely reported in television and newspaper coverage. Ten years after Sir Galahad was sunk, Weston was awarded the OBE. Other survivors included the intelligence consultant Crispin Black.

A Tyne-class lifeboat RFA Sir Galahad (47-010) entered service with the Royal National Lifeboat Institution in 1986, named in honor of (L3005).

A replacement ship entered service in 1988, carrying the same name and pennant number.
