= RFA Sir Geraint =

1967 Round Table-class landing ship logistics of the Royal Fleet Auxiliary

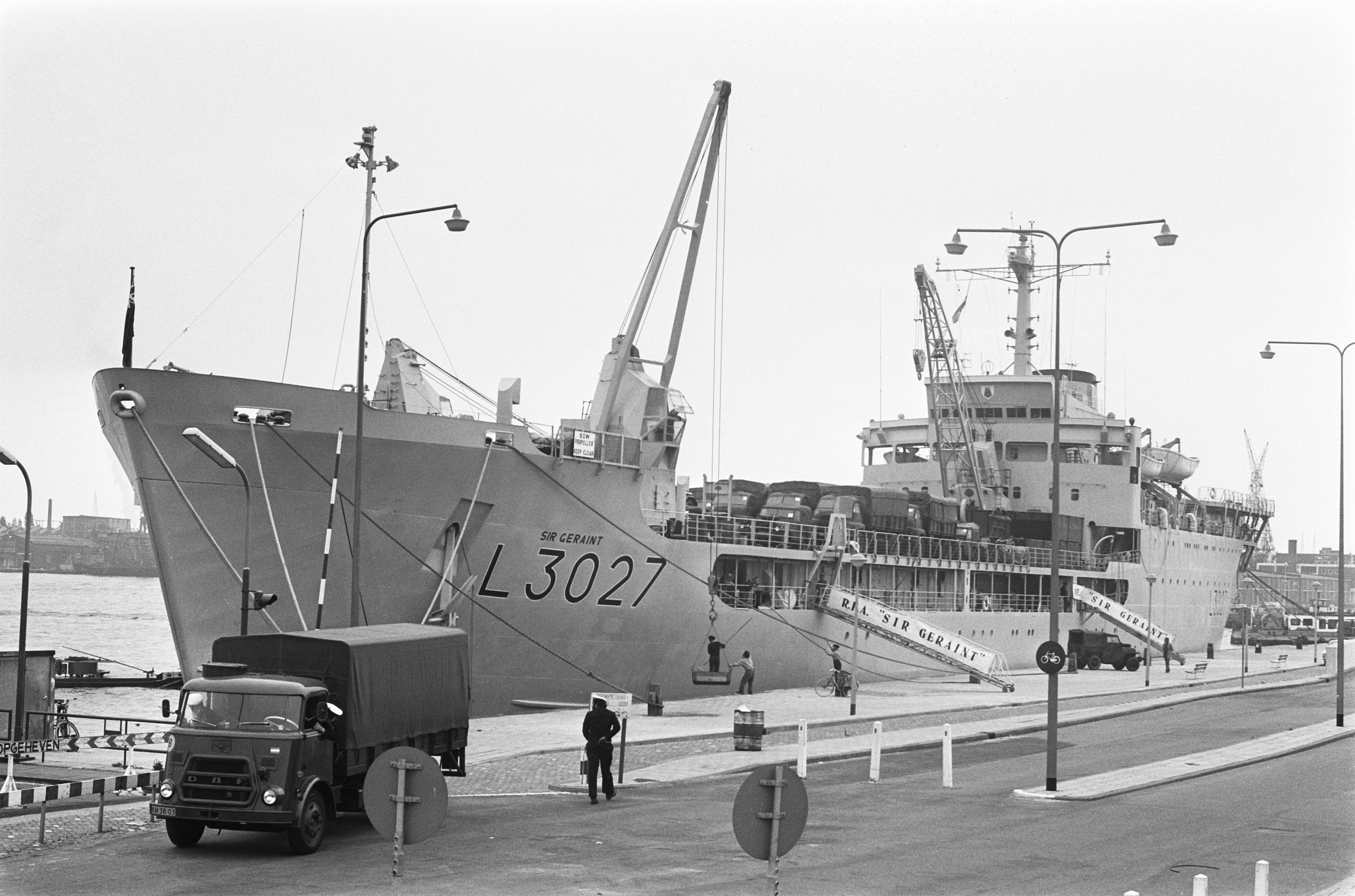

History

United Kingdom
- Namesake: Geraint
- Ordered: April 1964
- Builder: Alexander Stephen and Sons
- Laid down: June 1965
- Launched: 26 January 1967
- Commissioned: 12 July 1967
- Decommissioned: 1 May 2003
- Identification: IMO number: 6707894
- Fate: Sold commercially and renamed Sir G in July 2005. Scrapped in India in December 2005

General characteristics
- Class & type: Round Table class LSL
- Displacement: 3,270 tons standard; 5,674 tons fully loaded
- Length: 412 ft (126 m)
- Beam: 60 ft (18 m)
- Draught: 13 ft (4.0 m)
- Propulsion: 2 Mirrlees National ALSSDM10 diesels.; Power: 9,400 bhp (7,010 kW)
- Speed: 17 knots
- Range: 9,200 miles at 15 knots
- Capacity: 2,404 tons
- Complement: 68 crew, up to 340 passengers
- Armament: Two 40 mm Bofors AA guns.
- Aircraft carried: Up to 20 Wessex helicopters (1973)

RFA Sir Geraint (L3027) was a Landing Ship Logistic of the Round Table class. She saw service in the Falklands War and Sierra Leone.

== Background ==
The ship was originally built for army service, and was taken over by the Royal Fleet Auxiliary in 1970. Round Table class ships were exclusively crewed by Hong Kong Chinese sailors from their introduction in 1963 until 1989, when Sir Lancelot was the last RFA to be crewed in this way. Like all of her class, Sir Geraint was named after a Knight of the Round Table.

She was commissioned in 1967 and saw extensive service in many of Britain's naval operations since. Her home port was Marchwood.

== Operational history ==
=== Falklands War ===
Sir Geraint first saw combat in the Falklands War of 1982, when along with all of the Royal Navy's other amphibious ships, she was sent to recapture the Falkland Islands from an Argentine occupation force. At the start of the war, the ship was at Devonport and after the embarkation of 450 Royal Marines and 3 Gazelle helicopters, she left for Ascension Island. The ship anchored in San Carlos Water, Fitzroy Sound and Teal Inlet, discharging fuel and cargo.

=== 1978-2003 ===
In Operation Palliser, the ship was sent to Sierra Leone in 2000 when the U.K. intervened there. 11 September 1978 the Sir Geraint sailed from Alexandra dock, Liverpool en route to Belfast, carrying 13 platoon, Somme company, 1st Battalion Kings Own Royal Border Regiment; a detachment from the RAF and another detachment (unit not disclosed).

== Decommissioning ==
Sir Geraint was listed for disposal in May 2003 and was reported broken up in India on 12 December 2005.
