= Mark 8 Landing Craft Tank =

1945 class of British landing craft tank ships

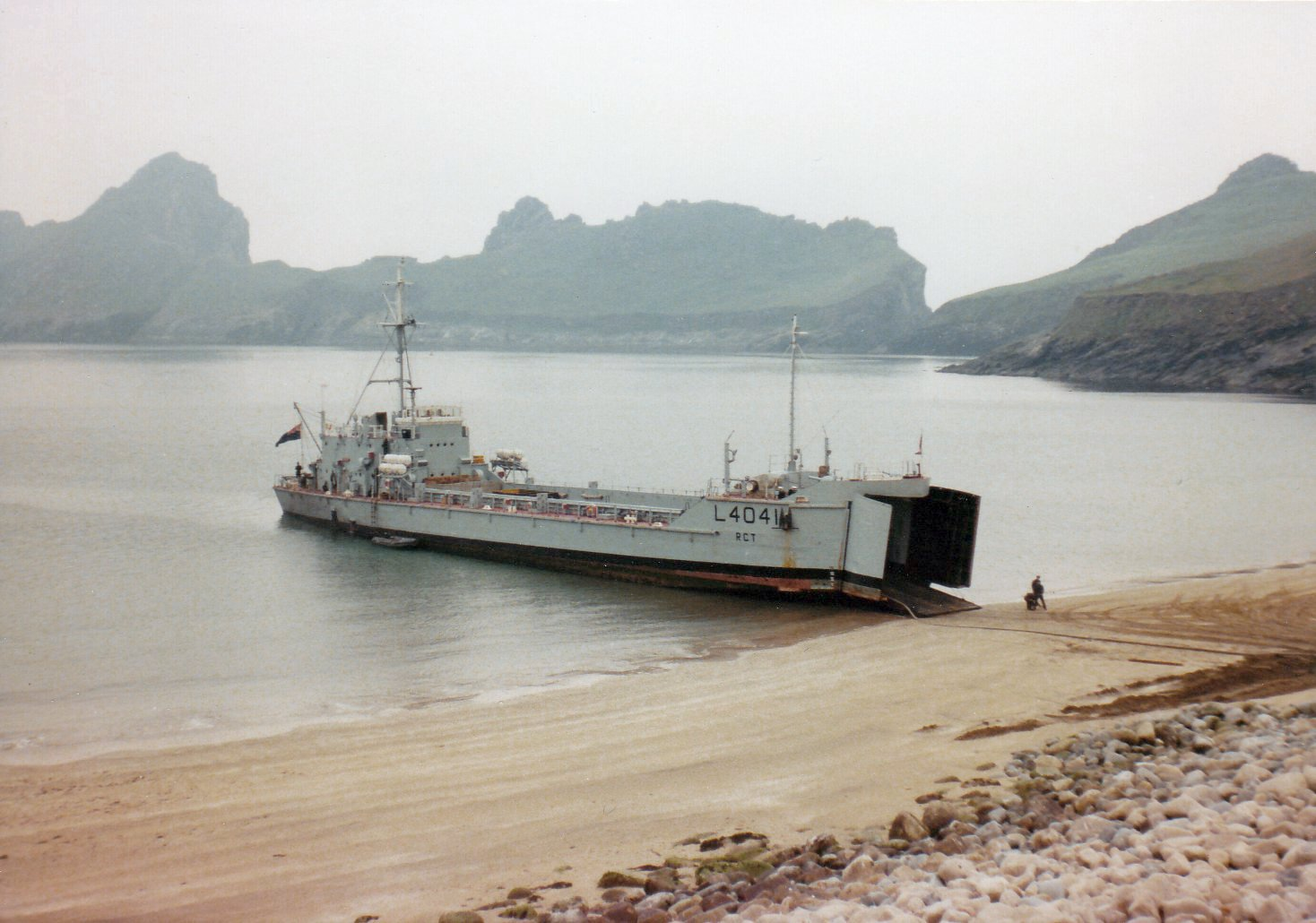
- HMAV Abbeville beached in Village Bay, St Kilda, Scotland.

Class overview
- Name: Mark 8 Landing Craft Tank
- Builders: See Construction
- Operators: Royal Navy; British Army; Royal Malaysian Navy; French Navy; Singaporean Navy; Military of Comoros
- Planned: 187
- Completed: 30 for military service
- Canceled: 151 (6 completed and sold into civilian service)

General characteristics
- Type: Landing craft tank
- Displacement: 1,017 tons maximum
- Length: 225 ft (69 m) between perpendiculars; 231.2 ft (70.5 m) overall
- Beam: 38 ft (12 m)
- Draught: 4 feet 8 inches (1.42 m) forward, 5 feet 2 inches (1.57 m) aft at 880 tons displacement
- Propulsion: 4 × Davey Paxman 12TPM engines; 1,600 brake horsepower (1,200 kW) (capped maximum); 2 shafts
- Speed: 8 knots (15 km/h; 9.2 mph) cruising; 12.5 knots (23.2 km/h; 14.4 mph) maximum
- Range: 4,000 nautical miles (7,400 km; 4,600 mi) at 8 knots (15 km/h; 9.2 mph); 2,500 nautical miles (4,600 km; 2,900 mi) at 10 knots (19 km/h; 12 mph)
- Capacity: 8 x 30-ton tanks, 13 x 3-ton trucks, or 350 tons of cargo
- Troops: 42 (vehicle crews)
- Complement: 25 (designed); 33 to 37 (as of 1968)
- Armament: 4 x 20 mm Oerlikons

The Mark 8 Landing Craft Tank (also referred to as the LCT (8) or LCT Mark VIII) were landing craft tank ships operated by the British Armed Forces. The vessels were based on an American design, but improved into ocean-going vessels capable of sailing to and operating in the Far East.

Although 187 vessels were ordered, the end of the Second World War meant that only 30 were completed for service in the Royal Navy, while another 6 were sold to civilian parties. Twelve of the Royal Navy vessels were, from 1957, transferred to the British Army; these were initially operated by the Royal Army Service Corps, which then became the Royal Corps of Transport. Between 1958 and 1966, the other 18 Royal Navy ships were transferred or sold to foreign navies or civilian companies, converted for other uses, or otherwise disposed of. Several Army Mark 8s were also sold to foreign powers, with the design operated by the Royal Malaysian Navy, the French Navy, the Singaporean Navy, and the Military of Comoros.

During their service life, vessels of the class operated during the Suez Crisis and Indonesian Confrontation, and were involved in the setup and supply to guided weapons bases in the Hebrides as part of Operation Hardrock, primarily ferrying equipment from Cairnryan, near Stranraer, to the remote island of St. Kilda.

Eventually, they were replaced by Round Table class ships.

== Design ==
In October 1943, the Director of Naval Construction was instructed to prepare plans for a class of Landing Craft Tank vessels suitable for travelling to and operating in the Far East. They had to be capable of ocean operations and able to keep up with Landing Ship, Infantry convoys. Greater ranges and more lengthy periods of sustained operation than in the European or Mediterranean theatres would require a larger vessel with better seakeeping ability. Design and capabilities were heavily influenced by the United States' Mark 7 LCT (which was later re-categorised as Landing Ship Medium), which was capable of transporting multiple tanks over large distances. The Mark 8 was a synthesis of the best qualities of previous amphibious warfare vessels: the design was based on an enlarged version of the Mark 4 LCT, incorporating its light construction and suitability for mass-production, while including the robustness of the Mark 3 design, and adopting the bow layout and other elements from the Mark 2 Landing Ship Tank.

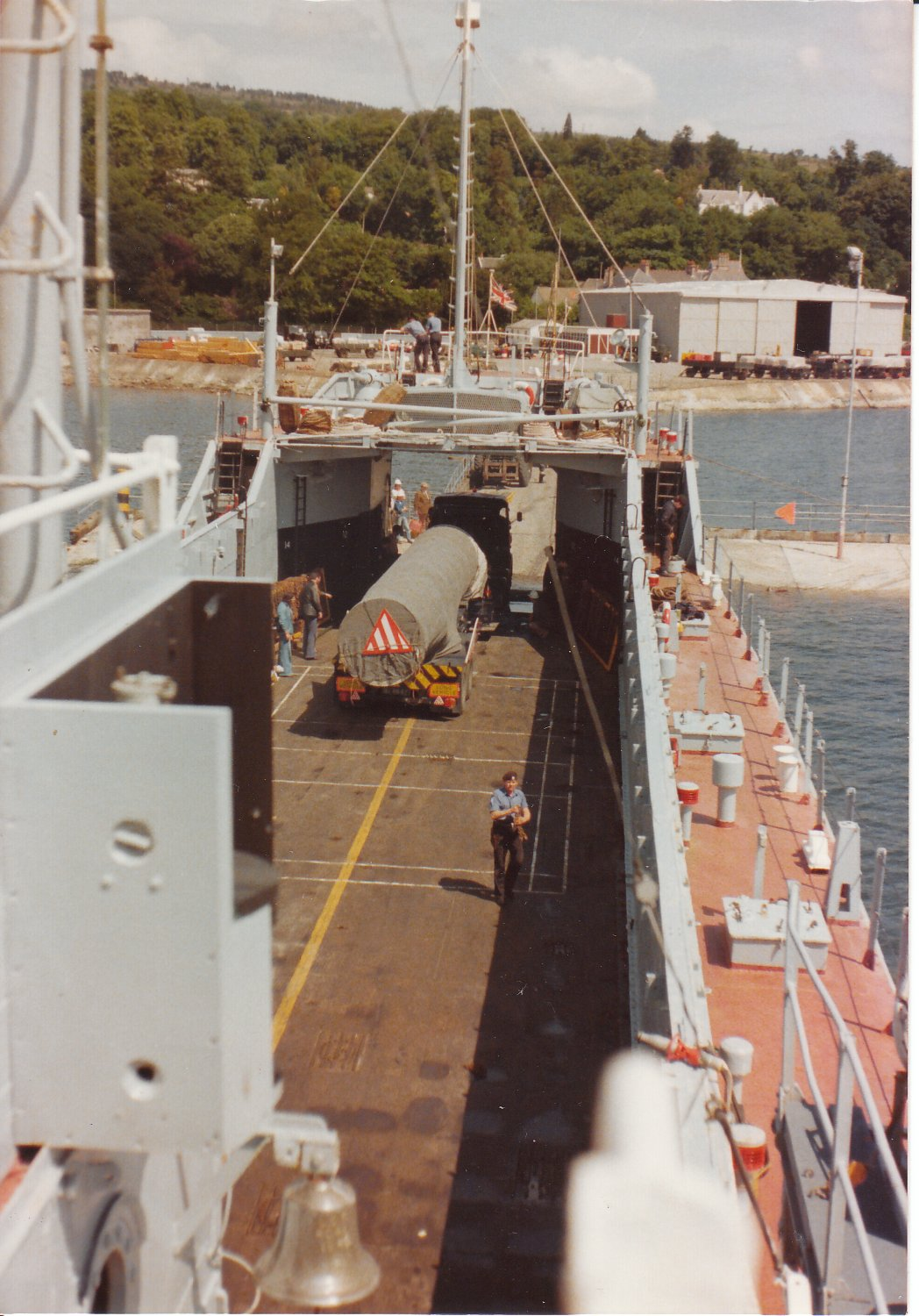
A Polaris missile being unloaded from the tank deck of HMAV Abbeville in 1977

The vessels were 225 feet (69 m) long between perpendiculars and 231.2 feet (70.5 m) long overall, with a beam of 38 feet (12 m). Although retaining the open tank deck of previous LCT designs, the Mark 8 was protected by a taller bow section, which was fitted with powered doors and ramp. The capacity was eight 30-ton tanks, up to 13 fully loaded 3-ton trucks, or 350 tons of cargo. Maximum displacement and draught varied depending on the loadout: trucks would result in a 650-ton displacement, 3-foot (0.91 m) draught at the bow, and 4-foot-8-inch (1.42 m) draught at the stern; for tanks, it was 780 tons, 3 feet 9 inches (1.14 m) forward, and 5 feet (1.5 m) aft; while a full load of cargo resulted in a displacement of 880 tons, and draughts of 4 feet 8 inches (1.42 m) and 5 feet 2 inches (1.57 m). Maximum displacement was 1,017 tons. The deeper draughts compared to previous vessels helped improve seakeeping.

An enlarged engine room compared to previous designs allowed the installation of four 460 shaft horsepower (340 kW), 12-cylinder Davey Paxman 12TPM diesel engines, coupled in two tandem sets to drive the two propeller shafts. These had a maximum combined output of 1,840 brake horsepower (1,370 kW) (roughly doubling that of previous LCTs), although output was capped at 1,600 brake horsepower (1,200 kW). Cruising speed was 8 knots (15 km/h; 9.2 mph), with a maximum speed of 12.5 knots (23.2 km/h; 14.4 mph). The landing craft could travel 4,000 nautical miles (7,400 km; 4,600 mi) at cruising speed, or 2,500 nautical miles (4,600 km; 2,900 mi) at 10 knots (19 km/h; 12 mph).

The expanded engine room required a lengthening of the poop deck, which allowed for improved accommodation spaces and an enlarged superstructure. During design, the vessel's complement was pegged at 25 (including three officers), but by the late 1960s, this had expanded to between 33 and 37. Additional accommodation was provided for up to 42 personnel (including six officers): typically the crews of any vehicles being transported. For defence, the vessels were fitted with four single 20 mm Oerlikon guns. There were also plans to fit some of the vessels with a Hedgerow: a modified Hedgehog anti-submarine mortar which would be fired to clear mines and obstructions from beaches prior to the landing of troops. The bridge, wireless telegraphy office, and gun platforms were armoured with 0.25-inch (6.4 mm), 15-pound (6.8 kg) D1 HT plating.

== Construction ==
187 vessels were ordered. They were identified with the pennant numbers L4001 through to L4187. 96 were ordered in the initial batch on 7 April 1944. This was followed by orders of 9 at an unknown date, 22 on 9 October 1944, batches of 20, 16, and 12 at unknown dates during late 1944, then the final 12 on 6 January 1945.

Shipyards and companies involved in the vessels' construction included Stockton Construction at Thornaby (46), A. Findlay at Old Kilpatrick (27), Arrol at Alloa (25), Tees-Side Bridge at Middlesbrough (17), MacLellan at Bo'ness (12), Motherwell Bridge at Meadowside (12), Fairfield at Chepstow (12), Redpath Brown at Meadowside (11), Cleveland Dockyard at Middlesbrough (7), Warren Point Shipyard (8), Lagan at Belfast (8), and White at Cowes (2). In addition, individual hull sections were fabricated by Cargo Fleet of Stockton, Cleveland Bridge of Darlington, Whessoe Foundry of Darlington, Head Wrightson of Thornaby, and Appleby-Frodingham. Building designs were provided for both riveted and welded versions.

The first vessel was completed in June 1945. 30 were completed for the Royal Navy before the end of World War II meant that the vessels were no longer required; none of those completed saw wartime service. Of the remaining 157, 6 were sold into civilian service (4 directly, 2 to intermediate parties for conversion), while the rest were cancelled, scrapped in their incomplete state, or otherwise disposed of.

== Operational history ==
=== Royal Navy ===
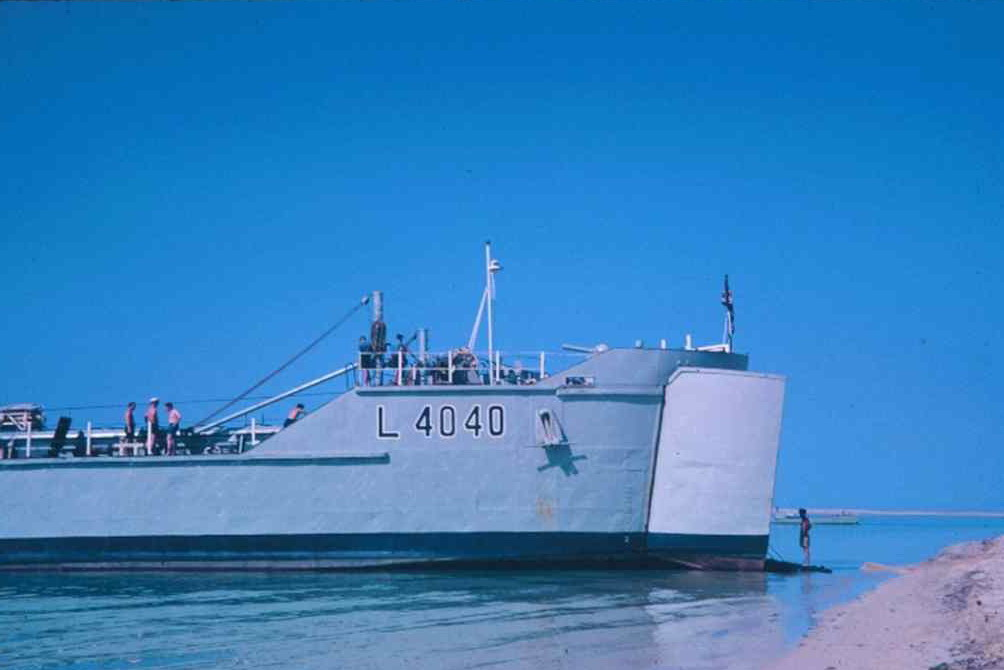
HMS Bastion beached and with her bow doors open

Nine ships in the class (HM Ships Redoubt, Rampart, Citadel, Parapet, Bastion, Counterguard, Portcullis, Sallyport, and Buttress) served during the 1956 Suez Crisis under Royal Navy control, while a tenth (L4086, later named HMAV Arromanches) operated with a civilian crew.

In 1961, Bastion, Redoubt, and the landing ship tank HMS Striker transported heavy stores and vehicles from Bahrain to Kuwait in support of Operation Vantage.

=== Army ===
The Suez Crisis highlighted the Army's need to train landing craft crews to respond to similar emergencies. Beginning in 1957, twelve LCT (8)s were transferred to the Army and stationed at Portsmouth: seven entered Army service between January and March of that year, while the other five followed later. The vessels were given names of Second World War battles, and were crewed by men of 76 Company, Royal Army Service Corps (RASC). The RASC Water Transport Training Unit, initially based at Fort Victoria on the Isle of Wight and later in Portsmouth, began running LCT training courses and supplied the vessels with crews (men on their National Service) until the unit closed in 1962.

In 1957–58, several of the LCTs took part in Operation Hardrock, a joint Army/RAF operation to create a guided weapons tracking station on the island of St Kilda, Scotland in the Hebrides. The vessels made exploratory voyages and subsequently delivered men and equipment from the mainland base at Cairnryan, at Loch Ryan, to islands like St Kilda, South Ford, and Lochboisdale. In the following years, they made supply runs from their base at Cairnryan to the islands. Landings were hazardous, due to weather and beach conditions, and on one occasion, Abbeville became grounded at Village Bay in St Kilda for three days.

In 1960, three of the LCTs (Ardennes, Agedabia and Arromanches) were transferred to Singapore. Whilst in service there, they carried out routine transport and ammunition-dumping activities, and were deployed in the Indonesian Confrontation in 1962. Two more LCTs (Antwerp and Arakan) were despatched to the region the following year.

In 1965/66, L4061 RASCV/HMAV Audemer transported a 52-ton GEC alternator (combined weight with the transporter was 82 tons), as well as a transformer and other equipment, to Jersey in the Channel Islands. The craft landed at St Aubins Bay, just below La Haule slip. This was part of the installation of the first 30MW steam turbine at the then under-construction La Collette Power Station in St Helier.

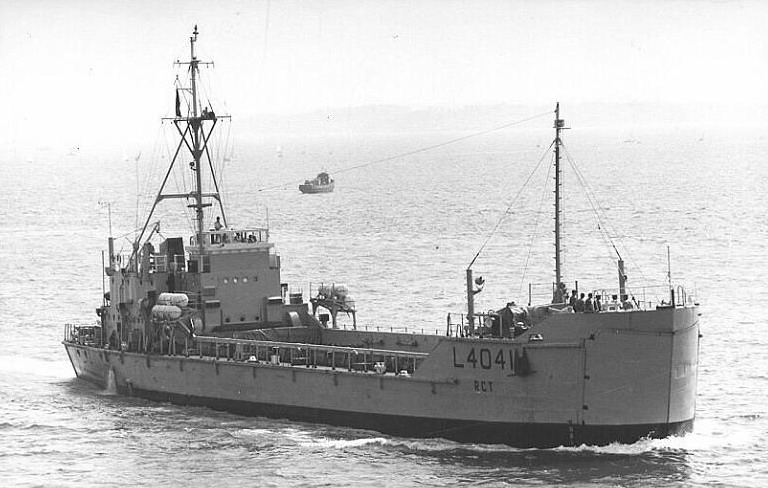
HMAV Abbeville. Note the Royal Corps of Transport (RCT) marking under the pennant number.

When the LCTs first entered service with the British Army, they were designated as Royal Army Service Corps Vessels (RASCV). In 1965, the RASC was amalgamated with the transportation arm of the Corps of Royal Engineers to form the Royal Corps of Transport. The following year, a Royal Warrant dictated that all RCT vessels would have their prefix changed to Her Majesty's Army Vessel (HMAV).

=== Other forces and civilian service ===
During the late 1950s, Jawada was loaned to the Qatar Petroleum Company. The landing craft was briefly recommissioned during late 1956 and early 1957 to serve as a tender to the cruiser HMS Superb, which was visiting Bahrain for amphibious warfare exercises.

Buttress was sold to the French Navy in July 1965: she was re-designated L 9061, then later Issole. She was then resold to the Military of Comoros in 1976, and operated as the naval vessel Ville de Nimachova. Counterguard was sold to the Royal Malaysian Navy in 1965 and renamed Sri Langkawi. The vessel operated under this name, until February 1968, when she was disposed of. Ardennes and Arromanches were sold to the Singaporean Navy in 1970, operating as Cairn Hill and Tanglin.

== Vessels in class ==
Pennant number	Name	Notes
L4001	HMS Redoubt	Was involved in the 1956 Suez Crisis. Sold January 1966 as a train ferry and renamed Dimitris.
L4002	RASCV/HMAV Agheila	Deployed to Aden in 1965.
L4025	–	Struck from service in 1960.
L4037	HMS Rampart; HMAV Akyab	As HMS Rampart, L4037 was involved in the 1956 Suez Crisis with the Royal Navy. Supported Operation Vantage in 1961. She was transferred to the Army in 1965 and renamed Akyab. Later returned to the Navy, then sold into mercantile service in 1988 as Rampart II. Compared to other vessels in the class, L4037 had a higher forecastle (which allowed larger tanks to board) and elevated bridge to improve visibility. The aft lattice mast was also larger.
L4038	HMS Citadel	Was involved in the 1956 Suez Crisis. Converted into a fleet degaussing vessel prior to 1968. Marked for disposal in 1968. Sold into mercantile service in 1971.
L4039	HMS Parapet	Was involved in the 1956 Suez Crisis. Sold into civilian service at Sark in 1966.
L4040	HMS Bastion	Was involved in the 1956 Suez Crisis. Supported Operation Vantage in 1961. Sold to Zambia on 15 September 1966.
L4041	RASCV/HMAV Abbeville	Ran aground at Village Bay in St Kilda for three days in 1957, but subsequently re-floated.
L4042	–	Struck from service in 1958.
L4043	HMS Counterguard	Was involved in the 1956 Suez Crisis. Sold to Malaysia in 1965 and renamed Sri Langkawi. Sold off for disposal in February 1968.
L4044	HMS Portcullis	Was involved in the 1956 Suez Crisis. Converted into a fleet degaussing unit prior to 1968. Marked for disposal in 1968. Sold to Pounds of Belfast and scrapped in 1973.
L4045	–	Struck from service in 1958.
L4049	–	Struck from service in 1960.
L4050	–	Struck from service in 1960.
L4061	RASCV/HMAV Audemer	Superstructure enlarged to house extra staff when the vessel was converted to a Squadron HQ in 1961.
L4062	RASCV/HMAV Aachen	Sold into civilian service in 1976.
L4063	HMS Jawada	Loaned to a civilian company, later disposed of in Bahrain. Struck from service in 1960.
L4064	HMS Sallyport	Was involved in the 1956 Suez Crisis. Sold in 1966 in Malta to a Greek shipping company and renamed Faedra.
L4073	RASCV/HMAV Ardennes	After being deployed to Singapore in 1960. the vessel was sold to the Singaporean Navy in 1970. It remained in service as the Singapore naval vessel Cairn Hill until 1975.
L4074	RASCV/HMAV Antwerp	Deployed to the Far East during the Indonesian Confrontation. Remained in service with the Army until 1976.
L4085	RASCV/HMAV Agedabia	
L4086	RASCV/HMAV Arromanches	Distinguishable from other units in the class by a larger lattice mast. Took part in the 1956 Suez Crisis with a civilian crew. Sold to the Singaporean Navy in 1970 and operated as the Singaporean naval vessel Tanglin. Sold into civilian service as Sumber Tunas IV in 1988.
L4097	RASCV/HMAV Andalsnes	Was used on 8 July 1967 to transport a scanner and other Outside Broadcast equipment when the BBC made its world famous documentary about climbers on The Old Man of Hoy.
L4098	–	Struck from service in 1960.
L4099	HMS Buttress	Was involved in the 1956 Suez Crisis. During this deployment, Buttress lost her mast while alongside the aircraft carrier HMS Theseus, when it collided with a sponson. Sold to France in July 1965 and renamed L 9061, then Issole. Paid off by the French navy in 1975, sold to the Military of Comoros in 1976, and operated as the naval vessel Ville de Nimachova. Sold on again in 1994.
L4128	RASCV/HMAV Arezzo	Deployed to Bahrain in 1965. Was wrecked in The Strait of Malacca between The Malay Peninsula and Sumatra in April 1973
L4148	–	Struck from service in 1958.
L4156	–	Struck from service in 1958.
L4164	RASCV/HMAV Arakan	Sold into civilian service in 1988 and operated as Sumber Tunas VI.
L4165	–	Struck from service in 1958.
