= RFA Sir Galahad (1986) =

Landing ship logistics of the Royal Fleet Auxiliary and Brazilian Navy

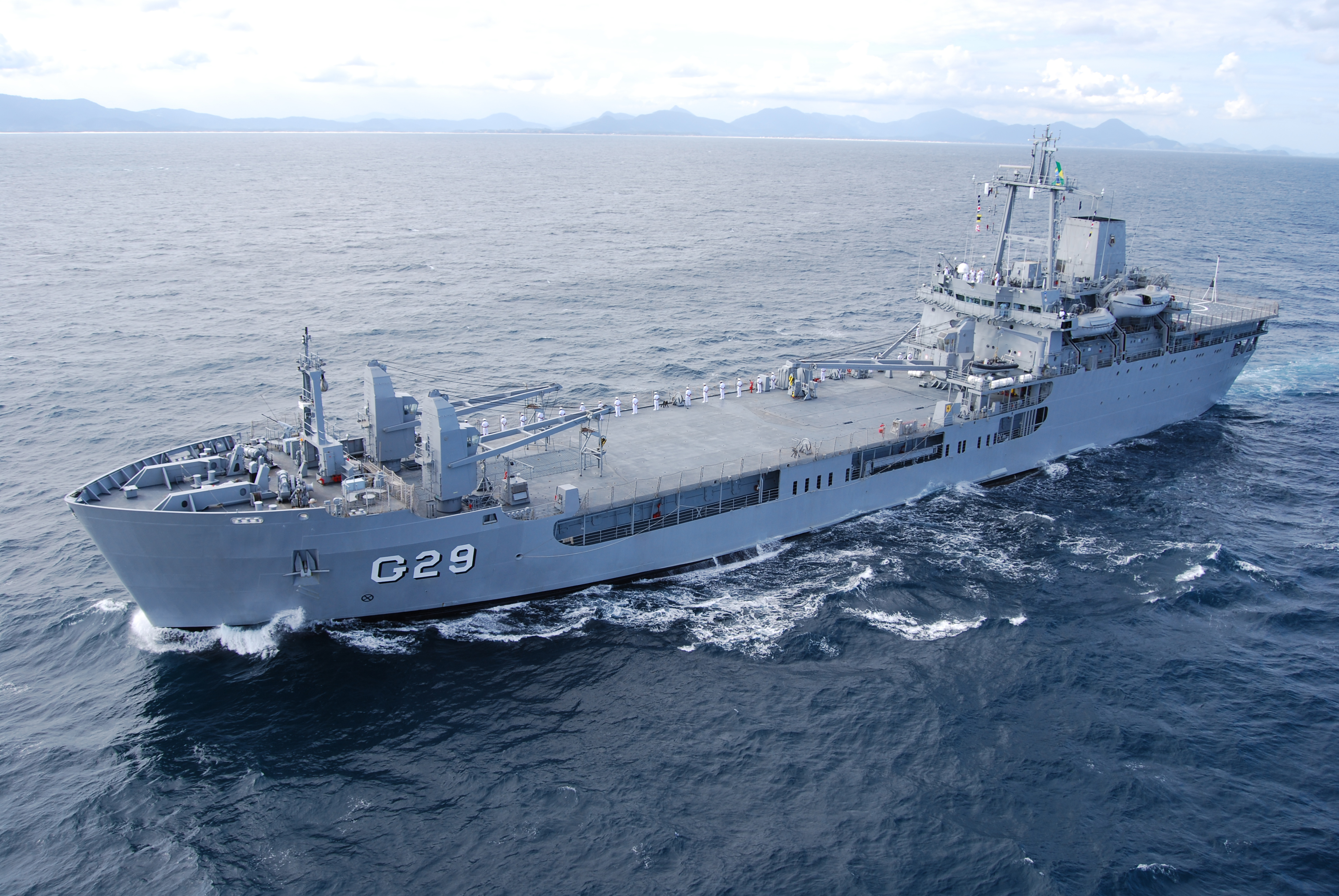

History

United Kingdom
- Name: RFA Sir Galahad
- Ordered: 6 September 1984
- Builder: Swan Hunter
- Laid down: 12 May 1985
- Launched: 13 December 1986
- Commissioned: 25 November 1987
- Decommissioned: 2006
- Out of service: 2007
- Identification: IMO number: 8414635
- Fate: Sold to Brazil

Brazil
- Name: Garcia D'Avila
- Launched: 1987
- Commissioned: 4 December 2007
- Decommissioned: 29 October 2019
- Identification: IMO number: 8414635; MMSI number: 710471000; Callsign: PWDV
- Fate: Sunk as target 2024

General characteristics
- Class & type: Landing ship logistics (LSL)
- Displacement: 8,751 tonnes
- Length: 460 ft (140 m)
- Beam: 64 ft (20 m)
- Draught: 15 ft (4.6 m)
- Propulsion: Two 6600 hp (4,900 kW) Mirrlees Blackstone K9 Major Mk. II diesels; one 400 hp (300 kW) bow thruster
- Speed: 14 knots (26 km/h) (cruising); 17 knots (31 km/h) (max)
- Capacity: 400 troops; 3,440 tonnes of supplies
- Complement: 49
- Armament: Two Oerlikon 20 mm guns; two 7.62 mm machineguns
- Aircraft carried: One pad aft for Westland Sea King or smaller; One pad amidships for CH-47 Chinook or smaller

RFA Sir Galahad (L3005) was a landing ship logistics (LSL) of the Royal Fleet Auxiliary, later in service with the Brazilian Navy as the NDCC Garcia D'Avila.

== Construction and design ==
Sir Galahad was ordered on 6 September 1984 to a design by the shipbuilder Swan Hunter, as a replacement for the landing ship of the same name that had been sunk in the 1982 Falklands War. The ship was laid down at Swan Hunter's Wallsend shipyard on 12 July 1985, was launched on 13 December 1986 and completed on 19 July 1987, entering service on 7 December that year.

The ship was 140.16 m (459 ft 10 in) long overall and 126.00 m (413 ft 5 in) between perpendiculars, with a beam of 19.50 m (64 ft 0 in) and a draught of 4.50 m (14 ft 9 in) at full load and 3.97 m (13 ft 0 in) light. Displacement was 7,400 long tons (7,500 t) light and 8,541 long tons (8,678 t) full load. The ship was powered by two Mirrlees Blackstone K9 Major diesel engines, rated at a total of 13,320 bhp (9,930 kW) which drove two propeller shafts, giving a speed of 18 kn (21 mph; 33 km/h). The ship had a range of 13,000 nmi (15,000 mi; 24,000 km).

== Service ==
RFA Sir Galahad was built by Swan Hunter and entered service in 1988. She was named and given the identical pennant number to the Sir Galahad sunk in the Falklands War. Built as a combined landing craft and ferry with two flight decks for helicopters and bow and stern doors, there was capacity for around 400 troops and 3,440 tonnes of supplies.

She was deployed in 1991 for Operation Granby, 1995 in Angola Operation Chantress and in 2003 for Operation Telic to transport supplies. In 2003 Sir Galahad transported humanitarian aid, docking in Umm Qasr Port on 28 March 2003, after being delayed while naval mines were cleared.

On 26 April 2007, it was announced that she was to be purchased by Brazil. On 20 July 2006, the ship sailed from Marchwood to Portsmouth, to be decommissioned.

She was commissioned into the Brazilian Navy as Navio de Desembarque de Carros de Combate (NDCC) Garcia D'Avila on 4 December 2007.

In Brazilian service, she was responsible for transporting vehicles and supplies to Port-au-Prince in support of United Nations peacekeepers deployed in Haiti during MINUSTAH.

In June 2019 it was announced than the ship will be decommissioned on 29 October 2019.

On 20 February 2024, the Brazilian Navy announced the former RFA Sir Galahad will be used later that week to conduct SINKEX (a naval ship sinking exercise) as a target for two helicopter-launched Penguin MK2 MOD7 missiles and a submarine-launched Mk48 torpedo.

== Gallery ==
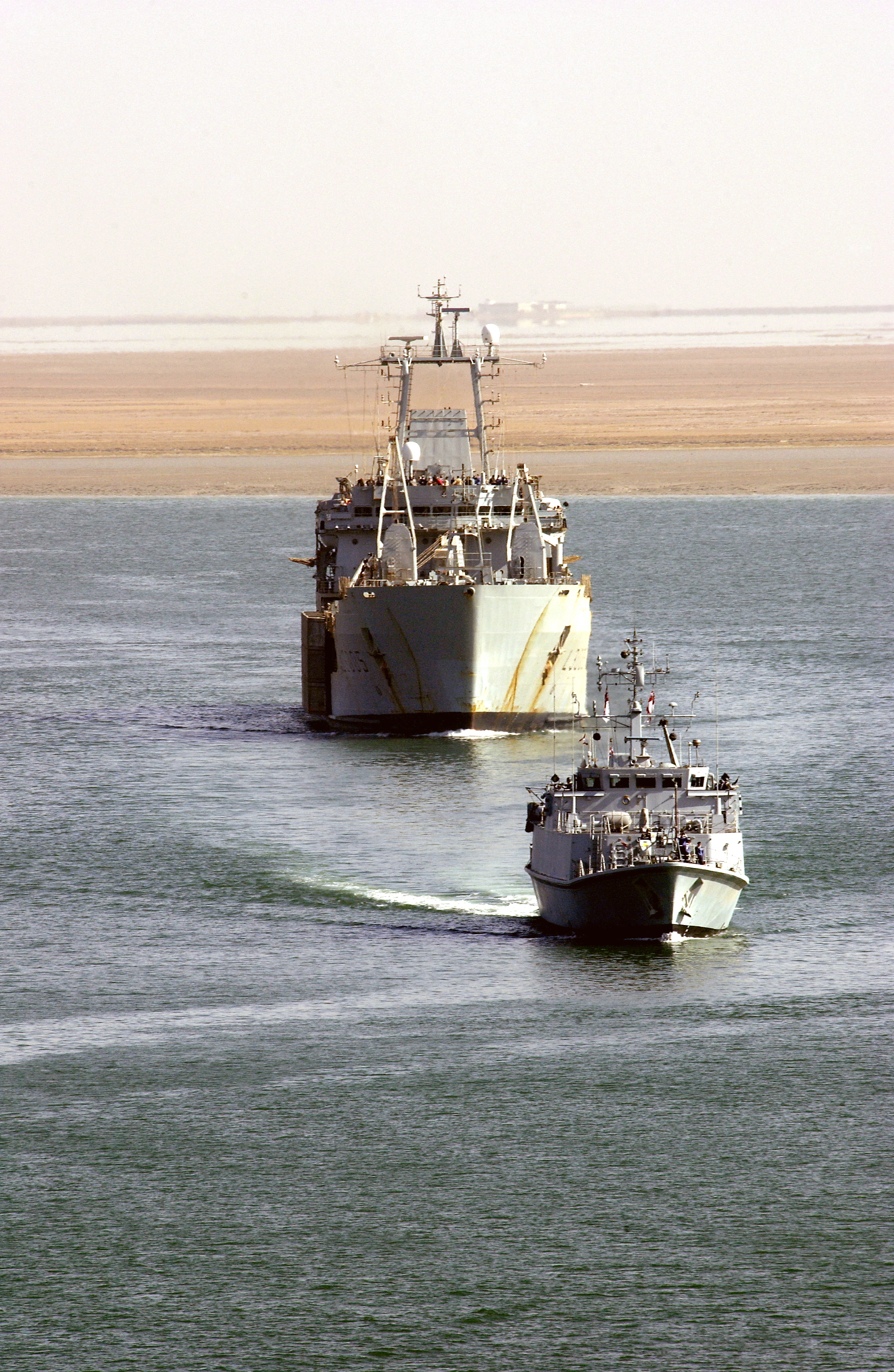
RFA Sir Galahad arrives in the Iraqi port city of Umm Qasr on 28 March 2003

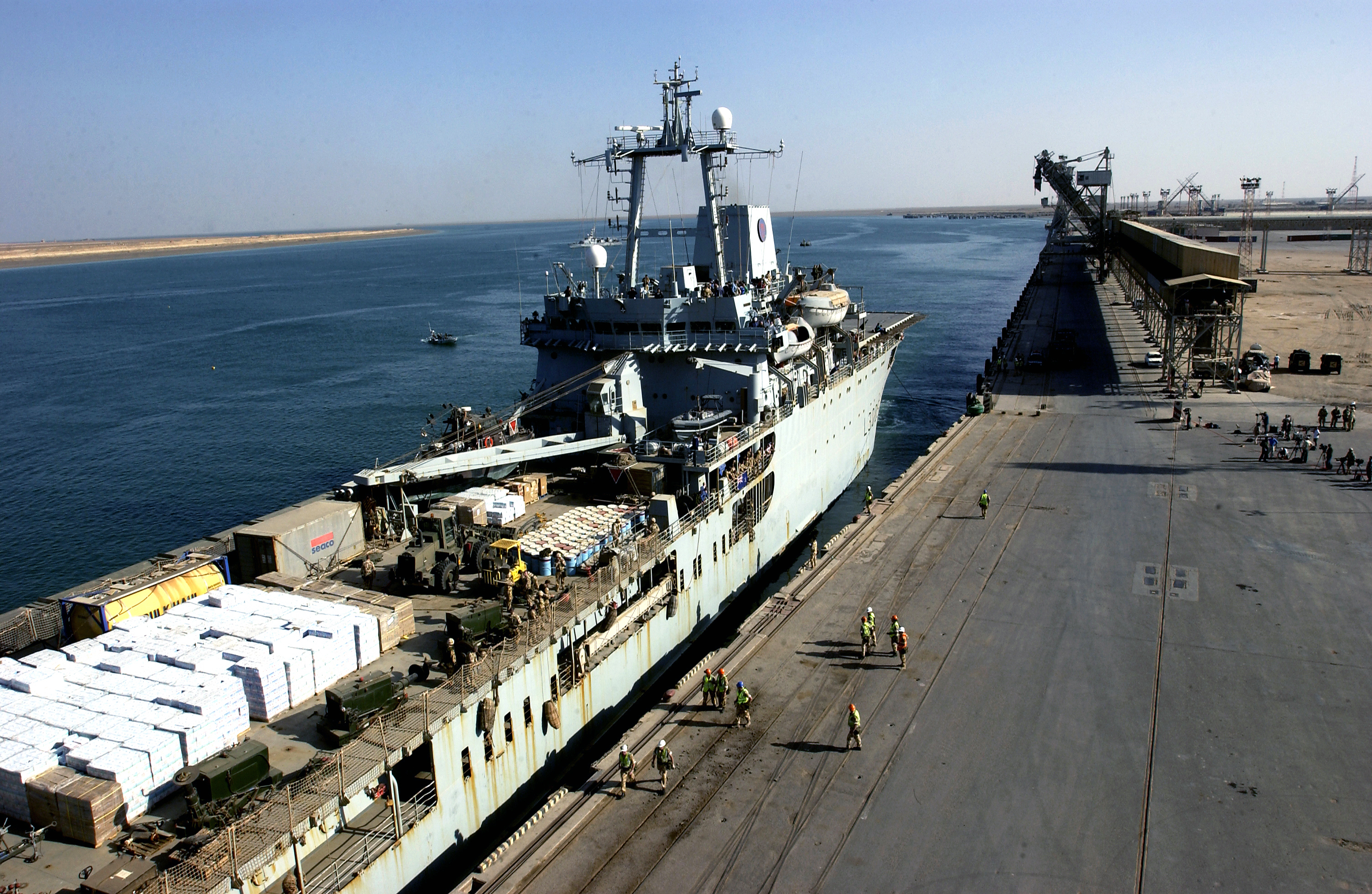
RFA Sir Galahad in Umm Qasr, delivering the first shipment of humanitarian aid from Coalition forces.

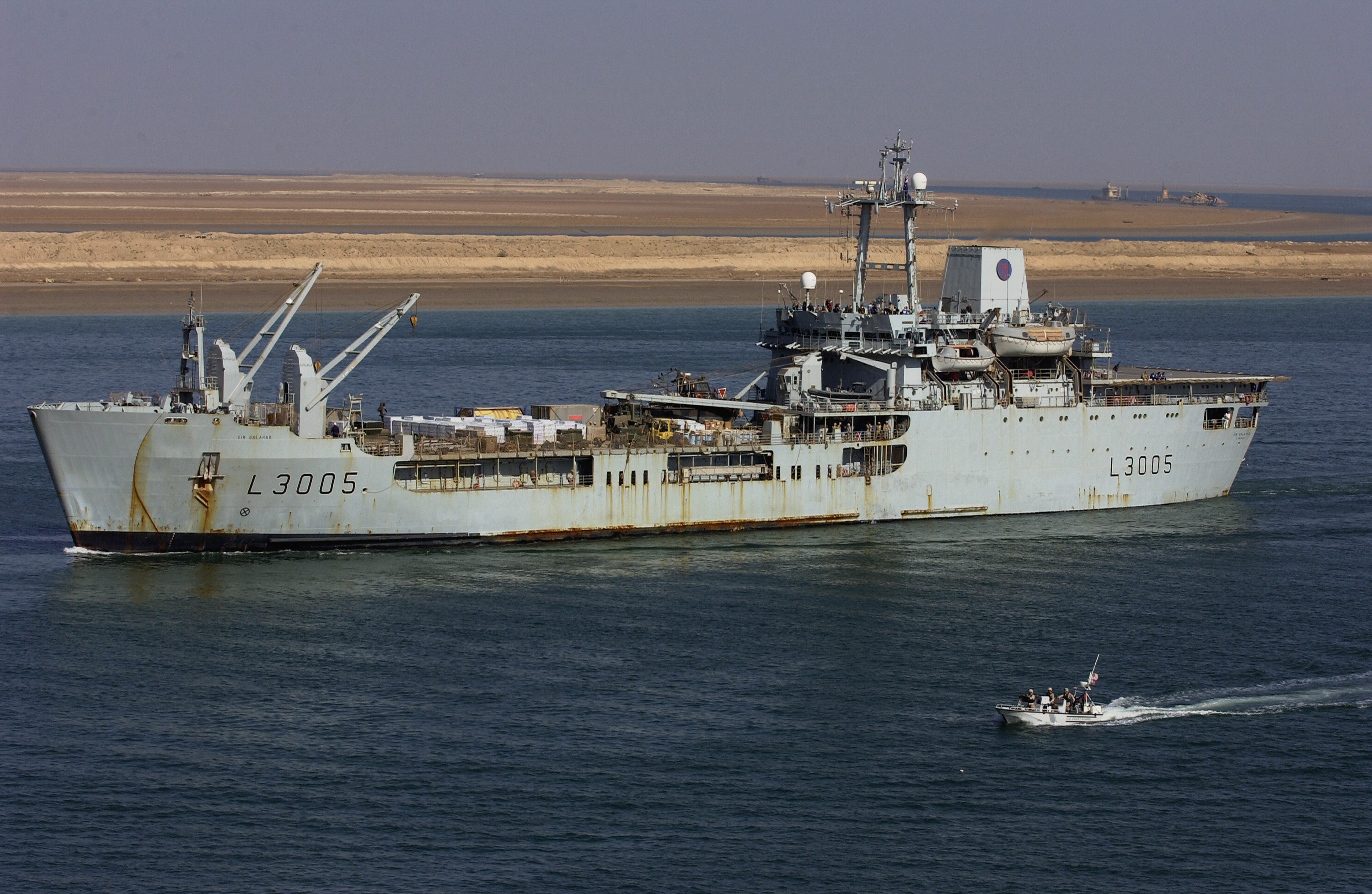
RFA Sir Galahad in 2003.

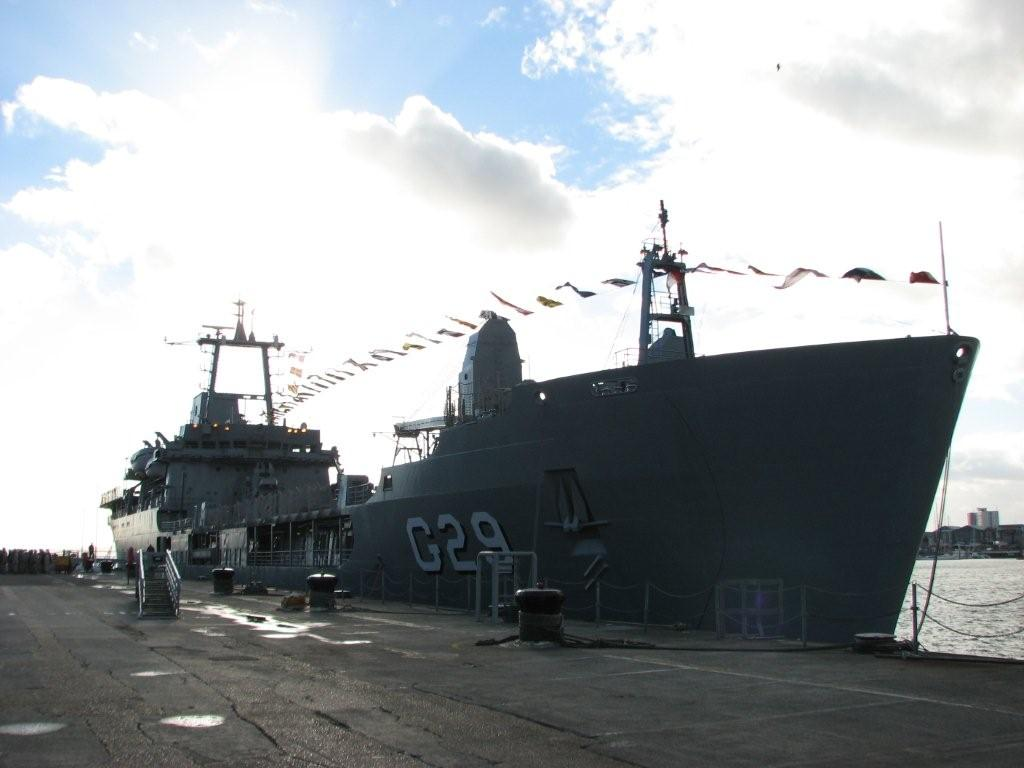
Ex RFA Sir Galahad (G-29) in 2007.

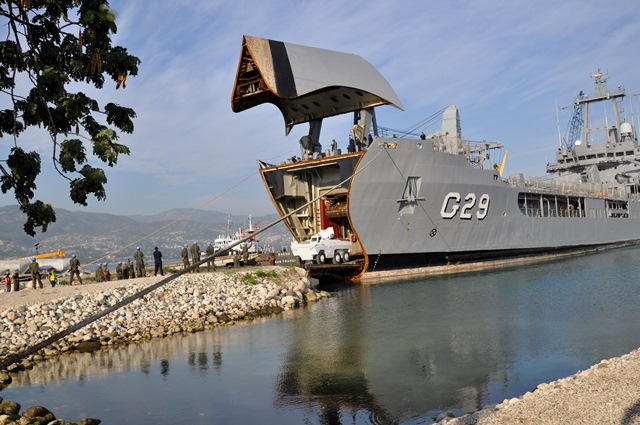
NDCC Garcia D'Ávila unloading an APC during MINUSTAH in Port-au-Prince, 2013.
