= Fitzroy, Falkland Islands =

Settlement on East Falkland

Coordinates: 51.7875°S 58.2312°W

Fitzroy within the Falkland Islands

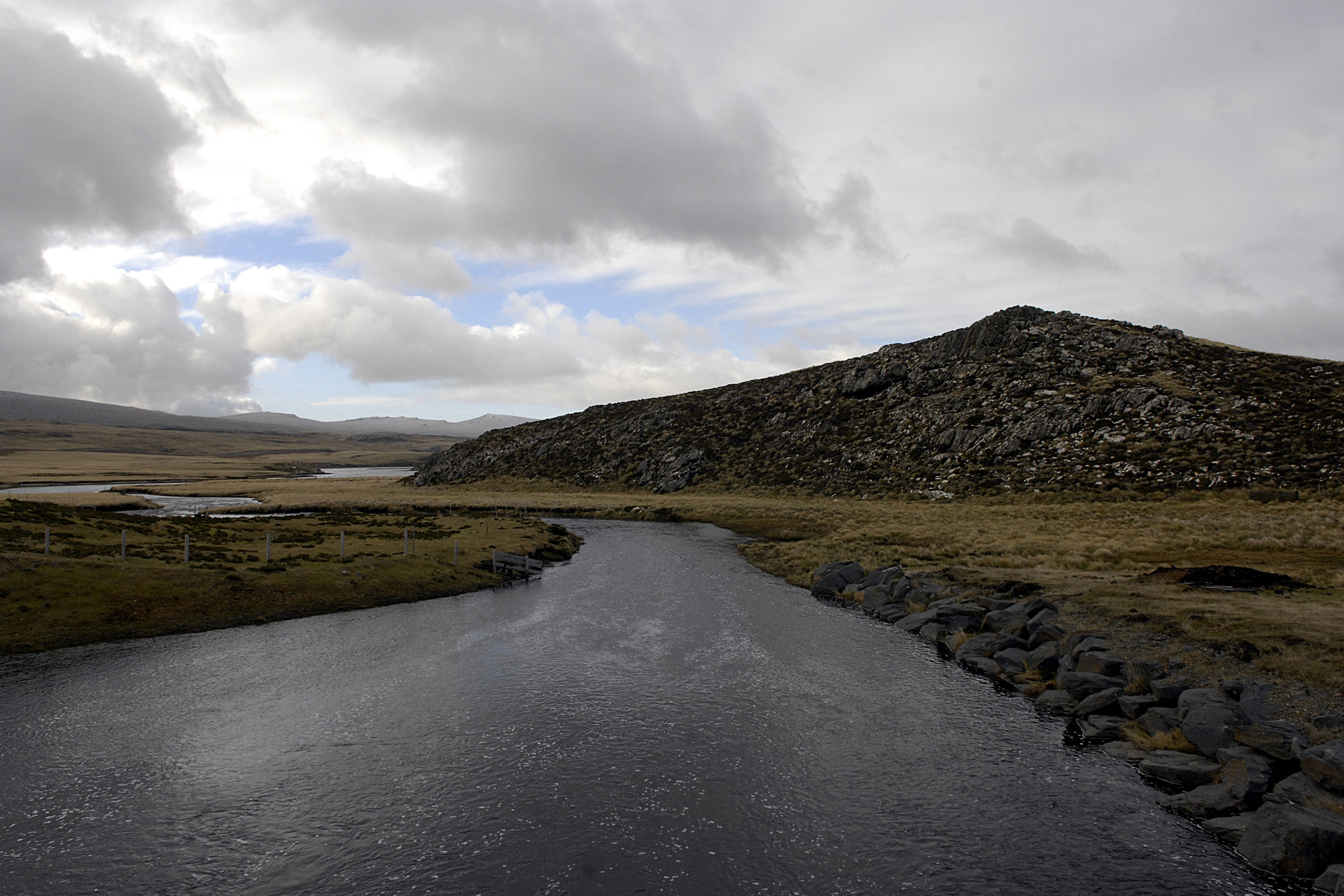
Fitzroy River looking upstream from Darwin Road (the road which connects Port Stanley and Mount Pleasant/Lafonia

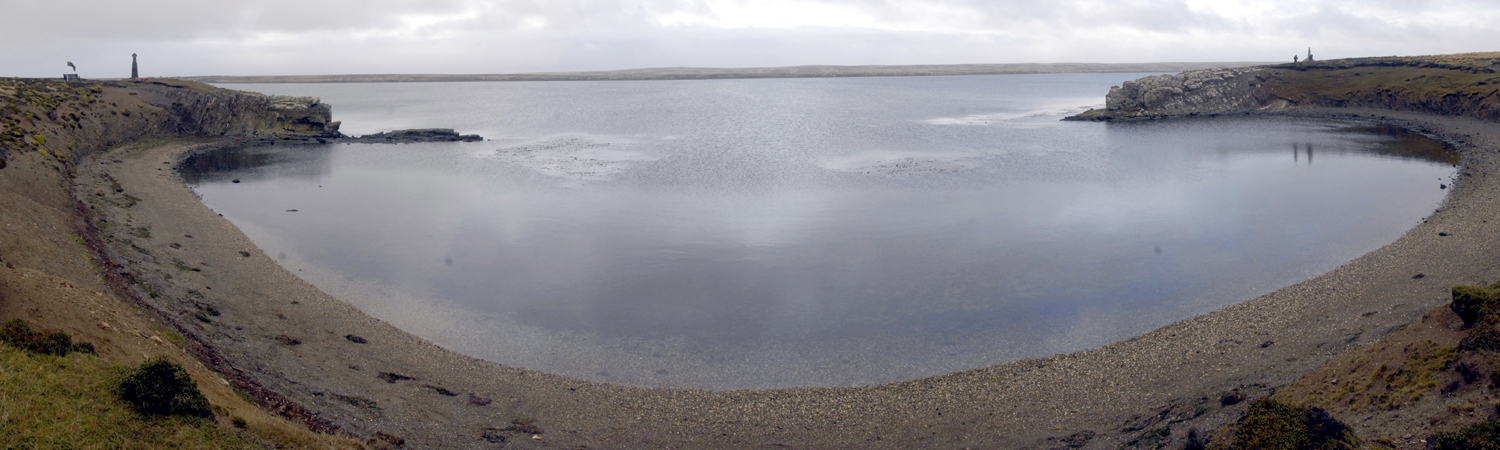
A panorama at Fitzroy showing the two memorials to those lost when the RFA ships Sir Galahad and Sir Tristam were attacked during the Falklands Conflict

Fitzroy is a settlement on East Falkland. It is divided into Fitzroy North and Fitzroy South by a tidal river called Fitzroy River that is fed from a lake on the east side of Mount Whickham. The river was forded by Charles Darwin when he visited for a second time in 1834. Fitzroy itself is 9 metres (30 ft) above sea level, and 14.9 nautical miles (27.6 km; 17.1 mi) west of Port Stanley. The population of the settlement in 2018 was eight people, and nearly 18,600 sheep.

It is named after Robert FitzRoy, who commanded HMS Beagle during Darwin's voyages, and later developed a system of weather forecasting for the United Kingdom. Fitzroy is on the inlet known as Port Pleasant.

In 1934, Patterson Point Bridge was built across the small inlet north of Fitzroy. The bridge was built on concrete piles with wooden sides, and the railings came from the wreck of the SS Great Britain. The bridge was destroyed by the Argentines during the Falklands War, and although it was repaired, it suffered further damage in 2013 during a storm.

In 2013, an aquaculture business was created on Fitzroy Sound to sell trout on the international market.

== Wartime ==
On 8 December 1914, German ships appeared in Port Pleasant, near Fitzroy. One local woman kept the authorities at Stanley informed of their progress (they were steaming eastwards) by sending her staff to a good vantage point on Fitzroy Ridge.

During the 1982 Falklands War, naval auxiliary ships Sir Galahad and Sir Tristram, carrying contingents of The Welsh Guards, were bombed by the Argentine Air Force in the waters off Fitzroy whilst attempting to reinforce soldiers encamped there. A monument on each side of a small cove at Fitzroy commemorates each ship with dedications in English and Welsh on both.
