= Landing ship logistics =

British navy terminology

Landing ship logistics (LSL) was a term used by the United Kingdom armed forces to describe the Round Table class of landing ship used in the support of amphibious warfare missions. These ships were operated by the Royal Fleet Auxiliary. The last ship in service sailed home for the last time in 2008 and the class has been replaced by the new Bay class ships, which are described as landing ship dock (LSD).

== Bibliography ==
- Preston, Antony (1995). "United Kingdom". In Chumbley, Stephen (ed.). Conway's All The World's Fighting Ships 1947–1995. Annapolis, Maryland: Naval Institute Press. pp. 479–543. ISBN 1-55750-132-7.
