= HMS Sheffield =

Three Royal Navy warships have been named HMS Sheffield after the city and county borough of Sheffield, South Yorkshire.

- HMS Sheffield (C24) (1936) – a Town-class light cruiser which saw service in World War II from the Arctic Circle and the Atlantic to the Mediterranean. She was one of the Royal Navy pursuit ships that tracked down the German battleship Bismarck. She was sold and scrapped in 1967.
- HMS Sheffield (D80) (1971) – a Type 42 destroyer badly damaged by the Argentinian air forces on 4 May 1982 during the Falklands War. While being towed towards South Georgia Island, she sank in heavy seas.
- HMS Sheffield (F96) (1986) – a Type 22 frigate sold to the Chilean Navy in 2003 and renamed Almirante Williams.
- HMS Sheffield (Type 26 frigate) will be a Type 26 frigate.

All three of these warships have carried many fixtures and fittings manufactured in Sheffield itself, including a great number of stainless steel items, leading to the nickname that has been applied to all of them: the "Shiny Sheff".

== Battle honours ==
- Norway 1940
- Spartivento 1940
- Atlantic 1941–43
- Bismarck 1941
- Mediterranean 1941
- Malta Convoys 1941
- Arctic 1941–43
- North Africa 1942
- Barents Sea 1942
- Biscay 1943
- Salerno 1943
- North Cape 1943
- Falkland Islands 1982
