= Exercise Spring Train =

Naval exercise

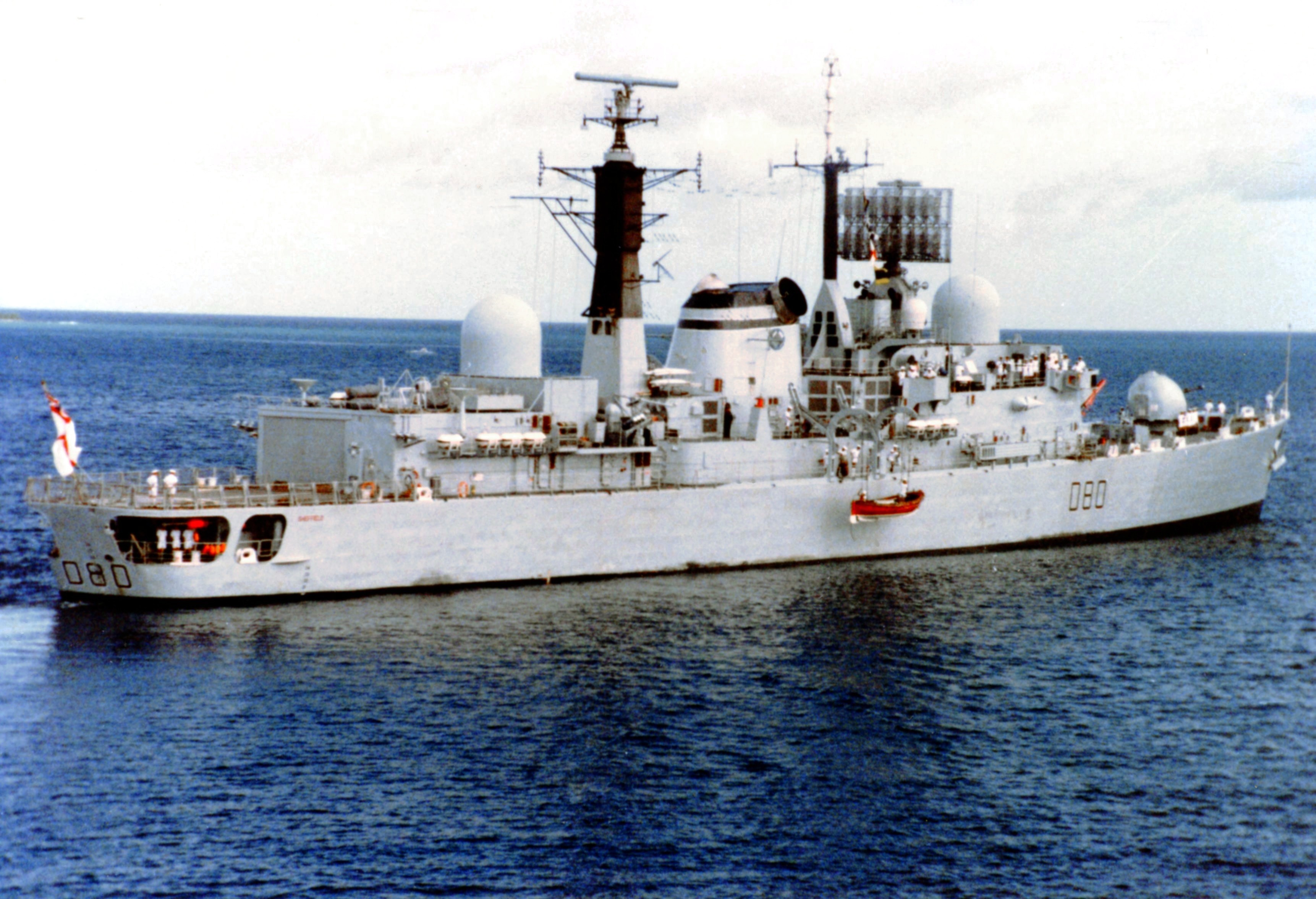
Sheffield pictured one month before the 1982 exercise

Exercise Spring Train (also referred to as Springtrain) was an annual Royal Navy-led NATO maritime exercise conducted in the Eastern Atlantic. It is most notable for the 1982 exercise which involved seven warships that were subsequently sent to the South Atlantic after the Argentine invasion of the Falkland Islands. Because the vessels involved already had full crews and were able to crossdeck supplies from other ships in the exercise the British response was more rapid than would have otherwise been possible. Two of the vessels involved in the exercise, the Type 42 destroyers Sheffield and Coventry, were sunk during the war. There has been speculation that some of the ships sent to the Falklands from Exercise Spring Train were carrying tactical nuclear weapons, which were routinely carried when on NATO deployments. The 1983 edition of the exercise was criticised by the Spanish and Soviet government who considered it provocative.

== Early exercises ==
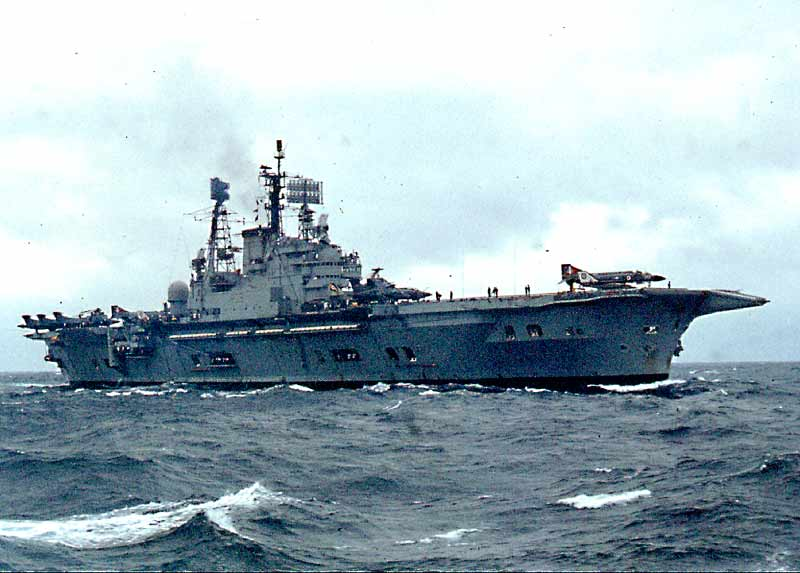
HMS Ark Royal in 1976

The Amphion-class submarine Affray was en route to Exercise Spring Train in June 1951 when it was lost with all 75 hands near Alderney. This edition of Spring Train was UK-based, centering on the landing of special forces troops on a Cornish beach. Spring Train later became an annual exercise for NATO naval forces, led by the Royal Navy. It was based from the British dockyard in Gibraltar with operations conducted in the deep waters of the Eastern Atlantic which were ideal for anti-submarine warfare exercises. The 1976 exercise, carried out in February, was attended by the Audacious-class aircraft carrier Ark Royal, the Tiger-class cruiser Blake and two Royal Fleet Auxiliary vessels. A BBC crew, filming for the documentary series Sailor was onboard Ark Royal during the exercise.

Exercise Spring Train 1977 ran from 20 to 27 February and was attended by the US Navy's Knox-class frigate Miller. The next year's exercise also ran in February and was attended by the British Centaur-class aircraft carrier Hermes. HMS London participated in the 1981 exercise, one of her few sailings that year due to restrictions on fuel expenditure. She sailed from Portsmouth to Gibraltar in mid-March. Also present were the Type 42 destroyer Newcastle, the Type 12M frigate Rothesay and the Royal Fleet Auxiliary vessels Fort Grange and Olna. The 1981 exercise included a 2-week minesweeping exercise in May attended by the Ton-class minesweeper Glasserton, crewed by sailors from the Royal Naval Reserve.

== 1982 exercise ==
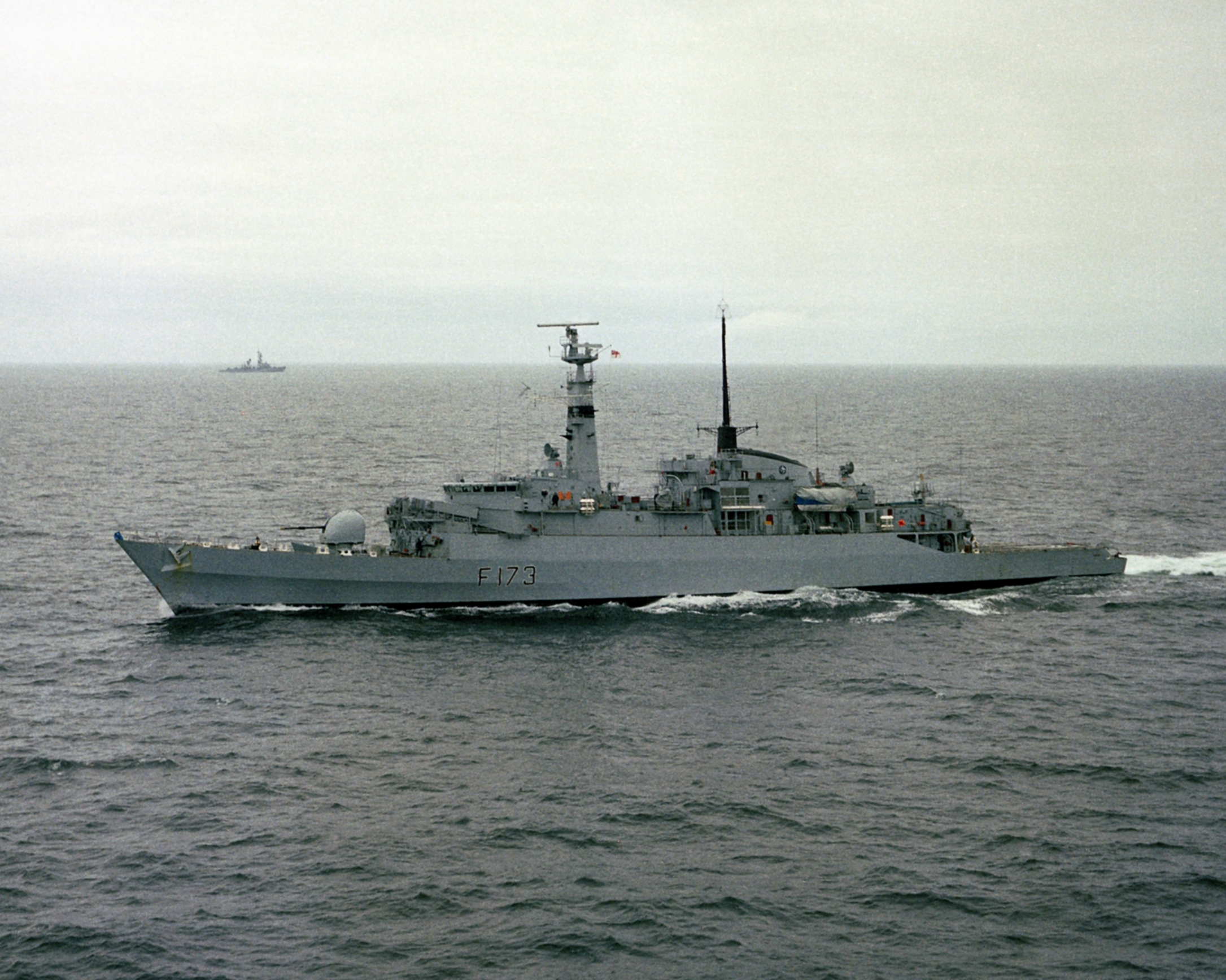
HMS Arrow in 1982

The 1982 exercise took place off Gibraltar from late March, the vessels involved having left Britain on 17 March. Some 18 British destroyers and frigates participated in the exercise including the County-class destroyers Antrim and Glamorgan; the Type 42 destroyers Sheffield, Coventry and Glasgow; the Type 22 frigates Brilliant, Broadsword and Battleaxe; the Type 21 frigates Arrow and Active; the Leander-class frigates Aurora, Ariadne, Dido and Euryalus. The Swiftsure-class submarines Spartan and Superb also attended. A number of support vessels were also present for the exercise, which was commanded from Antrim by Rear Admiral Sandy Woodward, whose First Flotilla provided many of the warships.

Phase one of the operation, largely working-up exercises, lasted until 26 March when the vessels put into the docks at Gibraltar for rest and resupply. Tensions with Argentina over British territories in the South Atlantic had been increasing since the landing of Argentine scrap merchants in South Georgia on 19 March. On 26 March the support ship RFA Fort Austin was ordered to leave the exercise and proceed to the South Atlantic to support HMS Endurance. Fort Austin eventually met with Endurance on 14 April. On 29 March the Secretary of State for Defence John Nott met with the First Sea Lord, Admiral Sir Henry Leach to discuss the situation. As a result of this meeting Spartan was ordered to leave Spring Train and proceed to the Falklands. Spartan immediately docked at Gibraltar to swap her practice torpedoes for live ones and sailed south on 1 April, within 48 hours of receiving the order. Spartan, being on exercise, was the only submarine that could immediately be tasked to sail (Superb having been sent to the Western Approaches to investigate two reported Soviet submarines) but was later joined by others sent from HMNB Clyde.

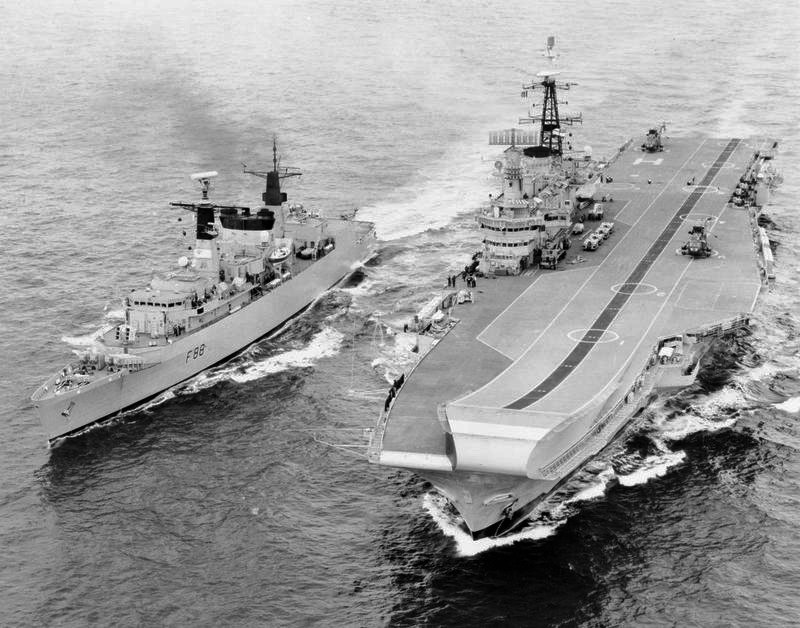
HMS Broadsword and Hermes in April 1982

Phase 2 of the exercise commenced on 29 March and included high-speed firings of the Sea Dart surface-to-air missile at sea off Casablanca. The Commander-in-Chief Fleet, Admiral Sir John Fieldhouse, was observing the exercise from aboard Glamorgan. On 30 March he ordered Woodward to fly over to join him and they discussed the situation in the South Atlantic for around an hour, including what role First Flotilla would play in any taskforce. Fieldhouse then flew to Gibraltar and returned to London. On 1 April Antrim's Wessex helicopter took part in live firing exercises. Later that day British Prime Minister Margaret Thatcher ordered Woodward, via Leach, to assemble a task force from units on exercise and prepare to head south covertly. Woodward selected seven ships: Antrim, Glamorgan, Coventry, Glasgow, Sheffield, Arrow, Brilliant with the remainder ordered to return to British ports owing to their age or mechanical condition. There began a hurried crossdecking operation via helicopter and jackstay in which southward-bound vessels took on quantities of food, ammunition and spare parts from homeward-bound ships and in return offloaded their practice ammunition. Crew members granted leave for compassionate reasons were transferred to homeward-bound ships and replaced by volunteers from the other vessels; personal telegrams written by men headed south were also transferred. The operation benefitted from unusually calm seas and, with the issuing of the usual paperwork suspended, was completed within 12 hours. Six vessels sailed south on 2 April, with the remaining ship, a frigate, following on 3 April. The tankers RFA Tidespring and Appleleaf, who had participated in Spring Train, were also sent to the South Atlantic. The Spring Train ships were joined at sea by four other destroyers, seven frigates, two aircraft carriers and other vessels sent from the UK. Argentina invaded the Falkland Islands on 2 April but Woodward's taskforce succeeded in recapturing the islands by 14 June. The Exercise Spring Train 1982 vessels Sheffield and Coventry were both sunk by Argentine air attack during the war.

The cancellation of Exercise Spring Train became known to Argentine intelligence via media reports from London and gave an indication that the British were preparing military action in response to the crisis. Had the Argentine invasion preparations been delayed slightly it might have hampered the British response as the Spring Train ships were due to return to British ports and their crews to be sent on Easter leave. Sheffield, for example, was due to have returned to port just six days after she was ordered south. As it happened the timing of the exercise meant that the Royal Navy had many of its best ships at top operational efficiency and well positioned to head south at the time of the invasion.

=== Nuclear weapons ===
There is some evidence that some of the British vessels may have retained tactical nuclear weapons that they were carrying when sent from the exercise, though these were removed en-route and consigned to a vessel kept outside of the conflict area. When the ships sailed Nott stated that they carried their "full range of weapons" and were "sailing under wartime orders with wartime stocks of weapons". The government stated that nuclear weapons were not applicable to the Falklands conflict but did not deny their presence. The Observer at the time reported that nuclear weapons were almost certainly present on some of the ships and its correspondent, Andrew Wilson, claimed to have spoken to one frigate captain who refused to leave for war without his complement of tactical nuclear weapons. Wilson reported that the task force was carrying nuclear depth charges for the Westland Sea King helicopters and free-fall bombs for the Harrier jets which were part of their usual NATO equipment. Sheffield was reportedly one of the vessels carrying nuclear depth charges. According to Member of Parliament Tam Dalyell some of the weapons were recovered from outward bound ships by helicopter when the ships were in the Western Approaches, by a Ministry of Defence concerned about sending such a large proportion of its nuclear arsenal away from the UK. Paul Rogers claims that a number of nuclear weapons which reached Ascension Island were offloaded to RFA Regent which was kept outside the conflict zone. Some reports claim that Sheffield and Coventry were still carrying nuclear depth charges when sunk though Rogers considers this unlikely.

== Post-1982 ==
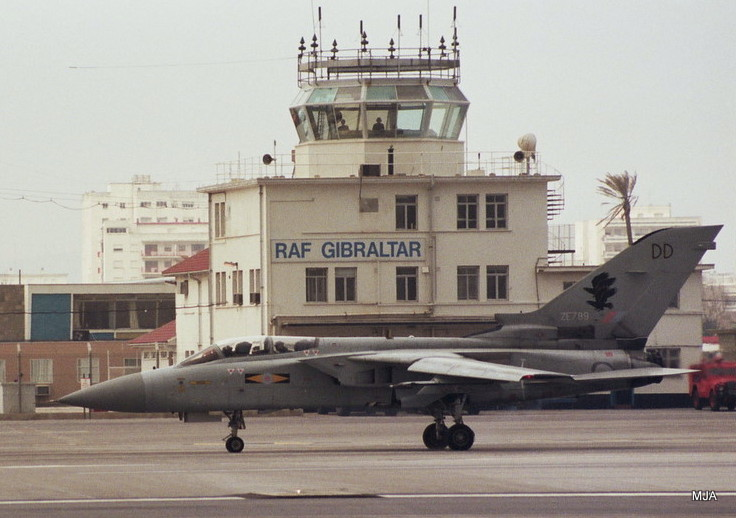
A Tornado at RAF Gibraltar during Exercise Spring Train 1989

Spring Train 1983, held in mid-April, saw 12 Royal Navy warships headed by the aircraft carrier Invincible, and four support vessels simulate a defence of Gibraltar against a Spanish invasion. The vessels included, besides Invincible, the Type 82 destroyer Bristol; the Type 42 destroyer Newcastle; the Type 22 frigate Battleaxe; the Leander-class frigates Arethusa and Euryalus; Tribal-class frigate Zulu; the Rothesay-class frigate Rhyl; the Oberon-class submarine Otus; the Swiftsure-class submarine Splendid and the support vessels RFA Olwen and Resource. A large number of Royal Air Force Hawker Siddeley Nimrod, Blackburn Buccaneer and SEPECAT Jaguar aircraft were also sent to RAF Gibraltar to take part. The exercise was commanded by Rear Admiral Robert Gerken, Flag Officer, Second Flotilla. The Spanish government lodged a diplomatic protest against the exercise and associated ship movements; it was also objected to by the Soviet government who called it provocative. The British vessels in the exercise were shadowed by two Spanish frigates and a destroyer. Specific attention was paid during the exercise to anti-submarine warfare with the surface vessels hunting Splendid and Otus. Anti-aircraft procedures, which proved important during the Falklands War, were also practised against the RAF aircraft. The exercises were focused on two areas, one 150 miles (240 km) west of Gibraltar (in the Atlantic) and one 40 miles (64 km) east of Gibraltar (in the Mediterranean) and practice missile firings were carried out in both areas. The British vessels returned to Portsmouth at the completion of the exercise at the end of April.

The 1989 exercise included the aircraft carrier Ark Royal and lasted from 1 to 21 April.
