= Chilean frigate Almirante Williams =

Type 22 frigate originally built for Royal Navy, now in service with the Chilean Navy

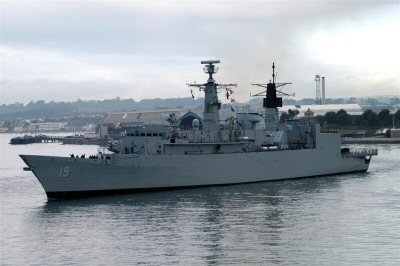
- The Chilean Navy's Almirante Williams

History

United Kingdom
- Name: Sheffield
- Namesake: Sheffield
- Builder: Swan Hunter, Tyne and Wear, United Kingdom
- Laid down: 29 March 1984
- Launched: 26 March 1986
- Commissioned: 26 July 1988
- Decommissioned: 5 November 2002
- Identification: Pennant number: F96
- Motto: Deo Adjuvante Labor Proficit; (Latin: "With God's help our labour is successful")
- Nickname(s): Shiny Sheff
- Fate: Sold to Chile

Chile
- Name: Almirante Williams
- Commissioned: 4 September 2003
- Identification: Pennant number: FF-19
- Status: In active service

General characteristics
- Class & type: Type 22 frigate
- Displacement: 4,900 tons
- Length: 148.2 m (486 ft 3 in)
- Beam: 14.7 m (48 ft 3 in)
- Draught: 6.4 m (21 ft 0 in)
- Speed: 33 kilometres per hour (18 kn; 21 mph) cruise; 56 kilometres per hour (30 kn; 35 mph) sprint
- Complement: 250
- Sensors & processing systems: In Chilean Navy service; 1 × Marconi Type 967M air/surface search; 1 × ELTA EL/M-2238 air search; 2 × ELTA EL/M-2221GM fire-control
- Electronic warfare & decoys: In Chilean Navy service Terma SKWS
- Armament: In Royal Navy service; 2 × 6 GWS25 Seawolf SAM Launchers; 4 × 1 Exocet SSM launchers; 2 × Twin 30 mm AA; 2 × 20 mm GAM-BO1 guns; 4 × 7.62 mm GPMG; In Chilean Navy service; 1 × Otobreda 76 mm; 2 × GAM-BO1 guns; 4 × Harpoon; Barak 1 surface-to-air missile
- Aircraft carried: As Sheffield: Lynx Mk.8 helicopter; As Almirante Williams: Eurocopter Dauphin helicopter

Almirante Williams is a Type 22 frigate in service with the Chilean Navy. It entered service with the British Royal Navy in 1988 with the name HMS Sheffield, and served with the Royal Navy until 2002. Initially it was meant to be called Bruiser, but was named Sheffield in honour of the previous Sheffield, a Type 42 destroyer sunk in the Falklands War. In 2003, the vessel was acquired by the Chilean Navy and renamed Almirante Williams.

== History ==
Sheffield was launched on 26 March 1986, by Swan Hunter, Tyne and Wear, United Kingdom, and named by Mrs Susan Stanley, wife of the then Armed Forces Minister. The ship was commissioned at Hull on 26 July 1988. Several crewmen of the previous Sheffield were at the launch. A specially minted Sheffield coin was placed in the keel at the keel-laying ceremony on 29 March 1984.

In late 1998, Sheffield provided assistance after Hurricane Georges, visiting the island of St Kitts and also saved a Honduran woman who had been swept out to sea from her home by the force of Hurricane Mitch.

Sheffield attended the August Bank Holiday 28–30 August 1999 Navy Days at HMNB Devonport, berthed with Sutherland, Somerset, Monmouth, Montrose, Manchester, Illustrious, Campbeltown, Trafalgar, Triumph and RFA Argus.

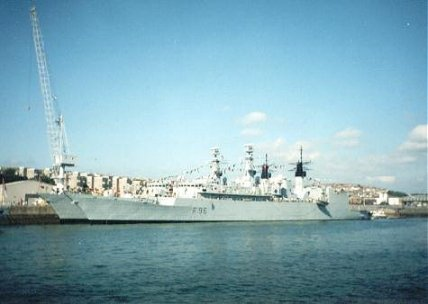
Sheffield at HMNB Devonport Navy day, 1999.

May 2000 saw Sheffield deployed on an eight-week deployment into the Baltic Sea, which included a two-week BALTOPS 2000 – France, Germany, Sweden, Denmark, United States, Poland, Estonia, Lithuania, Latvia and the Netherlands all contributed ships to the exercise, which involved aspects of search and rescue as well as military joint exercises. Sheffield later visited Kiel, then Gdynia, the Twin city of Plymouth, with the Lord Mayor of Plymouth before visiting St. Petersburg in Russia. Sheffield visited Kotka in Finland before Klaipėda in Lithuania, as the first major British warship to visit the city. Sheffield returned home on 26 July.

8 February 2001 saw Sheffield, under Commander Simon Williams, deployed to the Caribbean for a six-month deployment. Sheffield was deployed to assist the United States Coast Guard, Dutch, French and Venezuelan navies in anti-drug operations and exercises. There were visits to the US as well as Barbados, Trinidad, Antigua, St Lucia, Curaçao and the Bahamas. Sheffield took part in Exercise Tradewinds, which promoted interoperability between coastguards and law enforcement agencies in the area. Other ships in the exercise included TTS Nelson and RFA Gold Rover.

5 February 2002 saw Sheffield deployed to the Standing Naval Force Mediterranean to replace Chatham. The mission was anti-terrorism by monitoring merchant shipping. There were also visits to Turkey, Sicily, Crete, Spain and Algiers. Sheffield was the flagship of Commodore Angus Somerville. Tuesday 26 February saw Sheffield assist the Spanish submarine Siroco, whilst participating in the exercise DOGFISH 2002. The submarine needed medicines for a sailor whilst in the Ionian Sea.

On 11 October 2002 Sheffield visited Kingston upon Hull one last time so that she could be visited by the people of her namesake city of Sheffield.

Sheffield was decommissioned on 4 November 2002. After 14 years service, which included providing humanitarian assistance to Nicaragua and Honduras after Hurricane Mitch (which earned her the Wilkinson Sword of Peace along with Ocean), the Strategic Defence Review of 1998 (updated 2001) saw the end of her career with the Royal Navy.

== Chilean service ==
Sheffield was acquired by Chile on 5 September 2003 and renamed Almirante Williams in honour of Vice Admiral Juan Williams Rebolledo, who was Commander of the Chilean Fleet at the beginning of the War of the Pacific.

Since its commissioning, Williams has served as part of the Chilean Fleet, where after various modernization projects carried out in the country, it serves as the flagship of this naval force.

She received a major refit in 2008, which saw her weapons fit change to:

- 1 × 76mm gun
- 2 × 20mm Oerlikon cannon
- 8 × Harpoon anti-ship missiles
- 2 × Barak 1 point defence systems
- 2 × triple 324mm ASW torpedo tubes
- Embarkation of 1 × SH-32 Cougar ASW helicopter

The new equipment was retrieved from decommissioned County-class destroyers.

The main roles of this unit, with its base port in Valparaíso, are the search and attack of submarines, surface combat and support in the event of catastrophes and emergencies. It also has the capacity to transport a Cougar helicopter.
