= ARA Hércules (B-52) =

Former Type 42 destroyer of the Argentine Navy

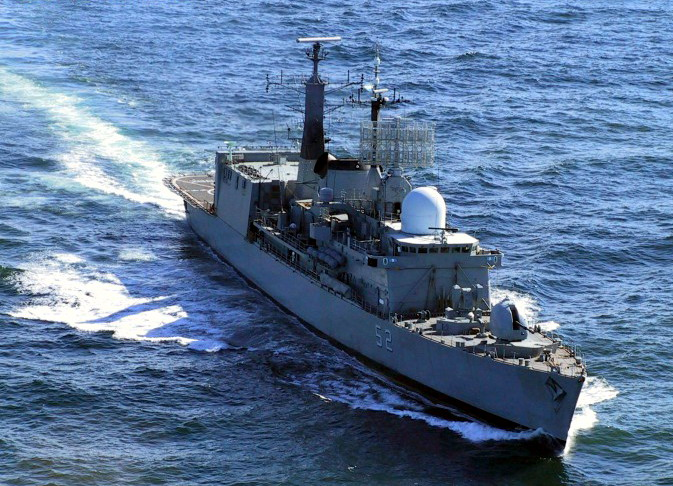
- ARA Hércules after her conversion

History

Argentina
- Name: Hércules
- Namesake: After a frigate commanded by Admiral Guillermo Brown in 1814
- Ordered: 18 May 1970
- Builder: Vickers Shipbuilding and Engineering
- Laid down: 16 June 1971
- Launched: 24 October 1972
- Acquired: 10 May 1976
- Commissioned: 12 July 1976
- Decommissioned: 25 June 2024
- Reclassified: 1999
- Home port: Puerto Belgrano Naval Base
- Identification: B-52
- Status: Decommissioned

General characteristics
- Class & type: Type 42 destroyer
- Displacement: 4,100 tons (4,170 t)
- Length: 125 m (410 ft)
- Beam: 14.6 m (48 ft)
- Draught: 5.2 m (17 ft)
- Propulsion: COGAG: 2 × RM-1A gas turbines 8,200 shp (6,100 kW); 2 × TM-3B gas turbines 54,400 shp (40,600 kW); 2 shafts
- Speed: 28 knots (52 km/h)
- Complement: 270 as destroyer; 166 (+238 troops) as multipurpose transport
- Armament: As destroyer; 1 × 4.5-inch (114 mm) DP gun; 1 × 2 Sea Dart anti-aircraft missiles; 4 × MM38 Exocet anti-ship missiles; 2 × 20mm anti-aircraft (AA) guns; 6 × 12.75-inch (324 mm) torpedo tubes; As multipurpose transport; 1 × 4.5-inch DP gun; 2 × 20 mm AA guns; 6 × 12.75-inch torpedo tubes
- Aircraft carried: As destroyer; 1 SA-319B Alouette III; As multipurpose transport; 2 × Sikorsky SH-3 Sea King

ARA Hércules was a Type 42 destroyer of the Argentine Navy (Spanish: Armada de la República Argentina), which was transformed in 1999 into a multi-purpose transport ship with the pennant number B-52 (previously D-1) and assigned to the amphibious force. She was formally decommissioned in 2024 after having been non-operational for several years.

== History ==
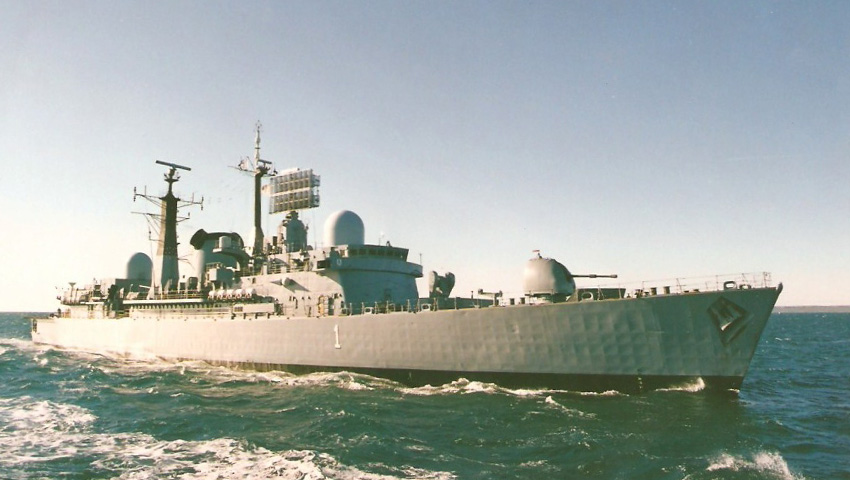
Hércules in her original configuration

The ship was ordered on 18 May 1970 and completed on 10 May 1976 at the Vickers Shipbuilding yard in Barrow-in-Furness, United Kingdom. During construction, an explosion on HMS Sheffield caused damage to its hull. The hull of Hércules replaced a section of the ship, as both were identical in build. She was delivered to Argentina and entered service on 19 September 1977. As built, Hércules was identical to the initial Type 42 units commissioned by the Royal Navy. The Argentine Navy enhanced her offensive capabilities with MM-38 Exocet anti-ship missiles. The original boat decks by the funnel were modified in order to mount the launchers.

In 1982, along with her newly built sister ship, Santísima Trinidad, Hércules was part of the escort of the aircraft carrier Veinticinco de Mayo during the Falklands War.

The ship had a major conversion at ASMAR in Talcahuano, Chile in 2000 that removed the anti-aircraft and anti-ship missile systems to allow for the embarkation of 238 marine infantry. The flight deck and hangar were also enlarged to allow her to operate two Sea King helicopters. Each helicopter could carry two AM-39 Exocet anti-ship missiles.

As of 2020, Hércules was reported to be non-operational. She was formally decommissioned in 2024.

== See also ==
- List of ships of the Argentine Navy
- List of auxiliary ships of the Argentine Navy
