= ARA Santísima Trinidad (D-2) =

Former type 42 destroyer of the Argentine Navy

History

Argentina
- Name: Santísima Trinidad
- Namesake: After a brigantine commanded by Admiral Guillermo Brown in 1815
- Ordered: 18 May 1970
- Builder: AFNE Rio Santiago
- Laid down: 11 October 1971
- Launched: 9 November 1974
- Commissioned: 1 July 1981
- Out of service: 1989
- Home port: Puerto Belgrano naval base
- Fate: Sank in harbour in 2013 due to lack of maintenance, later refloated. Scrapped 2025.

General characteristics
- Class & type: Type 42 destroyer
- Displacement: 4,100 tons
- Length: 125 m (410 ft)
- Beam: 14.6 m (48 ft)
- Draught: 5.2 m (17 ft)
- Propulsion: COGAG – 2 × RM-1A gas turbines 8,200 shp (6,100 kW); 2 × TM-3B gas turbines 54,400 shp (40,600 kW); 2 shafts
- Speed: 28 knots (52 km/h)
- Complement: 270
- Armament: 1 × 4.5-inch (114 mm) DP gun; 1 × 2 Sea Dart; Capabilities for 4 × MM38 Exocet; 2 × 20mm anti-aircraft guns; 6 × 12.75-inch (324 mm) torpedo tubes
- Aircraft carried: 1 x Westland Lynx

ARA Santísima Trinidad ("Most Holy Trinity") was a Type 42 destroyer of the Argentine Navy, the only one of her class built outside Britain. She participated in the 1982 Falklands War. In January 2013 the ship capsized and sank at her moorings in the Argentine naval base of Puerto Belgrano due to lack of maintenance, being refloated in December 2015. The navy's plan to turn her into a museum ship was not realised and, in 2020, the Argentine president stated that the ship should be scrapped, though this was later blocked by federal courts. In July 2025 however, photos appeared online of the ship being scrapped.

== Construction and trials ==
The destroyer was built at the Argentine AFNE Río Santiago shipyard, supported by engineers and technicians from the UK, and commissioned in October 1980.

=== Sabotage ===
Construction began in 1973, but commissioning was long delayed by an improvised limpet mine attack carried out by divers of the guerrilla organization Montoneros on 22 August 1975. The date was chosen as a retaliation for the Trelew massacre three years before, when a number of leftist militants, most of them from the People's Revolutionary Army (ERP), were executed inside Almirante Zar air base, operated by the navy. The raid was allegedly planned in imitation of Operation Frankton, a British commando attack against German shipping at Bordeaux during World War II. The attack involved the use of a folding boat, frogmen and a limpet mine with 375 lb (170 kg) of explosives, which was laid on the river bed below the destroyer after a failed attempt to attach the device to the hull. The ship's bottom and electronics suffered severe damage, and completion was suspended for a year as a result of the attack.

=== Commissioning ===
The Argentine Navy enhanced the offensive capabilities of their Type 42s by fitting MM-38 Exocet missiles. The boat decks of the original design were replaced by special decks to install the missiles around the funnel, but the launchers were apparently never mounted on Santísima Trinidad. In April 1981 she made her maiden voyage to Britain, where the destroyer carried out her first sea trials, and her crew was trained in the operation and launching of Sea Dart missiles. She returned to Argentina in December 1981 having successfully completed all training and trials.

== Operational history ==
=== Falklands War ===
==== Argentine Landings ====
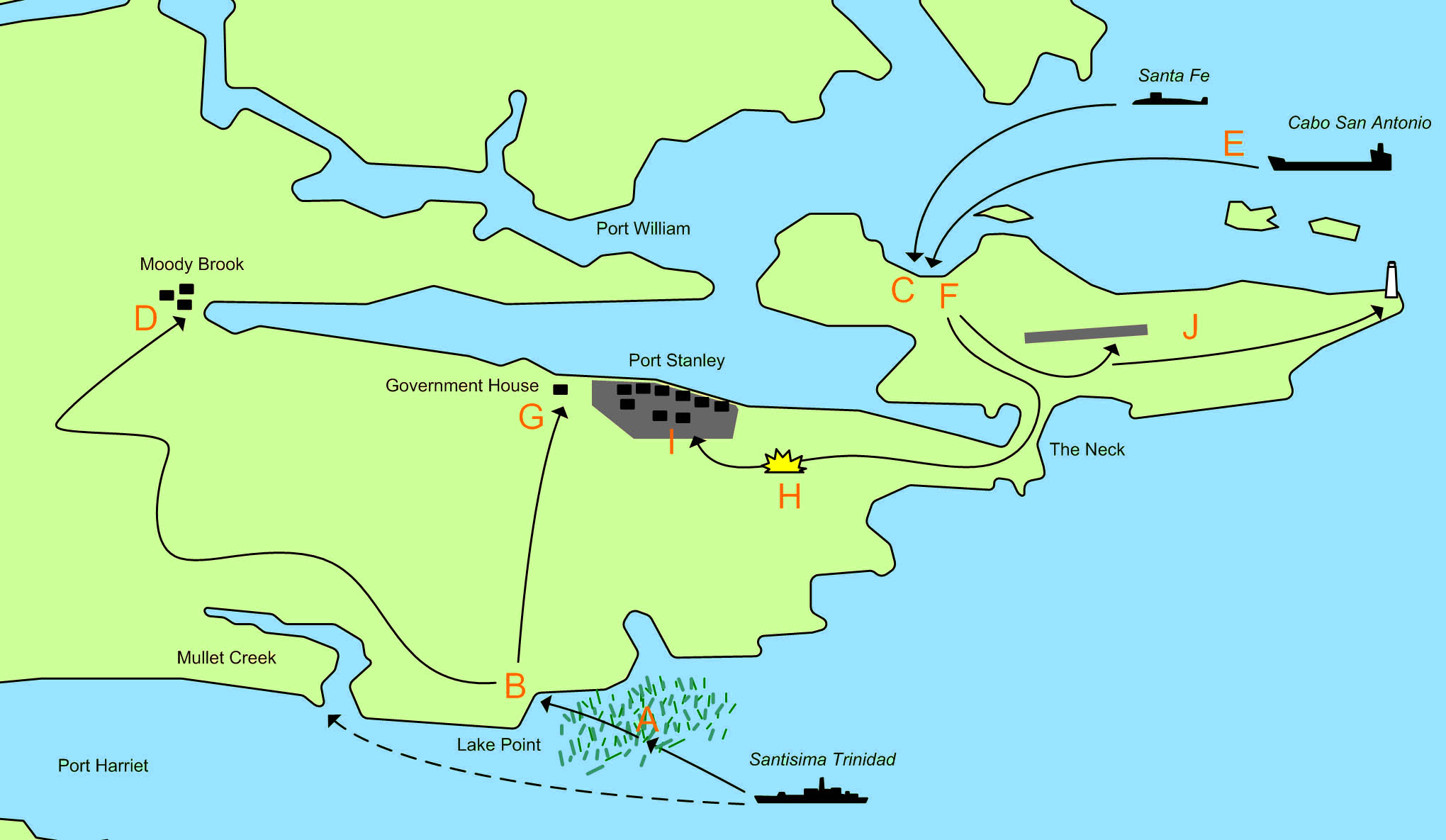
Map showing position of Santísima Trinidad during the landings

Santísima Trinidad was the leading ship of the Argentine landings on the Falklands on 2 April 1982. Both the navy and the army commanders of the operation were on board. A team of 84 amphibious commandos and 8 tactical divers landed at Mullet Creek at midnight in 21 Gemini boats lowered from her deck. The wireless message demanding the surrender of the British Governor, Rex Hunt (governor), along with the Royal Marines detachment on the islands was also radioed from the destroyer.

==== Sea Harrier incident ====
During the remainder of the Falklands War, along with her sister ship Hércules, the unit served as the main escort to the aircraft carrier Veinticinco de Mayo. At first Hércules operated independently along with a group of older destroyers, but the development of mechanical problems in her sister ship forced the Argentine commander to merge the two Type 42 destroyers into one escorting force. The carrier naval group was known as Grupo de Tareas 79.1 (Task Force 79.1), and was intended to search for and engage its British counterpart from waters north of the Falklands. Santísima Trinidad was responsible for the command and control of the group's air defence.

Late on 1 May, the carrier launched a number of S-2 Tracker surveillance aircraft, with the aim of finding the British Task Group. One of the Tracker's crews radioed that they were being chased by an unknown jet while returning to Veinticinco de Mayo. Shortly after midnight, Santísima Trinidad was ordered to switch her Type 965 radar on and track the unidentified contact. She then locked onto a Sea Harrier with her Type 909 fire-control radar, followed afterwards by her sister-ship Hércules. The British aircraft, Sea Harrier XZ451 piloted by Flight Lieutenant Ian Mortimer of 801 Naval Air Squadron, retreated because of the threat of the Sea Dart, but not before spotting the area of deployment of the Argentine fleet. After realising that the enemy was not engaged in a major amphibious operation as supposed, which made any attempt of the Argentine against the British carriers extremely dangerous, the Argentine commander, Admiral Allara, decided to withdraw his forces to shallow waters close to the coast.

==== Coastal surveillance ====
The destroyer lost her Lynx helicopter on 4 May when the aircraft hit her flight-deck as the Argentine fleet was redeploying. She spent the next few days in dry dock to repair the mechanical problems which reduced her speed during the operations of 1 May. In the following weeks, Santísima Trinidad was engaged in patrol duties off Patagonia. During the Air Force attacks on Bluff Cove on 8 June, Santísima Trinidad played a key role by jamming the frequencies used by the Sea Harriers air controllers with interference signals. Once the end of hostilities was declared, Santísima Trinidad escorted the British transport Canberra into Puerto Madryn with about 3,000 Argentine prisoners on board.

=== After the war ===
After the war the British weapons and supplies embargo on Argentina made the purchase of spare parts impossible. The Argentine Minister of Defence considered selling the destroyers, and as a consequence, the Navy placed Santísima Trinidad in reserve as a parts supplier for Hércules. From 2 to 15 March 1987 she took part in Operation Grifo, the Argentine response to Operation Fire-Focus, the largest British military exercise around the Falklands since 1982. Her last Sea Dart missile test launch was conducted on 27 November 1987 against an Argentine-built drone. Santísima Trinidad's last voyage took place in 1989.

== Fate ==
Since 2004, Santísima Trinidad was listed as "in reserve awaiting overhaul", but it was expected that the navy would formally decommission her. There were projects in the Argentine congress calling for Santísima Trinidad to be converted into a museum ship.

On 21 January 2013, Santísima Trinidad suffered a broken valve which resulted in the flooding of several compartments. The flooding was beyond the capacity of the pumps and the crew was evacuated. The ship took on a 50-degree list and then sank at her berth in Puerto Belgrano. Santísima Trinidad was in poor condition before she sank; the ship had been cannibalized to keep her sister Hércules operational, as the British refused to sell spare parts to Argentina after the Falklands War. In September 2014, specialists of the Argentine navy began an operation to raise the ship. In December 2015, Santísima Trinidad was refloated and the Navy announced their plan to turn her into a museum dedicated to the 1982 war. This project seemed to have been discarded by 2018. The Argentine president decreed on 17 December 2020 that the ship should be placed out of use and disposed of.

In December 2021, an Argentine federal court ruled that the ship cannot be scrapped due to her historical significance and can qualify for status as a national historic site. In July 2025 however, photos appeared online of the ship being broken down.

== See also ==
- List of ships of the Argentine Navy
