= HMS Glasgow (D88) =

Destroyer of the Royal Navy

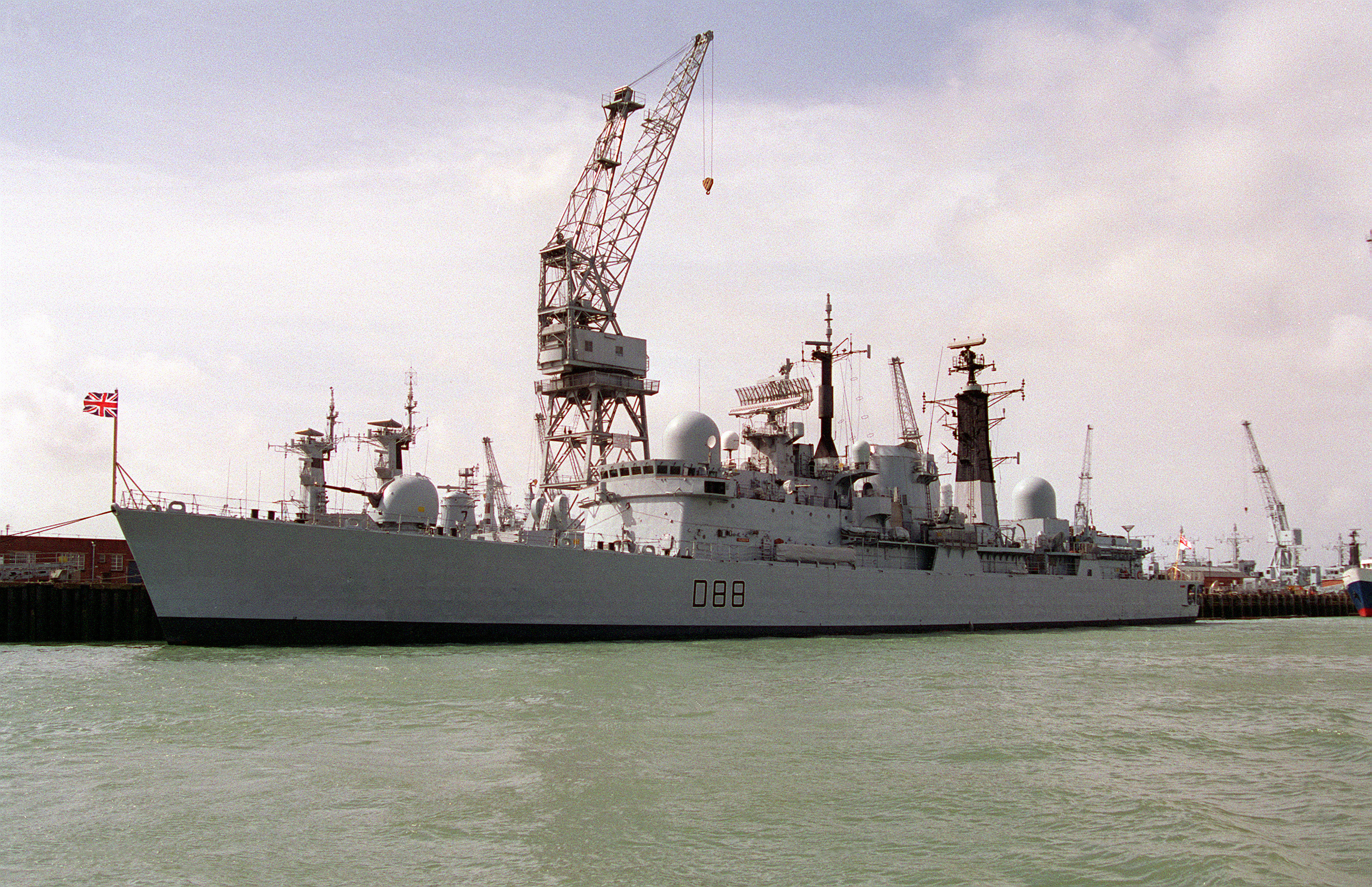
- HMS Glasgow in 1994

History

United Kingdom
- Name: HMS Glasgow
- Builder: Swan Hunter, Tyne and Wear, United Kingdom
- Laid down: 16 May 1974
- Launched: 14 April 1976
- Commissioned: 25 May 1979
- Decommissioned: 1 February 2005
- Home port: Rosyth / Portsmouth
- Identification: Pennant number: D88; IMO number: 4907012
- Motto: Memor Es Tuorum (Be mindful of your ancestors)
- Fate: Scrapped 2009

General characteristics
- Class & type: Type 42 destroyer
- Displacement: 4,820 tonnes
- Length: 125 m (410 ft)
- Beam: 14.3 m (47 ft)
- Draught: 5.8 m (19 ft)
- Propulsion: Combined gas or gas (COGOG) turbines, 2 shafts; 2 × Olympus TM3B; 2 × Tyne
- Speed: 30 knots (56 km/h; 35 mph)
- Complement: 287
- Armament: Sea Dart surface-to-air missile twin-arm launcher; 1 × 4.5 inch (114 mm) Mk 8 gun; 2 × Phalanx 20 mm (from 1989); 2 × Oerlikon 20 mm; 2 × STWS Mk 2 triple torpedo tubes
- Aircraft carried: Lynx HMA8
- Aviation facilities: Flight deck and enclosed hangar for embarking one helicopter

HMS Glasgow was a Type 42 destroyer of the Royal Navy. The last of the Batch 1 Type 42 destroyers, Glasgow was commissioned in 1979. The destroyer fought during the Falklands War, and on 12 May 1982 was damaged by a bomb from an Argentine A-4 Skyhawk. Glasgow was part of the Royal Navy’s 3rd Destroyer Squadron along with HMS York (Captain D3), HMS Edinburgh and HMS Liverpool. The 3rd Destroyer Squadron was based in Rosyth during the 1980s and early 1990s before being moved to Portsmouth when Rosyth Dockyard was privatised and re-purposed. The destroyer was decommissioned in 2005 and was broken up for scrap in 2009.

== Design and construction ==
She was built at Swan Hunter Shipyard in Wallsend, Tyneside, and launched on 14 April 1976 by Lady Kirstie Treacher, wife of Admiral Sir John Treacher. With a displacement of 4,820 tonnes, Glasgow was the sixth and last Batch 1 Type 42 destroyer in the fleet. Named after the Scottish city of Glasgow, she was the eighth ship to bear the name. On 23 September 1976, while being fitted out, a fire on board killed eight men and injured a further six. The ship was commissioned into the Royal Navy on 25 May 1979.

See below design drawings of HMS Glasgow in 1982 and 1992, the latter showing weapons and sensor upgrades following a major refit in Rosyth 1988-89.

== Operational history ==
The ship was rammed by the Soviet cruiser Admiral Isakov on 27 May 1981, while in the Barents Sea collecting information on new Soviet equipment.

=== Falklands War ===
Glasgow was among the five Type 42 destroyers which were part of the task force sent to retake the Falkland Islands after invasion by Argentina on 2 April 1982. Armed with the Sea Dart long range anti-aircraft missile system, Glasgow along with her sister ships, Sheffield and Coventry were among the first ships to arrive in a 200-nautical-mile (370 km; 230 mi) exclusion zone imposed by the British around the islands.

Glasgow was deployed towards the South Atlantic direct from Gibraltar, where 18 Royal Navy frigates and destroyers were taking part in "Exercise Spring Train". On Friday 2 April 1982, 8 of the frigates and destroyers (Antrim, Arrow, Brilliant, Coventry, Glamorgan, Glasgow, Plymouth and Sheffield) were ordered by CINCFLEET (Commander-in-Chief Fleet) to "store ship" ready to sail south. The stores, fuel and ammunition required for full operational readiness came from a combination of sources, but mostly from the other ships already in Gibraltar at that time. Using a 'buddy ship' replenishment approach, the ships with less suitable sensor and weapon suites went alongside the deploying ships to transfer stores and ammunition, either by hand or using helicopter vertical replenishment (VERTREP). There were also a number of crew exchanges between the ships deploying and ships returning to the UK i.e. juniors under 17.5 years or crew with other compassionate and operational situations.

Glasgow saw action early in the war when, on 2 May, her Lynx helicopter severely damaged the Argentine naval vessel Alferez Sobral. On 4 May, Glasgow detected an Exocet missile fired at the task force and warned the fleet. However Sheffield failed to receive the warning and was hit, later sinking. Down to two Type 42s (Exeter and Cardiff would not arrive until the end of May), Glasgow and Coventry were left as the long-range defence of the fleet.

Following the loss of Sheffield, a new air defence tactic was devised to try to maximise the task group's remaining assets; the two remaining Type 42 destroyers paired up with the two Type 22 frigates. The pairs were then deployed much further ahead of the main force in an effort to draw attacking aircraft away from the carrier groups. The idea was that if Sea Dart was unable to neutralise the threat, the short-range Sea Wolf advanced point-defence missile fitted to the frigates could be used. Coventry was paired with Broadsword and Glasgow paired with Brilliant. This combination of ships created a long-range (30 nmi), short-range guided missile capability along with shore bombardment or naval gunfire support (NGS) using the Type 42's 4.5-inch guns (range 12 nmi).

This picketing tactic was effective in drawing Argentine aircraft attacks away from the carrier groups and moderately effective in drawing them away from San Carlos Bay. The pairs would take turns positioning themselves closer to the islands, shelling Argentinean positions and then waiting for the aircraft to come.

On 12 May, Glasgow and the Type 22 frigate Brilliant were on a "42-22" combo around 15 miles south west of Port Stanley. At 11:00 Glasgow was carrying out shore bombardment of Argentinean positions. Then later in the afternoon a wave of four A-4B Skyhawk jets of Grupo 5 attacked. Glasgow's Sea Dart system and 4.5 inch Mk.8 gun both failed, but Brilliant's Sea Wolf shot down 1st Lieutenant Oscar Bustos (C-246) and Lieutenant Jorge Ibarlucea (C-208), whilst Lieutenant Mario Nivoli (C-206) crashed into the sea evading debris. All three pilots died in the action but were posthumously promoted.

Despite the losses in the first wave, a second wave of Grupo 5 Skyhawks attacked, but Brilliant's Sea Wolf failed and the jets each released three bombs. One bomb from Skyhawk (C-248) piloted by Lieutenant Fausto Gavazzi damaged Glasgow, passing clean through the aft engine room without exploding. It damaged fuel systems and disabled the two Tyne cruising engines. A third wave of aircraft was detected but they did not engage the ships. On his return flight, Lieutenant Gavazzi was shot down by friendly fire over Goose Green and killed. Gavazzi was posthumously promoted to captain for his bravery.

Lieutenant Gavazzi's bomb had hit Glasgow 3 feet above the waterline on the starboard side where damage control teams quickly plugged the hole. The exit hole was much more difficult to access behind machinery and closer to the waterline, so the ship was temporarily patched until it could reach calmer waters. The Glasgow was no longer fully operationally effective due to a limited speed of 10 knots and returned to the main group. On 19 June 1982, Glasgow became the first warship involved in Operation Corporate to return home, and was eventually repaired in Portsmouth Dockyard. Glasgow then came back to the South Atlantic after the end of the war (August 1982) on routine Atlantic Patrol South.

=== Post-war ===
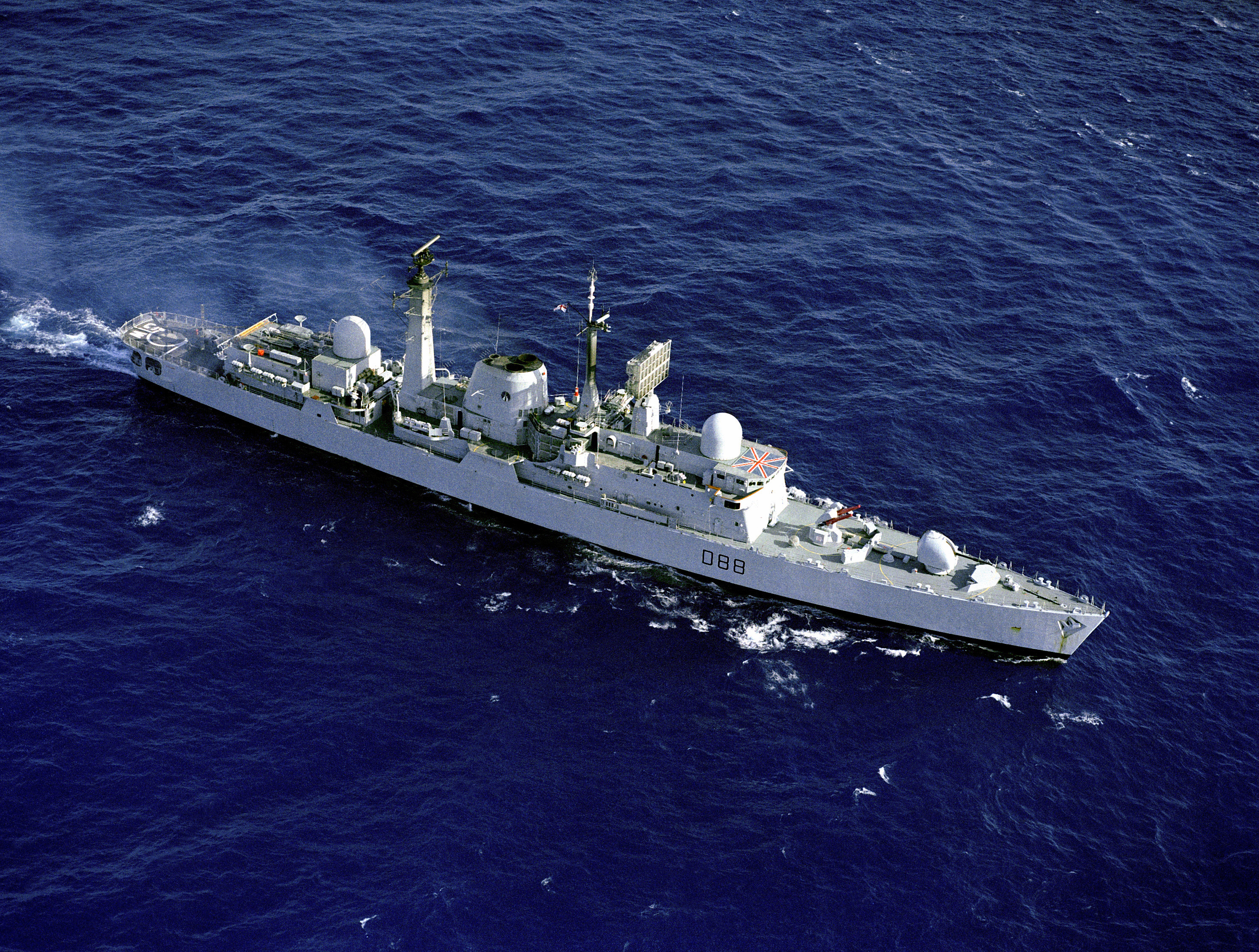
Glasgow in 1983

In later years, Glasgow served on a variety of missions including acting as the West Indies Guard Ship (WIGS) in 1987. Glasgow had a major refit in Rosyth during 1991-92 which included major machinery replacements, weapons and sensor upgrades including replacing her dated 30 mm Oerlikons with 20mm Phalanx. While performing sea trials, issues with the new propulsion system and new radar meant she had to keep returning to port. 1990 saw her calling at New York and Toronto. In 1991, the destroyer deployed to the Persian Gulf on ARMILLA Patrol just after the Gulf War. In 1992, the warship was sent to the Mediterranean for the first time as part of the NATO naval force, STANAVFORMED. Glasgow was deployed to East Timor as part of the Australian-led INTERFET peacekeeping task force from 19 to 29 September 1999. In early 2004, the ship was deployed on the Atlantic Patrol South tasking. Like most Royal Navy Ships, HMS Glasgow maintained a proud and productive relationship with her namesake city of Glasgow; visiting Yorkhill Quay on the River Clyde on several occasions during her commission.

== Decommissioning and fate ==
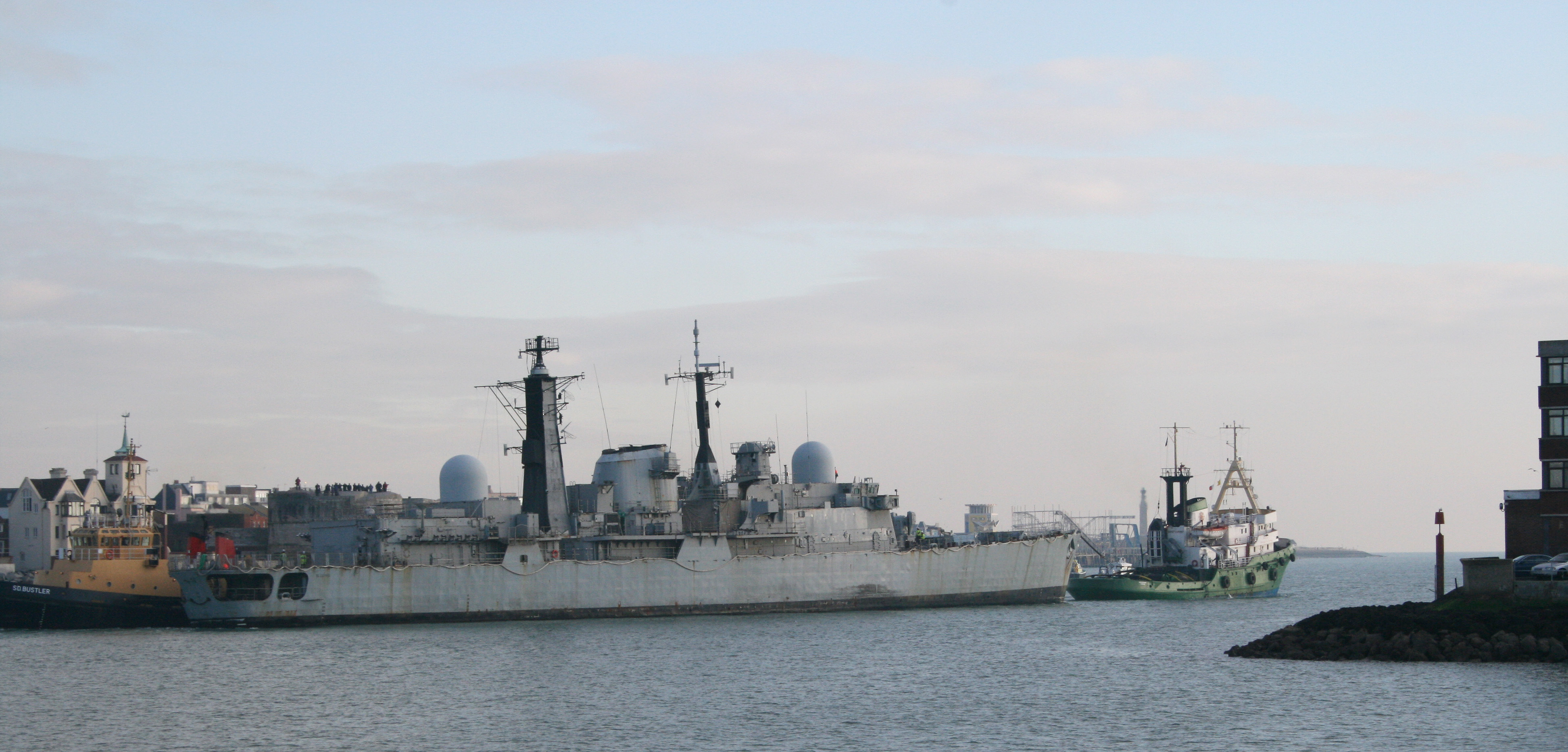
Glasgow leaving HMNB Portsmouth on tow to the breakers

It was announced in July 2004, as part of the Delivering Security in a Changing World review, that Glasgow would be decommissioned in January 2005. Glasgow was formally decommissioned on 1 February 2005. On 7 January 2009 she was towed from Portsmouth to Turkey for breaking up.

== Publications ==
- Colledge, J. J.; Warlow, Ben (2006) [1969]. Ships of the Royal Navy: The Complete Record of All Fighting Ships of the Royal Navy from the 15th Century to the Present (3rd Rev ed.). London: Chatham Publishing. ISBN 978-1-86176-281-8. OCLC 67375475.
