= HMS Manchester (D95) =

Destroyer of the Royal Navy

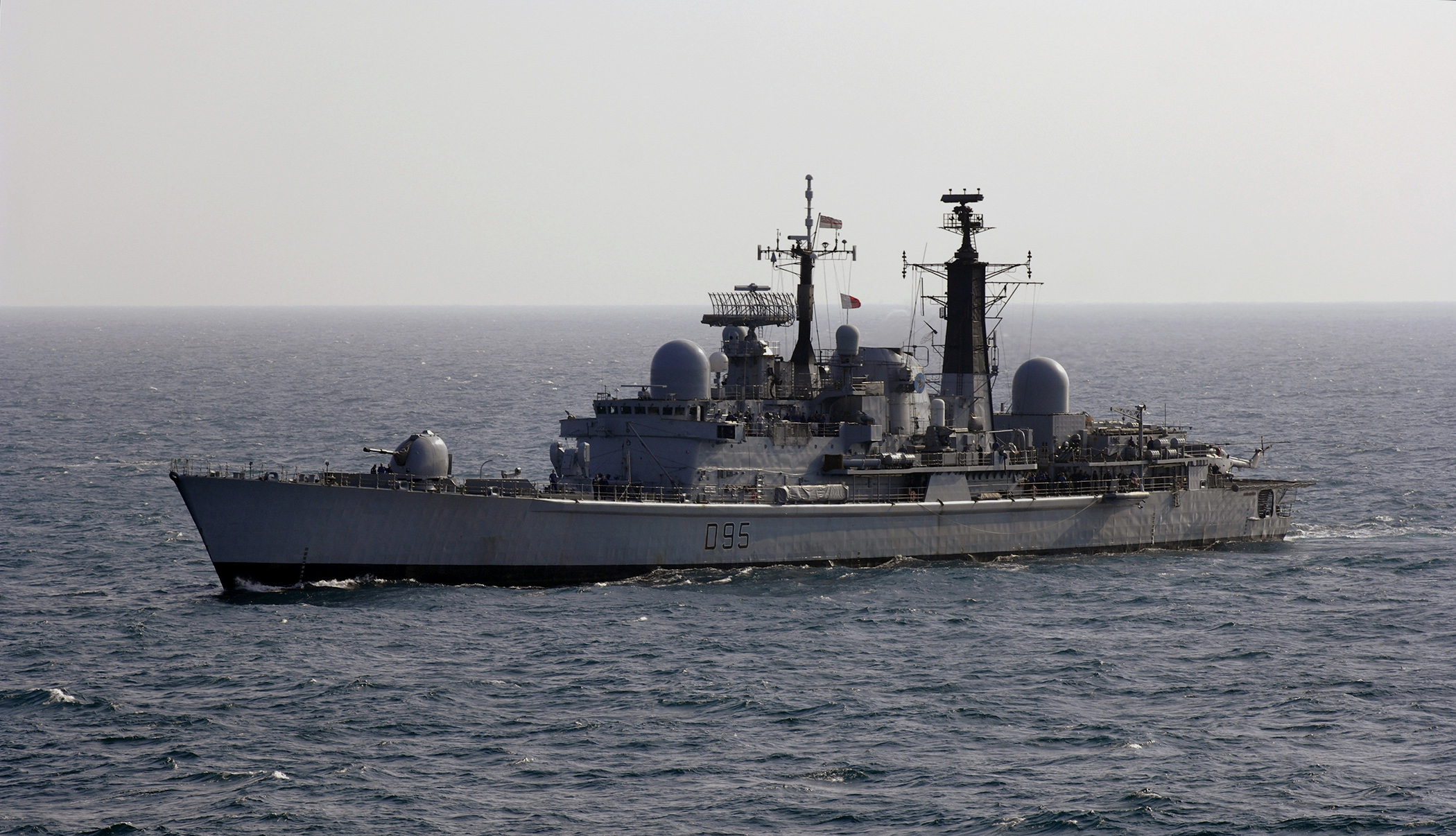
- HMS Manchester, in 2008

History

United Kingdom
- Name: HMS Manchester
- Builder: Vickers
- Laid down: 19 May 1978
- Launched: 24 November 1980
- Commissioned: 16 December 1982
- Decommissioned: 24 February 2011
- Identification: Pennant number D95; IMO number: 4907074
- Motto: Sapere aude; ("Dare to be wise")
- Nickname(s): Busy Bee
- Fate: Scrapped November 2014
- Badge

General characteristics
- Class & type: Type 42 destroyer
- Displacement: 5,200 t (5,118 long tons)
- Length: 141 m (462 ft 7 in)
- Beam: 15.2 m (49 ft 10 in)
- Propulsion: Combined gas or gas (COGOG); 2 × Olympus gas turbines 36 MW (48,000 hp) for high power or 2 × Tyne gas turbines up to 22 kn (41 km/h; 25 mph); 2 shafts
- Speed: 30 knots (56 km/h; 35 mph)
- Complement: 287 (max. 312)
- Armament: Twin Sea Dart missile launcher (total of 22 missiles); 1 × 4.5 inch (113 mm) Mk 8 gun; 2 × 20 mm Oerlikon guns; 2 × Phalanx close-in weapon system (CIWS); NATO Seagnat and DLF3 decoy launchers
- Aircraft carried: 1 × Lynx HMA8 armed with: 4 × anti-ship missiles; 2 × anti-submarine torpedoes

HMS Manchester was a Type 42 (Batch 3) destroyer in the 5th Destroyer Squadron of the United Kingdom's Royal Navy. She was laid down in 1978 at Vickers Shipbuilding and Engineering, launched in 1980, commissioned in 1982, and decommissioned on 24 February 2011.

Her nickname was the "Busy Bee", in reference to the Manchester bee symbol and the bee emblem is also depicted on the ship's crest.

== Construction and design ==
Manchester was laid down on 19 May 1978, (Note: Some sources state that Manchester was laid down on 19 May 1979, which corresponds to a widely stated order date of November 1978.) was launched on 24 November 1980 and commissioned on 16 December 1982.

Manchester was the first of the four Batch 3 Type 42 destroyers. In order to give better seakeeping and ease the cramped conditions on board, the ship's hull was lengthened by 42 feet (12.8 m) compared to the earlier Batch 1 and 2 ships, giving a length at the waterline of 434 feet (132.3 m) and an overall length of 463 feet (141.1 m). Beam was also increased by 2 feet (0.6 m) to 49 feet (14.9 m), while draught was 14 feet (4.2 m) at the ship's keel and 19 feet (5.8 m) to the ship's propellers. Displacement was 4,775 long tons (4,852 t) full load. The ship was powered by two Rolls-Royce Olympus TM3B gas turbines rated at 27,200 shaft horsepower (20,300 kW) each and two Rolls-Royce Tyne RM1C gas turbines of 5,340 shaft horsepower (3,980 kW) in a COGOG arrangement, with a maximum speed of 29.5 knots (54.6 km/h; 33.9 mph) when powered by the Olympus engines and a cruise speed of 18 knots (33 km/h; 21 mph) powered by the Tynes. Range was 4,750 nautical miles (8,800 km; 5,470 mi) at 18 knots (33 km/h; 21 mph).

== Service history ==
=== Early operations ===
HMS Manchester commissioned in 1983 with 50% of her Ship's Company taken from Sheffield and Coventry's survivors. Manchester's first operational deployment was to the Falkland Islands in 1983/84. During the mid-1980s Manchester participated in the Royal Navy's Global 86 tour where a task group, led by Illustrious, was detached to fly the flag in a round the world cruise and series of port visits.

The ship joined the 5th Destroyer Squadron.

In 1988, she saw service on Operation Armilla, in company with the frigates Jupiter (Returned to UK early with mechanical problems) and Beaver. It was whilst on this deployment that the ship was visited by the then UK Prime Minister, Margaret Thatcher, who made a flying visit following her tour of India. The period also coincided with the end of the Iran-Iraq war and shooting down of the Iran Air Flight 655 by the Aegis missile cruiser USS Vincennes on the morning of 4 July 1988.

=== Gulf War ===
In 1991, during the First Gulf War, she participated in numerous operations in the Persian Gulf, aimed at primarily upholding the trade blockade imposed on Iraq during Saddam Hussein's invasion of Kuwait. She won the lineage its newest battle honour - Persian Gulf 1991.

=== Post-Gulf War ===
In February 2000, Manchester was deployed on Atlantic Patrol Tasking (North) to the Caribbean carrying out counter narcotics operations in concert with RFA Grey Rover and USS Deyo and the US LEDET. Port visits included Key West, Barbados, St Vincent, Trinidad, Curaçao, Cartagena, Martinique and New York on her return. Whilst in New York, she was one of several ships hit by the liner Queen Elizabeth 2 whilst berthed alongside the East River.

Manchester returned to the West Indies for second 4-month spell in 2003.

In 2004, Manchester acted in the role of Fleet Ready Escort (FRE). In September Manchester sailed from Portsmouth to take part in Exercise Destiny Glory O4, a large NATO exercise in the Mediterranean, as part of an RN naval task force consisting of Invincible, Southampton and the Royal Fleet Auxiliary Fort George. During the deployment Manchester visited a number of ports in the Mediterranean.

In the autumn of 2005, Manchester was deployed in the Mediterranean as part of a NATO task force. During the four-month deployment she was employed in a counter terrorist role alongside other European and American ships.

From 27 to 30 July 2009, Manchester travelled to Bermuda to help celebrate the British Overseas Territory's 400th anniversary. The crew took part in a historical re-enactment of the wrecking of the sailing ship Sea Venture on 28 July 1609, which was en route as a rescue supply ship to British colonialists in Virginia at the time.

During this tour, she also visited the Falkland Islands, Brazil and Colombia and spent time in Cape Verde for counter-narcotics training with the local coastguard. However upon her return to Britain a junior rating was alleged to have attempted to smuggle 12 kilograms of cocaine in bags in her personal quarters.

In 2010 Manchester was on a seven-month deployment to the Caribbean, mainly on counter-drug operations and a display of security to Britain's Overseas Territories in the region. On 15 November 2010, Manchester became the first British warship to visit Havana, Cuba, since Bigbury Bay in 1957. Her officers discussed co-operation with the Cuban Navy on counter-drug-trafficking and disaster relief operations in the region. Manchester's visit to Cuba supposedly paved the way for the thawing of US-Cuba relations. This deployment ended in December 2010 and culminated in a £19 million drug bust. Her Caribbean deployment was also the subject of a Channel 5 documentary series entitled Royal Navy Caribbean Patrol broadcast from 7 February 2011 onwards.

On 2 February 2011, Manchester berthed at Liverpool, England, as the city was the nearest to Manchester, the city of her affiliation. The crew hosted a civic reception onboard before parading through the city for their final freedom of the city parade.

== Fate ==
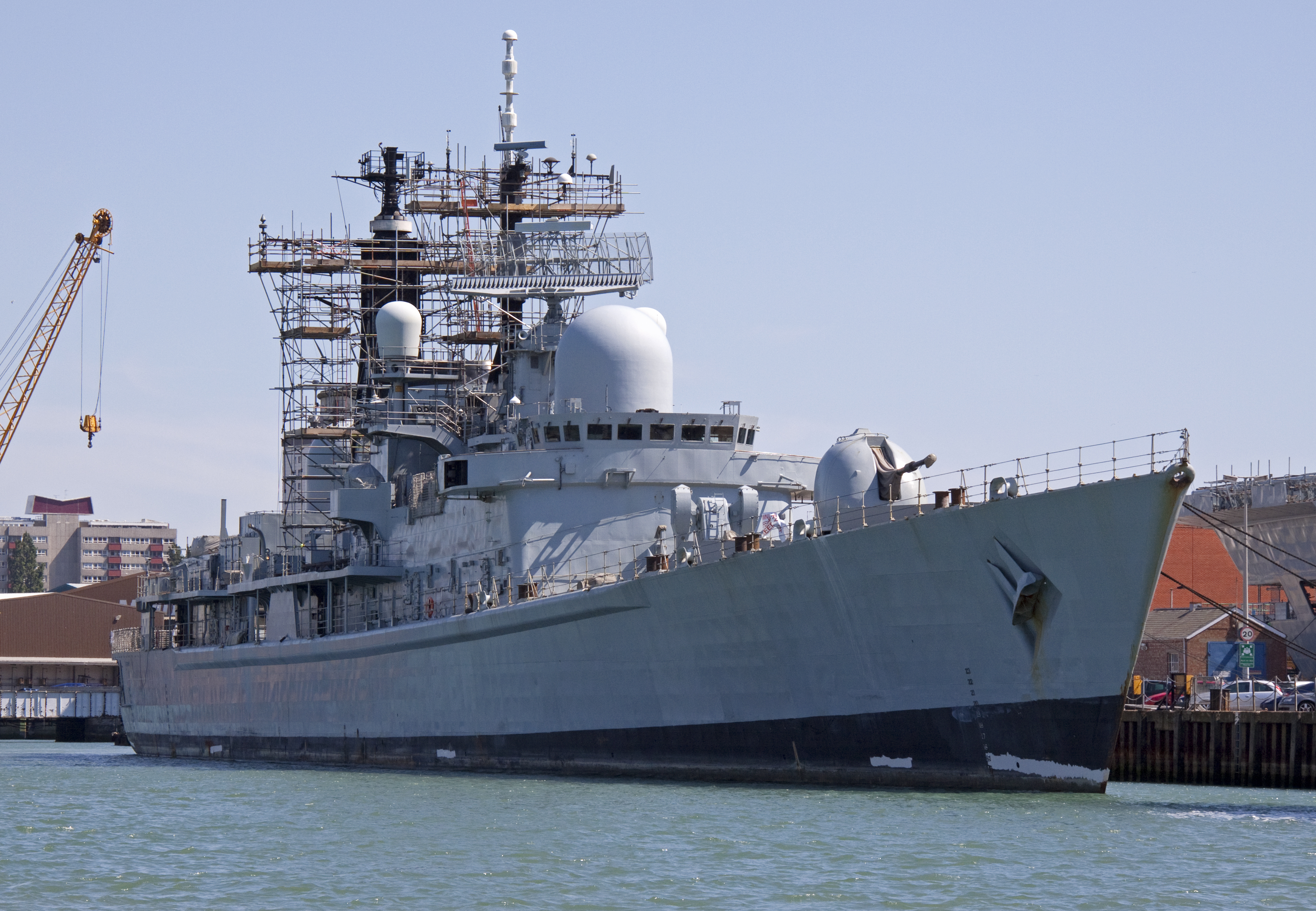
Manchester being decommissioned in May 2011 at HMNB Portsmouth

On 21 February 2011, Manchester sailed into her home port of HMNB Portsmouth where she was decommissioned on 24 February 2011.

== Affiliations ==
- The Duke of Lancaster's Regiment (King's, Lancashire and Border)
- Worshipful Company of World Traders
- Manchester City F.C.
- Sale R.F.C.
- Manchester Trafalgar Sea Cadets

== Gallery ==
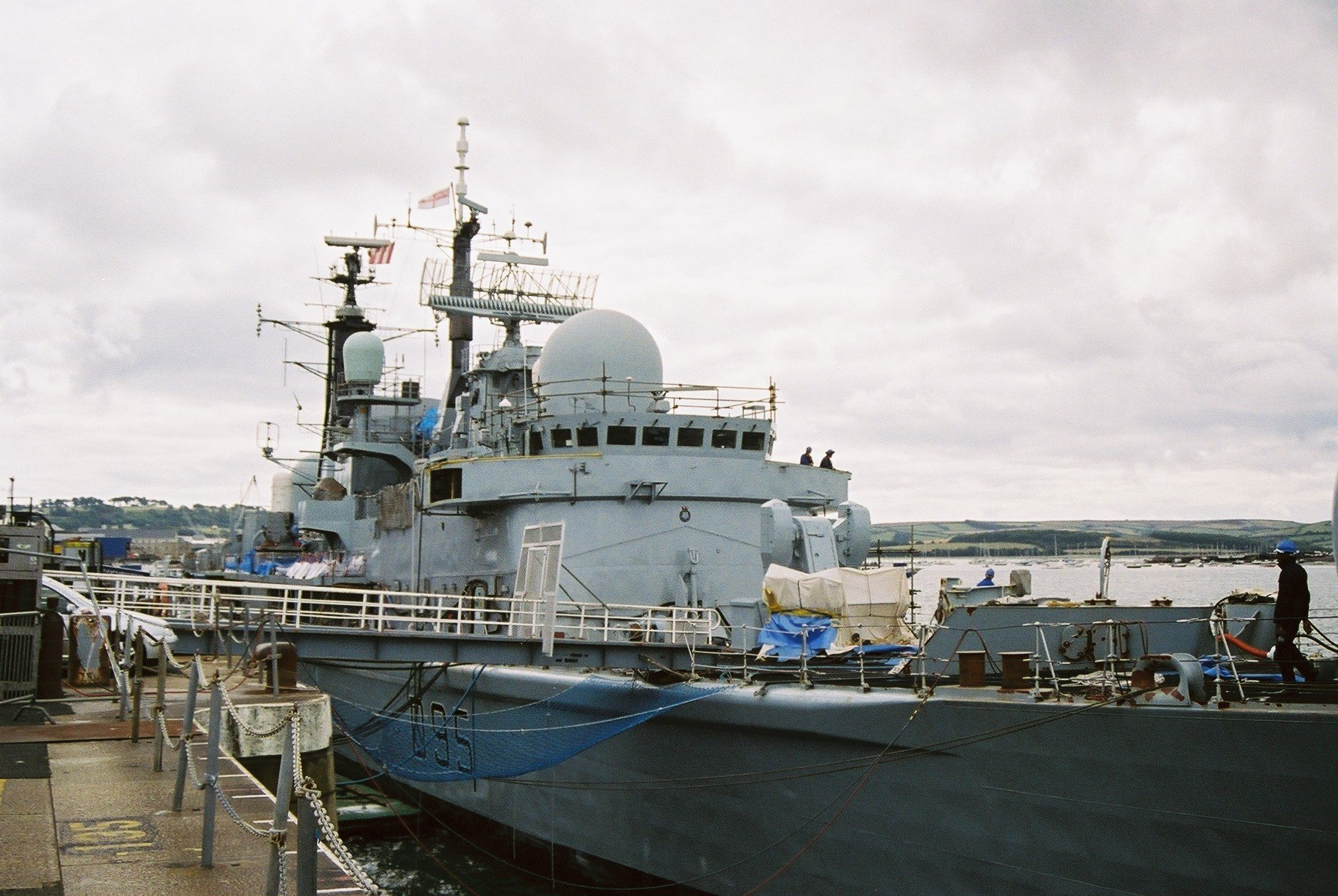
Manchester at HMNB Devonport Navy Days 2006 undergoing refit

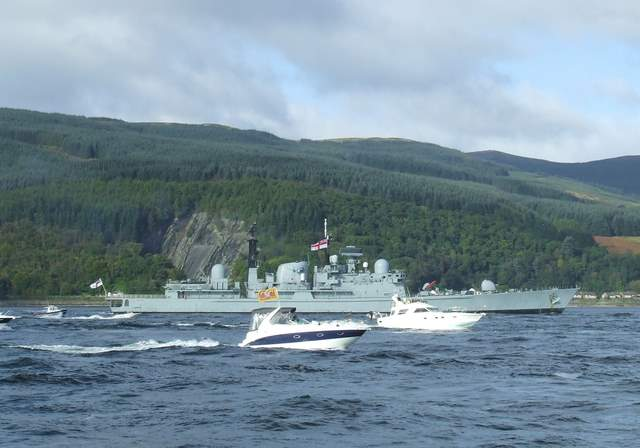
Manchester on the River Clyde in 2008

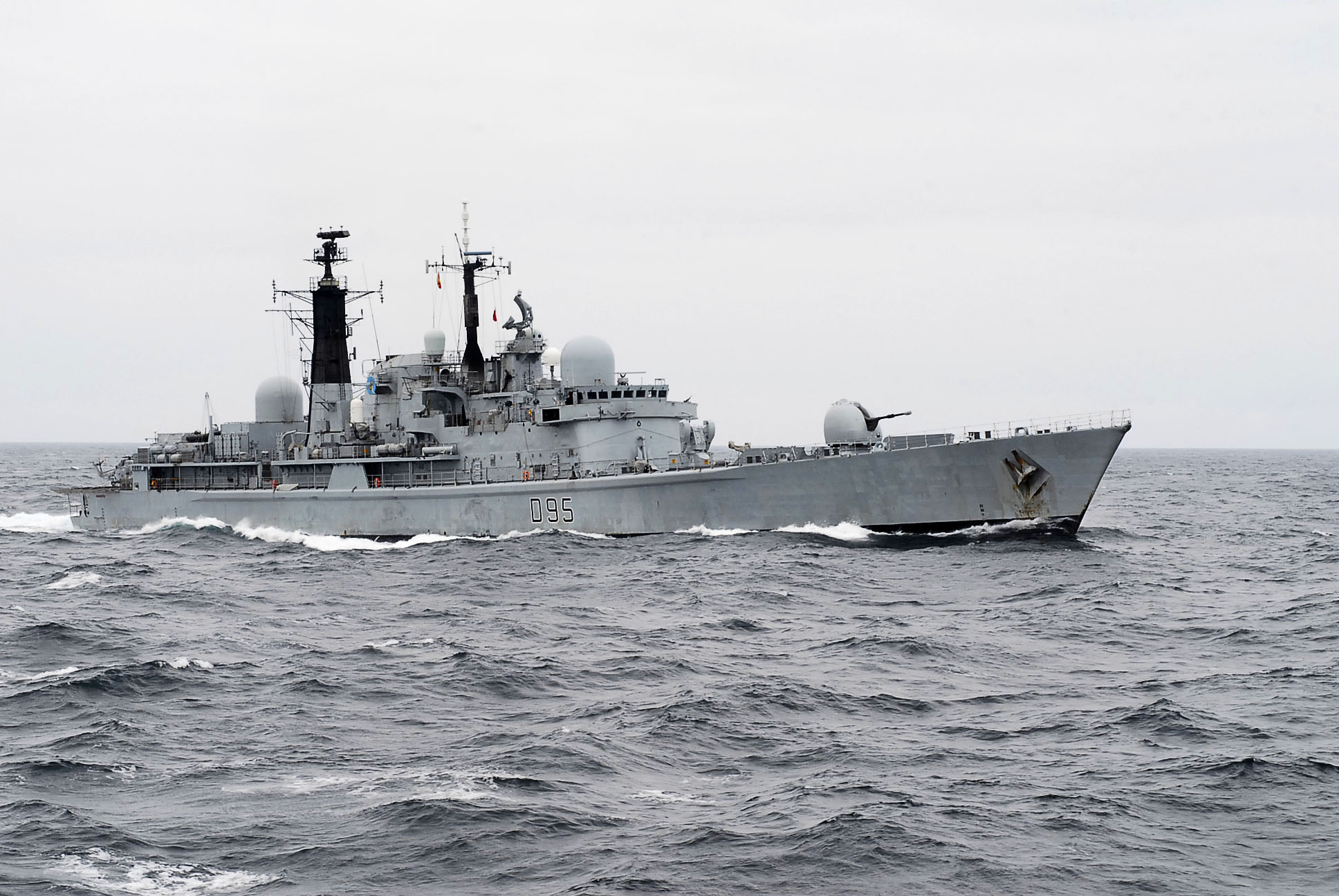
