= HMS Sheffield (D80) =

Type 42 destroyer

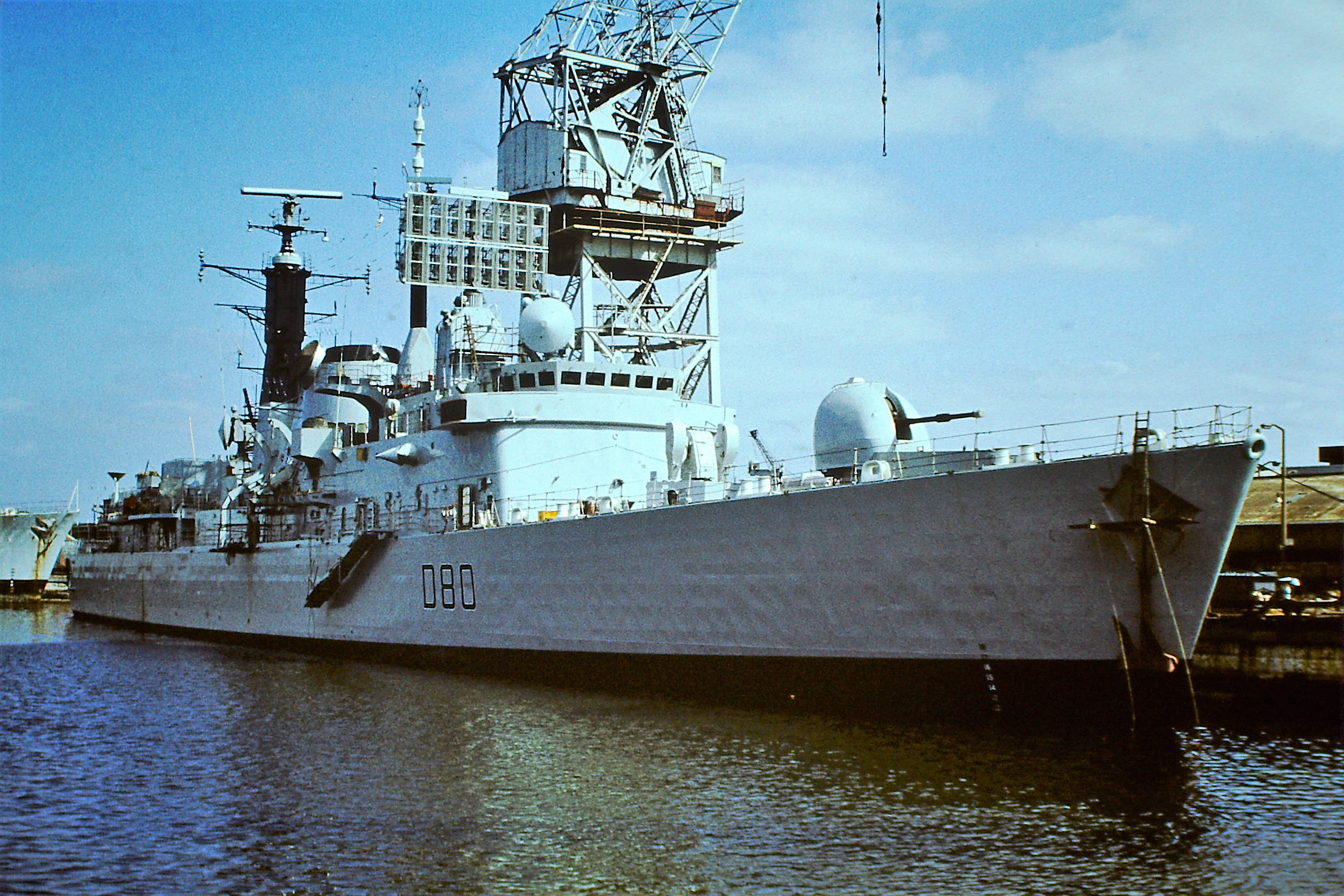
- HMS Sheffield

History

United Kingdom
- Name: HMS Sheffield
- Ordered: 14 November 1968
- Builder: Vickers Shipbuilding and Engineering Ltd
- Laid down: 15 January 1970
- Launched: 10 June 1971
- Sponsored by: Queen Elizabeth II
- Commissioned: 16 February 1975
- Identification: Pennant number: D80
- Motto: Deo Adjuvante Labor Proficit; (Latin: "With God's help our labour is successful")
- Nickname(s): Shiny Sheff
- Fate: Sunk under tow on 10 May 1982 following Argentine missile attack and subsequent fire

General characteristics
- Class & type: Type 42 destroyer
- Displacement: 4,820 tonnes
- Length: 125 m (410 ft 1 in)
- Beam: 14.3 m (46 ft 11 in)
- Draught: 5.8 m (19 ft 0 in)
- Propulsion: 4 Rolls-Royce (2 Olympus TM3B and 2 Tyne) producing 36 MW COGOG (combined gas or gas) arrangement
- Speed: 30 knots (56 km/h; 35 mph)
- Complement: 21 officers and 249 ratings
- Armament: 2 × Sea Dart surface-to-air missile launcher; 1 × 4.5-inch (114 mm) Mk.8 gun
- Aircraft carried: Lynx HAS1

HMS Sheffield was a Type 42-class guided missile destroyer and the second Royal Navy ship to be named after the city of Sheffield in Yorkshire. Commissioned on 16 February 1975 the Sheffield was part of the Task Force 317 sent to the Falkland Islands during the Falklands War. She was struck and heavily damaged by an Exocet air-launched anti-ship missile from an Argentine Super Étendard aircraft on 4 May 1982 and foundered while under tow on 10 May 1982.

== Design ==
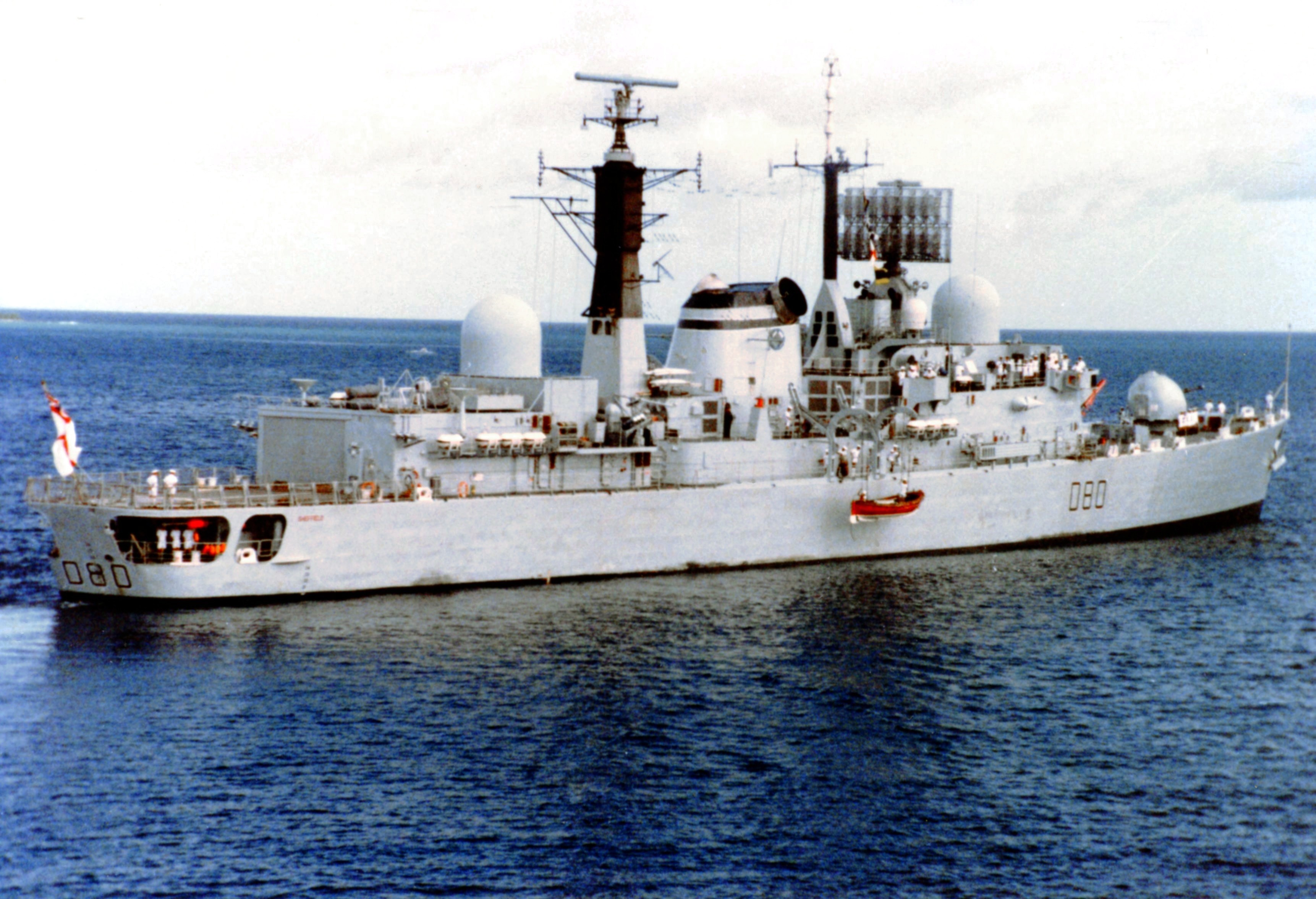
A view of Sheffield showing the exhaust deflectors on the ship's funnel

The first of the Type 42 class, Sheffield, was initially fitted with the odd-looking "Mickey Mouse" ears on her funnel tops which were in fact exhaust deflectors – "Loxton bends" – for the Rolls-Royce Olympus TM3B gas turbines, to guide the high-temperature exhaust efflux sidewards and minimise damage to overhead aerials. As this provided a prominent target for then-new infrared homing missiles, only Sheffield and the next two in the class, the Argentinian Hércules and Santísima Trinidad, had these 'ears'. Sheffield was the only one of her class to not be fitted with STWS II triple anti-submarine torpedo tubes.

== Construction ==
Ordered in 1968 Sheffield was laid down on 15 January 1970 and built by Vickers Shipbuilding and Engineering at Barrow-in-Furness. An explosion during construction killed two dockyard workers and damaged a section of hull which was replaced with a section from an identical ship, Hércules, being built for the Argentine Navy. Sheffield was launched on 10 June 1971 by Queen Elizabeth II and was estimated to have cost £23,200,000 to build.

As the first of her class of Royal Navy destroyers, Sheffield spent her first years trying out the new systems and the Sea Dart missile system, particularly as the intended Sea Dart trials ship, HMS Bristol, suffered serious fires and problems with its steam systems restricting its use in the late 1970s. It was not until 1980 that Sheffield became effective, with Sea Dart and partial installation of electronic warfare Abbey Hill systems. Following a refit in the early 1980s, significant design issues with the ship's Type 909 radar (which was responsible for control and targeting of the Sea Dart missiles) were identified. The ship lacked an electronic countermeasures (ECM) jammer.

== Service history ==
In June 1981 she participated in Exercise Roebuck, following which she fired five Sea Dart missiles. Following participation in Exercise Ocean Safari she sailed in November 1981 to undertake patrols in the Indian Ocean and Persian Gulf.

She was undergoing maintenance at Mombasa when Captain James Salt took over command on 26 January 1982. Both Salt (whose most recent service had been in submarines) and his second in command (who had been an anti-submarine helicopter observer) had little or no relevant experience in surface ships and little experience in air defence.

In March 1982 the ship transited north through the Suez Canal to participate in Exercise Spring Train, which was held in the Atlantic Ocean.

=== Departs for the Falklands ===
In response to the Argentine invasion of the Falkland Islands, Sheffield was ordered on 2 April 1982 to join the task force being assembled to retake the islands. Ammunition and supplies were loaded, loose fittings stowed, and unnecessary memorabilia disembarked. All carpets were removed except for those on Deck 1 and above (which subsequently caught fire when she was hit). To avoid her being mistaken for the Argentine Hércules and Santísima Trinidad, a vertical black marking was painted on the funnel and down to the side to her waterline to aid recognition.

Departing for the South Atlantic on 2 April, Sheffield reached Ascension Island on 14 April, accompanied by HMS Arrow, HMS Brilliant, HMS Coventry, HMS Glasgow to be later joined by RFA Appleleaf. They joined other vessels of the Task Force 317 and commenced operations in the Total Exclusion Zone around the Falklands on 1 May 1982.

It was British policy that any Royal Navy vessel that suspected itself to be under missile attack turn toward the threat, accelerate to maximum speed and fire chaff to prevent the ship being caught defenceless. The codeword used to start this procedure was 'handbrake', which had to be broadcast once the signal of the Super E Agave radar of Super Étendard aircraft was picked up. Within the task force, the threat from the Type 209 submarine was seen as a higher priority than the threat from the air. Following the sinking of General Belgrano, Captain Salt had ordered the ship to change course every 90 seconds to counter any potential Argentine submarine threat.

=== Sinking ===
==== Argentine attack ====
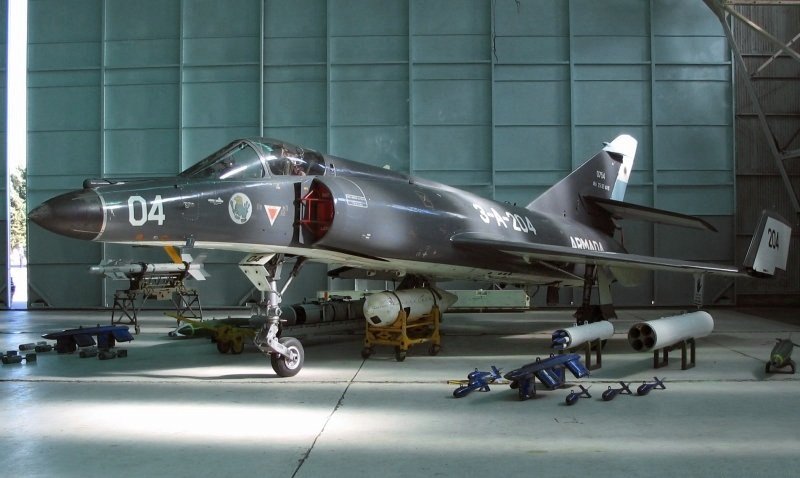
Argentine Navy Dassault-Breguet Super Étendard.

Sheffield was first detected by an Argentine Naval Aviation Lockheed SP-2H Neptune (2-P-112) patrol aircraft at 07:50 on 4 May 1982. The Neptune kept the British ships under surveillance, verifying Sheffield's position again at 08:14 and 08:43. Two Argentine Navy Super Étendards, both armed with AM39 Exocets, took off from Río Grande naval air base at 09:45 and met with an Argentine Air Force KC-130H Hercules tanker to refuel at 10:00. The two aircraft were 3-A-202, piloted by mission commander Capitán de Fragata (Lieutenant Commander) Augusto Bedacarratz, and 3-A-203, piloted by Teniente (Lieutenant) Armando Mayora.

In the two weeks leading up to the attack, Argentinian pilots had been practising tactics against their own ships, including Type 42 destroyers of the same class as Sheffield, and therefore knew the radar horizon, detection distances, and reaction times of the ship radar, as well as the optimal procedure to programme the Exocet missile for a successful attack profile. The technique they used is known colloquially as "Pecking the Lobes", in reference to the aircraft probing the side lobes of the emitting radar using the radar warning receiver. The aircraft could avoid detection by avoiding the main lobe of the emitting radar.

At 10:35, the Neptune climbed to 1,170 metres (3,840 ft) and detected one large and two medium-sized contacts. A few minutes later, the Neptune updated the Super Étendards with the positions. Flying at very low altitude, at approximately 10:50 both Super Étendards climbed to 160 metres (520 ft) to verify these contacts, but failed to locate them and returned to low altitude. They later climbed again and after a few seconds of scanning, the targets appeared on their radar screens.

Both pilots loaded the coordinates into their weapons systems, returned to low level, and after last minute checks, each launched an AM39 Exocet missile at 11:04 while 20 to 30 miles (32 to 48 km) away from their targets. The Super Étendards did not need to refuel again from the KC-130, which had been waiting, and landed at Río Grande at 12:04.

Supporting the mission were an Argentine Air Force Learjet 35 as a decoy and two IAI Daggers as the KC-130 escorts.

==== On Sheffield ====
At approximately 10:00 on 4 May, Sheffield was at defence watches (second degree readiness), the southernmost of three Type 42 destroyers (the others being HMS Glasgow and HMS Coventry operating as a forward anti-aircraft picket 18 to 30 miles (29 to 48 km) to the west of the main task force which were south-east of the Falklands. The weather was fair and the sea calm with a 2-metre swell. HMS Invincible, which was with the main task force, was responsible for Anti-Air Warfare Coordination (AAWC). Sheffield had relieved her sister ship Coventry as the latter was having technical trouble with her Type 965 radar.

Prior to the attack, Sheffield's radar operators had been experiencing difficulty distinguishing Mirage and Super Étendard aircraft, and the destroyer may have lacked effective IFF or radar jamming. Despite intelligence briefings that identified an Exocet attack by Super Étendards as possible, Sheffield had assessed the Exocet threat as overrated for the previous two days, and disregarded another as a false alarm.

As the Type 965 could not detect low-flying aircraft, the two incoming enemy aircraft were not detected flying at 98 feet (30 m). The two planes were detected at a distance of only 40 nautical miles (74 km) by the UAA1, a radar warning receiver. This was then confirmed by the 965M long range aircraft warning radar of Glasgow when the aircraft popped up to 120 feet (37 m) above sea-level for a radar check at 45 nautical miles (83 km). The Glasgow immediately went to action stations, and communicated the warning codeword 'Handbrake' by UHF and HF to all task force ships. The radar contacts were also seen by Invincible, which directed Sea Harriers on combat patrol to investigate, but they detected nothing. The AAWC on Invincible declared the radar contacts as false and left the Air Warning at yellow, instead of raising it to red.

In response to Glasgow's warning, an order to stand to was issued to the crews of the 4.5 inch gun, Sea Dart and 20 mm guns. The aircraft were detected on the forward Type 909 radar but not on the aft set. Sheffield's UAA1 sensor was then blocked by an unauthorised transmission by the ship's satellite communications systems (SCOT). No information was received via data link from Glasgow. Seven seconds later, the first Exocet missile was fired, in response to which Glasgow fired its chaff. Onboard Sheffield, it was not until smoke from the missile was sighted by lookouts that the crew realised they were under attack. The bridge officers did not call the captain to the bridge, made no call to action stations, made no evasive measures, and made no effort to prepare the 4.5-inch gun, the Sea Dart missiles, or order chaff to be fired. The antiair warfare officer was called to the operations room by the principal warfare officer, arriving just before the first missile hit.

Two Exocets had been launched, the second missile being sighted by Yarmouth and missing Sheffield, splashing into the sea 0.5 miles (0.43 nmi) off her port beam. The Exocet that struck Sheffield hit her on the starboard side at deck level 2, travelling through the junior ratings' scullery and breaching the Forward Auxiliary Machinery Room/Forward Engine Room bulkhead 2.4 metres (7.9 ft) above the waterline, creating a hole in the hull roughly 1.2 metres (3.9 ft) by 3 metres (9.8 ft). Contemporary accounts suggested that the missile failed to explode, despite disabling the ship's electrical distribution systems and breaching the pressurised sea water fire main. The damage to the fire system severely hampered any firefighting response and eventually doomed the ship to be consumed by the fire.

At the time of the hit, the captain was off duty in his cabin after having previously visited the operations room, while Sheffield's anti-air warfare officer (AAWO) was in the wardroom chatting to the stewards, and his assistant was in the heads. Sheffield and Coventry were chatting over UHF and communications ceased until an unidentified message was heard flatly stating, "Sheffield is hit."

==== Response ====
The flagship, HMS Hermes, dispatched the escorts HMS Arrow and Yarmouth to investigate, and a helicopter was launched. Confusion reigned until Sheffield's Lynx helicopter unexpectedly landed aboard Hermes carrying the air operations officer and operations officer, confirming the strike.

With the principal fire fighting systems out of action due to the loss of the fire main, the crew were reduced to fighting the fire using portable electrically powered pumps and buckets. The control of firefighting lacked cohesion and was uncoordinated with no emergency HQ being established, while crew members were unclear as to where Command was located. Arrow and Yarmouth assisted in fighting the fire from the outside (to little effect) by stationing themselves to port and starboard respectively.

The crew of Sheffield fought for almost four hours to save the ship before Captain Salt made the decision to abandon ship due to the risk of fires igniting the Sea Dart magazine, the loss of the combat capability of the destroyer, and the exposed position to air attack of Arrow and Yarmouth. Most of the Sheffield's crew climbed over onto Arrow, a few transferred by Gemini RHIB to Yarmouth, while some were taken by helicopter to Hermes. As Sheffield's crew departed in Arrow, Sub-lieutenant Carrington-Wood led the crew in singing "Always Look on the Bright Side of Life" from Monty Python's Life of Brian.

Over the next six days from 4 May 1982, as the ship drifted, five inspections were made to see if any equipment was worth salvaging. Orders were issued to shore up the hole in Sheffield's starboard side and tow the ship to South Georgia. Before these orders were issued, the burnt-out hulk had already been taken under tow by Yarmouth. The high seas that the ship was towed through caused slow flooding through the hole in the ship's side, causing a list to starboard and which eventually caused Sheffield to roll over and sink on the edge of the Total Exclusion Zone in 1,000 fathoms (6,000 ft; 1,800 m) of water at 53°04′S 56°56′W on 10 May 1982, the first Royal Navy vessel sunk in action since World War II.

==== Loss of life ====
Of the 281 crew members, 20 (mainly on duty in the galley area and computer room) died in the attack with another 26–63 were injured, mostly from burns, smoke inhalation or shock. Only one body was recovered. The survivors were taken to Ascension Island on the tanker British Esk. The wreck is a war grave and designated as a protected place under the Protection of Military Remains Act 1986.

== Board of inquiry ==
In response to the loss of the ship, a Ministry of Defence (MOD) Board of Inquiry was convened in HMS Nelson on 7 June 1982. They reported their findings on 28 June 1982. The board's report severely criticized the ship's fire-fighting equipment, training and procedures identifying that the critical factors leading to loss of Sheffield were:

1. Failure to respond to HMS Glasgow's detection and communication of two approaching Super Etendards by immediately going to action stations, activating the Sea Dart and launching chaff decoys;
2. Lack of ECM jamming capability;
3. Lack of a point defence system;
4. Inadequate operator training, in particular simulated realistic low-level target acquisition.
5. Slow response of the available Type 909 Sea Dart tracking radar and its operator limited the possible response.
6. The spread of the fire was not adequately controlled due to the presence of ignitable material coverings, lack of adequate curtains and sealing to restrict smoke and fires. There was also a shortage of breathing apparatus while the forward escape manholes were found to be too small for men who actually were wearing breathing apparatus.

Captain Salt's handling of the ship following the impact of the missile, and his later decision to abandon the ship, were not faulted. The board, however, found that the principal warfare officer and the anti-air warfare officer (AAWO) were guilty of negligence. Admiral John Fieldhouse, the commander in chief of the navy, decided not to court-martial them, undertake any other disciplinary action or any form of formal administrative proceedings.

It was not until 2006, following an extensive campaign by ex-RN personnel, that a heavily censored summary of the board's findings that concealed all of the board's key conclusions and criticisms, including the findings of negligence was released by the Ministry of Defence under UK Freedom of Information laws.

In 2015, a MOD re-assessment of the attack concluded that the Exocet warhead did indeed detonate inside Sheffield, with the results supported by analysis using modern damage analysis tools not available in 1982 and evidence from weapon hits and trials conducted since the end of the Falklands campaign.

In 2017, a complete copy of the report was issued, revealing information that according to The Guardian had been "suppressed" from the summary of the board's findings in the 2006 release. The Guardian explained the missing information as being due to the British Government's attempts to sell off the remaining Type 42 destroyers at the same time. In the "uncensored" report, multiple issues that left the ship unprepared for the attack were identified, including findings of negligence against two officers, who according to The Guardian "escaped court martial and did not face disciplinary action, apparently in order to avoid undermining the euphoria that gripped much of the UK at the end of the war". Among other findings, the "uncensored" report showed that the ship was not sufficiently prepared to ward off an attack, during the attack the anti-air warfare officer was not in the operations room, while his assistant had gone to the toilet. The anti-air warfare officer did not believe Sheffield was within the range of attack of the Argentinian Air Force.

=== Fire ===
The sinking of Sheffield is sometimes blamed on a superstructure made wholly or partially from magnesium-aluminium alloy, the melting point and ignition temperature of which are significantly lower than those of steel. However, this is incorrect as Sheffield's superstructure was made entirely of mild steel. The confusion is related to the US and British navies abandoning aluminium alloys after several fires in the 1970s involving USS Belknap and HMS Amazon and other ships that had aluminium alloy superstructures. (Note: USS Belknap was the lead ship of her class of guided missile cruisers in the United States Navy. HMS Amazon was the first Type 21 frigate of the Royal Navy.) The sinking of the Type 21 frigates Antelope and Ardent, both of which had aluminium alloy superstructures, probably also had an effect on this belief, though these cases are again incorrect and the presence of aluminium alloy had nothing to do with their loss.

The fires in Sheffield and other ships damaged by fire caused a later shift by the Royal Navy from the nylon and synthetic fabrics then worn by British sailors. The synthetics had a tendency to melt onto the skin, causing more severe burns than if the crew had been wearing non-synthetic clothing.

== See also ==
- List of ships sunk by missiles

== Notes ==
Preceded by C24	HMS Sheffield; 1971–1982	Succeeded by F96
