= Type 42 destroyer =

British guided missile destroyer class

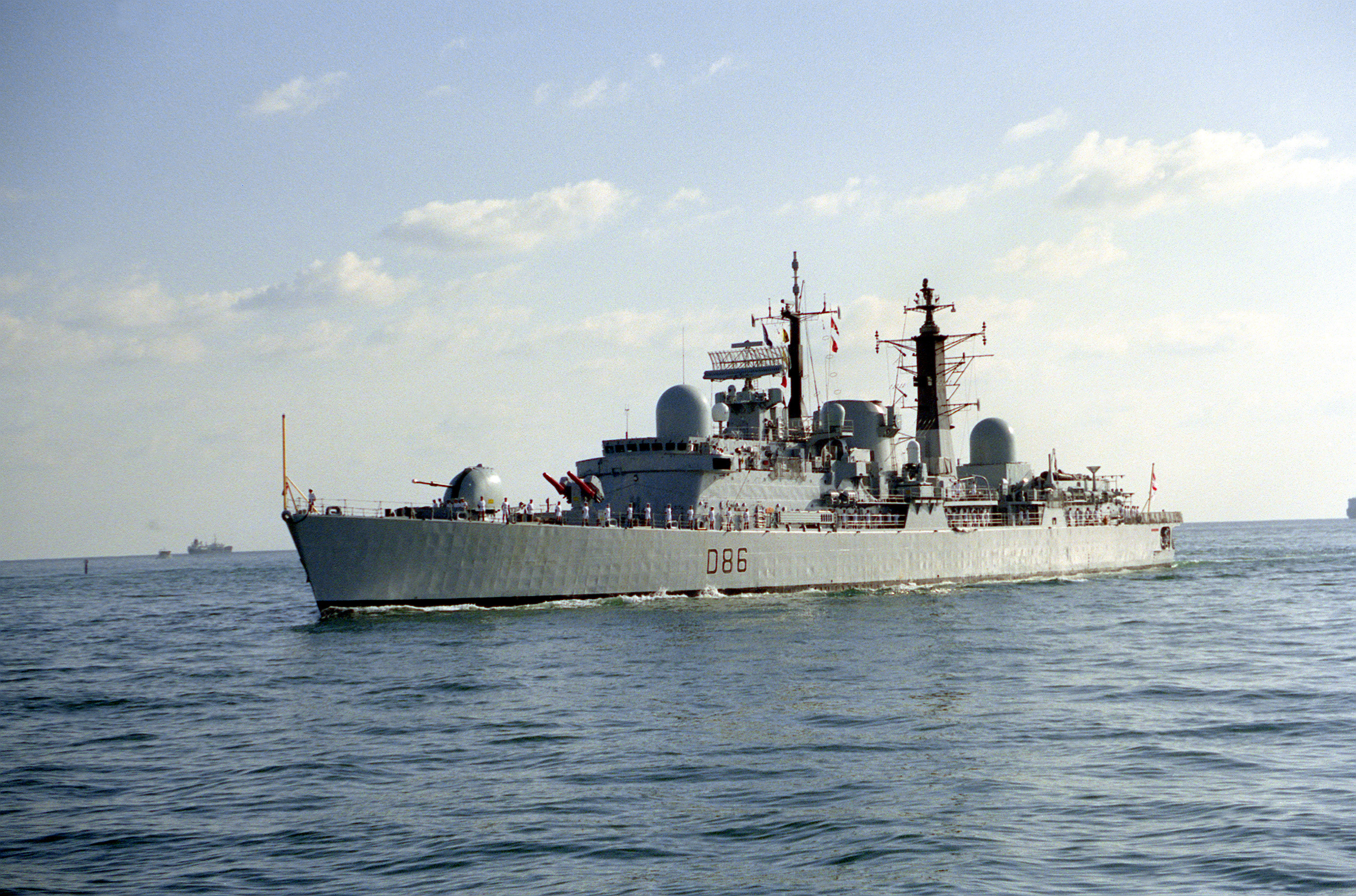
- HMS Birmingham

Class overview
- Name: Type 42
- Builders: Vickers, Cammell-Laird, Swan Hunter, Vosper Thorneycroft, CFNE Argentina
- Operators: Royal Navy (1975–2013); Argentine Navy (1976–2024)
- Preceded by: Type 82 (UK); Py class (Argentina)
- Succeeded by: Type 45 (UK); Almirante Brown class (Argentina)
- Subclasses: Batches 1, 2 and 3
- In service: 1975–2013
- Completed: 16
- Lost: UK: 2 (Falklands War)
- Retired: 14

General characteristics
- Type: Guided-missile destroyer
- Displacement: Batch 1 & 2: 3,500 long tons (3,600 t) standard, 4,100 long tons (4,200 t) or 4,350 tons full load; Batch 3: 3,500 long tons (3,600 t) standard, 4,775 long tons (4,852 t) or 5,350 tons full load
- Length: Batch 1 & 2: 119.5 m (392 ft) waterline, 125 m (410 ft) or 125.6 m (412 ft) overall; Batch 3: 132.3 m (434 ft) waterline, 141.1 m (463 ft) overall
- Beam: Batch 1 & 2: 14.3 m (47 ft); Batch 3: 14.9 m (49 ft)
- Draught: Batch 1, 2 & 3: 4.2 m (14 ft) keel, 5.8 m (19 ft) propellers
- Decks: 8
- Installed power: 50,000 shp (37 MW)
- Propulsion: 2 shafts COGOG; 2 × Rolls-Royce Olympus TM3B high-speed gas turbines, (50,000 shp (37 MW)); 2 × Rolls-Royce Tyne RM1C cruise gas turbines, (5,340 shp (3.98 MW))
- Speed: 30 kn (56 km/h; 35 mph) (2 × Olympus); 24 kn (44 km/h; 28 mph) (1 × Olympus and 1 × Tyne per shaft); 20 kn (37 km/h; 23 mph) (1 × Olympus); 18 kn (33 km/h; 21 mph) (2 × Tyne); 13.8 kn (25.6 km/h; 15.9 mph) (1 × Tyne)
- Range: 4,200 nmi (7,800 km; 4,800 mi) single Tyne RM1C/other shaft trailing at 13.8 kn (25.6 km/h; 15.9 mph)
- Complement: Batch 1 & 2: 253 (incl. 24 officers) or 274, accommodation for 312; Batch 3: 269 (2013); 301 (incl. 26 officers)(1993)
- Sensors & processing systems: Radar Type 1022/965P air surveillance, Radar Type 996/992Q 3D surveillance, 2 × radar Type 909 GWS-30 fire-control, Radar Type 1007 & 1008 navigation, IFF 1016/1017, Sonar Type 2050 / 2016 search, Sonar Type 162 bottom profiling,
- Electronic warfare & decoys: UAA2/UAF; DLH decoy system
- Armament: 1 × twin launcher for GWS-30 Sea Dart missiles (22 missiles, space for an additional 15 in Batch 3); 1 × 4.5 inch Mark 8 naval gun; 2 × 20 mm Phalanx CIWS (after 1982, not on Argentine ships); 2 × Oerlikon / BMARC 20 mm cannon in GAM-B01 single mounts; 4 × MM38 Exocet anti-ship missile launchers (only on Argentine ships); 2 × STWS II triple anti-submarine torpedo tubes (not on Argentine ships)
- Aircraft carried: 1 × Westland Lynx HAS / HMA armed with; 4 × anti-ship missiles; 2 × anti-submarine torpedoes
- Aviation facilities: Flight deck and enclosed hangar for embarking one helicopter

The Type 42 or Sheffield class was developed to provide the Royal Navy with a cost-effective, medium-sized guided-missile destroyer focused on fleet air defence. Conceived in the late 1960s after the cancellation of the more complex and expensive Type 82, the Type 42 was intended to protect naval task groups against airborne threats using the Sea Dart missile system.

While the smaller design allowed for more ships to be built within budget constraints, it imposed compromises in endurance, sea-keeping, and space for future weapons or sensor upgrades. Over its 38 years of service, the class underwent three production batches that addressed some of the class's limitations by lengthening the hull, improving radar and missile systems, and adding close-in weapon systems.

Two vessels, HMS Sheffield (D80) and HMS Coventry (D118), were lost in the 1982 Falklands War, prompting further modifications including enhanced damage control measures, updated electronic warfare suites and changes to material used in the ships' furnishings. The class served as the backbone of Royal Navy air defence and demonstrated a trade-off between affordability and capability reflecting broader Royal Navy strategic priorities during the Cold War and post-Cold War periods, concluding in 2013 when they were replaced by the more capable Type 45 destroyer.

In addition to British service, two Type 42s were built for the Argentine Navy. These two ships saw limited service, few upgrades and were eventually retired.

== History ==
Following the cancellation of the Type 82 air-defence destroyers and the proposed CVA-01 aircraft carrier by the Labour Government in 1966, the Type 42 was conceived as a lighter, cheaper alternative with similar capabilities. The class was fitted with the GWS30 Sea Dart surface-to-air missile, first deployed on the sole Type 82 destroyer, HMS Bristol (D23). The ships also had a flight deck and hangar to operate an anti-submarine warfare helicopter, increasing their versatility compared to the Type 82, which had a flight deck but no hangar.

Feasibility designs completed by the Royal Corps of Naval Constructors in the late-1960s were for a naval staff requirement for an air-defence destroyer with a limited budget of £11.25 million and an artificial limiting displacement of 3,500 tons. Chief Constructor Tony Austin RCNC considered that the design would require 4,100 tons. Extreme decisions were made to reduce the displacement, most significant was shortening the fore-body of the ship, at a saving of around 1% of the total cost. Jack Daniel RCNC as the new head of the Forward Director Group concurred, and argued for the lengthening of the ship. This was not implemented and MK Purvis RCNC completed the design. This proved a poor decision, as the first of class HMS Sheffield suffered hull plating damage from slamming whilst transiting in the Channel. As a short-term solution, the early hulls were reinforced, resulting in a displacement of over 4,000 tons. When Jack Daniel was promoted to Director General Ships he was able to increase the length of the Batch 3 ships (HMS Manchester onwards).

Fourteen vessels were constructed in three distinct batches. In addition to the Royal Navy ships, two were built to a Batch 1 specifications for the Argentine Navy. ARA Hércules (B-52) was built in the Vickers Shipbuilding yard in Barrow-in-Furness, United Kingdom, and delivered August 1976. ARA Santísima Trinidad (1974) was built at the AFNE Río Santiago Shipyard in Buenos Aires and commissioned in July 1981.

The class was budgeted at £19 million per hull but exceeded that limit and the original design proposal was £21 million. To cut costs, the first two batches had 47 feet (14 m) removed from the bow forward of the bridge, reducing the beam-to-length ratio. These early Batch 1 ships performed poorly during sea trials in heavy weather, prompting a review. Batch 2 ships, beginning with HMS Exeter (D89), incorporated improved sensors and minor layout changes. The ninth hull, HMS Manchester (D95), was lengthened during construction, resulting in better seakeeping, and follow-on ships were built to this standard. Strengthening girders were added to the weather decks of Batch 1 and 2 ships, while Batch 3 vessels were built with an external strake to counter longitudinal cracking.

HMS Sheffield (D80) and HMS Coventry (D118) were both sunk in the Falklands War. This was the first conflict since World War II in which surface warships of the same design served on opposing sides. Although there was no direct contact between the ships, both Santísima Trinidad and Hércules locked on to Sea Harrier, XZ451 piloted by Flt Lt Mortimer, with their Type 909 fire-control radars on the 1 May 1982, Mortimer retreated.

The final ship of the class, HMS Edinburgh (D97), was decommissioned on 6 June 2013. Hércules remained in service in a transport and amphibious role and was declared non-operational in 2020 and formally decommissioned in 2024, while Santísima Trinidad sank at her berth at the Port Belgrano Naval Base in January 2013, she was in poor condition before sinking, having been cannibalised to keep Hércules operational.

== Design ==
The first batch was fitted with the Type 965 or Type 966 surveillance radar, both of which had a slow data rate. The Type 992Q radar, used for target designation for the gun and missile systems, lacked Moving Target Indication (MTI). Although British radar manufacturers offered to retrofit MTI, the modification was never carried out. Without MTI, the Type 992Q experienced difficulty in tracking aircraft when they were in front of land, or during snow or rain showers. In addition, the class had insufficient space for an efficient operations room.

The class was armed with a single 4.5 inch Mark 8 naval gun, and earlier vessels carried six Ships Torpedo Weapon System (STWS) torpedo launchers. The Argentine Santísima Trinidad was equipped with the MM38 Exocet for a broader anti-ship capability. The boat decks of the original design were replaced by special decks to install the missiles around the funnel. While this modification applied to both ARA ships, the launchers were never mounted on Santísima Trinidad.

There were three production batches. Batch 1 and Batch 2 ships displaced 4,820 tonnes, while Batch 3 (sometimes referred to as the Manchester class) displaced 5,200 tonnes. The Batch 3 ships were heavily upgraded, incorporating lessons from the Falklands War, although the Sea Wolf missile system was never fitted. Two Phalanx close-in weapon systems were mounted amidships to all surviving batches.

The electronics suite comprised either a Type 1022 D band long-range radar with Outfit LFB track extractor, or a Type 965P long-range air surveillance radar; one Type 996 E band/F band 3D radar for target indication with Outfit LFA track extractor, or a Type 992Q surface-search radar; two Type 909 I/J-band fire-control radars; and an Outfit LFD radar track combiner.

All ships were powered by Rolls-Royce TM3B Olympus and Rolls-Royce RM1C Tyne marinised gas turbines, in a COGOG (combined gas or gas) arrangement, driving through synchronous self-shifting clutches into a double-reduction, dual-tandem, articulated, locked-train gear system, and then to two five-bladed controllable pitch propellers. Electrical power was supplied by four Paxman Ventura 16YJCAZ diesel generators, each producing 1 MW of three-phase electric power at 440 V, 60 Hz.

The lead ship, HMS Sheffield (D80), was initially fitted with exhaust deflectors on her funnel tops to direct high-temperature exhaust gases sideways, reducing heat damage to overhead aerials. This created a prominent target for infrared homing missiles, so only Sheffield and the two Argentine ships, ARA Hércules (B-52), and ARA Santísima Trinidad (1974), retained this feature. Subsequent ships were built with 'cheese grater' uptakes, which mixed machinery space ventilation air with the exhaust gases to reduce infrared signatures.

Availability

In February 1998, the Minister of State for Defence, Dr John Reid, stated: "Type 42 destroyers achieved approximately 84 to 86 per cent average availability for operational service in each of the last five years. This discounts time spent in planned maintenance."

== Operational history and service ==
The Type 42 class was designed to counter long-range strategic bombers from the former Soviet Long-Range Aviation and Soviet Naval Aviation (AV-MF), and to provide area defence for a carrier battle group.

1982 Falklands War

Five ships took part in the Falklands War: Sheffield, Coventry, Glasgow, Exeter and Cardiff. providing long-range air defence and achieving seven confirmed "kills". Coventry was credited with three aircraft: a Puma SA.330L and two A-4 Skyhawks. Exeter shot down four aircraft: two A-4 Skyhawks, a Learjet 35A and a Canberra bomber. Cardiff was involved in a friendly fire incident resulting in the loss of a British Gazelle helicopter.

Sheffield was hit by an Exocet air-to-surface missile launched by an Argentine Super Étendard on 4 May 1982 and sank six days later; Coventry was sunk by 3, 250 kg unguided bombs on the 25 May 1982, with two detonating. and Glasgow was disabled by a bomb that passed through her aft engine room without exploding, damaging fuel systems and disabling the cruising engines. These losses led to a reassessment to subsequent vessels.

1991 Gulf War

On February 25, 1991, during Operation Desert Storm, Gloucester shot down an Iraqi Silkworm missile targeting USS Missouri.

Task group deployments

Type 42s performed fleet contingency duties, including West Indies counter-drug operations, Falkland Islands patrols, NATO Mediterranean and Atlantic task group deployments, and Persian Gulf patrols. The increased deployment of Type 23 frigates in place of Type 42s to high-intensity operational areas reflected persistent serviceability and reliability problems, alongside growing obsolescence of their combat and machinery systems.

== Construction programme ==
Pennant	Name	Hull builder	Ordered	Laid down	Launched	Accepted into service (Note: The term used in Navy Estimates and Defence Estimates is "accepted into service". Hansard has used the term acceptance date. Leo Marriott in his various books uses the term "completed", as does Jane's Fighting Ships. These terms all mean the same thing: the date the Navy accepts the vessel from the builder. This date is important because maintenance cycles, etc. are generally calculated from the acceptance date.)	Commissioned	Estimated building cost (Note: "Unit cost, i.e. excluding the cost of certain items (e.g. aircraft, First Outfits)." – Text from Defences Estimates "They do not include other costs, such as those for Government Furnished Equipment (GFE)—as they are not held centrally for each ship and could be provided only at disproportionate cost." Bob Ainsworth, Minister of State for the Armed Forces, 16 July 2008.)
Royal Navy – batch 1
D80	Sheffield	Vickers Shipbuilders Ltd, Barrow-in-Furness.	14 November 1968	15 January 1970	10 June 1971	16 February 1975	16 February 1975 (Note: These two sources are in agreement about the dates vessels were commissioned, with the following exceptions: Sheffield: Marriott 28 February 1975. Hansard 16 February 1975.; Glasgow: Marriott 25 May 1979. Hansard 24 May 1979.; Cardiff: Marriott 19 October 1979. Hansard 24 September 1979.; Nottingham: Marriott 8 April 1983. Hansard 14 April 1983.; Liverpool: Marriott 9 July 1982. Hansard 1 July 1982.)	£23,200,000
D86	Birmingham	Cammell Laird & Co, Birkenhead.	21 May 1971	28 March 1972	30 July 1973	26 November 1976	3 December 1976	£31,000,000
D87	Newcastle	Swan Hunter Ltd, Wallsend-on-Tyne.	11 November 1971	21 February 1973	24 April 1975	25 February 1978	23 March 1978	£34,600,000
D118	Coventry	Cammell Laird & Co, Birkenhead.	21 May 1971	29 January 1973	21 June 1974	20 October 1978	10 November 1978	£37,900,000
D88	Glasgow	Swan Hunter Ltd, Wallsend-on-Tyne.	11 November 1971	16 April 1974	14 April 1976	9 March 1979	24 May 1979	£36,900,000
D108	Cardiff	Vickers Shipbuilders Ltd, Barrow-in-Furness (to launching stage); Swan Hunter Ltd, Hebburn (for completion).	10 June 1971	6 November 1972	22 February 1974	22 September 1979	24 September 1979	£40,500,000 (Note: Moore, John Jane's Fighting Ships, 1982–83, pub Jane's Publishing Co Ltd, 1982, ISBN 0-7106-0742-3-page 553 said £40.4 million. Marriott, Leo Modern Combat Ships 3, Type 42, pub Ian Allan, 1985, ISBN 0-7110-1453-1-page 15 said £40.4 million. Aldrich, Richard James Intelligence, Defence, and Diplomacy: British Policy in the Post-War World. Taylor & Francis, pub 1994, ISBN 0-7146-4140-5 page 119 says: "One example of how delay in procurement programmes can raise costs is the construction of the Type-42 destroyer HMS Cardiff. Vickers Shipbuilders had originally intended to deliver the vessel in 1975 for a total cost of £15 million. Owing to difficulties in recruiting labourer to work on construction the ship was only completed in 1978 and cost double the original price (over £30 million)." On page 129 it gives the source of this cost data as: "Fourth Report from the Committee on Public Accounts, 1976–77 (H.C. 304), April 1977, pp xii–xiii and Q. 92." The cost quoted in Aldrich is from a source written before the completion of the vessel, and so is less complete than the cost quoted in Jane's and Marriott, which were written after completion of the vessel, and are nearly the same as the Hansard figure.)
Royal Navy – batch 2
D89	Exeter	Swan Hunter Ltd, Wallsend-on-Tyne.	22 January 1976	22 July 1976	25 April 1978	30 August 1980	19 September 1980	£60,100,000
D90	Southampton	Vosper Thornycroft Ltd, Woolston.	17 March 1976	21 October 1976	29 January 1979	17 August 1981	31 October 1981	£67,500,000
D92	Liverpool	Cammell Laird & Co, Birkenhead.	27 May 1977	5 July 1978	25 September 1980	12 May 1982	1 July 1982	£92,800,000
D91	Nottingham	Vosper Thornycroft Ltd, Woolston.	1 March 1977	6 February 1978	18 February 1980	22 December 1982	14 April 1983	£82,100,000
Royal Navy – batch 3
D95	Manchester	Vickers Shipbuilders Ltd, Barrow-in-Furness.	10 November 1978	19 May 1978	24 November 1980	19 November 1982	16 December 1982	£110,000,000
D98	York	Swan Hunter Ltd, Wallsend-on-Tyne.	25 April 1979	18 January 1980	21 June 1982	25 March 1985	9 August 1985	£118,700,000
D96	Gloucester	Vosper Thornycroft Ltd, Woolston.	27 March 1979	29 October 1979	2 November 1982	16 May 1985	11 September 1985	£120,800,000
D97	Edinburgh	Cammell Laird & Co, Birkenhead.	25 April 1979	8 September 1980	13 April 1983	25 July 1985	17 December 1985	£130,600,000
Argentine Republic Navy– batch 1
D1	Hércules	Vickers Shipbuilders Ltd, Barrow-in-Furness.	18 May 1970	16 June 1971	24 October 1972	10 May 1976	12 July 1976	
D2	Santísima Trinidad	AFNE, Rio Santiago, Argentina.	18 May 1970	11 October 1971	9 November 1974		1 July 1981	

In May 1982, the Parliamentary Under-Secretary of State (Jerry Wiggin) stated that the current replacement cost of a Type 42 destroyer of the Sheffield class was "about £120 million." In July 1984, the Parliamentary Under-Secretary of State (John Lee) stated: "the average cost of the three Type 42 destroyers currently under construction is £117 million at 1983–84 price levels."

== Running costs ==
=== Not including major refits and upgrades ===
Date	Running cost	What is included	Citation
1981–82	£10.0 million	Average annual running cost of Type 42s at average 1981–82 prices and including associated aircraft costs but excluding the costs of major refits.	
1985–86	£15 million	The average cost of running and maintaining a type 42 destroyer for one year.	
1987–88	£7 million	The average annual operating costs, at financial year 1987–88 prices of a type 42 destroyer. These costs include personnel, fuel, spares, and so on, and administrative support services, but exclude new construction, capital equipment, and refit-repair costs.	
2001–02	£13.0 million	Type 42 destroyer, average annual operating costs, based on historic costs over each full financial year. The figures include manpower, maintenance, fuel, stores, and other costs (such as harbour dues), but exclude depreciation and cost of capital.	
2002–03	£13.5 million	Type 42 destroyer, average annual operating costs, based on historic costs over each full financial year. The figures include manpower, maintenance, fuel, stores, and other costs (such as harbour dues), but exclude depreciation and cost of capital.	

=== Including refits and upgrades ===
Date	Running cost	What is included	Citation
2007–08	£31.35 million	"The annual operating cost of the Type 42 Class of Destroyers, covering a total of eight vessels in the 07/08 period, is £250.8M." "This is based on information primarily from Financial Year 07/08 the last year for which this information is available, and includes typical day-to-day costs such as fuel and manpower and general support costs covering maintenance, repair and equipment spares. Costs for equipment spares are also included, although these are based on Financial Year 08/09 information as this is the most recent information available. Costs for weapon system support are not included as they could only be provided at disproportionate cost."	
2009–10	£26.7 million	"The average running cost per class... Type 42 is £160.1 million. These figures, based on the expenditure incurred by the Ministry of Defence in 2009–10, include maintenance, safety certification, military upgrades, manpower, inventory, satellite communication, fuel costs, and depreciation.".	

In May 2000, the Minister of State for the Armed Forces (John Spellar) stated: "The running costs of each of the Royal Navy's Type 42 destroyers for each of the past five years are contained in the following table. This includes repair and maintenance, manpower, fuel, and other costs such as port and harbour dues. Year-on-year variations are largely attributable to refit periods."

Running costs
Ship	1995–96	1996–97	1997–98	1998–99	1999–2000
Birmingham	£32.28 million	£16.92 million	£17.38 million	£13.38 million	£10.39 million
Newcastle	£32.60 million	£31.60 million	£18.57 million	£13.90 million	£13.73 million
Glasgow	£14.70 million	£29.47 million	£26.36 million	£13.61 million	£12.65 million
Cardiff	£19.86 million	£41.2 million	£28.86 million	£13.20 million	£17.87 million
Exeter	£19.46 million	£15.72 million	£40.83 million	£12.76 million	£14.48 million
Southampton	£16.53 million	£20.37 million	£17.91 million	£39.09 million	£18.79 million
Nottingham	£18.70 million	£17.24 million	£19.08 million	£13.08 million	£32.74 million
Liverpool	£16.92 million	£20.75 million	£14.59 million	£14.79 million	£14.63 million
Manchester	£17.99 million	£19.40 million	£14.58 million	£12.22 million	£12.69 million
Gloucester	£19.33 million	£19.40 million	£13.89 million	£21.49 million	£15.77 million
York	£20.48 million	£19.79 million	£17.50 million	£11.78 million	£21.88 million
Edinburgh	£35.27 million	£19.29 million	£22.50 million	£13.00 million	£12.28 million

== Fate of ships ==
Pennant	Name	Home port	Commissioned	Status	
Royal Navy
Batch 1
D80	Sheffield	Portsmouth	16 February 1975	Sunk in Falklands War 4 May 1982 / 10 May 1982	
D86	Birmingham	Portsmouth	3 December 1976	Decommissioned 31 December 1999	Scrapped October 2000
D88	Glasgow	Portsmouth	25 May 1977	Decommissioned 1 February 2005	Scrapped January 2009
D87	Newcastle	Portsmouth	23 March 1978	Decommissioned 1 February 2005	Scrapped November 2008
D118	Coventry	Portsmouth	20 October 1978	Sunk in Falklands War 25 May 1982	
D108	Cardiff	Portsmouth	24 September 1979	Decommissioned 14 July 2005	Scrapped November 2008
Batch 2
D89	Exeter	Portsmouth	18 September 1980	Decommissioned 27 May 2009	Scrapped September 2011
D90	Southampton	Portsmouth	31 October 1981	Decommissioned 12 February 2009	Scrapped October 2011
D92	Liverpool	Portsmouth	9 July 1982	Decommissioned 30 March 2012	Scrapped October 2014
D91	Nottingham	Portsmouth	8 April 1983	Decommissioned 11 February 2010	Scrapped October 2011
Batch 3
D95	Manchester	Portsmouth	16 December 1982	Decommissioned 24 February 2011	Scrapped November 2014
D98	York	Portsmouth	9 August 1985	Decommissioned 27 September 2012	Scrapped August 2015
D96	Gloucester	Portsmouth	11 September 1985	Decommissioned 30 June 2011	Scrapped September 2015
D97	Edinburgh	Portsmouth	17 December 1985	Decommissioned 6 June 2013	Scrapped August 2015
Navy of the Argentine Republic
B-52 (ex D-1)	Hércules	Puerto Belgrano	12 July 1976	Transformed in a multi-purpose transport ship since 2000. As of 2020, reported non-operational. Formally retired in 2024.	
D-2	Santísima Trinidad	Puerto Belgrano	1 July 1981	Decommissioned in 2004. Intended to become a naval museum, but sank, as a result of negligence, off Puerto Belgrano on 22 January 2013. She was refloated in December 2015 and moved to a drydock to evaluate her restoration as a museum ship. But due to serious damage and lack of funds, she was destined to be scrapped in 2018.	Scrapped 2025.

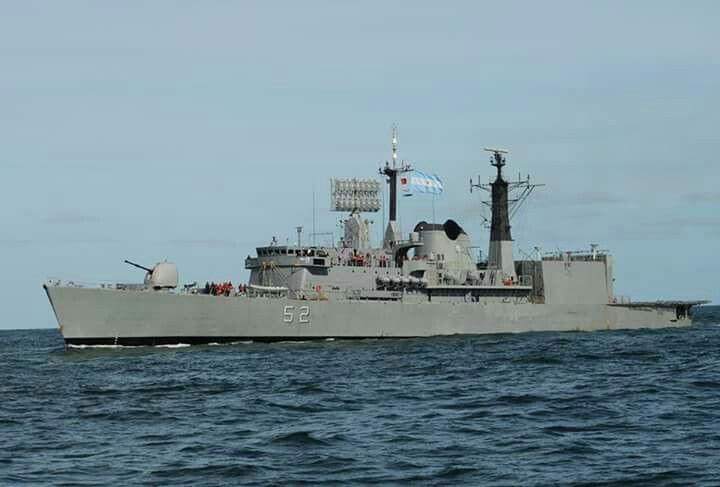
ARA Hércules following her conversion

The surviving Argentine Type 42, Hércules, was based at Puerto Belgrano Naval Base, Argentina, and converted into an amphibious command ship through the addition of a new aft superstructure and hangar. She was originally fitted with four single Exocet missile launchers, two on either side of the funnel facing forward but these were removed during refit. As of 2020, Hércules was reported to be non-operational. The other Argentine vessel, Santísima Trinidad, capsized and sank alongside her berth at Puerto Belgrano on 22 January 2013, reportedly as a result of poor maintenance and negligence leading to a burst seawater main and catastrophic flooding. She was formally taken out of service in 2024.

Prior to her demise, Santísima Trinidad was extensively cannibalised for spare parts for her more active sister ship. In December 2015, she was refloated and placed in drydock to evaluate the cost of restoration as a museum ship. Finally, due to the very high cost required, it was decided to scrap her in 2016. The ship was finally actually broken down in 2025 (after many years of uncertainty as to whether she would be scrapped or not).

== Replacement ==
All the Royal Navy Type 42 ships are now decommissioned. Initially, the United Kingdom sought to procure replacements through collaboration with seven other NATO nations under the NFR-90 project, and then with France and Italy via the Horizon CNGF programme. Both collaborative ventures failed, leading to the national Type 45 project. Six Type 45 destroyers, Daring, Dauntless, Diamond, Dragon, Defender and Duncan, are all in commission and are considerably larger, displacing 7,500 tonnes compared to the Type 42's 3,600 tonnes.

== See also ==
- List of destroyer classes

Equivalent destroyers of the same era

- Spruance class – Destroyer class of the US Navy
- Sovremenny class – Class of destroyer built for the Soviet Navy
- Audace class – Italian class of guided missile destroyers
- Tachikaze class – Japanese guided missile destroyer class
- Iroquois class – Class of guided missile destroyers
- Gangwon class – Destroyers of the South Korean Navy
- Type 051 class – Class of guided missile destroyers fielded by the Chinese People's Liberation Army Navy
