= Coventry Cross of Nails =

Symbol of peace and reconciliation after the Second World War

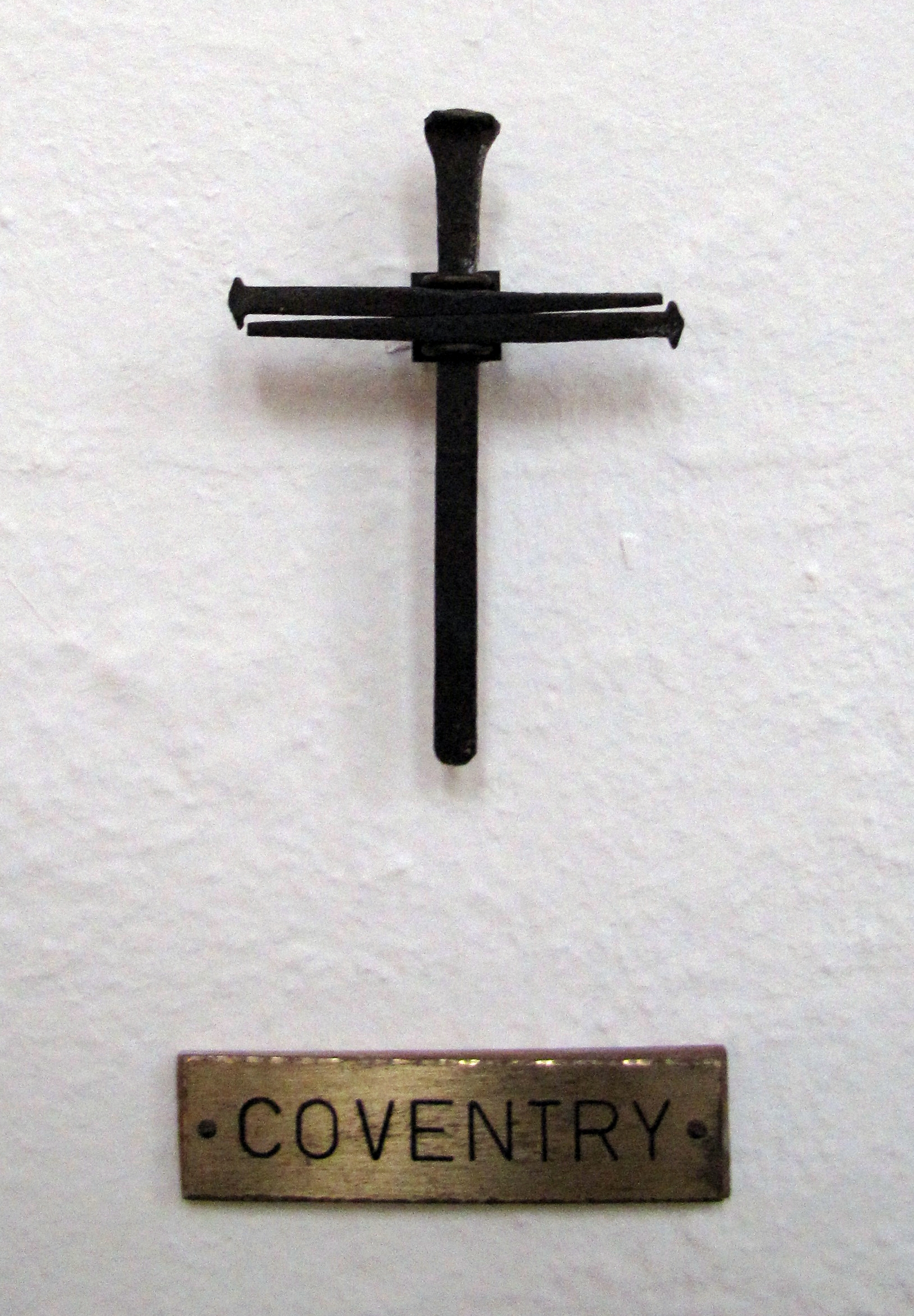
Coventry Cross of Nails at St. Nikolai, Kiel

A Coventry Cross of Nails (in German, Nagelkreuz von Coventry) is a Christian cross made from iron nails, employed as a symbol of peace and reconciliation. The original version was made from three large medieval nails salvaged from the Coventry Cathedral after the building was severely damaged by German bombs on 14 November 1940, during the Second World War. In the following decades, several hundred crosses have been given as gifts to various organisations, including churches, prisons and schools. The form of the cross echoes the crucifixion of Christ, and the nails with which Christ was affixed to the cross according to some accounts.

== In Coventry ==
Coventry Cathedral was severely damaged during the Coventry Blitz, and its roof was destroyed on 14 November 1940. The idea for the cross came from Rev Arthur Philip Wales, who was then rector of St Mark's church in Coventry, which was also damaged in the bombing, and later rector at St Michael's church in Warmington, Warwickshire. He found several large hand-forged medieval carpenters nails as he walked through the ruins of the cathedral on the morning after the bombing. He used some wire to bind together three nails into the shape of a Latin cross, with one nail vertical and two head-to-tail as a cross-piece, and presented them to the Bishop of Coventry, Mervyn Haigh. The Cathedral's Provost Richard Howard had the words "Father Forgive" carved into the wall behind the altar of the ruined building, and two charred beams fallen together into the shape of a cross were erected among the rubble. The original charred cross is now displayed in the new cathedral, constructed after the war adjacent to the ruins of the medieval cathedral, with a replica placed in the standing ruins of the old cathedral.

The original cross of nails is also retained by the new cathedral. It made a progress around the churches of the diocese in Lent 1962, returning to the new cathedral on the eve of its consecration on 25 May 1962, and is now often displayed at the High Altar, with the nails now welded into place.

== Elsewhere ==
In September 1947, Richard Howard visited Kiel and presented a cross made from medieval nails found in the ruins of Coventry Cathedral to the church of St Nikolai; in return, Howard was presented with a stone from the ruins of the German church. Over subsequent years, hundreds of nail crosses have been given to various organisations, originally using medieval nails from the old cathedral but more recently using modern replicas. In many places the Coventry Cross of Nails is mounted on a wall, or displayed on an altar.

The recipients of nail crosses from Coventry were brought together in 1974 to form an ecumenical "Community of the Cross of Nails", developed by Bill Williams, Provost at Coventry Cathedral from 1958 to 1981. The network of over 200 organisations in 45 countries shares a commitment to peace, justice and reconciliation. It includes dozens of churches in Germany, including the Dresden Frauenkirche, the Garrison Church in Potsdam, and Kaiser Wilhelm Memorial Church and Chapel of Reconciliation (Kapelle der Versöhnung) in Berlin, and in other cities in the UK and elsewhere. At many, the Coventry Litany of Reconciliation is recited each Friday; the short prayer was written by Canon Joseph Poole in 1958.

A Coventry Cross of Nails was on board the Type 42 destroyer HMS Coventry (D118) during the Falklands War, sunk with the ship and later salvaged by Royal Navy Operation Blackleg divers. It was returned to Coventry Cathedral, kept by the next HMS Coventry, a Type 22 frigate, from 1988 until she was decommissioned in 2002, and later presented to the Type 45 destroyer HMS Diamond (D34), which is affiliated to Coventry.

== Gallery ==
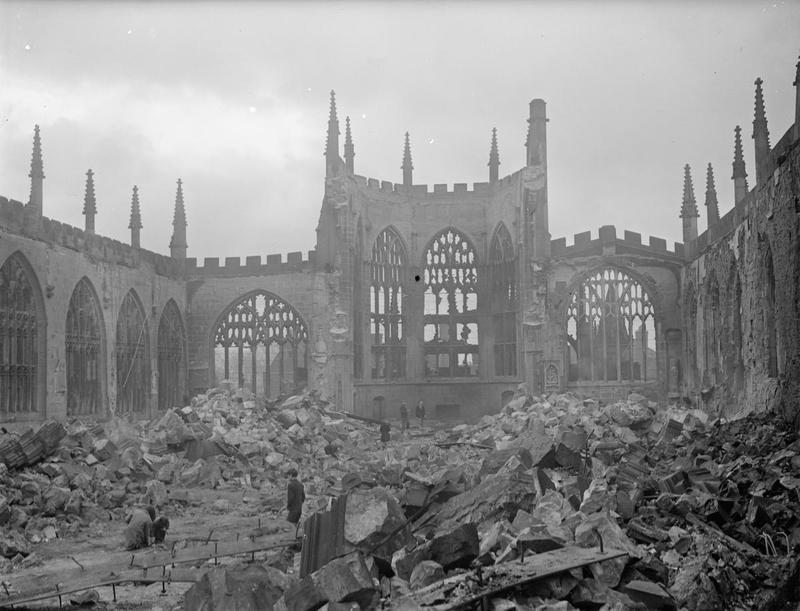
Ruins of Coventry Cathedral on 16 November 1940

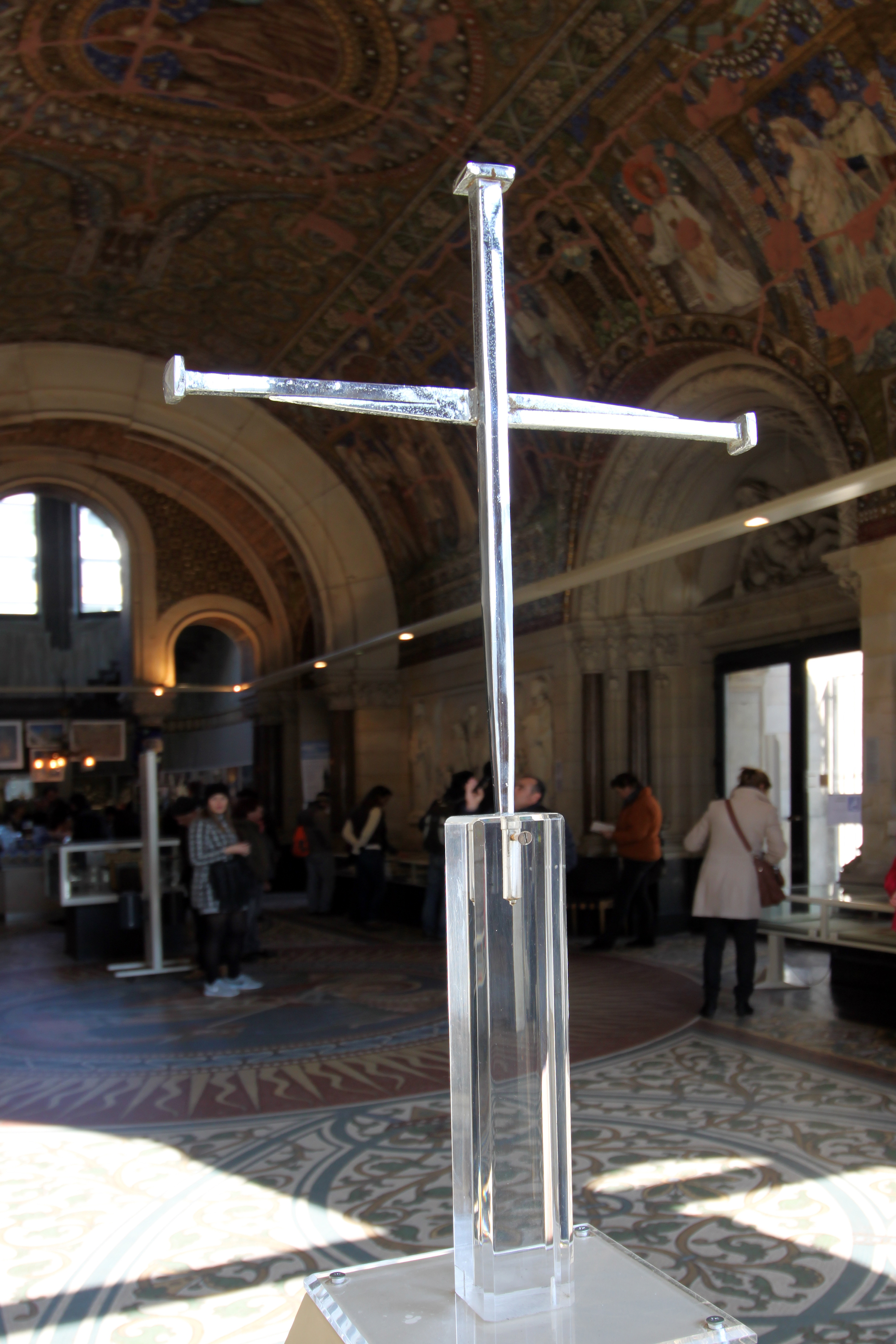
At the Kaiser Wilhelm Memorial Church, Berlin

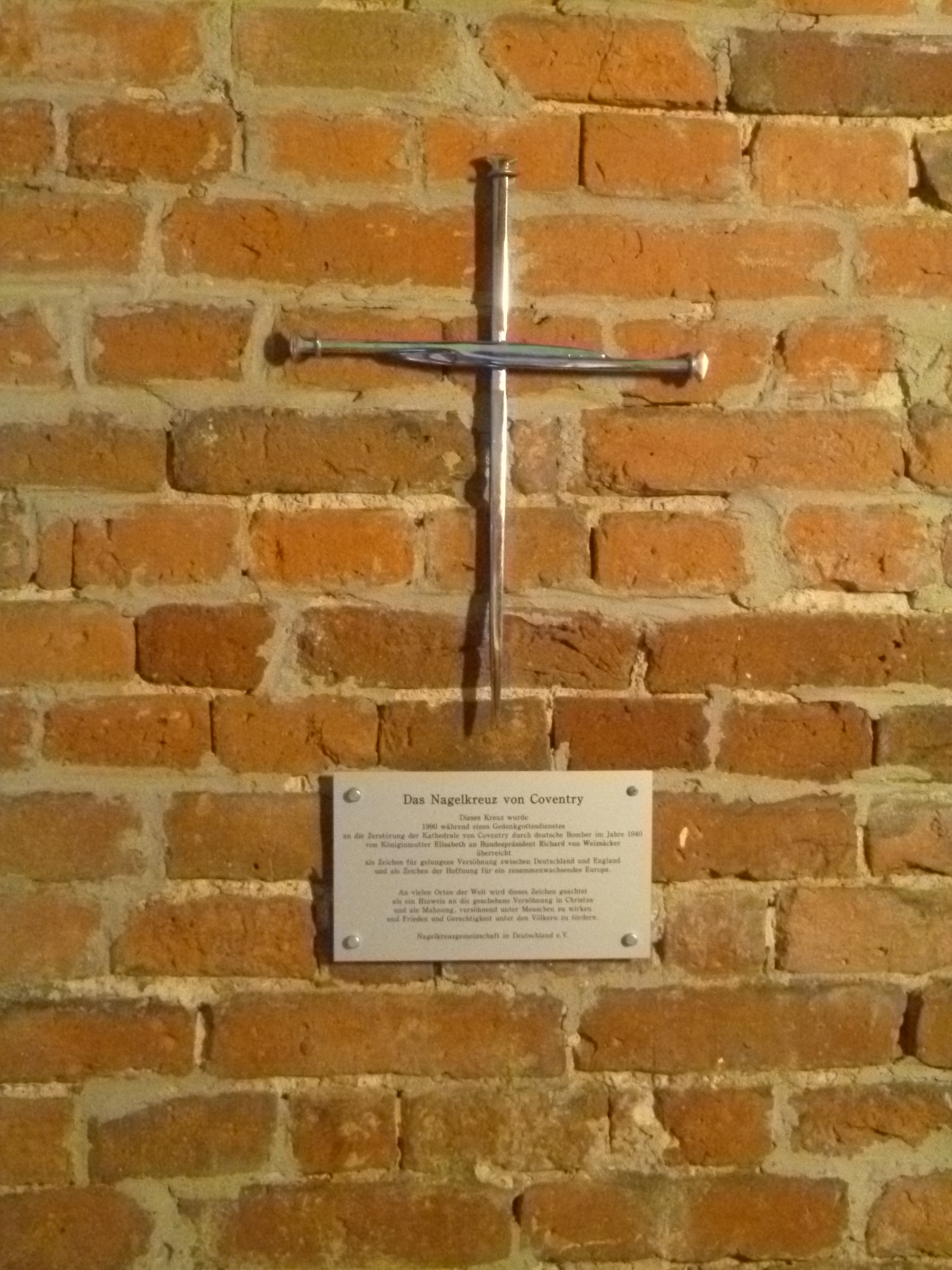
At the Neue Kirche, Berlin

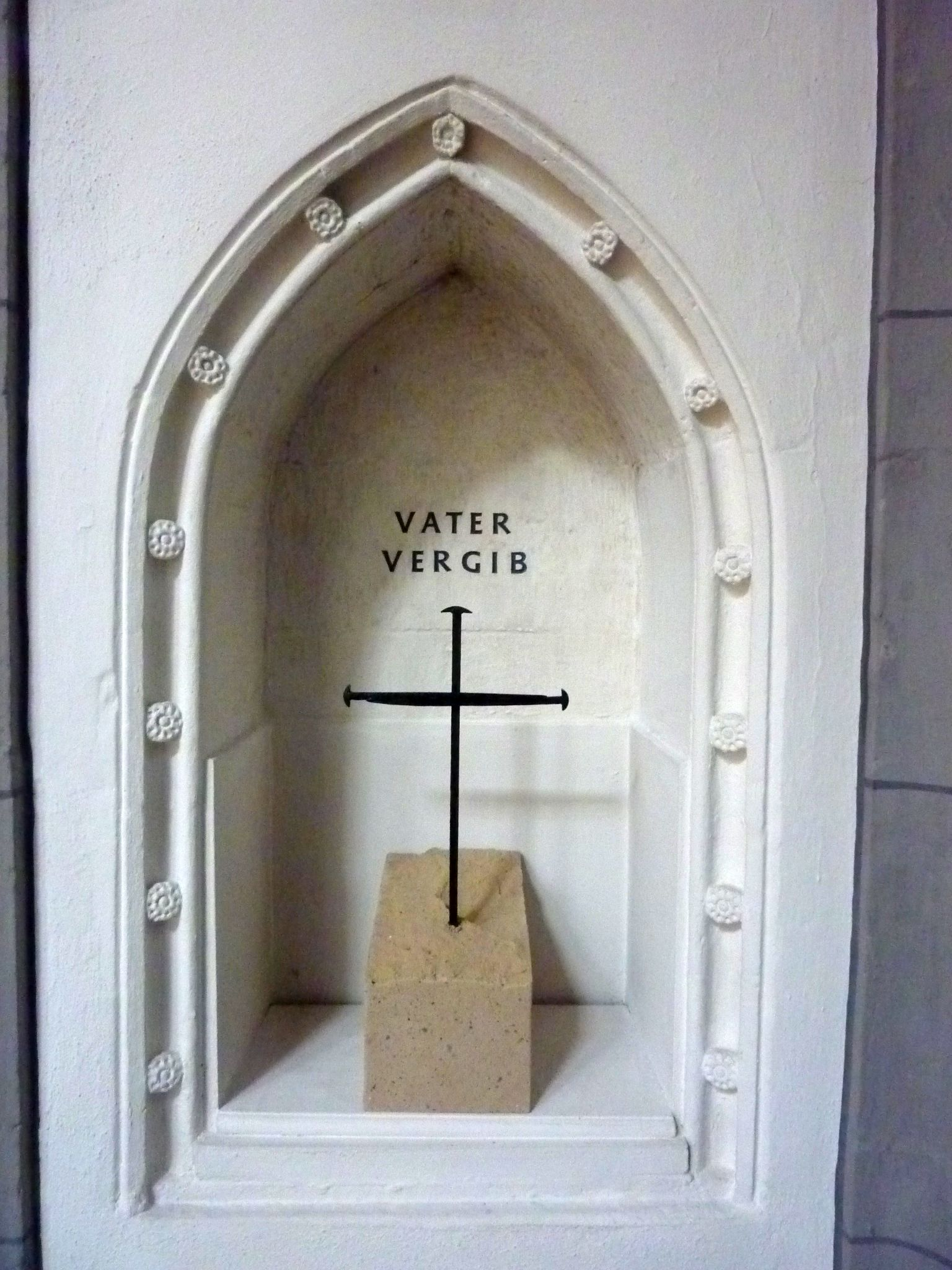
At the Antoniterkirche, Cologne

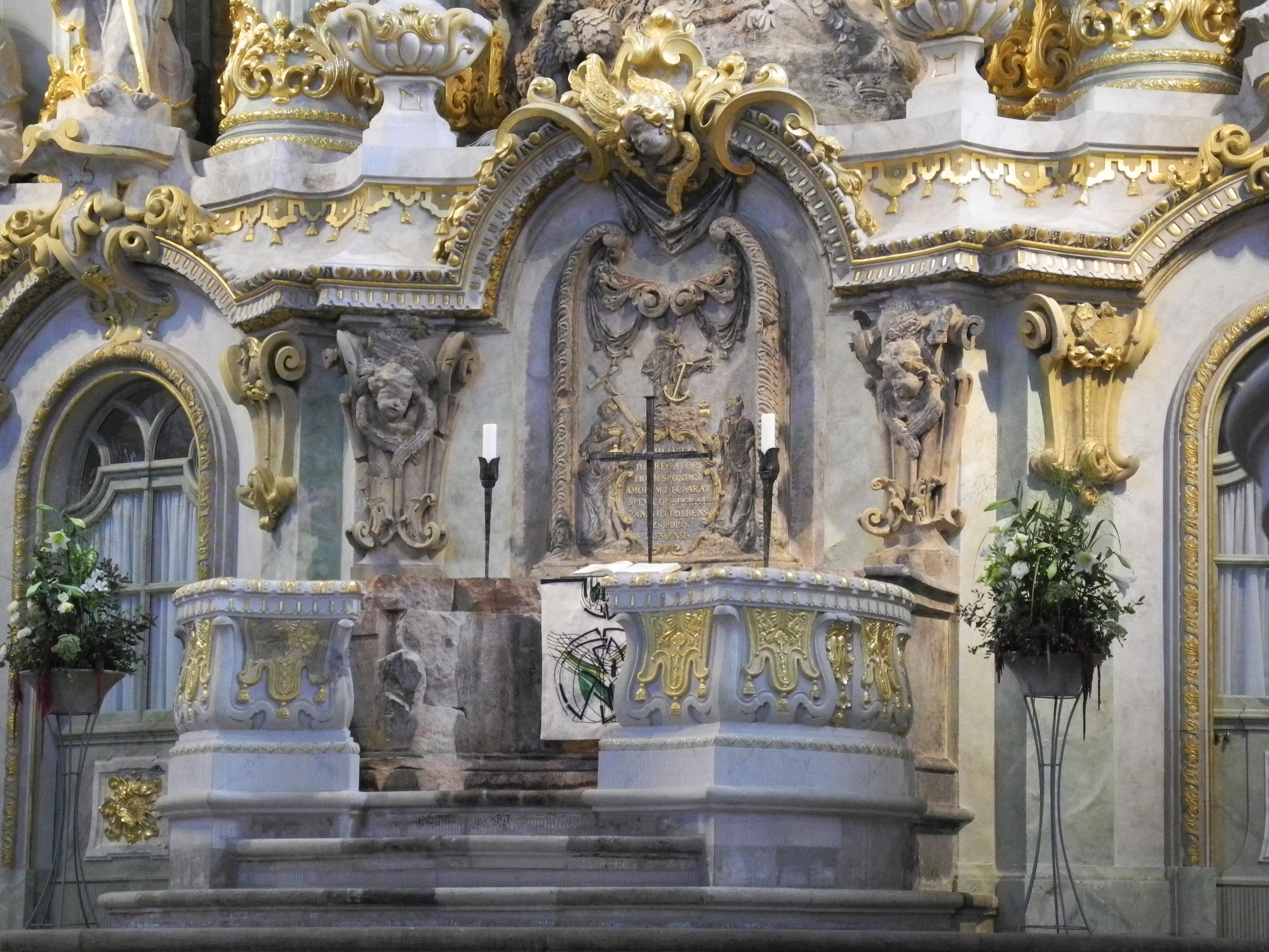
At the Frauenkirche, Dresden

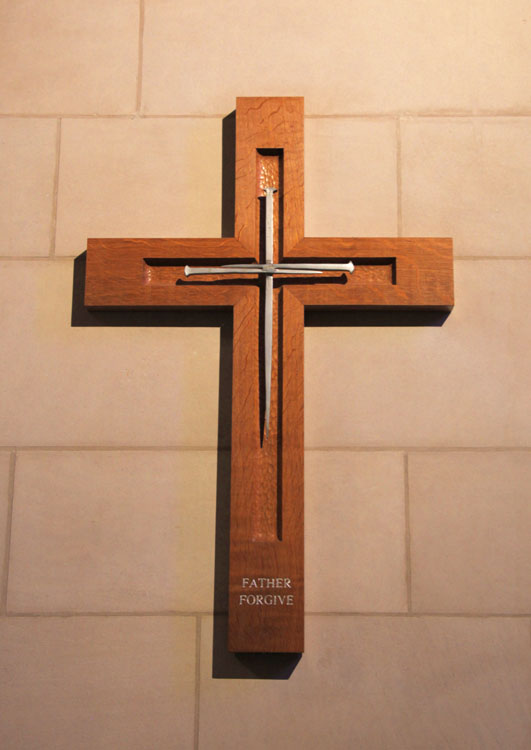
At Washington National Cathedral, Washington, D.C.

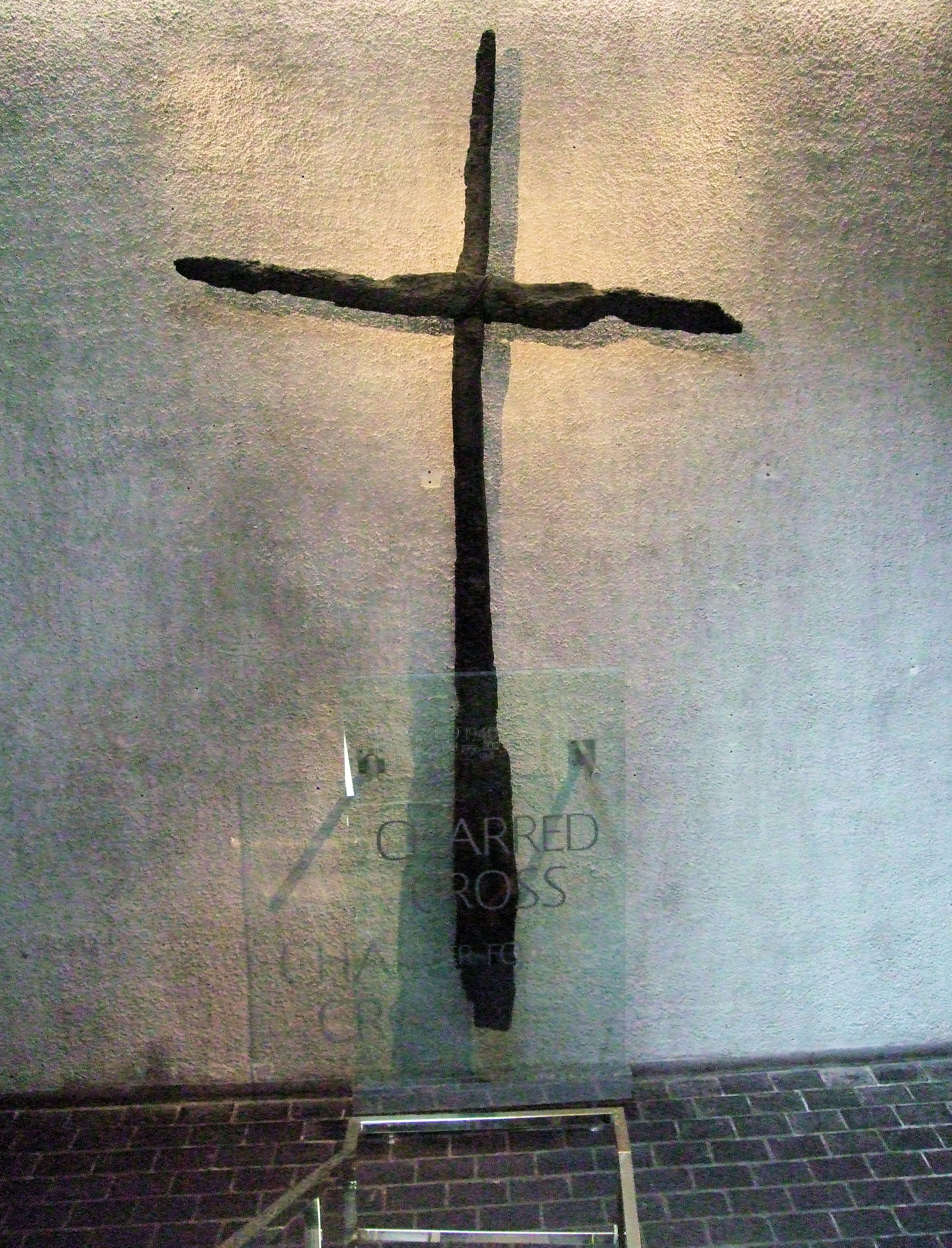
Charred cross in Coventry Cathedral

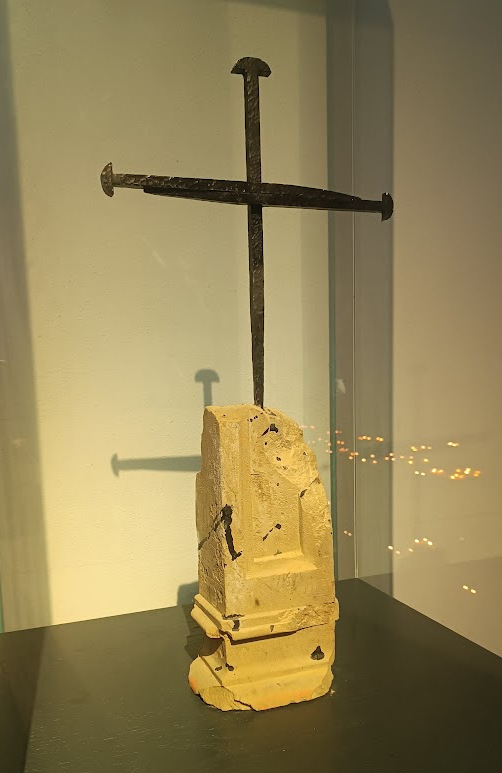
One of the four Coventry Crosses of Nails in Würzburg, placed in St. Kilian's Cathedral in a tomb from 1945 next to the Pietà, where the dead were laid to rest after the destruction of Würzburg in 1945

== See also ==
- Lamp of Brotherhood – Decorative oil lamp as a symbol of reconciliation
