= HMS Coventry (D118) =

British destroyer, 1974–1982

Coordinates: 51°3′36″S 59°42′12″W

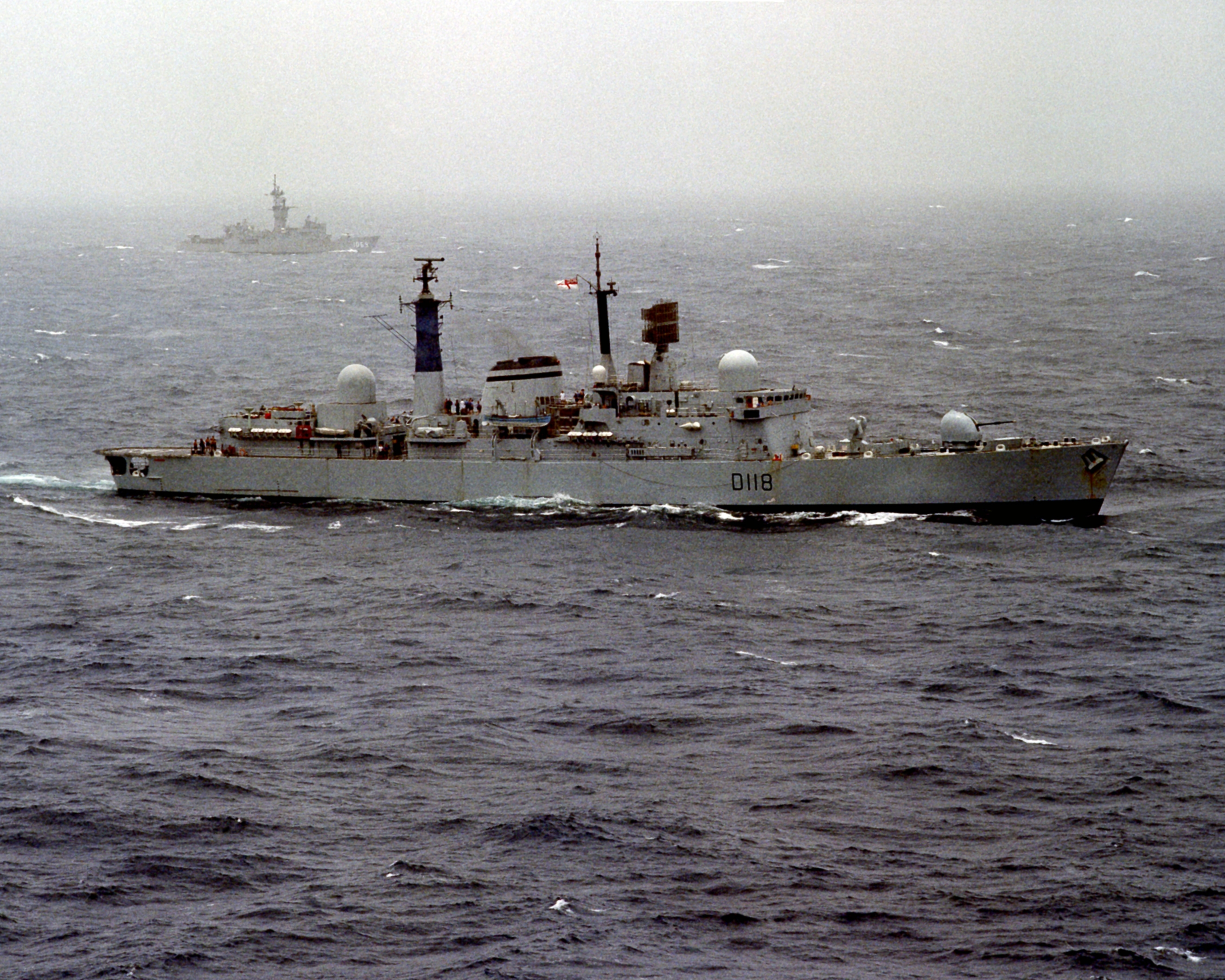
- HMS Coventry

History

United Kingdom
- Name: HMS Coventry
- Builder: Cammell Laird
- Laid down: 29 January 1973
- Launched: 21 June 1974
- Commissioned: 10 November 1978
- Identification: Pennant number: D118
- Fate: Sunk by Argentina on 25 May 1982
- Badge

General characteristics
- Class & type: Type 42 destroyer
- Displacement: 4,820 tonnes
- Length: 125 m (410 ft)
- Beam: 14.3 m (47 ft)
- Draught: 5.8 m (19 ft)
- Propulsion: COGOG (Combined Gas or Gas) turbines, 2 shafts producing 36 MW
- Speed: 30 knots (56 km/h; 35 mph)
- Complement: 287
- Armament: Sea Dart missile; 4.5-inch (113 mm) Mk.8 gun; Two Oerlikon 20 mm cannons.; Two STWS Mark 2 torpedo tubes, two Corvus chaff launchers.
- Aircraft carried: Westland Lynx HAS.Mk.1/2

HMS Coventry was a Type 42-class destroyer of the Royal Navy. Laid down by Cammell Laird, at Birkenhead on 29 January 1973, she was launched on 21 June 1974 and accepted into service on 20 October 1978.

She was sunk by Argentine Air Force Douglas A-4 Skyhawk attack aircraft on 25 May 1982 during the Falklands War while the destroyer was acting as a decoy from the amphibious landings in San Carlos water.

== Background ==
The principal role of these ships was to provide the fleet with mid-range anti-air warfare capability with secondary roles of anti-surface and anti-submarine. Fourteen Type 42s were built for the Royal Navy in three tranches between 1972 and 1985; Coventry was the last of the first tranche to be commissioned. To cut costs, the first two tranches had 47 ft (14 m) removed from the bow and the beam-to-length ratio reduced. These early Type 42s performed poorly during trials and were notoriously poor sea-keepers. Coventry was costed at £37,900,000.

Type 42 destroyers were fitted with the Sea Dart surface-to-air missiles designed in the 1960s to counter threats from crewed aircraft. Sea Dart was constrained by limitations on its firing capacity and reaction time, but did prove itself during the Falklands War with seven kills, three of these attributed to Coventry.

== Service history ==
=== 1978–1982 ===
Coventry was commissioned on 10 November 1978 under the command of Captain C. P. O. Burne at Portsmouth. Following post-commissioning trials, the ship was used to trial the operation of the new Westland Lynx helicopter on Type 42 platform, to test the combination's safe operating limits.

The ship's first major deployment came in 1980 when she was sent to the Far East; in September of that year, alongside the County-class destroyer Antrim and the frigate Alacrity, she became the first British warship to visit the People's Republic of China in 30 years. En route back to the UK, Coventry was diverted to the Persian Gulf following the outbreak of the Iran–Iraq War, where the ship remained on patrol for six weeks until relieved by the start of the permanent Armilla patrol around the Gulf of Oman and the Straits of Hormuz. Throughout 1981 and into 1982, Coventry took part in various exercises in home waters, culminating in her deployment as part of Exercise Springtrain '82 in March 1982. Once Springtrain '82 was complete, Coventry was scheduled to return to the UK prior to a deployment on an intelligence-gathering mission against Soviet naval forces in the Barents Sea, for which the ship had been fitted with special communications monitoring equipment.

=== Falklands campaign ===
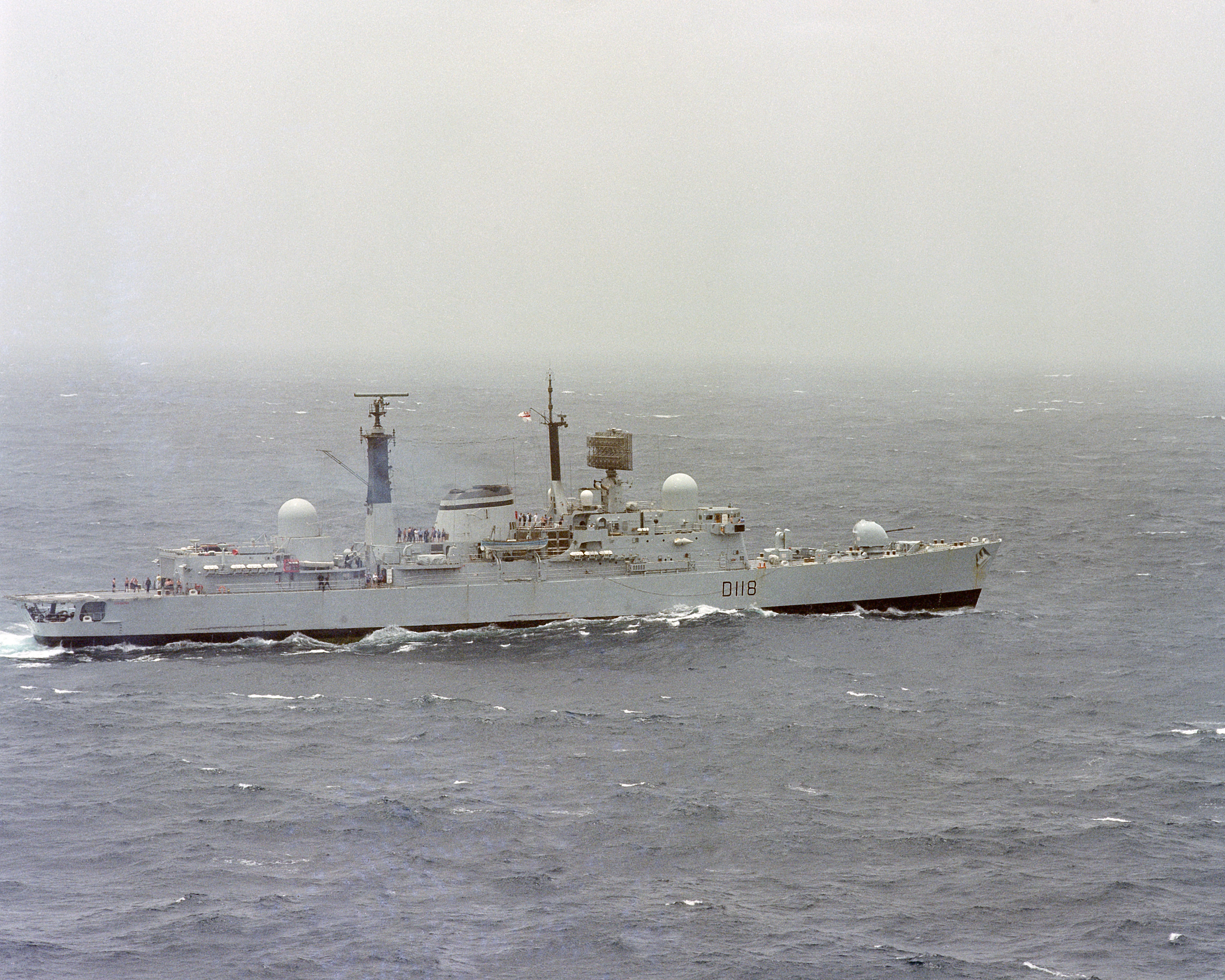
En route to the Falklands Islands in 1982

Coventry was taking part in Exercise Springtrain 82 near the British base of Gibraltar, during March 1982. Along with other vessels involved in the exercise she was detailed for service in the Falklands War. She had a Union Flag painted on the roof of her bridge and a black line painted through her funnel to her waterline to aid recognition, as the Argentines operated two Type 42 destroyers of their own. On 27 April, Coventry, in company with Glamorgan, Glasgow, Arrow and Sheffield, entered the Total Exclusion Zone, a 200-mile cordon declared around the Falkland Islands. Alongside Sheffield and Glasgow, Coventry would form the air defence vanguard for the aircraft carriers following behind.

Coventry's contribution to the Falklands War was considerable. Her helicopter was the first to fire Sea Skua air-to-surface anti-ship missiles in combat. Her Westland Lynx HAS.Mk.2 fired two Sea Skua missiles on 3 May at the Argentine fleet tug ARA Alferez Sobral (Note: formerly the USS Salish.), One missile missed and the other hit a small boat, knocking out the radio aerials and slightly injuring a crewman manning a 20 mm gun. Glasgow's Lynx fired two more Sea Skua, and the vessel retreated, with eight crew killed, eight wounded and heavy damage. The vessel remained in service in the Argentine Navy until 2018 and her damaged bridge is now on display at the Naval Museum in Tigre, Argentina.

Coventry was the first warship to fire Sea Dart surface-to-air missiles in anger when the ship fired three on 9 May at two Learjets of Escuadrón Fénix, just missing the aircraft. Broadsword reported that her radar tracked the missiles merging with the pair of contacts (call signs Litro and Pepe), but they missed the aircraft.

Coventry's captain, David Hart Dyke, claimed that two A-4C Skyhawks of Grupo 4 were shot down by Sea Darts (C-303 and C-313). However, both were actually lost to bad weather, and both wrecks were found on South Jason Island, one on the northwest side of the cliffs, the other in shallow waters on the southwest. Lt Casco and Lt Farias were both killed.

The first confirmed kill made by Coventry was an Aérospatiale Puma helicopter of 601 Assault Helicopter Battalion, shot down by a Sea Dart over Choiseul Sound, killing its three-man crew.

Coventry had been one of three Type 42 destroyers providing anti-aircraft cover for the fleet. With the loss of Sheffield and damage to Glasgow on 12 May, forcing her to return to the UK, Coventry was left to carry out the role alone, until other ships could arrive from the UK.

=== "Type 64" ===
Following the loss of Sheffield, a new air defence tactic was devised to try to maximise the task group's remaining assets. This saw the two remaining Type 42s paired with the two Type 22 frigates (a pairing unofficially termed Type 64) and deployed much further ahead of the main force in an effort to draw attacking aircraft away from the carriers. The idea was that in the event of Sea Dart being unable to function, the short range Sea Wolf advanced point defence missile fitted to the frigates could be used. In this, Coventry was paired with Broadsword.

=== 25 May 1982 ===
On 25 May 1982, Coventry and Broadsword were ordered to take up position to the north-west of Falkland Sound. There she would act as a decoy to draw Argentinian aircraft away from other ships at San Carlos Bay. Captain Hart Dyke knew it was a suicide mission: "I realised why we were doing it. If necessary, we were the sacrifice rather than other ships which were more important." In this position, close to land, with not enough open sea between her and the coast, her Sea Dart missiles would be less effective. Broadsword was armed with the Sea Wolf missile, which is for short range anti-aircraft and anti-missile use.

At first, the trap worked, with FAA A-4B Skyhawk C-244 of Grupo 5 shot down north of Pebble Island by a Sea Dart. Pilot Capitán Hugo Ángel del Valle Palaver was killed. Later a FAA A-4C Skyhawk coded C-304 of Grupo 4 de Caza deployed to San Julian was shot down north east of Pebble Island by another Sea Dart while returning from a mission to San Carlos Water. Capitán Jorge Osvaldo García successfully ejected but was not recovered from the water. His body was washed ashore in a dinghy at Golding Island in 1983. Garcia's wingman, Lieutenant Ricardo Lucero, was also shot down by the combined San Carlos air defences. Teniente Lucero ejected, and was recovered by Fearless.

The two ships then came under attack by two waves of two Argentine Douglas A-4 Skyhawks. The first wave carried one 1,000 lb free-fall bomb each while the aircraft of the second carried 3 x 250 kg bombs. The four Skyhawks flew so low that Coventry's targeting radar could not distinguish between them and the land and failed to lock on. Broadsword attempted to target the first pair of attackers (Captain Pablo Carballo and Lieutenant Carlos Rinke) with her Sea Wolf missile system, but her own tracking system locked down during the attack and could not be reset before the aircraft released their bombs.

Of the bombs released, one bounced off the sea and struck Broadsword's flight deck and, though it failed to explode, wrecked the ship's Westland Lynx helicopter. Coventry claimed to have hit the second Skyhawk (Captain Pablo Marcos Carballo) in the tail with small arms fire, although the aircraft returned safely to Argentina. Carballo's plane was hit under the right wing by a piece of shrapnel, on his way in, which pierced his aircraft's right fuel tank.

The second pair of Skyhawks (First Lieutenant Mariano Ángel Velasco and Ensign Jorge Nelson Barrionuevo), headed for Coventry 90 seconds later at a 20-degree angle to her port bow. Still unable to gain a missile lock, Coventry launched a Sea Dart missile in an attempt to distract them and turned hard to starboard to reduce her profile. On Broadsword the Sea Wolf system had been reset and successfully acquired the attacking aircraft, but was unable to fire as Coventry's turn took her directly into the line of fire.

Coventry used her 4.5-inch gun and small arms against the attacking aircraft. The port Oerlikon 20 mm cannon jammed, leaving the ship with only rifles and machine guns to defend herself. Coventry was struck by three bombs just above the water line on the port side. One of the bombs exploded beneath the computer room, destroying it and the nearby operations room, incapacitating almost all senior officers. The other entered the forward engine room, exploding beneath the junior ratings dining room where the first aid party was stationed, and the ship immediately began listing to port. The latter hit caused critical damage as it breached the bulkhead between the forward and aft engine rooms, exposing the largest open space in the ship to uncontrollable flooding. Given the design of the ship, with multiple watertight compartments, two hits virtually anywhere else might have been just survivable. The third bomb did not explode.

Within 20 minutes Coventry had been abandoned and had completely capsized. Coventry sank shortly after. Nineteen of her crew were killed and a further 30 injured. One of the wounded, Paul Mills, suffered complications from a skull fracture sustained in the sinking of the ship and later died on 29 March 1983; he is buried in his home town of Swavesey, Cambridgeshire. After the ship was struck, her crew, waiting to be rescued, sang "Always Look on the Bright Side of Life" from Monty Python's Life of Brian.

Broadsword subsequently rescued 170 of Coventry's crew.

== Tributes ==
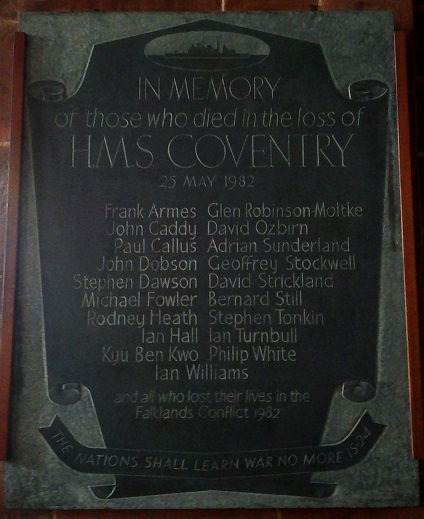
Memorial to the dead of HMS Coventry in Holy Trinity Church, Coventry

Crew members of Coventry were mentioned-in-dispatches and received commendations. CPO Aircrewman M J Tupper of No.846 NAS was awarded a Distinguished Service Medal for his part in the rescue. After the war, a cross to commemorate crew members who lost their lives was erected on Pebble Island.

David Hart Dyke, Coventry's commanding officer during the Falklands War, wrote about the ship's tale in his book Four Weeks in May: The Loss of HMS Coventry. This was adapted by the BBC into a documentary Sea of Fire, with dramatised sequences and shown in June 2007. In 2011 it was announced that a feature-length film would be produced based on Four Weeks in May, to be written and directed by Tom Shankland. The documentary television series Seconds from Disaster featured the attack on the Coventry in the episode "Sinking the Coventry" in December 2012.

The wreck site is a controlled site under the Protection of Military Remains Act. Five months after Coventry sank, a RN Fleet Diving Team conducted an underwater survey of the wreck, which they found lying on her port side in approximately 100 metres (330 ft) of water. This survey was the beginning of Operation Blackleg, a series of dives to recover classified documentation and equipment and to make the remaining weapons safe by means of explosive demolition. The dive team recovered several personal items belonging to Hart Dyke and other officers along with the ship's battle ensign, later presented to the next Coventry, a Type 22 frigate. The divers also recovered the Cross of Nails, originally presented to the ship by Coventry Cathedral. This too was loaned to the new Coventry, until her decommissioning in 2002, when it returned to the cathedral. The Cross is now carried on board HMS Diamond (D34), a Type 45 destroyer.

There is a memorial plaque to the dead of HMS Coventry at Holy Trinity Church, Coventry.

== Appearances in Media ==
The ship appears in the book Black Swan Green by David Mitchell, in which one of the minor characters is killed during the Falklands War, who was a crewman on the ship.
