= Chapel of Reconciliation =

Place of worship in Berlin, Germany

Coordinates: 52°32′09″N 13°23′31″E

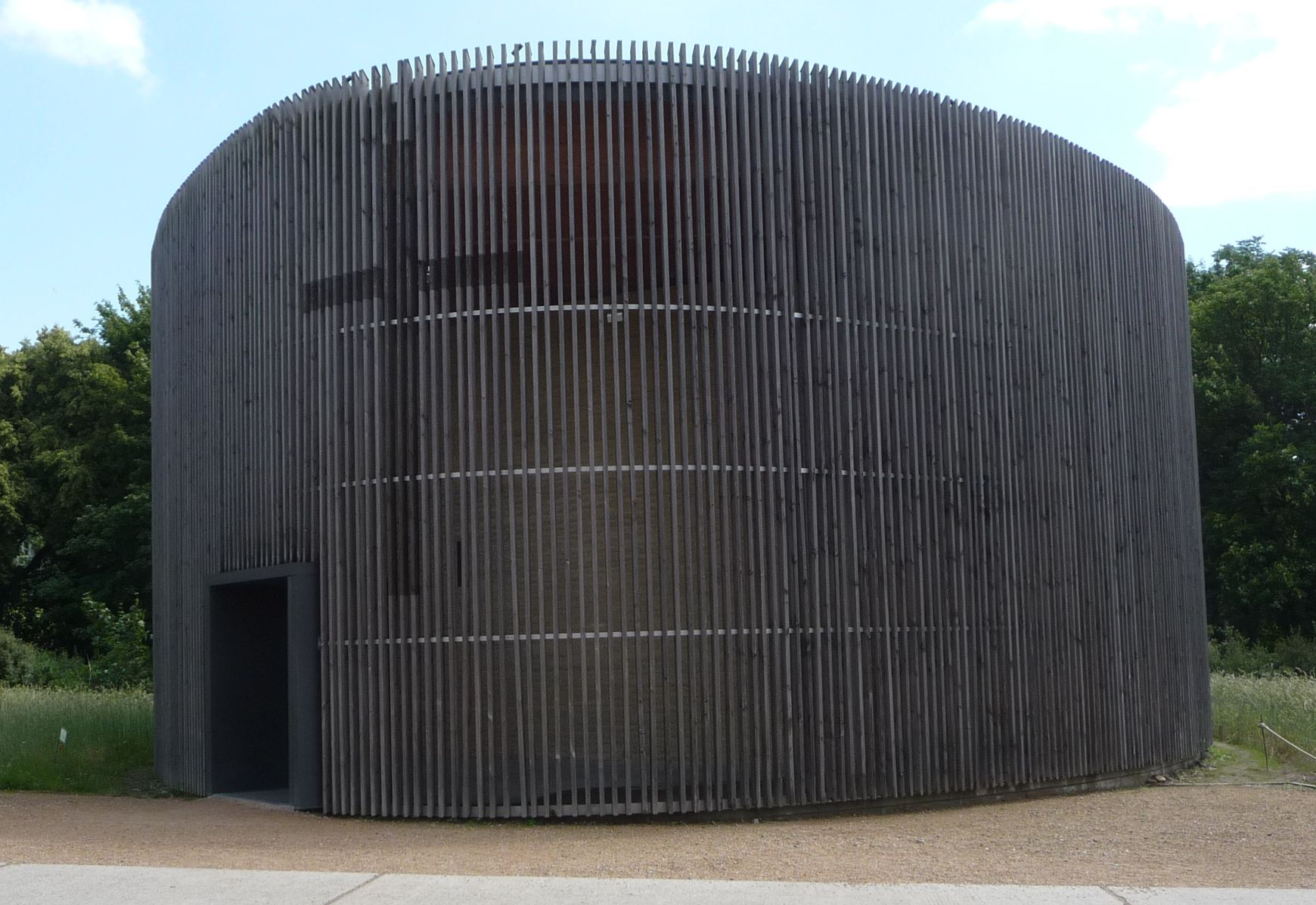
The present-day Chapel of Reconciliation

The Chapel of Reconciliation (German: Kapelle der Versöhnung) is a place of worship in Berlin, Germany. It stands on the site of the old Church of Reconciliation (de) (German: Versöhnungskirche), on Bernauer Strasse in the Mitte district.

== Church of Reconciliation ==
The church was completed in 1894 as an imposing brick-built building by the architect Gotthilf Ludwig Möckel, in the Gothic revival style. It sustained some damage in the Second World War, and still had a deactivated American bomb in the basement discovered during its reconstruction in 1999, but the church survived the war.

With the Division of Berlin in 1945, the church building found itself within the Soviet sector, with most of the parishioners in the neighbouring French sector. This meant that when the Berlin Wall was constructed in 1961, it ran directly in front of the church on its western side and behind it on the eastern side, preventing access to everyone except the border guards, who used its tower as an observation post. Snipers often shot at escapees from the church’s tower.

The church building was demolished in 1985 in order ‘to increase the security, order and cleanliness on the state border with West Berlin’ according to the official justification by the East German (GDR) government. The cross on the tower fell off the church when it was blown up and the members of the church hid it from the Soviets until the end of the Cold War. Four years later in 1989, the Wall fell.

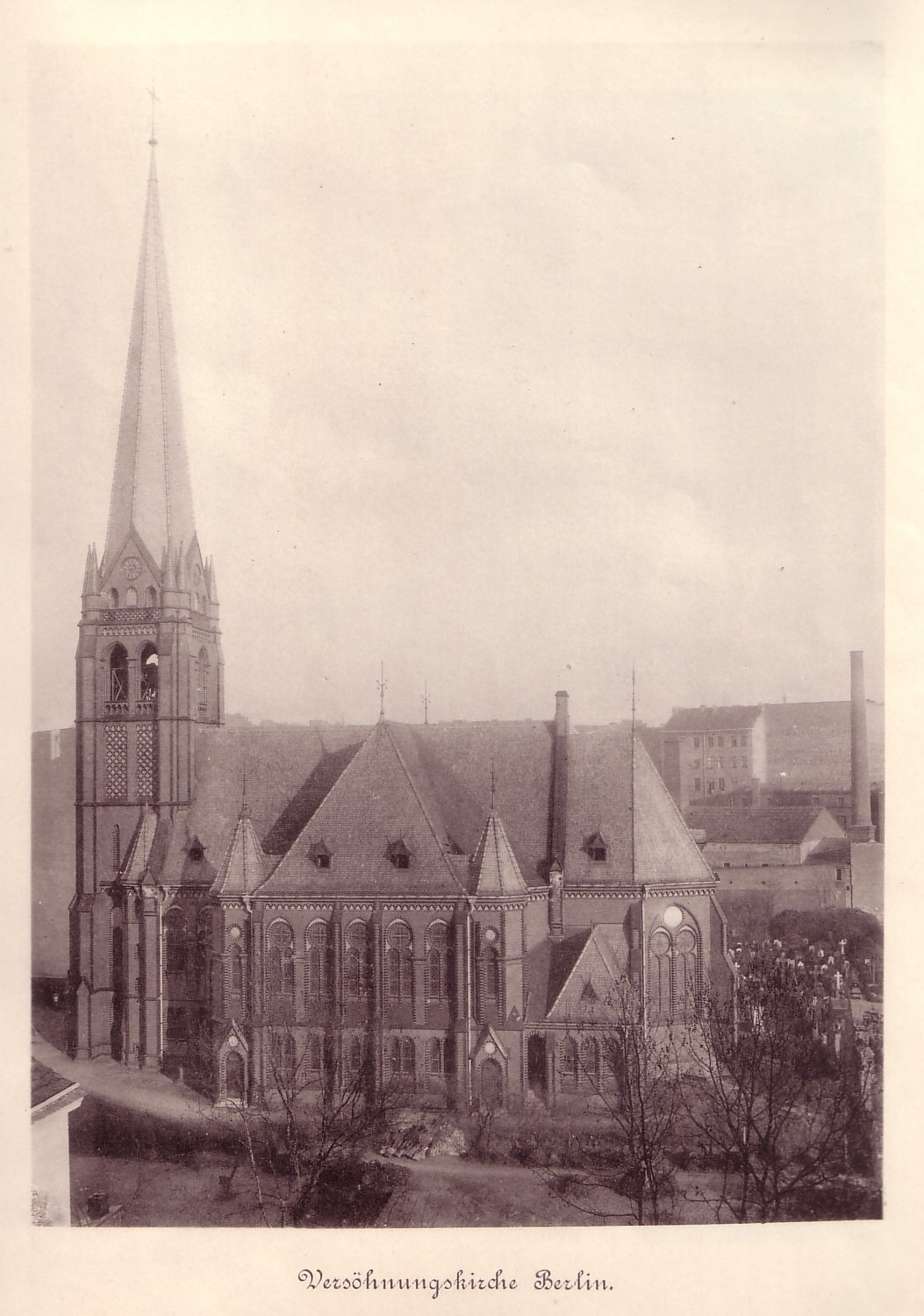
The Church of Reconciliation, pictured in 1899

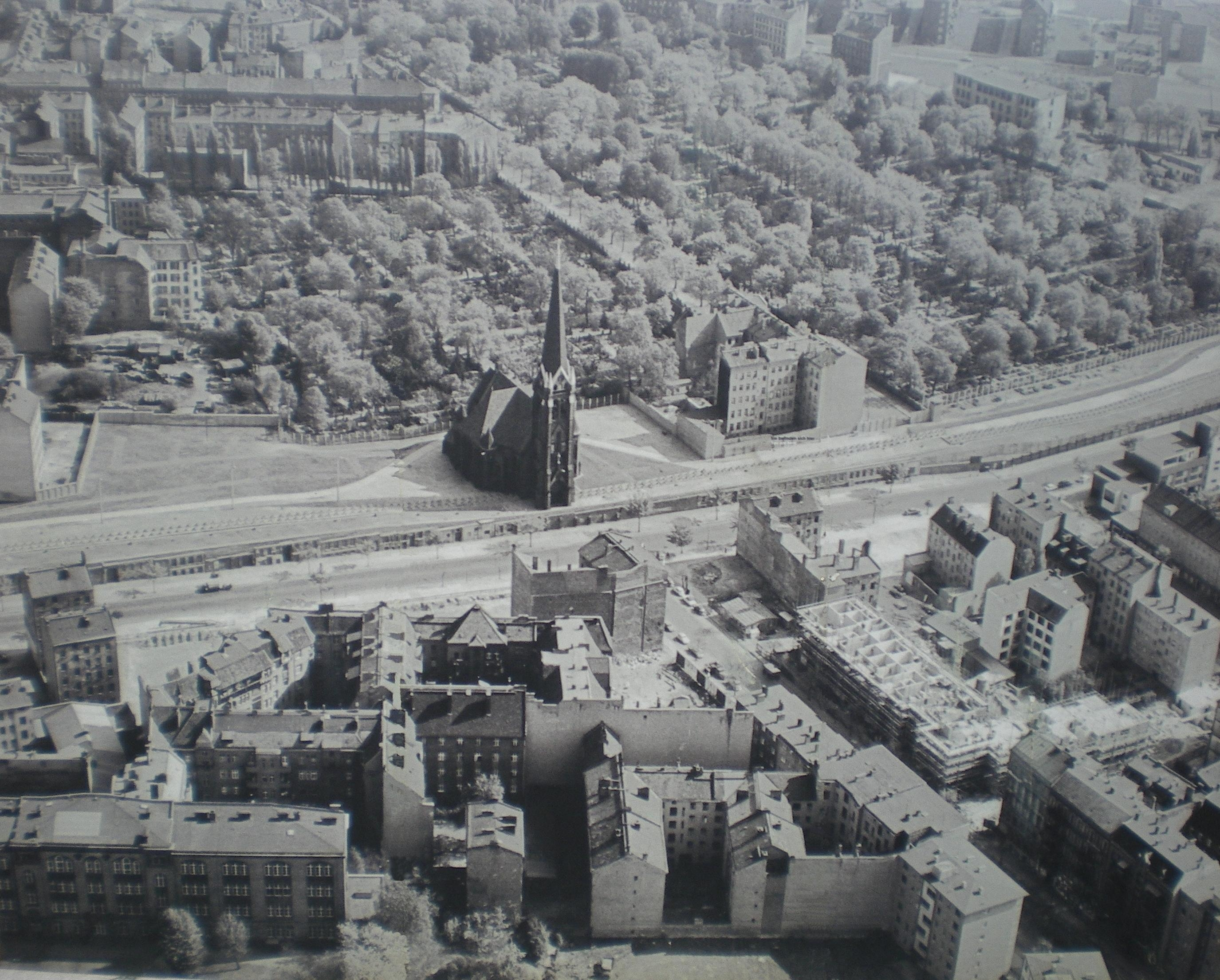
The church, and the border zone: aerial view, 1970

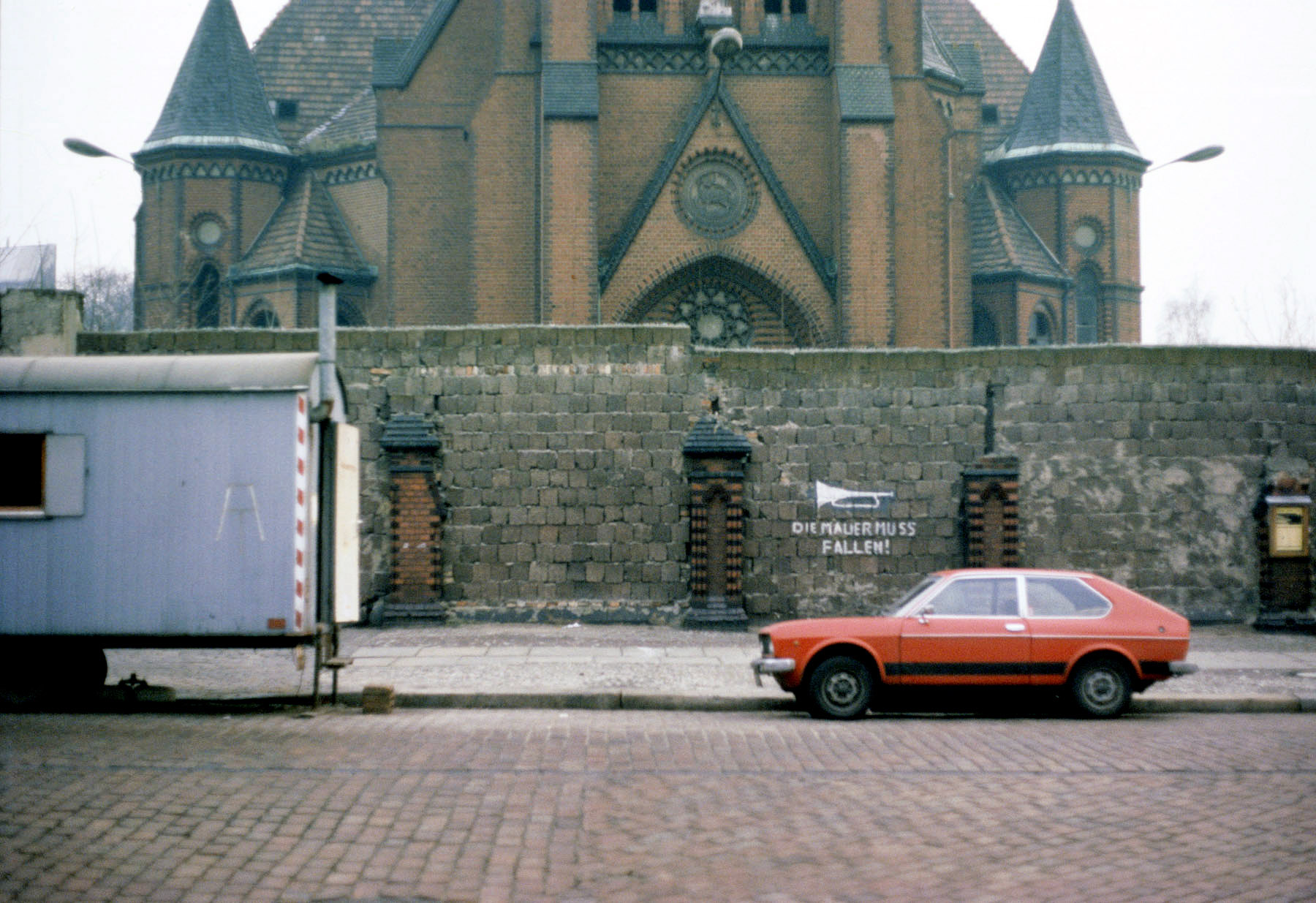
The church as it appeared in 1978

== The rebuilding project ==
In the summer of 1990 the removal of the border fortifications began, leaving the land where the Church of Reconciliation had once stood overgrown with grass and shrubs. While the general trend was to get rid of the physical evidence of Berlin’s division, the Reconciliation Parish considered the most suitable use for the site, in a way that commemorated its past whilst looking towards the future. The result was to build a chapel on the site; a modern construction that considered ecological and historical concerns as well as the needs of its parishioners.

The Berlin architects Rudolf Reitermann and Peter Sassenroth were commissioned to design the chapel. Wooden columns were used for the outer oval wall, which recreates the shape of the chapel’s predecessor and the inner oval of the chapel is made from pressed clay and follows the usual east–west orientation of churches. The chapel was constructed in 1999 under the leadership of the Austrian clay artist Martin Rauch. Volunteers from Open Houses (a German charity founded in 1989 that specialises in preserving endangered historical monuments in east Germany, with the help of foreign volunteers) came from fourteen eastern and western European countries to support the building project. To construct the walls, 30 cm of moist clay was put into position and then compressed by 8 cm, giving the wall’s structure its strength. Within the clay, pieces of stone and even glass are visible and these came from the rubble of the previous church. It is the first clay-built public building to be built for over 150 years in Germany and the first clay-built German church. On 9 November 2000, on the eleventh anniversary of the fall of the Berlin Wall, the Chapel of Reconciliation was consecrated.

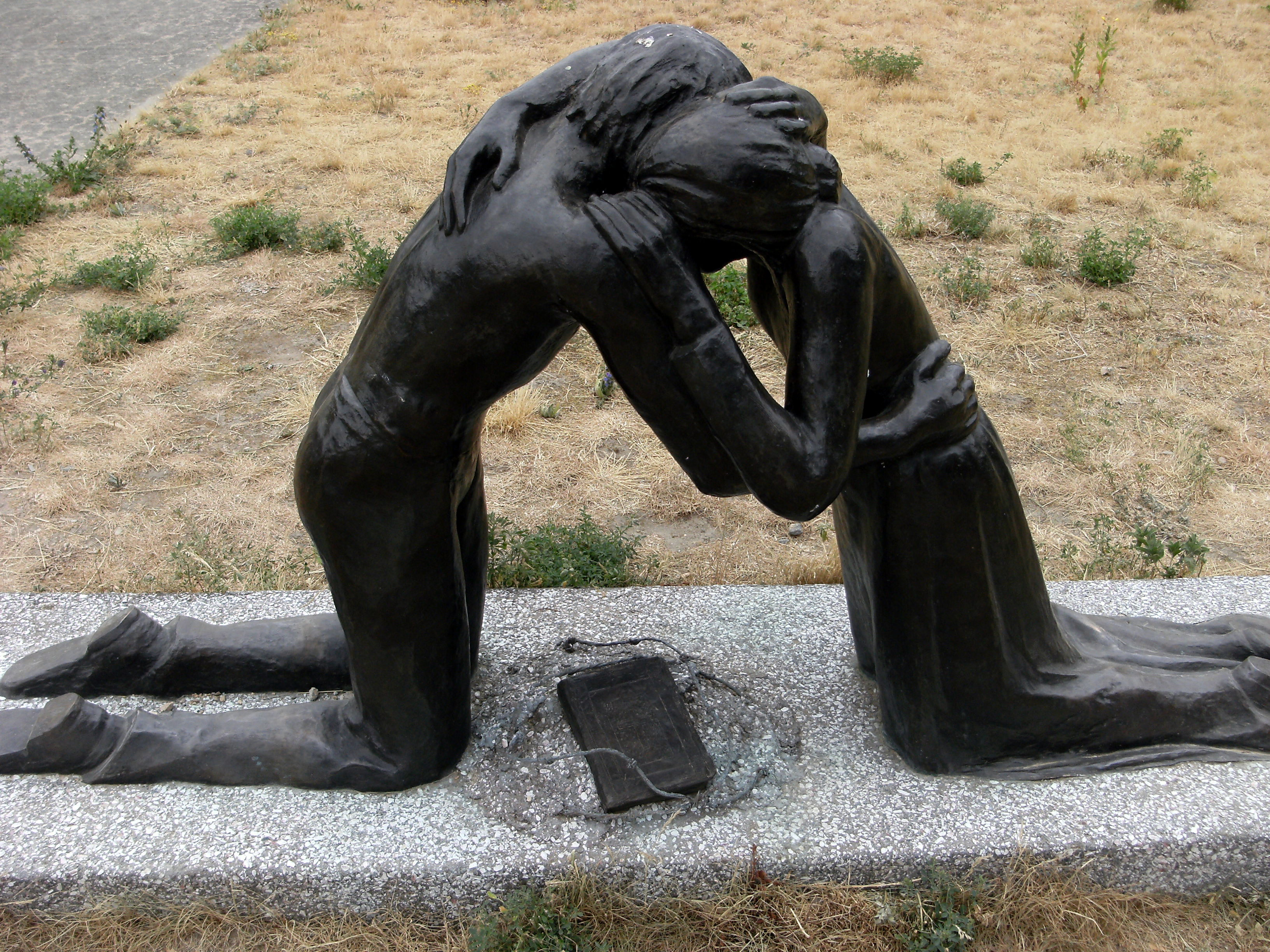
Statue of reconciliation

The chapel unites architectural and ecological modernity with remembrance, standing as a triumph against its predecessor's destruction. Its memorial and reconciliation roles are recognised by the chapel being part of Berlin Wall Memorial (Gedenkstaette Berliner Mauer) and with it being included in Coventry Cathedral’s Community of the Cross of Nails: a world symbol for reconciliation and peace. The chapel also has a replica of Coventry Cathedral’s Statue of Reconciliation, a gift of the Cathedral found in Hiroshima and Belfast too – also places emerging from the destructiveness of war.

After helping with the construction, Open Houses has continued its involvement with the chapel. Every year volunteers from around the world work at the chapel and help the parish with their work.

== Gallery ==
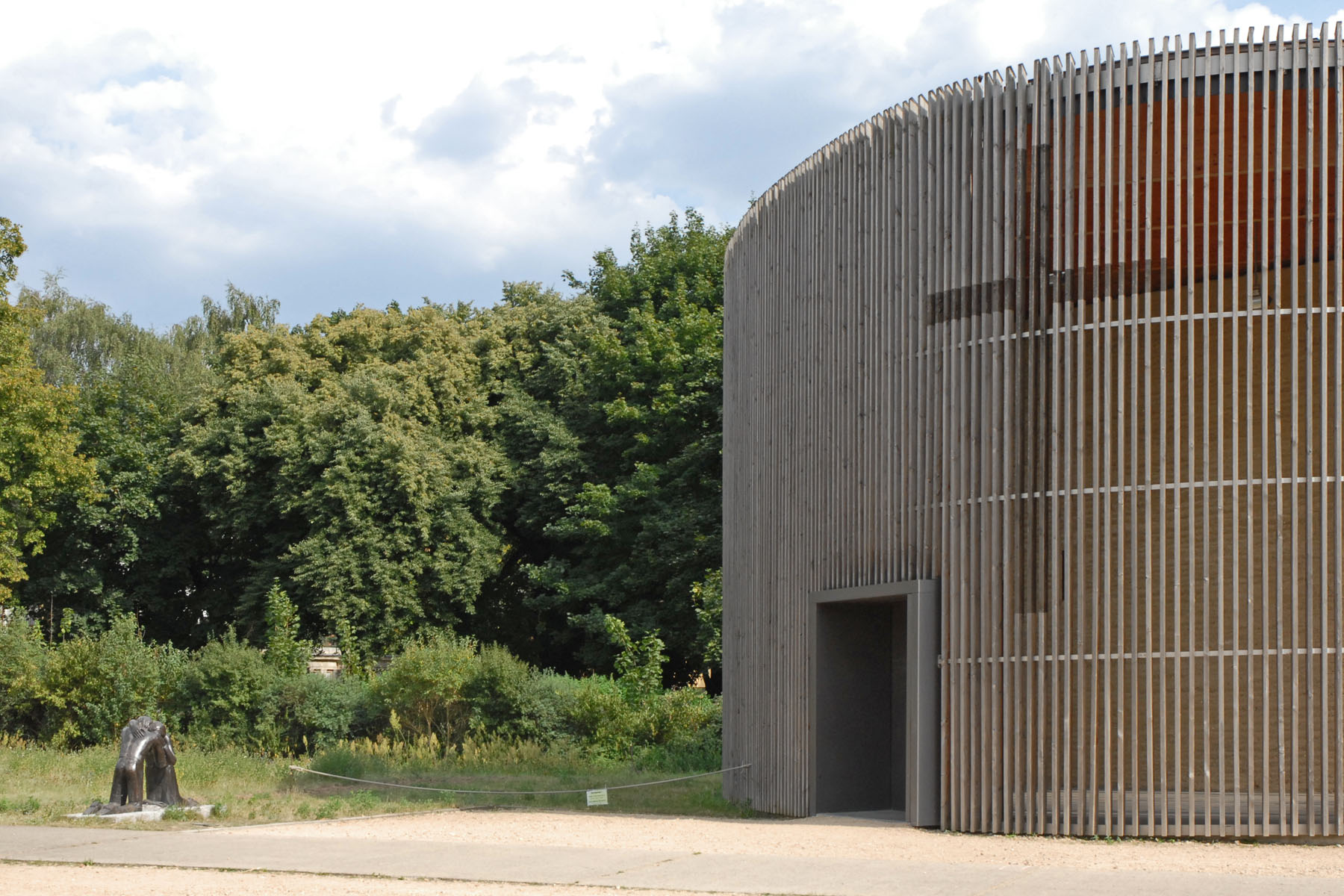
Exterior of the chapel

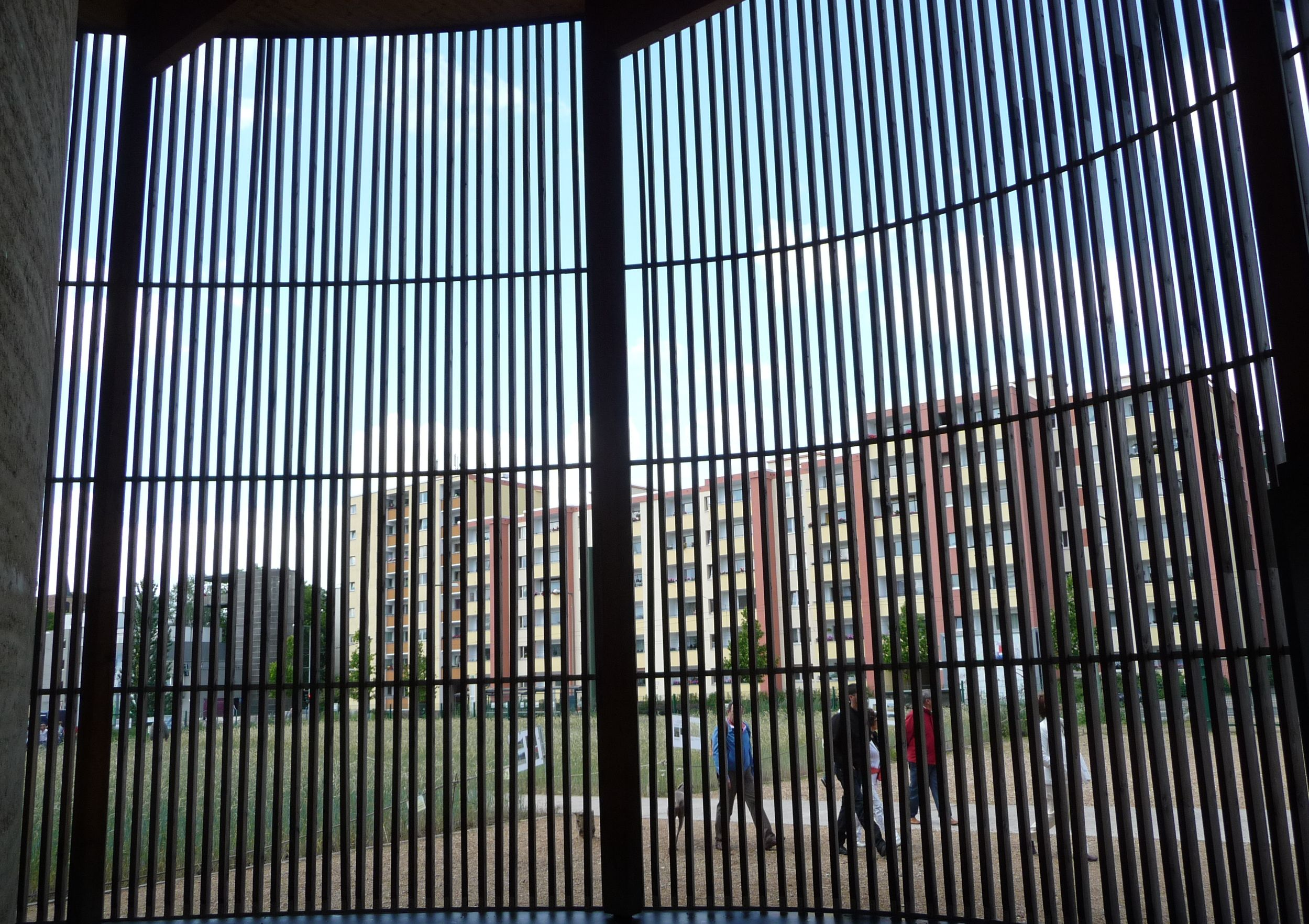
View from within the outer chapel wall

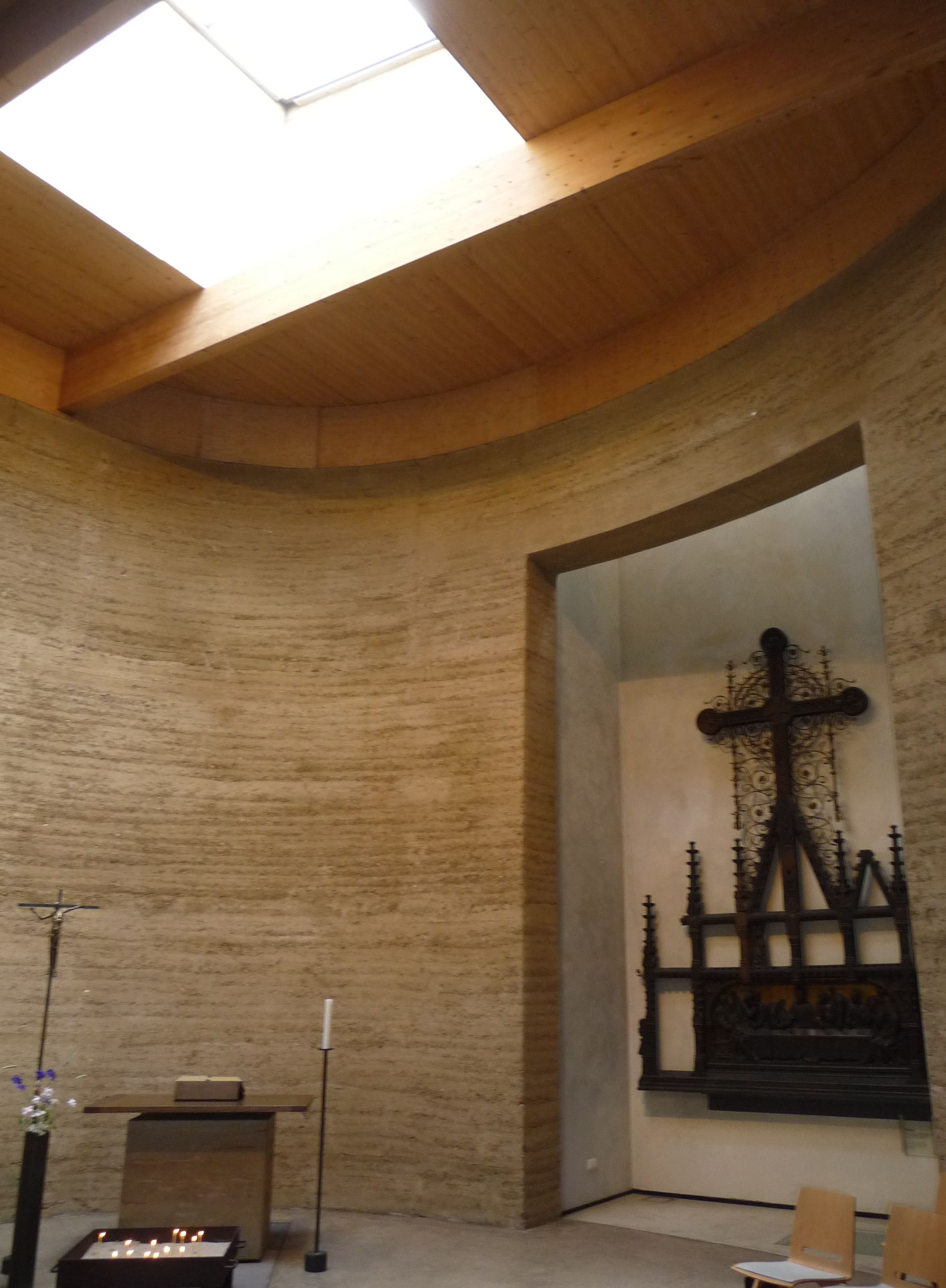
Interior of the chapel

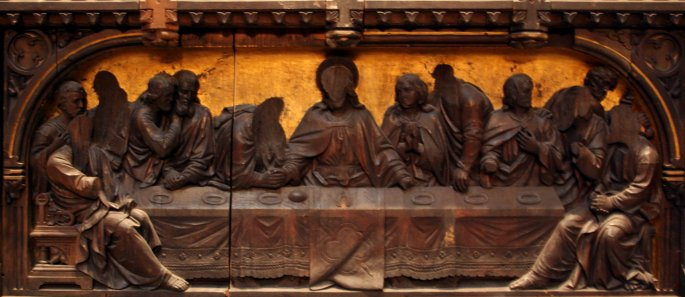
Detail of the altarpiece

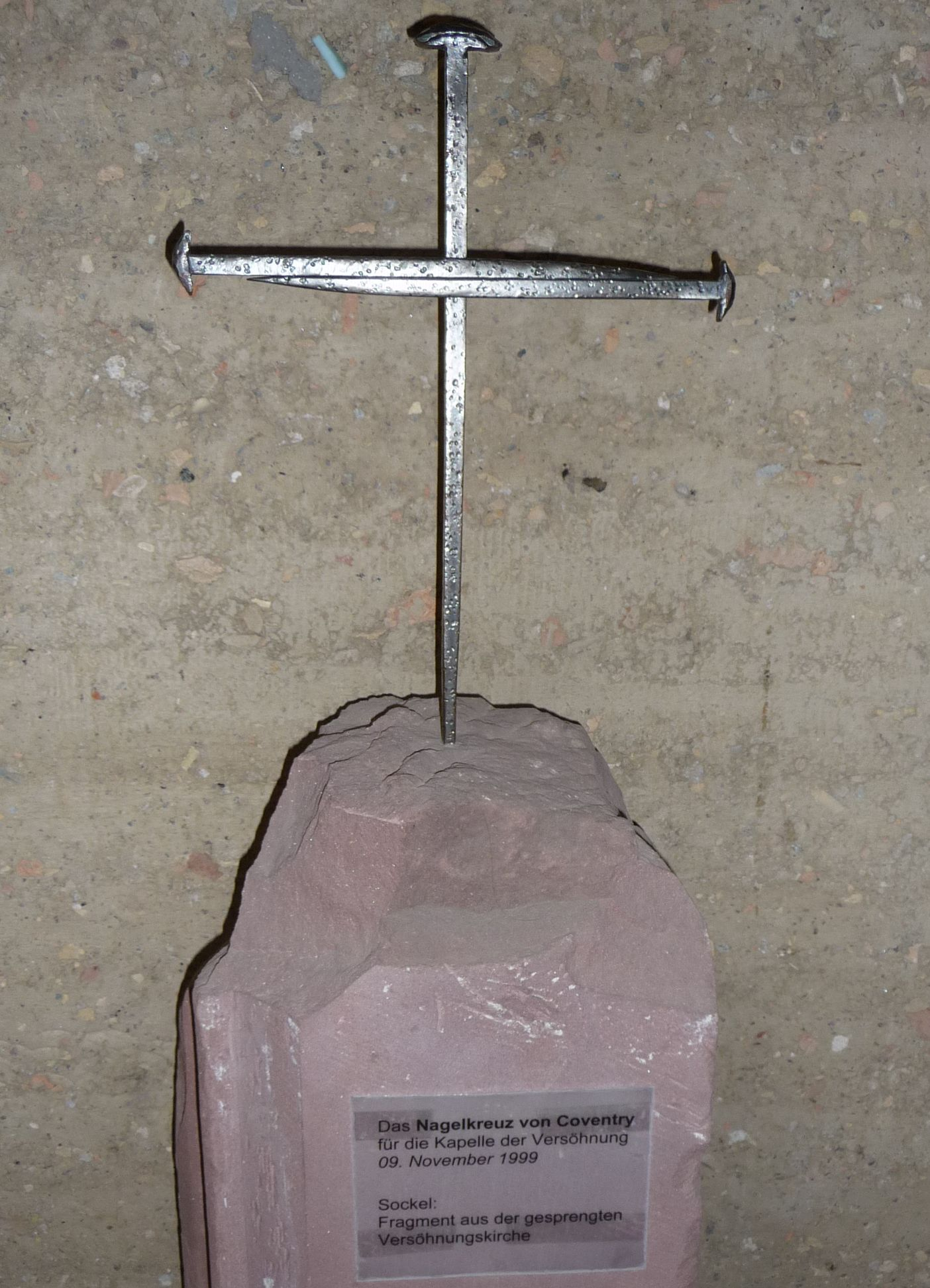
Chapel's replica of the Coventry Cross of Nails

== See also ==
- List of deaths at the Berlin Wall
