= Operation Blackleg =

British naval mission

Operation Blackleg, from 16 September 1982 – 28 January 1983, was the code name for the recovery of NATO-sensitive equipment and documents from the sunken wreck of HMS Coventry, a Type 42 destroyer of the Royal Navy, sunk by Argentine Air Force A-4 Skyhawk aircraft on 25 May 1982, during the Falklands War. Royal Navy clearance divers from the Saturation Diving and Deep Trails Team based at HMS Vernon under the Command of Lt. Cdr M.D Kooner formed Naval Party 2200.

== Background ==
The wreck of the Royal Navy vessel HMS Coventry, sunk during Falklands War operations is 21 kilometres (13 mi) north of West Falkland Island. Coventry rests on the port side at a depth of over 100 metres (330 ft) on the seabed. Fleet Clearance Diving Team (2) led by Fleet Chief Diver John Dadd which had served during Operation Corporate was to be flown back to the United Kingdom a few days after the Argentine surrender. These Royal Navy clearance divers were to form up the central part of Operation Blackleg team.

Operation Blackleg was the code name given to the Royal Navy's mission to recover NATO sensitive cryptographic equipment and Top Secret documentation that was still on board when Coventry sank. Lieutenant Commander Mike Kooner led Operation Blackleg on board the chartered ship, DSV Stena Seaspread, which during the Falklands War had been the prime battle damage repair ship and now would function in the ship's main task as a saturation diving vessel.

The Ministry of Defence was concerned that the loss of Coventry posed a significant risk that the ship's communication systems, top secret documents, weapon guidance systems, and armaments could be salvaged by a hostile country threatening to set back NATO by decades. Accordingly, based at HMS Vernon, Portsmouth, the Royal Navy's Deep Trails and Saturation Team formed NP 2200 and were to sail South to West Falkland Island on the morning of 16 September 1982.

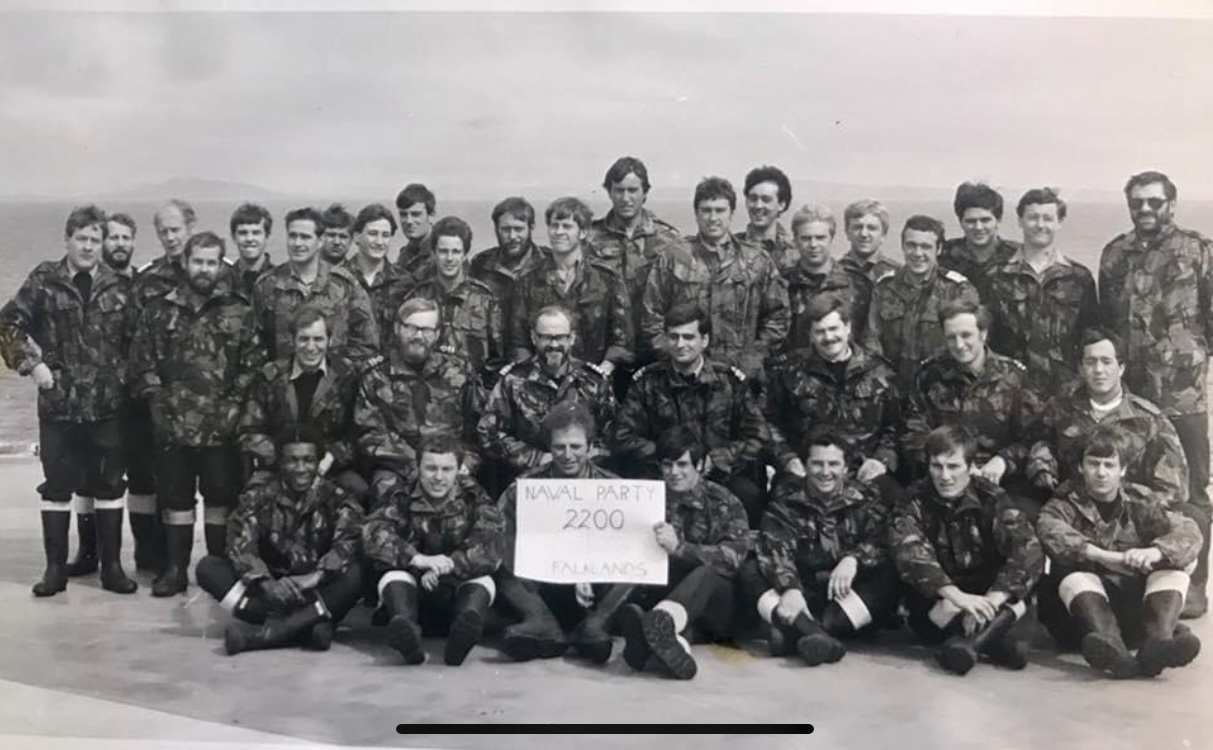
Operation Blackleg Clearance Diving Team and support crew onboard DSV Stena Seaspread, 1982

== Diving operations ==
The salvage operations consisted of five dives. Dive 001 was relatively shallow to test the saturation diving system. Dive 005 was a surveillance dive led by Lt Cdr Mike Kooner to assess the work the other teams had completed. Dive 005 was completed in only a few days with a total water time of 17 hours. On 13 October, Operation Blackleg and Dive 002 was the first team of divers to enter the hyperbaric saturation chambers and be pressed down to a storage depth of 75 metres (246 ft), with a maximum working depth of 100 metres (330 ft).

=== Dive 002 ===
The team was tasked with setting up Coventry as a safe working environment. This included placing transponders on the seabed for Stena Seaspread's dynamic positioning system. Dive 002's main objective was to gain entry into the Main Communications Office (MCO) and the Electronic Warfare Office (EWO) within the MCO. An area to gain access was marked out on the starboard side of the ship's hull. Coxes Bolt Gun was used to punch holes to allow trapped gases to vent off to the surrounding ocean, followed by cutting sections of the ship's hull using oxy-arc equipment. Leading Diver Jenrick was on the ship's hull, clearing up the dive site due to a forecast of inclement weather. Stena Seaspread's dynamic positioning computers crashed, resulting in a run-off pulling Jenrick through the water with some force. Jenrick made his way back to the safety of the diving bell. CPO Diver Limbrick BEM, recovered the battle ensign using Coventry's halyards. The ensign flag was eventually returned to Captain David Hart-Dyke, the commanding officer of HMS Coventry, during the Falklands War.

On 31 October, the dive team entered Coventry's MCO and EWO. Leading Diver Martin Davies was the first diver to enter the wreck. Equipment and publications were recovered and sent topside for cataloguing. Both the MCO and EWO were assessed as all necessary items were recovered.

Diver Paul Tudor was the only Able Seaman diver given special permission from Superintendent of Diving to dive on HMS Coventry.

=== Dive 003 ===
On 10 November, six divers were compressed into the hyperbaric living chamber. Dive 003's main aim was to enter and recover all MoD items from the Operations Room (OR) and Computer Room (CR). The area on Coventry's hull was identified, gases vented, and oxy-arc cutting commenced.

Leading Diver Chris David, cutting into the wreck, suffered an underwater blowback. The explosion ruptured both eardrums. David was decompressed and medically evacuated. Replaced by Leading Diver Kevan Daber.

Leading Diver Steve Clegg also experienced a blowback in a separate incident. Unlike David, he was wearing a hard-diving helmet, a Superlite 17. The explosion was to crack Clegg's polycarbonate faceplate. Clegg suffered no physical injury and was awarded a Commander-in-Chief's Commendation for Brave Conduct.

On 19 November, the three-person dive team of Petty Officer Diver Micheal Harrison, Leading Divers Ray Sinclair and Graham Wilson (bellman) was tasked with moving a member of the ship's company who was lying across the doorway, blocking access to the passageway leading to the Computer Room (CR). The deceased sailor was moved deeper to his final resting place. Harrison made his way along the passage to the CR and retrieved the cryptographic tapes. Harrison became entangled and stuck when returning to where Sinclair was stationed inside the ship's lobby. Harrison was trapped between the ship's side and a computer console that had moved during the Coventry's sinking. Wires and cabling had wrapped around his diving helmet and bail-out bottle. Sinclair, via dive Control, was instructed to make his way along the passage to where Harrison was trapped and free him. Having removed the cabling and freed Harrison, Sinclair took the cryptographic tapes, and Harrison returned to recover the final MOD items. Harrison was awarded a Queen's Gallantry Medal.

Canadian Lt Charles Edwards and Leading Diver Kevan Daber entered Captain Hart-Dyke's cabin. They cleared the compartment to allow the following dive team to access the Captain's safe and recover highly classified documents. Edwards and Daber also located and recovered the "Cross of Nails", a result of the World War II bombing of the Coventry Cathedral by the German Luftwaffe. Sinclair used oxy-arc after failing to open the safe by the combination lock. Sinclair recovered all classified documents along with Hart-Dykes family silver, including two George II candlesticks.

=== Dive 004 ===
The primary objective of Dive 004 was to recover classified documents from the remaining compartments: the 909 office, Captain's Bridge, and CB Store. Using the access cut by Dive 003, the divers entered the CB store and successfully cleared the compartment. The Communications store contained only bunting and no classified materials.

Leading Diver Gale entered the Operations Room via a large hole blasted into the wreck by charges placed from dive 003, successfully cutting away pipes blocking access; Gale reported extensive battle damage and no sign of safes containing classified materials. Leading Diver Jenrick re-entered the Operations Room, encountering several large consoles that were loose and unstable. He recovered the last of the few loose publications. The Operation Room was deemed successfully cleared, and no further investigation by divers was needed. Leading Diver Bean re-enters the Computer Room, recovering a few items; the compartment is declared cleared. On 13 December, the divers found a route into the 909 Office. The safes were opened and cleared using a crowbar, chisel, and hammer. This was to complete the internal tasks of Operation Blackleg. All classified materials are recovered, and the operation moves to the final phases, ordnance clearance and aerials. Three demolition charges were placed on the Sea Skua magazine, the torpedo Body Room, and over the second steering position. Plastic explosive packs were placed around the base of the 965 "bedstead" aerial, successfully blowing the aerial of the mast, which was stropped and recovered. On the final dive of 004, the team attached 4lb plastic explosive packs to unarmed Sea Dart missiles remaining in the magazine.

=== Dive 005 ===
With the Senior Naval Officer in saturation to survey the tasks successfully carried out by Dive teams 002, 003, and 004, FCPO Diver John Dadd, a clearance diver, was now the Senior Diving officer. FCPO Dadd was also in charge of all demolitions throughout Operation Blackleg. Saturation Dive 005 was short dive lasting only three days plus decompression. The team placed demolition charges on the remaining Sea Dart missiles. The final dive excursion of Operation Blackleg was to survey the charges that successfully destroyed the missiles. As an act of remembrance to the deceased sailors, a White Ensign was placed on Coventry.
