= St. Nikolai, Kiel =

St. Nikolai
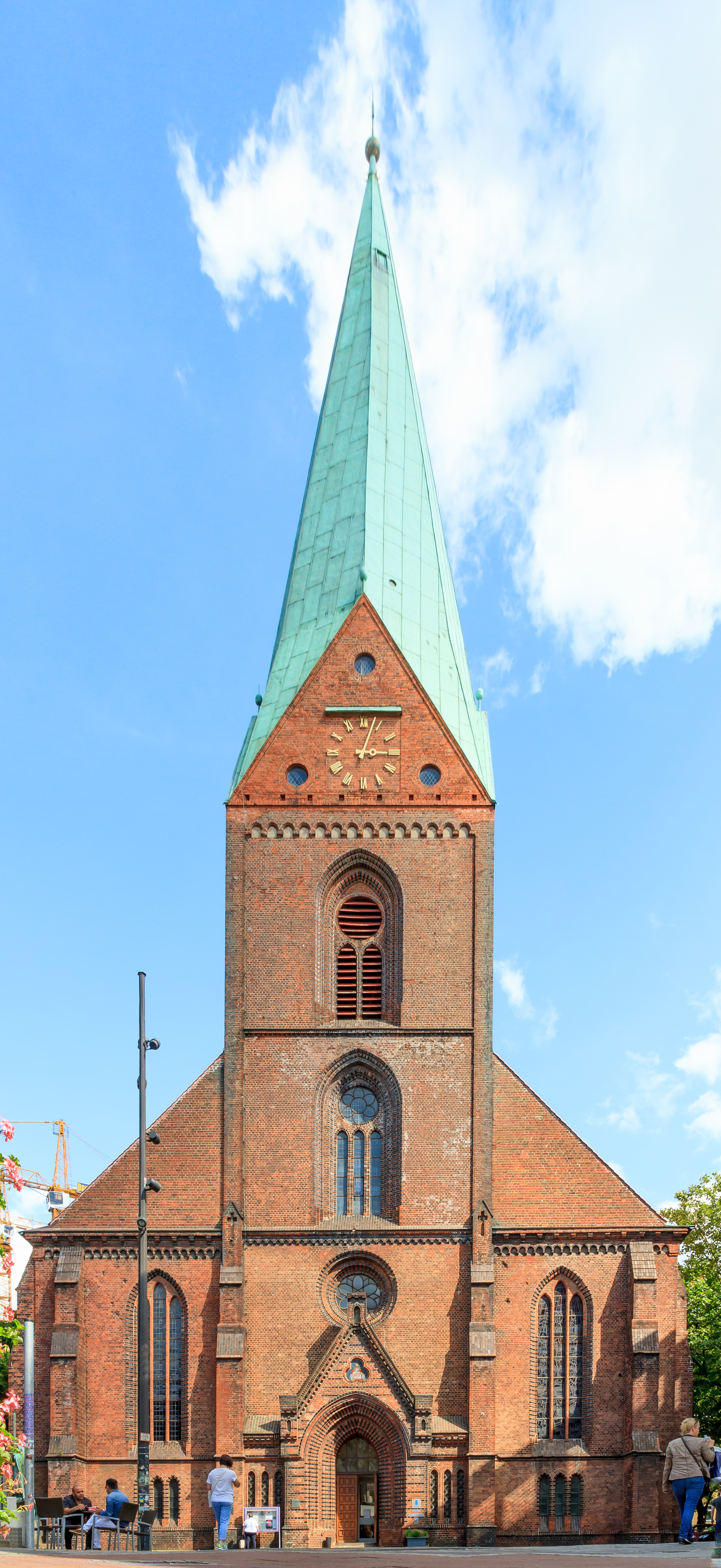
- St. Nikolai
- 54°19′22″N 10°08′24″E
- Location: Kiel, Schleswig-Holstein
- Country: Germany
- Denomination: Lutheran
- Previous denomination: Roman Catholic
- Website: www.st-nikolai-kiel.de

Architecture
- Architectural type: hall church
- Style: Gothic
- Completed: 1242

St. Nikolai is the name of a Protestant parish and its church in Kiel, the capital of Schleswig-Holstein, Germany. It is the town's oldest building, at the Alter Markt. It was dedicated to Saint Nicholas. In the 19th century, it was remodeled in Gothic Revival style. Destroyed in World War II, it was rebuilt with a simpler contemporary interior. It features notable artworks such as a bronze baptismal font from 1340, an altar from 1460, a triumphal cross from 1490, a wood-carved pulpit from 1705, and outside a bronze by Ernst Barlach from 1928.

== History ==
The building was begun shortly after the foundation of the town by Adolf IV of Schauenburg and Holstein, c. 1242. The church is first mentioned in a document of 1246, dedicated to Saint Nicholas, the patron saint of seafarers and merchants. The original Gothic hall church was changed hundred years later, following the model of St. Petri, by adding a long choir, and building three naves. The steeple was connected to the church by the annex of chapels.

In 1526, Marquard Schuldorp (1495–1529) introduced the Reformation.

From 1877 to 1884, the church was remodeled in Gothic Revival style, including a new facade and a flatter roof. The funeral chapels from the 17th century were demolished. Inside, the Lettner, balconies and seating were removed. Reception of the changes were mixed.

In World War II, the church was badly damaged by bombing on 22 May 1944. The interior features had been removed. The church was completely demolished because the ruin was unstable. It was rebuilt from 1950 by Gerhard Langmaack who turned to modern forms and construction, such as concrete columns and ceiling. The interior was remodeled by Peter Kahlcke in an "unpretentious" style, faithful to Langmaack's concept, and completed in 1986.

== Gallery ==
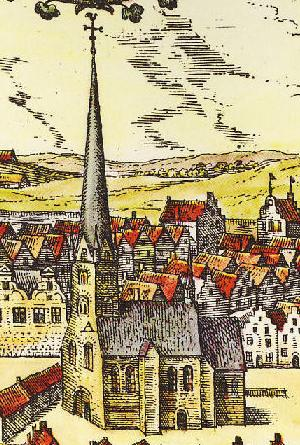
1588

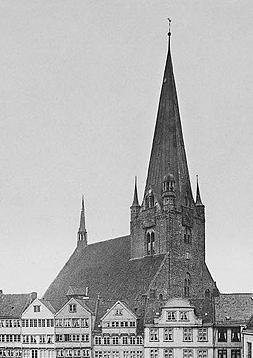
1868

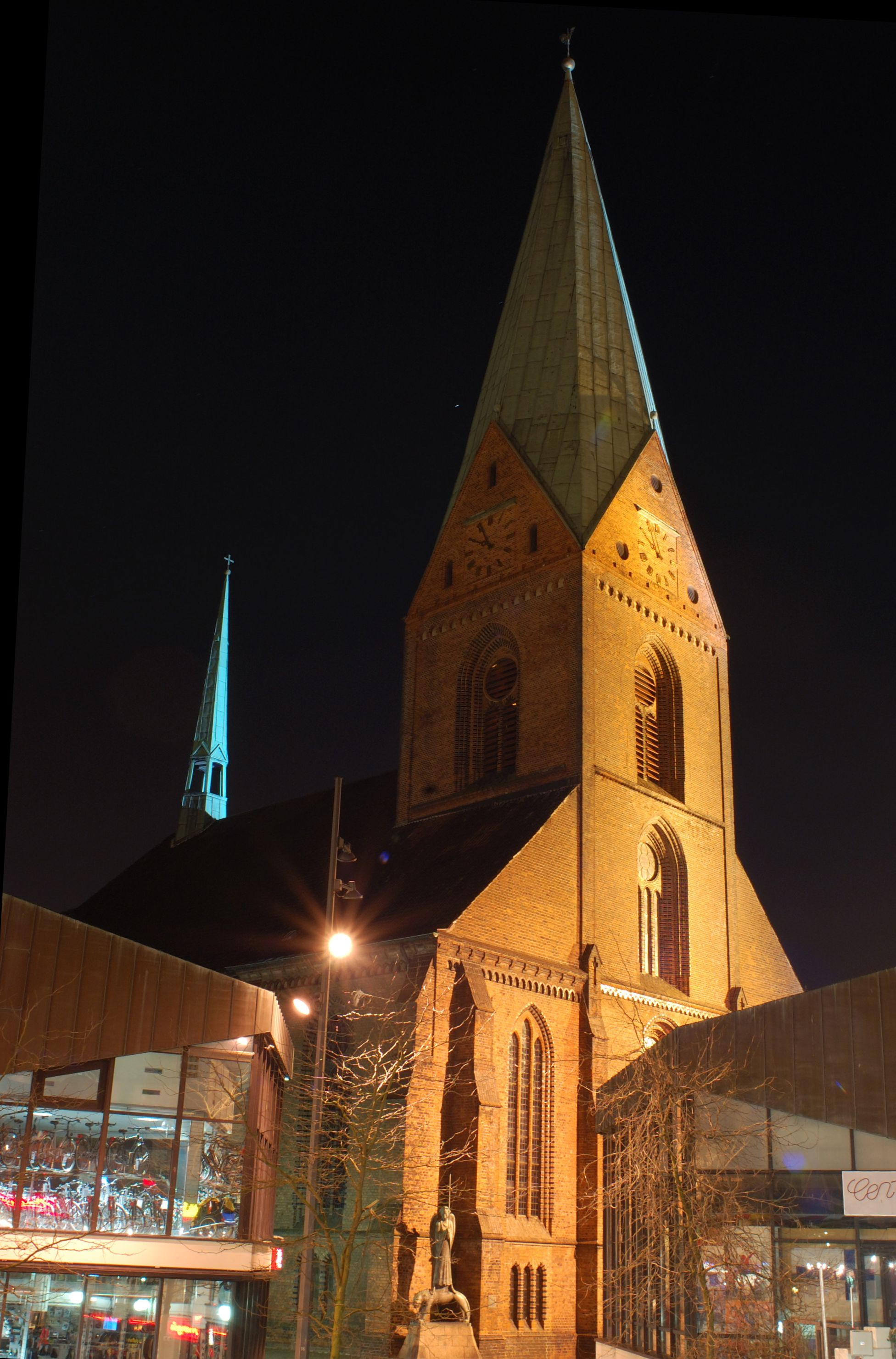
2008

== Interior ==
The bronze baptismal font (Taufe) by Hans Apengeter dates back to 1344 and is the oldest artwork in the church. It is regarded as one of the best medieval bronzes in northern Germany. He created it after the Wismar Taufe of 1331 and the Lübeck Taufe of 1337. The Erzväteraltar (Altar of the patriarchs) from 1460 was made for the church of the Liel Abbey, and was moved to St. Nikolai in 1541 when the monastery was dissolved in the Reformation. The large Triumphkreuz (Triumphal cross) dates back to 1490. The Baroque pulpit is a woodcarving by Theodor Allers from 1705. It was a donation by Henning von Wedderkop to replace a 1522 pulpit. The church holds the oldest Nagelkreuz von Coventry in Germany, from 1947.

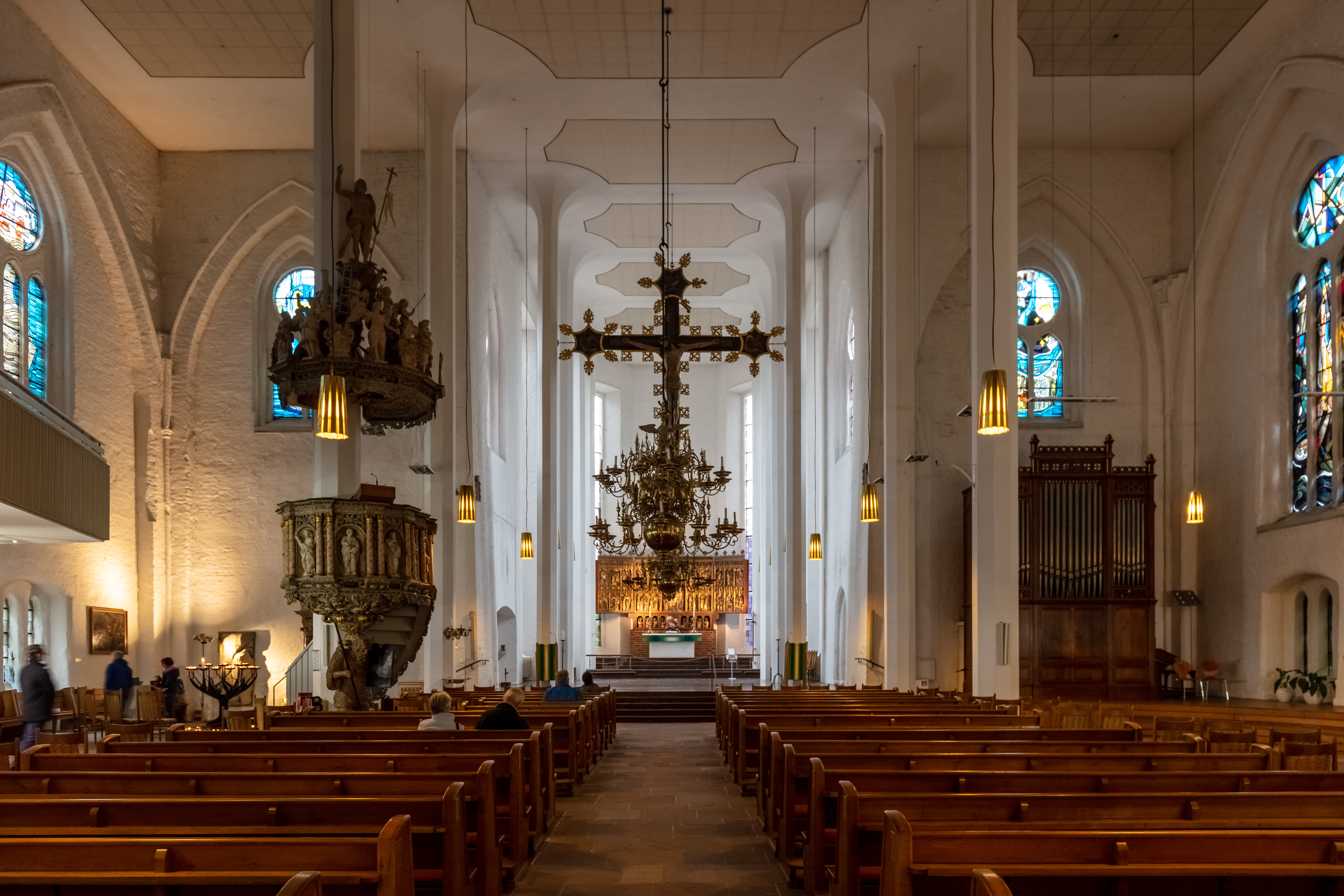
Interior facing the altar, with pupit, cross and choir organ

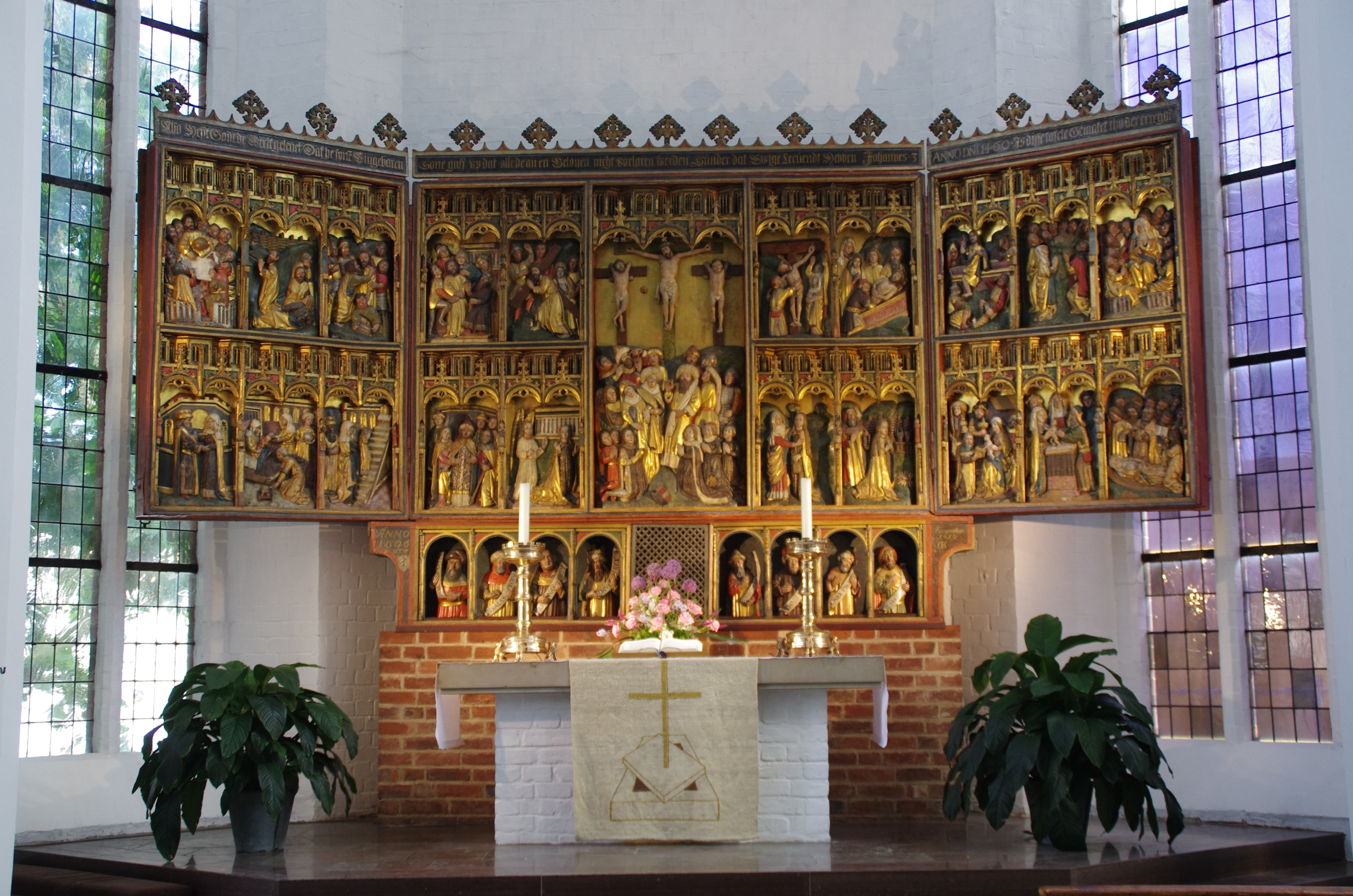
Erzväteraltar

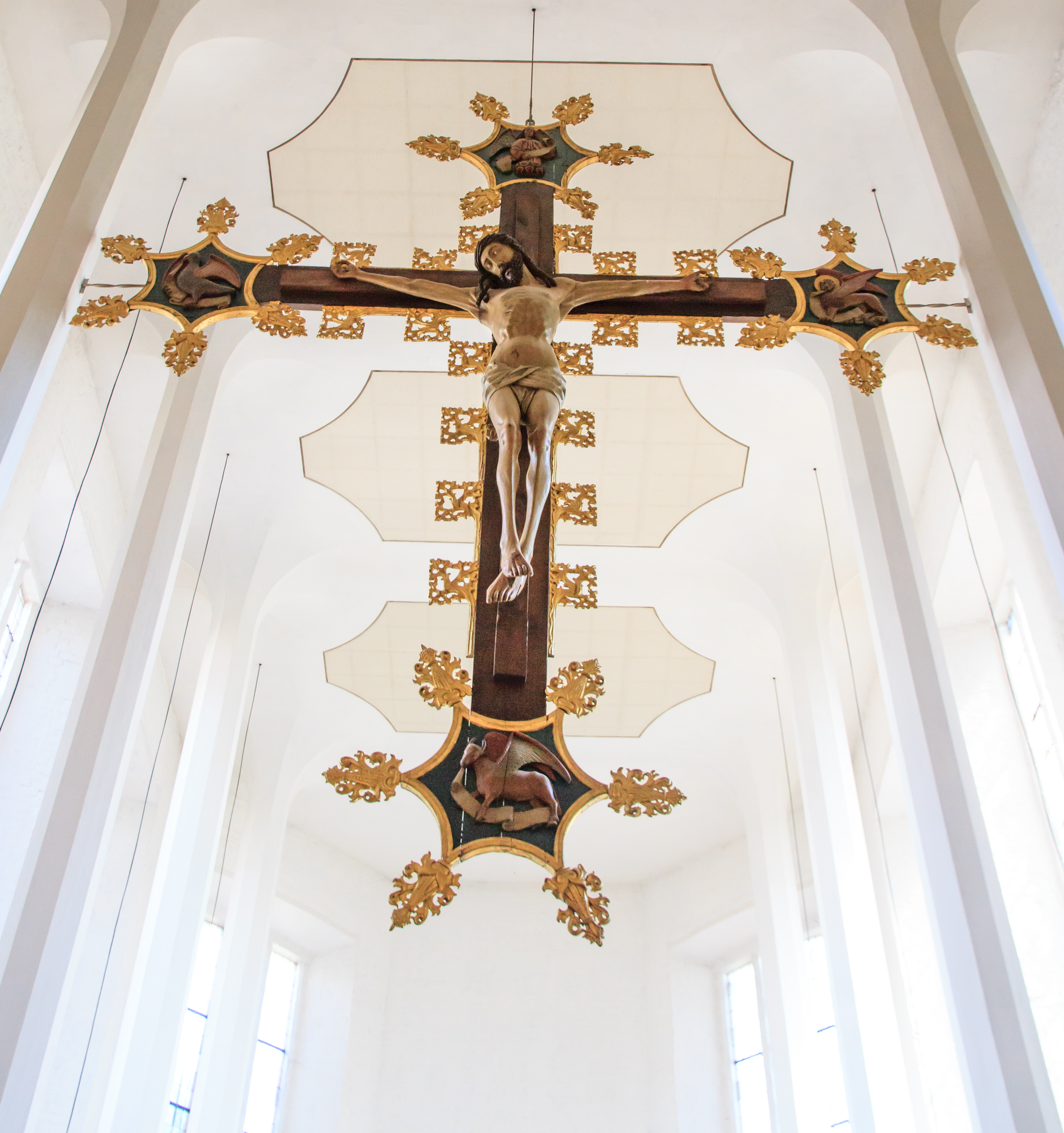
Triumphkreuz

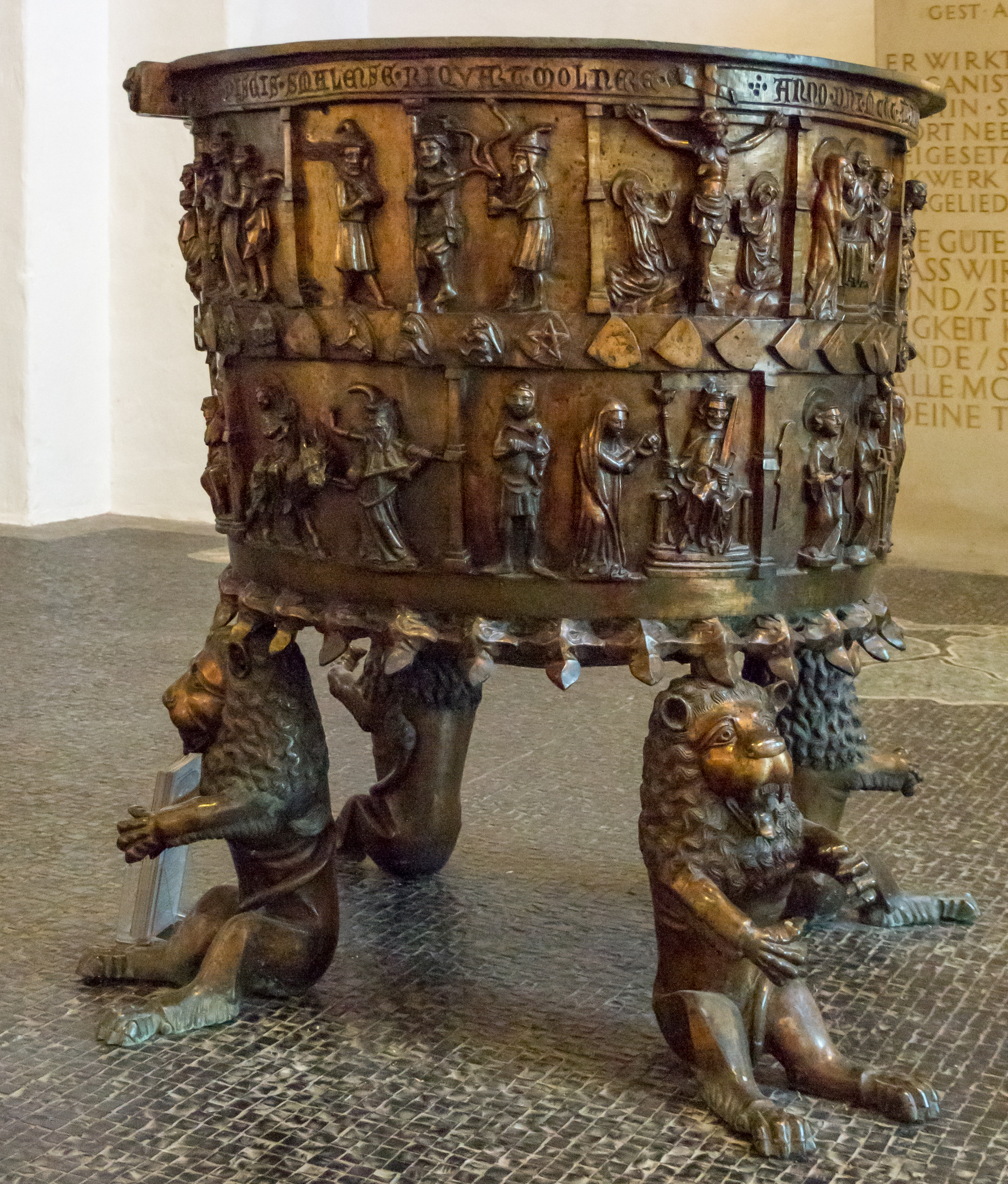
Baptismal font

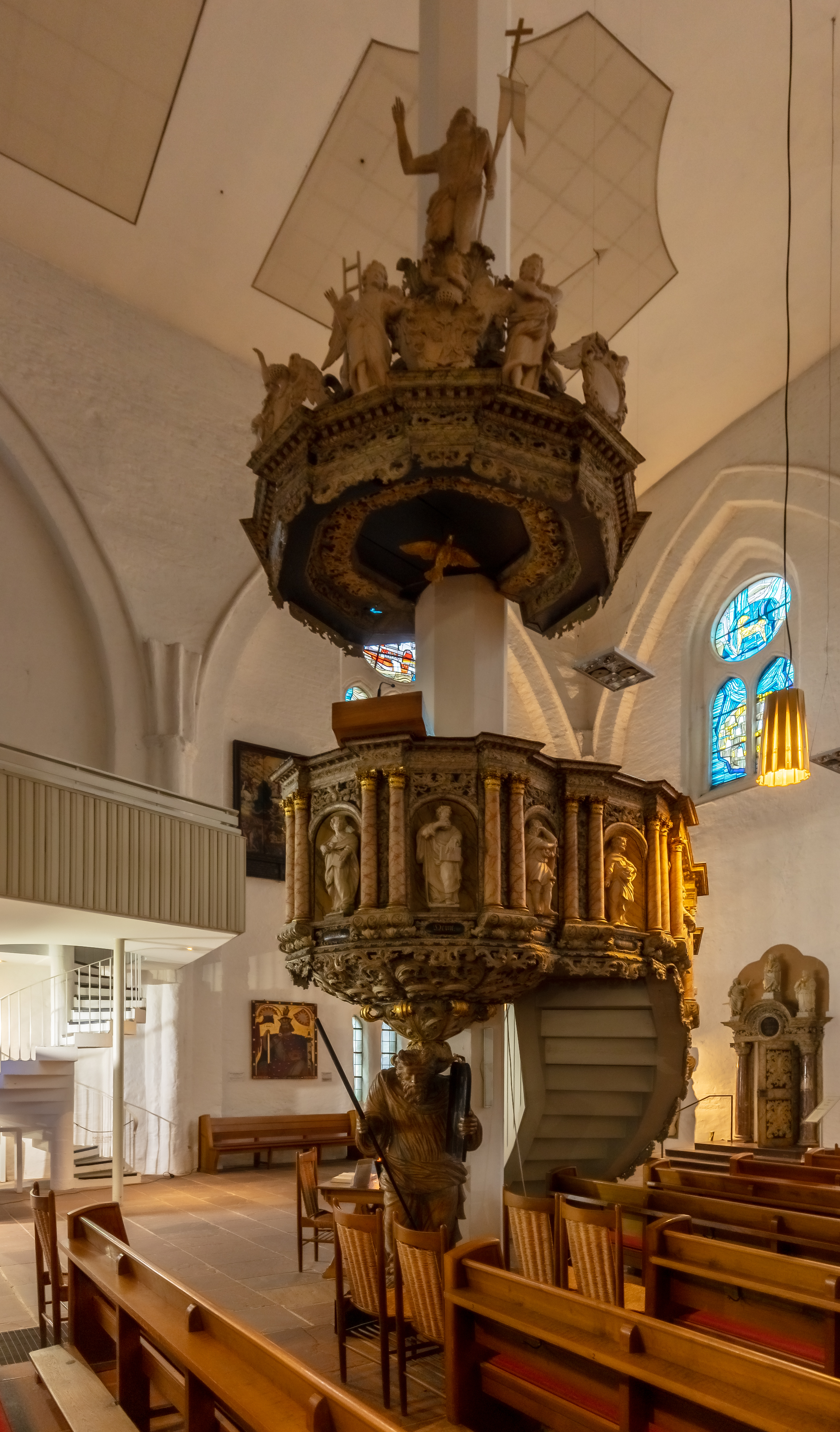
Detail of the pulpit

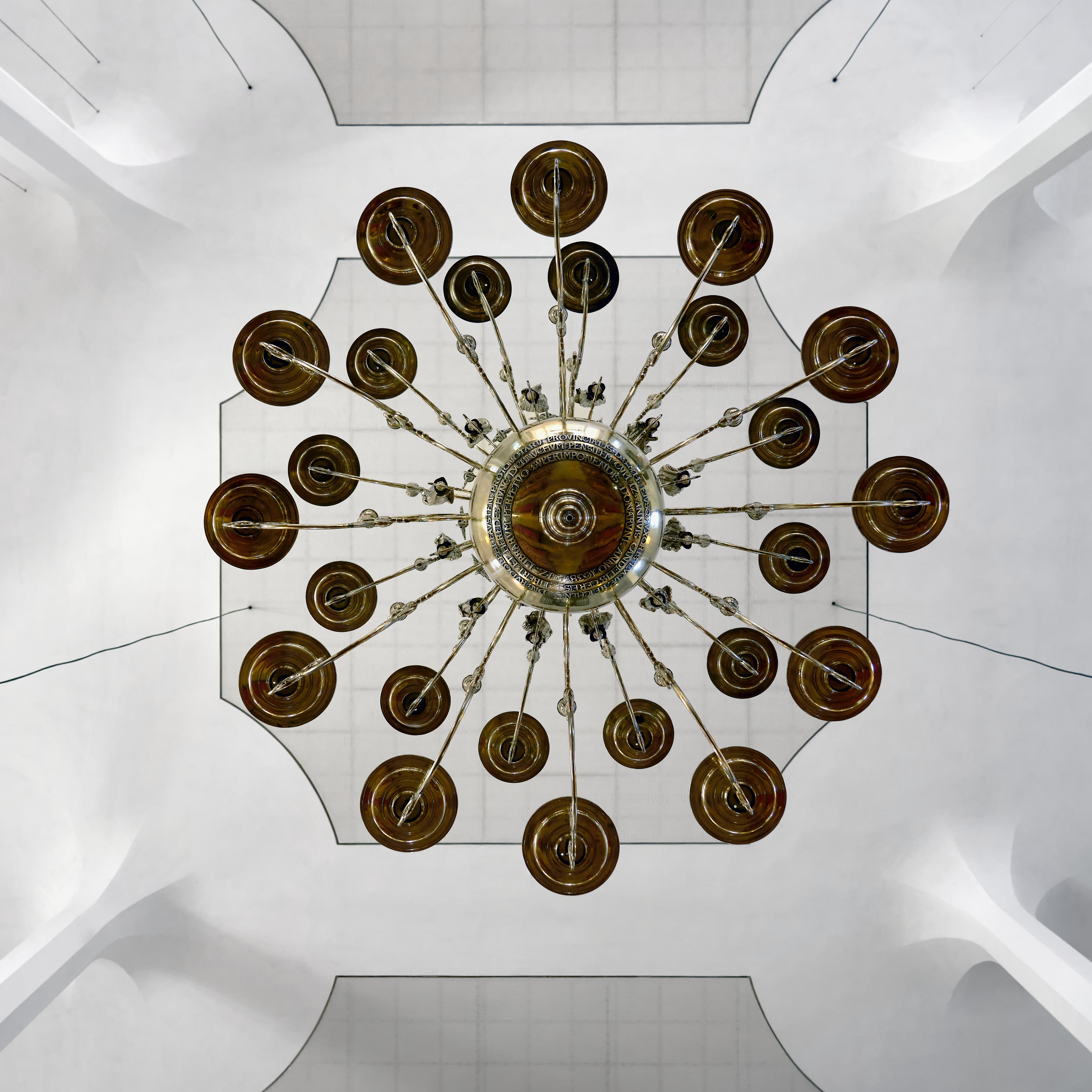
brass chandelier

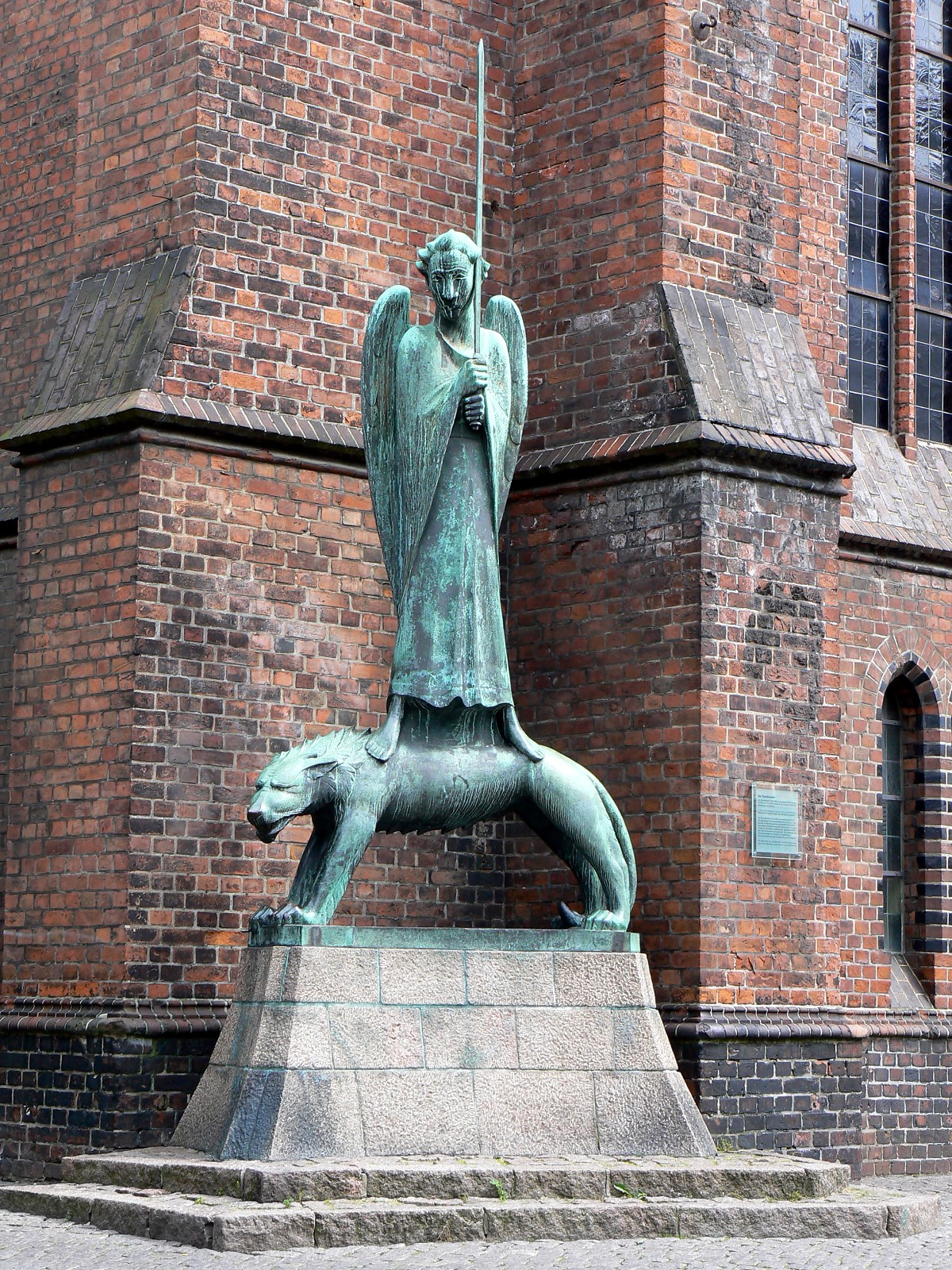
Geistkämpfer by Ernst Barlach

On a commission by the town of Kiel, Ernst Barlach created a large sculpture as his first work of the kind. An angel with a sword dominates a wolf-like creature, as a symbol for the superiority of spirit and its victory over evil. The bronze was first installed at the Heiligengeistkirche of the former monastery, without a public celebration, because people objected to its style. First untitled, the sculpture was called Geistkämpfer (The Fighter of the Spirit) by the population. In 1937, the Nazi government removed the sculpture as entartete Kunst. It was hidden in Schnega in the atelier of Hugo Körtzinger, a friend of Barlach. After the war, Kiel bought the Geistkämpfer back and installed it in St. Nikolai in 1954. Copies of the sculpture are in front of the Gethsemane Church in Berlin, and in front of the Minneapolis Institute of Arts in Minnesota.

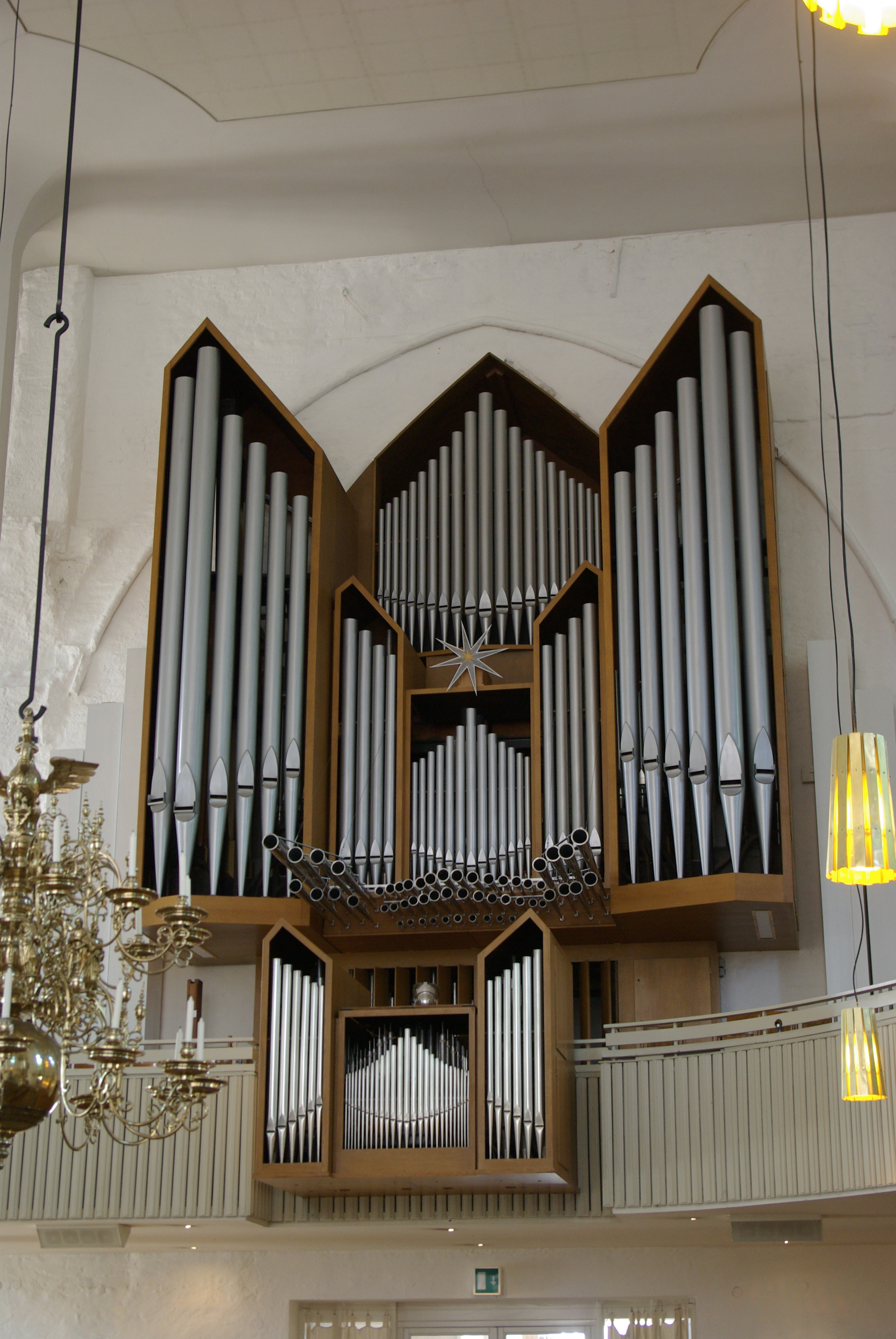
Main organ

The main organ was built in 1965 by Detlef Kleuker of Brackwede. It had three manuals and pedalboard, 45 stops and 3,288 pipes. It was extensively restored in 1998 by the Ulrich Babel of Gettorf, to overcome problems which had arisen from electrification and the use of synthetic materials for the windchest. It was repitched by Eppo Rynko Ottes of (Barcelona). In the choir there is a small positive organ by the Babel organ works.

== Literature ==
- Johannes Lorentzen: Die Glocken von St. Nikolai. [Ein Spiel der Glockenbegegnung], Kiel: Karl J. Rößler 1929
- Johannes Lorentzen: 700 Jahre St. Nikolaikirche in Kiel. Missionsbuchhandlung, Breklum 1941
- Johannes Habich: Nikolaikirche Kiel. Deutscher Kunstverlag, Munich / Berlin 1980
- Klaus Thiede: St. Nikolai in Kiel. Ein Beitrag zur Geschichte der Stadtkirche. Mühlau, Kiel 1960
