= Invasion of South Georgia =

April 1982 battle during the Falklands War

Coordinates: 54°17′6.86″S 36°29′56.62″W

Battle of Grytviken
- Part of the Falklands War
- Grytviken, 3 April 1982
Date	3 April 1982
Location	Grytviken, South Georgia
Result	Argentine victory: surrender of the Royal Marines garrison
Territorial changes	South Georgia occupied by Argentina

Belligerents
United Kingdom	Argentina

Commanders and leaders
Lt. Keith Mills (POW)	César Trombetta

Units involved
Royal Marines	Argentine Navy: Argentine Marines

Strength
22 marines; 1 survey ship	60 marines; 1 corvette; 1 survey ship; 2 helicopters

Casualties and losses
1 wounded; 22 captured	3 killed; 9 wounded; 1 corvette damaged; 1 helicopter shot down

The invasion of South Georgia, also known as the Battle of Grytviken or Operation Georgias, took place on 3 April 1982, when Argentine Navy forces seized control of the east coast of South Georgia after overpowering a small group of Royal Marines at Grytviken. Though outnumbered, the Royal Marines shot down a helicopter and hit the Argentine corvette ARA Guerrico several times before being forced to surrender. It was one of the first episodes of the Falklands War, immediately succeeding the invasion on the Falkland Islands the day before.

The operation had been prepared on 19 March, when a group of Argentine civilian scrap metal workers arrived at Leith Harbour on board the transport ship ARA Bahía Buen Suceso without the required landing clearance and then raised the Argentine flag. The scrap workers had been infiltrated by Argentine marines posing as civilian scientists.

== Prelude ==
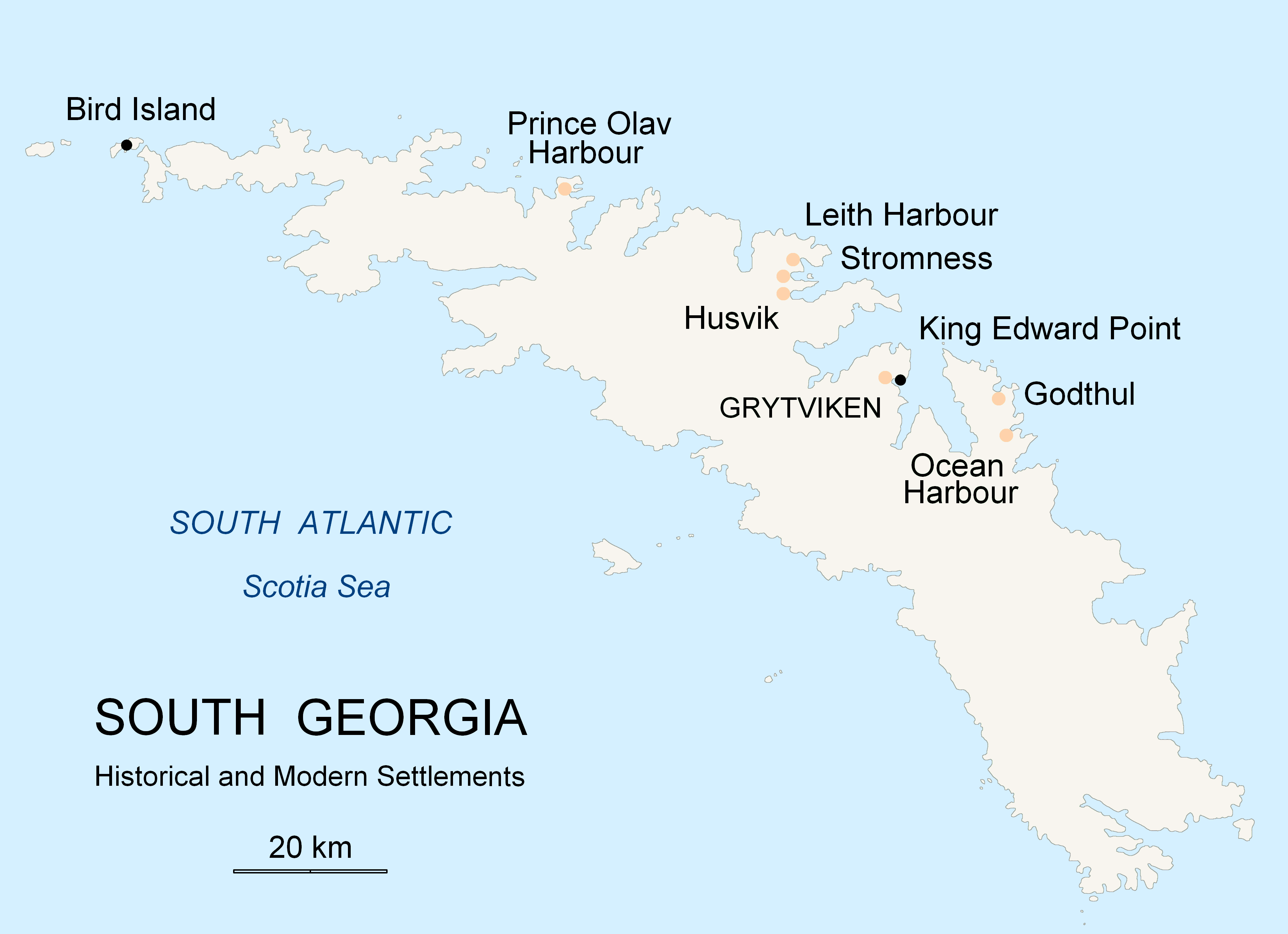
South Georgia

The only British presence at Leith on 19 March was a British Antarctic Survey (BAS) team, whose leader Trefor Edwards handed a message from London to the commander of Buen Suceso, captain Briatore, demanding the removal of the Argentine flag and the departure of the party. At the same time, the Argentine crew had to report to the top BAS commander in Grytviken, Steve Martin. Briatore replied that the mission had the approval of the British embassy in Buenos Aires.

Eventually, the Argentine captain ordered the lowering of the flag, but failed to report to Grytviken. The BAS commander sent a message to the Governor of the Falkland Islands, Rex Hunt (South Georgia being run as a dependency of the Falklands). After consulting London, Hunt was instructed to dispatch HMS Endurance to South Georgia with a detachment of 22 Royal Marines.

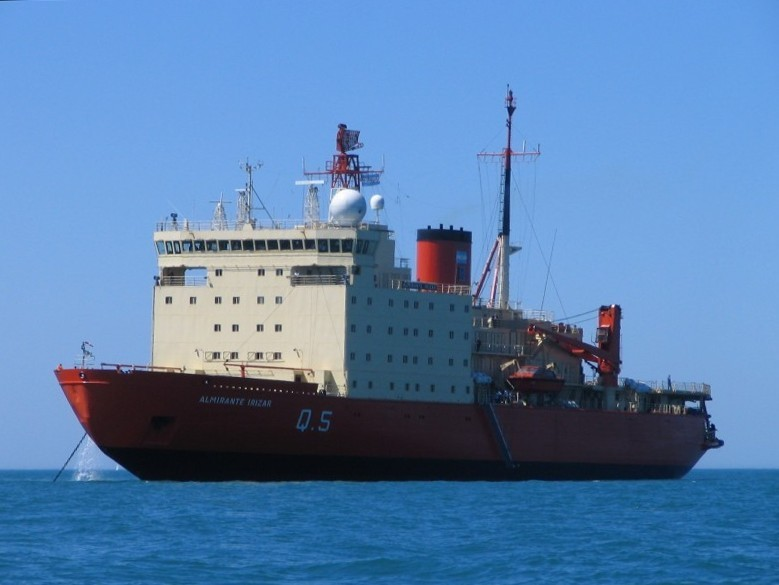
ARA Almirante Irízar, first Argentine Navy ship to arrive at Grytviken in December 1981

The reason for the landing of scrap metal workmen at Leith was a 1978 contract between a company owned by Argentine businessman Constantino Davidoff and British company Christian Salvesen for the removal of an abandoned whaling station on the island. Aware of the contract, the Argentine Navy conceived of a plan to hijack Davidoff's business in South Georgia in order to establish an undercover base on the disputed territory. The action was code named Operation Alpha.

There had been already two other Argentine trips to South Georgia: in December 1981, on board the Argentine icebreaker ARA Almirante Irízar, when Davidoff made an inventory of the facilities; and in February 1982, when an alleged commercial rival of Davidoff, bank employee Adrian Marchessi, made an unannounced visit to Leith. Marchessi assessed Leith facilities on board the Panamanian registered yacht Caiman, which had sailed out of Mar del Plata. He later reported himself to Grytviken, claiming that he was part of Davidoff's scheme and giving the British authorities details of the December inspection and even of early Argentine trips during the 1970s.

The failure of the Argentines to comply with the diplomatic formalities prompted Britain to opt for a small-scale intervention. In the meantime, a formal protest was issued by the British embassy in Buenos Aires. The Argentine Foreign Minister's response appeared to defuse the crisis; the note asserted that the Buen Suceso would soon be leaving, and that the mission had no official sanction at all. By the morning of 22 March, Buen Suceso left Leith harbour. However, in the afternoon, a BAS observation post detected the presence of Argentine personnel and passed the information to London. In consequence, the Foreign Office chose to order HMS Endurance to evacuate any Argentine personnel remaining in South Georgia.

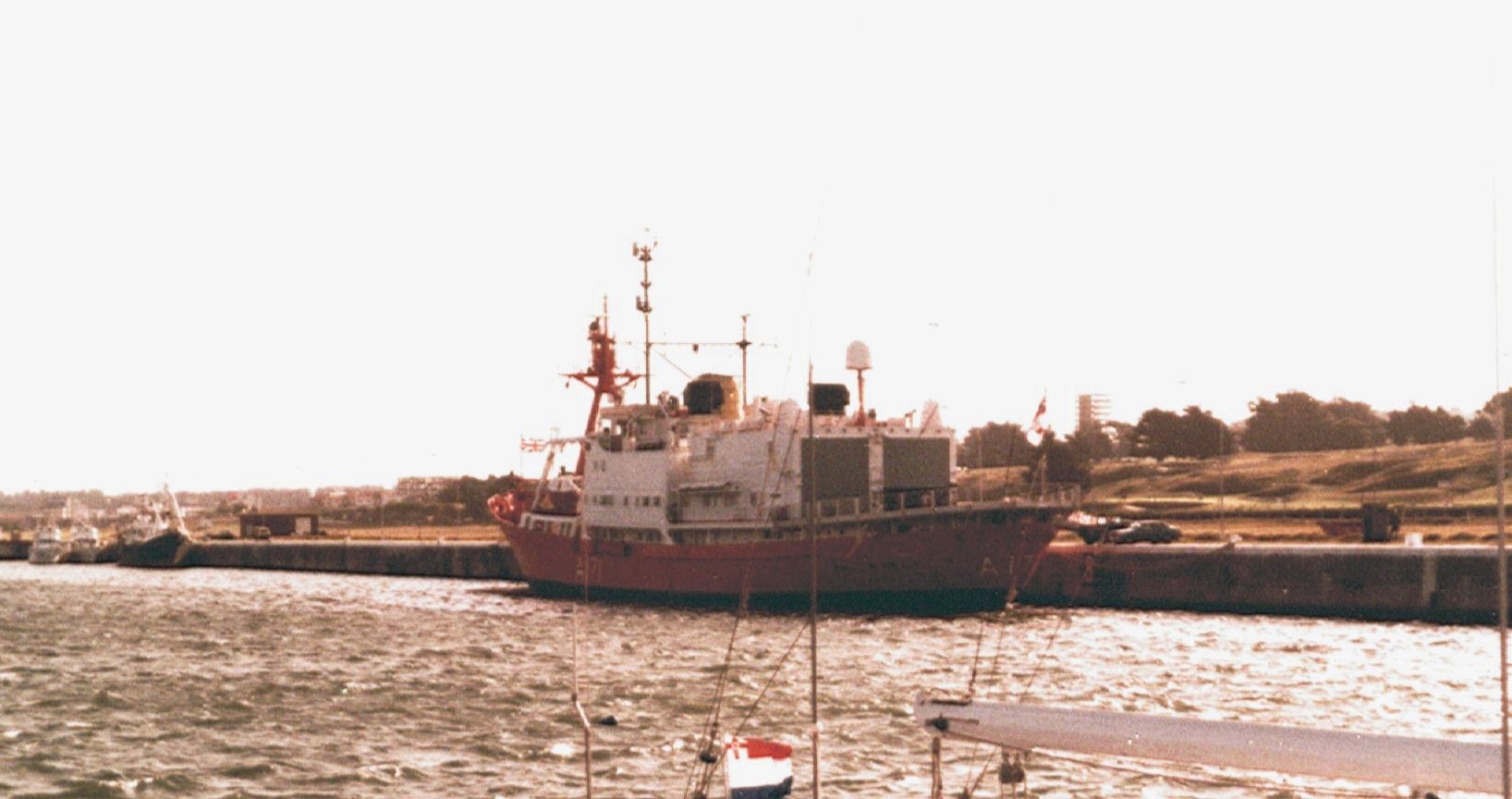
HMS Endurance at Mar del Plata naval base, during her trip to the Falklands in February 1982

The British moves met with a series of Argentine countermeasures: the corvettes ARA Drummond and ARA Granville were deployed between the Falklands and South Georgia, which would have allowed them to intercept Endurance and remove any Argentine personnel on board. In addition, upon arrival at Leith, Endurance found the Antarctic Survey ship ARA Bahía Paraíso at anchor. This vessel landed a party of 10 naval commandos picked up from South Orkney Islands.

Facing the potential for military action, the Foreign Office sought some sort of compromise. Lord Carrington proposed to his counterpart, Nicanor Costa Méndez, to indulge the workers' presence at Leith, given the proper documentation, which could include the stamping of temporary permissions instead of passports, a concession crucial to the Argentine position. The Argentine intention, however, was that the arrival of any of its citizens to South Georgia should follow the procedures agreed on in the communications treaty of 1971. Governor Rex Hunt strongly rejected this extension of the agreement, valid only for the Falklands jurisdiction, and raised his concerns to the British government. Costa Mendez left things in limbo; the countries were then on the brink of conflict.

== Battle ==
=== 2 April ===
Shortly before the Argentine landings on the Falklands, Bahía Paraíso and Endurance were playing a cat-and-mouse game around South Georgia, until 31 March, when the ships lost track of each other. The British plan was that Martin would be in charge until the Argentine forces showed any hostile intentions. If that occurred, Acting Lieutenant Keith Mills, the most senior officer of the Royal Marines party, would take command. Mills received a radio message from HMS Endurance relaying instructions from London that he should make only a token resistance to any Argentine violation of British territory. It was reported that he replied "sod that, I'll make their eyes water", although Mills later stated the story was not true. On 2 April, Captain Alfredo Astiz (a leading figure during the Dirty War, whose extradition was requested by France for human rights violations) announced to the Argentine party in Leith that Argentina had taken over the Falklands.

Meanwhile, the Argentine navy ordered the corvette ARA Guerrico to join Bahía Paraíso at Leith, equipped with two helicopters and carrying 40 marines, along with Astiz's team. The aim was the capture of Grytviken. The group would be called Grupo de Tareas 60.1, under the command of Captain Trombetta, on board Bahía Paraíso.

After learning of the fall of Stanley, Mills took urgent measures: his men fortified the beach at King Edward Point, near the entrance of the bay with wire and landmines, and prepared defences around the BAS buildings. Endurance, some miles offshore, would provide communication between the small British detachment and London. The new rules of engagement authorized Mills to "fire in self defence, after warning". A later statement from the British government instructed the marines to "not resist beyond the point where lives might be lost to no avail."

On the other side, the Argentine plans for 2 April in South Georgia were thwarted by poor weather. These plans consisted in the landing of Astiz's special forces on Hope Point, near Grytviken, to secure the arrival of the bulk of the land forces, carried by helicopter. Guerrico would provide naval fire support outside the bay. But the arrival of the corvette was delayed by a storm, so a new course of action was decided for the next day.

According to the new plan, the first landing would be led by an Alouette helicopter, followed by three waves of marines on a Puma from Bahia Paraiso. After sending a radio message demanding that the British surrender, Trombetta would order Guerrico to make a thrust into Grytviken harbor, right in front of King Edward Point. The Argentine rules of engagement authorized the corvette to fire her weapons only at request of the landing parties. Astiz's men would remain in the rearguard on board Bahia Paraiso. All the forces involved should avoid enemy casualties as long as possible. Official British historian Lawrence Freedman believes that Trombetta made these provisions thinking he was dealing only with the BAS team.

=== 3 April ===
At 10:30 GMT, as the weather improved, Bahia Paraiso demanded the surrender of Grytviken. The message intimated that Rex Hunt had surrendered not only the Falklands, but also its dependencies, which was untrue. Lt Mills copied and forwarded the message to HMS Endurance, with the intention of buying time. At the same time, he invited the BAS personnel to take cover inside the local church. By then, the Alouette was overflying Grytviken and Guerrico was making her first entrance into the cove.

According to Mayorga, Captain Carlos Alfonso, commander of Guerrico, hesitated whether or not to expose the corvette in such narrow waters. Mayorga also supports Freedman's speculation about Trombetta's wrong assumptions regarding British military presence around the harbour, citing an official report. Trombetta also had some reservations about the combat readiness of the warship since she had been in dry dock just days before departing from her home base at Puerto Belgrano.

==== Helicopter shot down ====
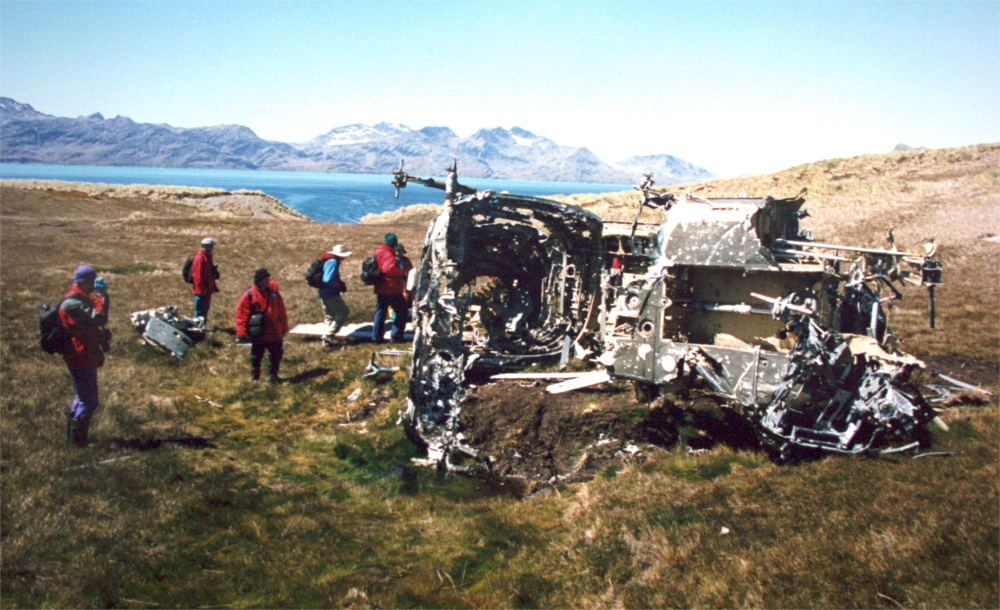
Remains of an Argentine Puma

The Puma landed a first group of 15 Argentine marines on King Edward point at 11:41, on the opposite side from Shackleton House, where the Royal Marines were entrenched. By then, Guerrico knew that the general area of deployment of the Royal Marines was on the northern shore of the cove's mouth.

The second wave of marines took off from Bahia Paraiso deck on board the Puma at 11:47. The commander of the Argentine group already inland, Lieutenant Luna, requested via Guerrico—he had no direct communication with Bahia Paraiso—that the second wave should be equipped with 60 mm mortars, but the party was already in flight. The landing was to take place to the east of Luna's position, well within the view of the British detachment.

The helicopter was spotted by Mills and his men and met by intense automatic fire. The pilot was able to cross the bay and crash-land on its southern bank. Two men were killed and four wounded. At the same time, Luna's troops started their march towards Shackleton House, but the marines pinned them down with heavy gunfire. Therefore, Luna asked Guerrico for fire support.

==== ARA Guerrico ====
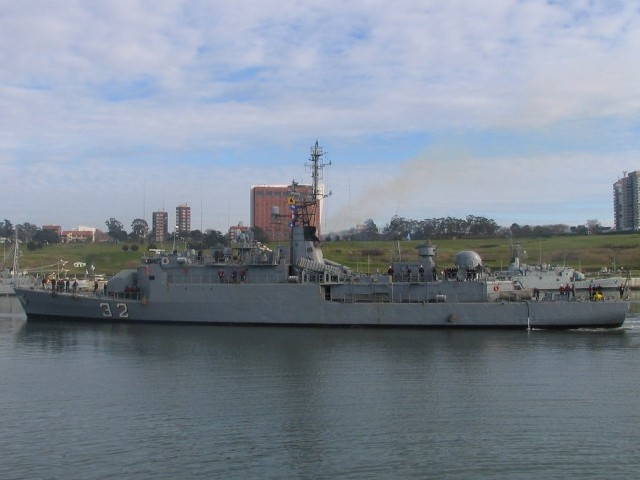
ARA Guerrico in 2005

The corvette then carried out her second thrust into the cove, and at 11:55 opened fire. To her commander's disappointment, the 20 mm guns jammed after the first shot, and the 40 mm mounting after firing just six rounds. The 100 mm gun became useless after the first shot. Completely exposed, the warship had no other choice but to go ahead in order to put about. At 11:59, the corvette was hit by small arms fire and at least one anti-tank rocket.

According to Mills, his party opened fire from a distance of 550 metres (1,800 ft). The shooting killed one seaman and injured five others, damaging electrical cables, the 40 mm gun, one Exocet launcher and the 100 mm mounting. All Argentine sources acknowledge that more than 200 small arms rounds hit the corvette. In the meantime, Lieutenant Busson's Alouette had been ferrying more Argentine Marines ashore, out of range of the British weapons.

While the battered Guerrico steered out of the bay, the Argentine troops resumed the exchange of fire with Mills' marines. Corporal Nige Peters was hit twice in the arm. Once she was out of range, Guerrico reopened fire with her 100 mm main gun, now back in service. This convinced Mills that things were over, and he ordered his marines to cease fire. This happened at 12:48 according to Mayorga. Mills approached the Argentine positions waving a white coat, and surrendered, "after achieving his aim of compelling the Argentine troops to use military force." Mills and his men were taken in custody by Astiz's group, who had been left in reserve during the battle. Endurance dispatched one of her helicopters to Cumberland Bay. The aircraft landed there, and spotted an Argentine corvette and a transport ship inside the cove, but found no signs of fighting. Endurance remained in South Georgia waters until 5 April.

== Aftermath ==
The corvette Guerrico, which had lost 50% of her firepower due to combat damage, left Grytviken along with Bahia Paraiso at 03:15 of 4 April, bound for Rio Grande. She spent three days in dry dock for repairs. The marines were disarmed and taken on board Bahia Paraiso, ferried to Rio Grande and then airlifted to Montevideo.

Marine Andrew Michael Lee later said he and the other British prisoners were treated well and there was a feeling of respect between the two sides: "They bore us no malice. They did understand the job we did. They were Marines, like ourselves." They eventually returned to the United Kingdom on 20 April. Some British BAS members working in remote areas continued their activities undeterred until the British reconquest. Wildlife film maker Cindy Buxton and her assistant were evacuated by a helicopter from HMS Endurance on 30 April. She would later reveal that Royal Navy personnel had given her and fellow journalist Annie Price a pistol and that both women had been trained how to use it. The Argentine Navy left a detachment of 55 marines on the island. The 39 scrap metal workers also remained in Leith. South Georgia was retaken by British forces on 25 April 1982, during Operation Paraquet.

In 2013, Michael Poole, seeking reconciliation for his role in shooting down the Puma helicopter, contacted Víctor Ibáñez, president of the Asociación Veteranos Defensores de Malvinas (Veterans' Association of Malvinas Defenders, known as Avedema). Ibáñez, a former marine corporal that fought against Lieutenant Mills's platoon, welcomed Poole with open arms, and he explained, "We're both soldiers, men of honour and knew how to accept the role each one played."

=== Decorations and honours ===
- Lieutenant Mills and Lieutenant Commander John Anthony Ellerbeck (who commanded Endurance's helicopters) were awarded the Distinguished Service Cross.
- Sergeant Peter James Leach, RM, was awarded the Distinguished Service Medal.
- Captain Nick Barker, HMS Endurance's captain, was appointed Commander of the Order of the British Empire.
- Principal Corporal (Gunnery) Francisco Solano Páez was awarded Argentine's Medal of Valour in Combat.

== In popular culture ==
The television series The Crown depicts the landing in March of the scrap metal workers on Port Leith and the raising of the Argentine flag.

The story of the invasion is told in novel form in "Cry Argentina" by Ian Sykes, a former dog sledge driver with The British Antarctic Survey.

== See also ==
- 1982 invasion of the Falkland Islands
- Events leading to the Falklands War
