= Francis Drummond =

Argentine naval personnel, 1798 - 1827

- Native name: Francisco Drummond
- Born: 20 September 1798; Dundee, Scotland
- Died: 8 April 1827 (aged 28) Battle of Monte Santiago, Río de la Plata
- Allegiance: Argentina
- Branch: Argentine Navy
- Rank: Sergeant Major
- Conflicts: Cisplatine War
- Awards: Silver Shield medal
- Spouse: Engaged to Elisa Brown

Francis Drummond (also known in Spanish as Francisco Drummond) (1798 – 1827) was an Argentine naval sailor who died in the naval Battle of Monte Santiago against the Brazilian Imperial Navy on 8 April 1827.

This battle was fought on 7–8 April 1827, during the Cisplatine War, between Argentina and Brazil. It was one of the most courageous and ferocious naval encounters in Argentine history.

Sergeant Major Drummond was on the 22-gun brigantine Independencia. He died on deck, firing his marooned ship's cannons instead of retreating.

== Personal details ==
In Dundee the Old Parish Registers state that Francis Drummond was born on 20 September 1798 to Francis Drummond, Shipmaster and Catherine (née Young), daughter of John Young; he was baptized on 27 September 1798. On September 7, 1822, the Prince Regent of Brazil proclaimed independence from Portugal (known as Grito de Ipiranga). In London the recruitment of officers for the navy of the nascent state began and one of those summoned was Lord Cochrane. Drummond joined him as a naval officer. He participated in the capture of Marañón, the siege of Bahia and finally the victory over the Portuguese forces at Itapuã. After the war, with the rank of first lieutenant, he accompanied Lord Cochrane when he returned to England in 1825.

When a new war was declared between the Empire of Brazil and the Argentine Republic, Drummond requested the withdrawal of the Imperial Brazilian Navy on February 8, 1826, and a month later he embarked for the Río de la Plata in the North American schooner with Captain Deverians, arriving in Montevideo on March 21. There he was arrested at the request of the two British naval officers in the service of the Imperial Navy, John Pascoe Grenfell and James Norton, but was released by the intervention of the British consul. At the end of 1826 Drummond was finally able to join the Argentine squadron operating on the Uruguay River and on January 24, 1827 he was appointed captain, receiving command of the Maldonado Goleta, formerly the Leal Paulistana that had been captured from the Brazilians on 21 September on Gorriti Island.

At the Battle of Juncal (February 8 and 9, 1827), Drummond fought against the schooner Bertioga, commanded by Lieutenant John Broon. The Bertioga was a twin of his ship. He was finally able to capture her. For his bravery in battle, he was awarded the Silver Shield medal and promoted to Sergeant Major on March 23, 1827. At the time of his death he was engaged to Admiral Brown's daughter, Elisa.

Drummond is buried in the Protestant Cemetery at Buenos Aires and registered as "Drummond, Captain Francis, Aberdeen or Dundee, Scotland 9/4/1827, Single, Killed in battle, Seaman."

== Memorials ==
The Argentine Navy named a corvette class after him. ARA Drummond, launched in 1977, is the lead ship of the Drummond class of three corvettes of the Argentine Navy. She is the second vessel to be named after him.
