= Keith Mills (Royal Marines officer) =

British Royal Marines officer

Keith Paul Mills
- Born: June 1959 (age 67)
- Military career
- Allegiance: United Kingdom
- Branch: Royal Marines
- Service years: before 1982 - 1996
- Rank: Captain
- Commands: Royal Marines detachment, South Georgia
- Conflicts: Falklands War: Battle of Grytviken
- Awards: Distinguished Service Cross
- Other work: Care home management

Keith Paul Mills (born June 1959) is a retired British Royal Marines officer who commanded the defence of South Georgia against the 1982 Argentine invasion.

== Military service ==
=== Falklands War ===
Early on 3 April 1982, Mills received a radio message from HMS Endurance relaying instructions from London that he should make only a token resistance to any Argentine violation of British territory. He allegedly replied "sod that, I'll make their eyes water", a remark that became famous. Mills confirmed in subsequent interviews, that he in fact had never said this.

During the two-hour Battle of Grytviken on 3 April 1982, Lieutenant Mills' detachment of 22 Royal Marines inflicted damage on the Argentine corvette ARA Guerrico, hitting her with an 84mm anti-tank round and many rounds of small arms fire, and shot down a Puma helicopter, killing two Argentine Marines and one sailor, while sustaining one wounded on the British side. The total Argentine losses were 3 killed and nine wounded. The losses suffered at Grytviken prevented Argentina from occupying the rest of the island, with 15 Britons remaining outside Argentine control on several locations from Bird Island and Schlieper Bay in the northwest to St. Andrews Bay to the southeast.

=== Later career ===
Lieutenant Mills and his Marines were treated as heroes in Britain, and he was awarded a Distinguished Service Cross for the defence of South Georgia. He was promoted from acting to substantive lieutenant on 1 September 1982. Mills remained in the Royal Marines after the war, being promoted to captain in 1989 and retiring in 1996.

== Retirement ==
Since retirement Mills has run care homes in the South West of England. In 2012 he was involved in a car crash that killed Richard Sawbridge, a local rugby coach. After a trial at Exeter Crown Court, Mills was cleared of causing death by dangerous driving.

His contribution as British commander at the Battle of Grytviken is commemorated in Mills Peak which is named in his honour.
