= Mills Peak (South Georgia) =

Mountain in South Georgia

Coordinates: 54°16′S 36°21′W

Mills Peak is a peak 1 nautical mile (2 km) southwest of Cape Douglas, rising to 625 metres (2,050 ft) in the northern portion of Barff Peninsula, South Georgia.

It was named by the UK Antarctic Place-Names Committee in 1988 for Lieutenant Keith Mills, commander of the Royal Marines platoon at King Edward Point at the Battle of Grytviken between the United Kingdom and Argentina, April 3, 1982.
