= Bristol Odin =

1960s British Ramjet missile engine

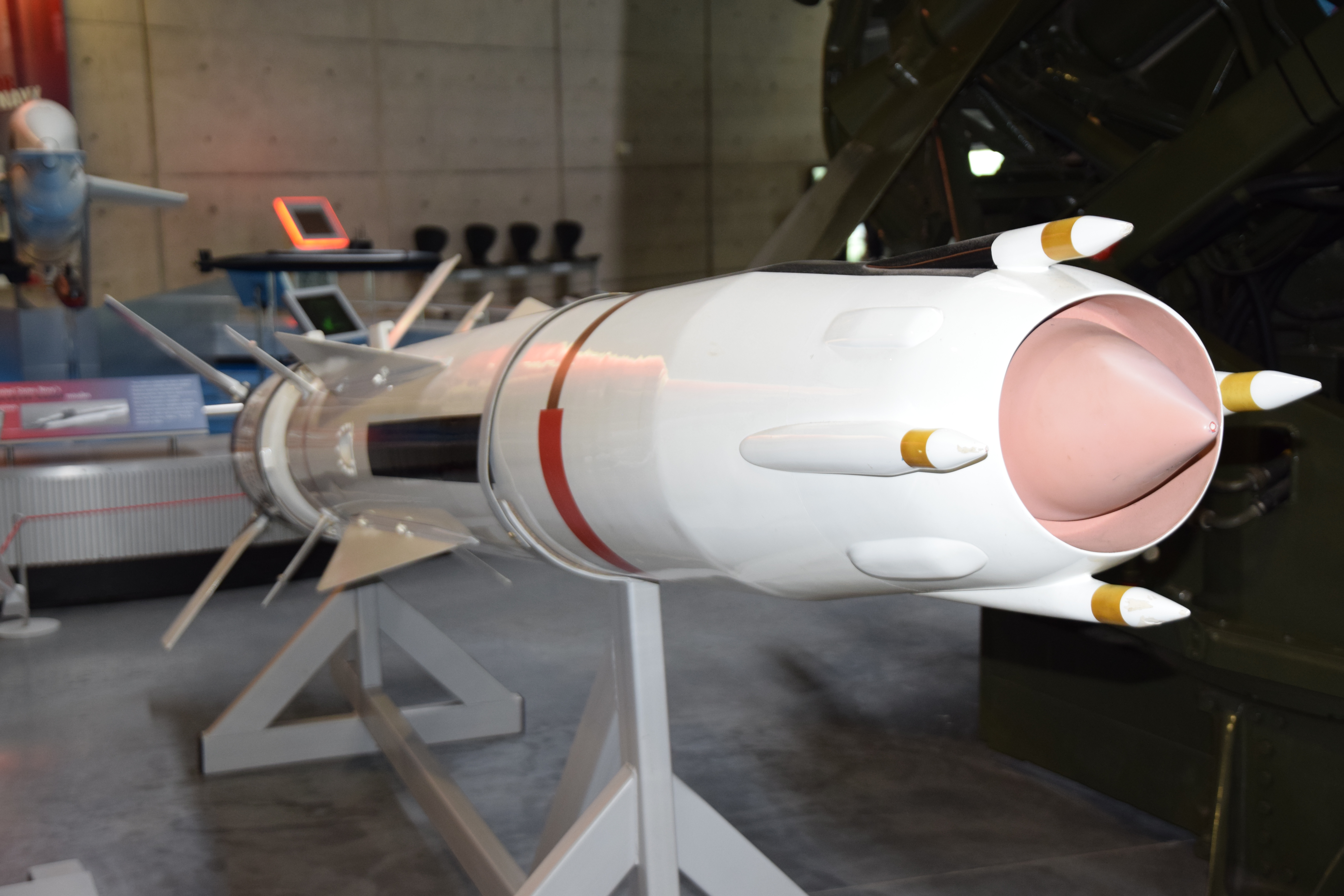
Sea Dart air intake cone illustrating the integral Odin ramjet

The Bristol Odin is a ramjet engine originally developed by Bristol Siddeley Engines, later taken over by Rolls-Royce.

Odin was specifically designed to power the Sea Dart missile. Unlike the earlier Thor ramjet powering the Bristol Bloodhound missile, Odin is an integral part of the Sea Dart airframe. A biconic intake at the front of the missile transfers air, via a transfer duct, to the ramjet combustor, which is located towards the rear of the missile. Thrust is provided via a fixed area ratio convergent-divergent nozzle. The only significant moving part in the engine is the fuel turbopump. This is powered by extracting 'ram' air in the transfer duct to drive an air-turbine, which is connected to the fuel pump. The air exiting the turbine is dumped overboard.
