= Sea Dart =

British surface-to-air missile system

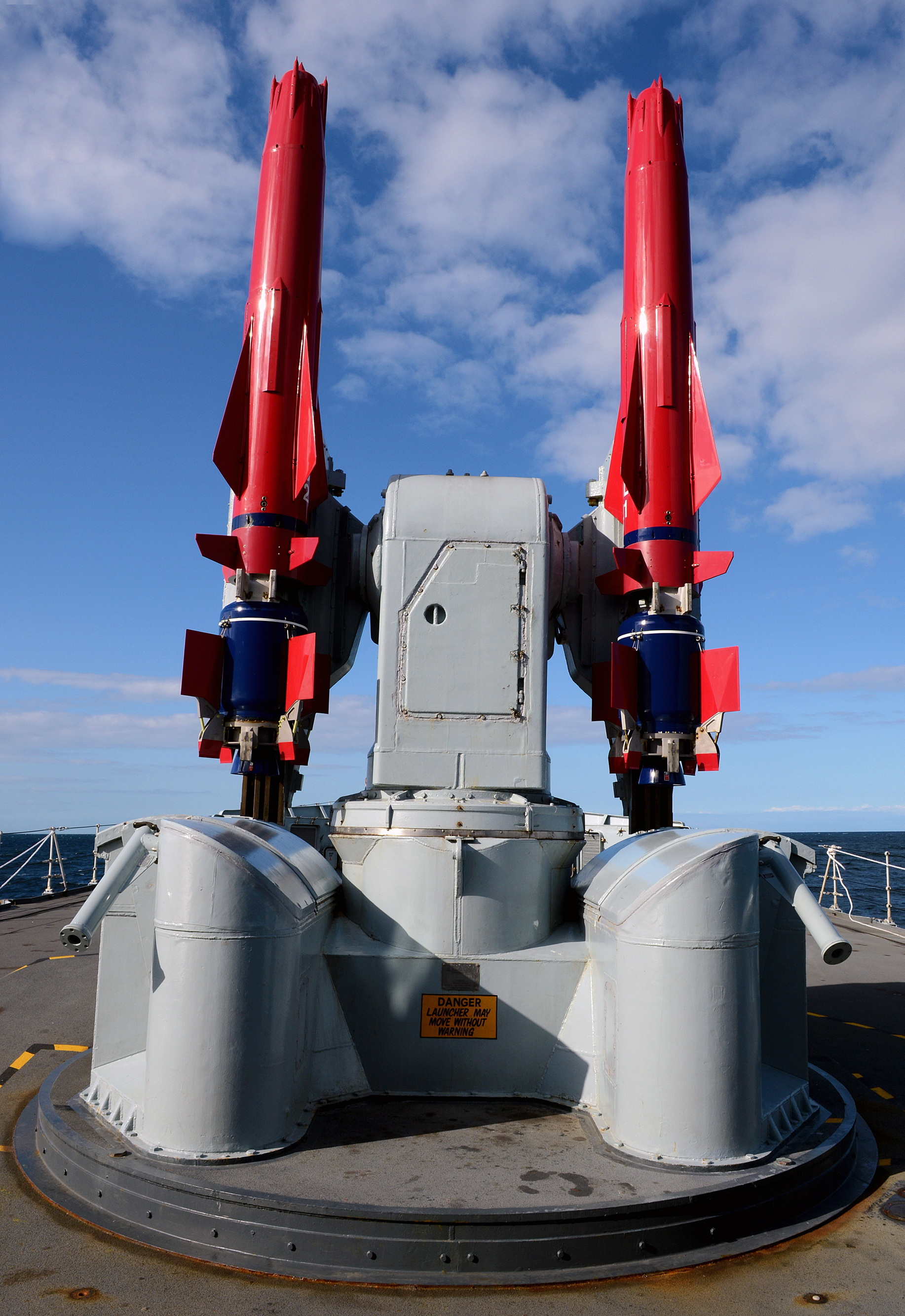
- Sea Dart drill missiles on HMS Edinburgh in 2012
- Type: Surface-to-air, surface-to-surface
- Place of origin: United Kingdom

Service history
- In service: 1973–2012
- Used by: See § Operators
- Wars: Falklands War; Gulf 1991

Production history
- Designer: Hawker Siddeley Dynamics
- Designed: 1963
- Manufacturer: Hawker Siddeley Dynamics (1963–1977); BAe Dynamics (1977–1999); MBDA UK (since 1999)
- Produced: 1970-2012
- No. built: 2,000+

Specifications
- Mass: 550 kg (1,210 lb)
- Length: 4.4 m (14 ft)
- Diameter: 0.42 m (17 in)
- Wingspan: 0.9 m (3.0 ft)
- Warhead: 11 kg (24 lb) HE blast-fragmentation
- Detonation mechanism: Proximity fuze and contact
- Engine: Chow solid-fuel booster motor Bristol Siddeley Odin ramjet cruise motor
- Operational range: Mod 0 (basic): 40 nmi (46 mi; 74 km); Mod 2 (upgrade): 80 nmi (92 mi; 150 km)
- Flight ceiling: 18,300 m (60,000 ft)
- Maximum speed: Mach 3.0+
- Guidance system: Semi-active radar illuminated by radar Type 909 (J-band)
- Steering system: Control surfaces
- Launch platform: Ship

Sea Dart, or GWS.30 (Note: GWS stands for Guided Weapon System. Seaslug was GWS.1.) was a Royal Navy surface-to-air missile system designed in the 1960s and entering service in 1973. It was fitted to the Type 42 destroyers, the sole Type 82 destroyer and the Invincible-class aircraft carriers. Originally developed by Hawker Siddeley, the missile was built by British Aerospace after 1977. It was replaced starting in 2009 with Sea Viper, with the last Sea Dart leaving service in 2012.

Britain's first naval surface-to-air missile was GWS1 Seaslug, which entered service in 1963. This used beam riding guidance which offered limited accuracy and was effective only against slower targets. The need for a higher performance system was identified even as Seaslug entered service. Bristol Aerospace proposed a new ramjet-powered design, while British Aircraft Corporation (BAC) offered a shorter-range rocket-powered design. The Admiralty requested a proposal combining BAC's layout with Bristol's engine, resulting in the Sea Dart. Compared to Seaslug, Sea Dart was faster, had greater range, and its semi-active radar homing guidance was more accurate and capable of engaging supersonic targets.

The system achieved nine confirmed successful combat engagements, including six aircraft, a helicopter, and an anti-ship missile. This included the first instance of a missile destroying another missile in combat. An additional helicopter was destroyed in a friendly fire incident during the Falklands War. Following the Falklands War, further upgrades extended its range to 80 miles (130 km).

The introduction of the new Type 45 destroyer beginning in 2009 led to Sea Dart being phased out of service as the aging Type 42's were decommissioned. The final operational launch took place on 13 April 2012, when HMS Edinburgh (D97) conducted the last Sea Dart firing during a major exercise off the coast of Scotland, bringing an end to the system’s 40-year service history.

== History ==
=== Impetus ===
From the immediate post-Second World War era, the Royal Navy sought a general-purpose weapon suitable for arming smaller ships. Experience with German glide bombs during the war showed the need for a medium-range surface-to-air missile capable of destroying bombers before they could reach a range for launching glide bombs. As such a system would occupy space normally used for a dual-purpose gun, it was also intended to have a secondary anti-ship capability, although this requirement was later reduced.

Extensive research and trials in the 1950s produced the Seaslug system. While effective against first-generation strike aircraft, its performance against faster aircraft and anti-ship missiles was limited, and its size made it unsuitable for frigate-sized ships. A high-performance gun concept, the DACR (direct-action, close-range), was considered, but calculations showed it would be ineffective against future manoeuvring anti-ship missiles.

=== SIGS ===
In October 1960, the Navy launched the Small Ship Integrated Guided Weapon System project to fill this need, SIGS for short. This called for a weapon small enough to be carried on a 3,000 ton frigate and able to attack bombers, anti-shipping missiles, and other ships up to frigate size. Seaslug had taken much longer to develop than expected and was a very costly, ongoing program. There was some concern that development of a new system should not commence before Seaslug was in service. A review by the Defence Research Policy Committee agreed with the Navy that the new design represented an entirely new class of weapon and that development should be undertaken immediately.

Two systems were initially considered for the role. Bristol's RP.25 was a ramjet powered design with a long ogive wing that was boosted to speed by two detachable booster rockets under the missile. The layout was not that different from Bristol's recently introduced Bloodhound missile. The second proposal was a two-stage solid-fuel rocket known as SIG-15 from BAC, developed partially from BAC's work on the PT.428 which would later emerge as Rapier.

The Admiralty considered the range of the BAC entry, about 16 miles (26 km), to be too short to be useful. The Bristol concept offered a much more useful maximum around 50 miles (80 km). However, they also felt the BAC team, known as Project 502, was better able to manage the project. The Admiralty also demanded that the design be able to be moved about the ship in a fashion similar to gun ammunition, which made the winged RP.25 unsuitable. The result was a redesign effort with BAC designing the airframe and Bristol providing the engine.

=== CF.299 ===
The new design was returned in 1962, and was so promising that the Ministry of Aviation assigned it the name CF.299 and detailed design began.

A 1966 report estimated that CF.299 would have a two-shot kill probability (Pk) against an AS-2 Kipper missile of 0.8–0.9, whereas Seaslug II would manage only 0.35–0.55. Against a supersonic "Blinder" bomber, Pk was 0.5–0.8, compared to 0.3–0.5 for Seaslug. Additionally, because it flew faster than Seaslug, the total engagement time was shorter, and this meant the battery could salvo more rapidly. Finally, its ability to lead the target, compared to Seaslug's beam riding pursuit course, allowed it to attack targets with much higher crossing speeds. A 1968 study suggested Sea Dart would have the same capability as eight F-4 Phantoms on patrol.

By this time, many European navies had chosen the much shorter-range US RIM-24 Tartar surface-to-air missiles for their newer ship designs, but the Dutch Navy was interested in the British missile for a new class of advanced anti-air ships they were designing. The design mounted an advanced radar system, and an agreement was arranged where the Dutch would use the British missile and the RN ships would use the Dutch radar under the name Type 988 "Broomstick". This was a 3D radar with multiple antennas that provided both fast continual scanning as well as multiple independent targeting radars. Both the radar and missiles would be controlled by a new combat direction system being developed by both navies.

Ultimately, the Dutch also chose Tartar for their missile component, leaving the Royal Navy as the Sea Dart's only initial user. The Navy dropped its interest in Broomstick and continued development using simpler radars like the Type 965 radar that was already in service. This had the disadvantage of not being able to pick out targets against a background landform or high waves, significantly limiting its capabilities against low-flying strike aircraft.

=== Into service ===
Sea Dart entered service in 1973 on the sole Type 82 destroyer HMS Bristol before widespread deployment on the Type 42 destroyer commencing with HMS Sheffield in 1976. The missile system was also fitted to Invincible-class aircraft carriers but was removed during refits between 1998 and 2000 to increase the area of the flight deck and below-decks stowage associated with the operation of Royal Air Force (RAF) Harrier GR9 aircraft.

In 1982, British Aerospace won a £100m contract to sell the Sea Dart system to China, but this fell through in 1983, with Chinese minister Chen Muhua explaining that China was "not satisfied with the price, technology or production".

=== Proposed versions ===
During the late 1970s, British Aerospace proposed a Sea Dart II, which replaced the original's transistor-based electronics with integrated circuits that so reduced the size of the equipment that it allowed for a useful increase in fuel storage and range. British Aerospace also outlined a new version of the Chow booster that included thrust vector control that would allow it to be stored vertically on new platforms or make radical manoeuvres when launching from the existing launch rail systems. Development was cancelled in the 1980 Defence Review by the Minister of Defence, John Nott. Another short-lived project was Sea Daws 100, which used a single-rail launcher for a future Type 82 replacement.

Hawker Siddeley Dynamics, which had taken over Bristol, proposed using the Sea Dart missile as a replacement for both the British Army's Thunderbird and the RAF's Bloodhound. This Land Dart was launched from a four-round box that would be highly mobile. Hawker Siddeley Dynamics suggested that if the missile was used by all three British services, it would result in further sales as a NATO-standard SAM. The introduction of the VR.725 Thunderbird II led the Army to drop any interest in Land Dart, and the NATO contract eventually went to the MIM-23 Hawk.

Hawker Siddeley tried again in the 1970s when the Air Staff released GAST.1210, calling for a long-range missile to replace Bloodhound. They proposed a further updated Land Dart combined with a dramatically improved radar system, the Plessey GF75 Panther, a land-based version of the naval AWS-5. This concept ultimately went nowhere and the Bloodhound was removed from service in 1991 with no replacement. In the early 1980s, British Aerospace (BAe), who had taken over Hawker, re-launched the GAST.1210 concept under the new name Guardian. This proposed a lightweight two-round launcher and mobile version of Panther to be used as both a SAM and an anti-missile for short-range ballistic missiles like SCUD. Despite interest from the Middle East, no sales followed. The same launcher was also offered as Lightweight Sea Dart, which used its disposable shipping container as the launch tube, which was fit into a four-place trainable launcher that could also mount Sea Eagle. Most of the weight savings was in the launcher itself, allowing it to be fit to smaller ships.

=== Updates ===
Experience in the Falklands War demonstrated that the mix of systems used to support Sea Dart put it at a significant disadvantage despite the missile itself being highly potent. This led to a series of updates to both the missile and the radars equipping the Sheffield-class destroyers.

The first upgrade was to replace the older Type 965 radar with the much better Type 1022. The Navy had originally planned on replacing the 965 with a new radar, then known as STIR, when it became available. As it became clear that STIR would not be available for some time, Marconi offered an interim model, the 1022. This had a new antenna design that greatly reduced the beamwidth from around 12 degrees to 2.3, and used a shaped broadcast pattern that greatly reduced the amount of signal that was aimed at waves and thereby reduced clutter.

The 1022 arrived in time to equip the "Batch II" Sheffields, which began in 1978 with HMS Exeter. Initially they had planned to re-equip the earlier ships as well, but as the new ships started arriving all desire to spend the money on the upgrades disappeared. As many of the problems with the Sea Dart could be traced to the failure of the 965 to provide any early warning against low-level engagements, the ability to offer dramatically improved performance with a relatively simple update that had been planned all along was suddenly considered very important.

== Design ==
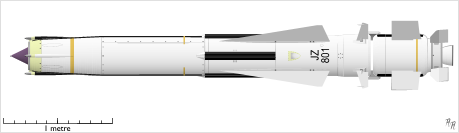
Sea Dart missile illustration. The Chow booster is on the extreme right. The four small receiver antennas for the semi-active radar homing are visible on the left. The antennas are arranged to provide phase-comparison to improve accuracy.

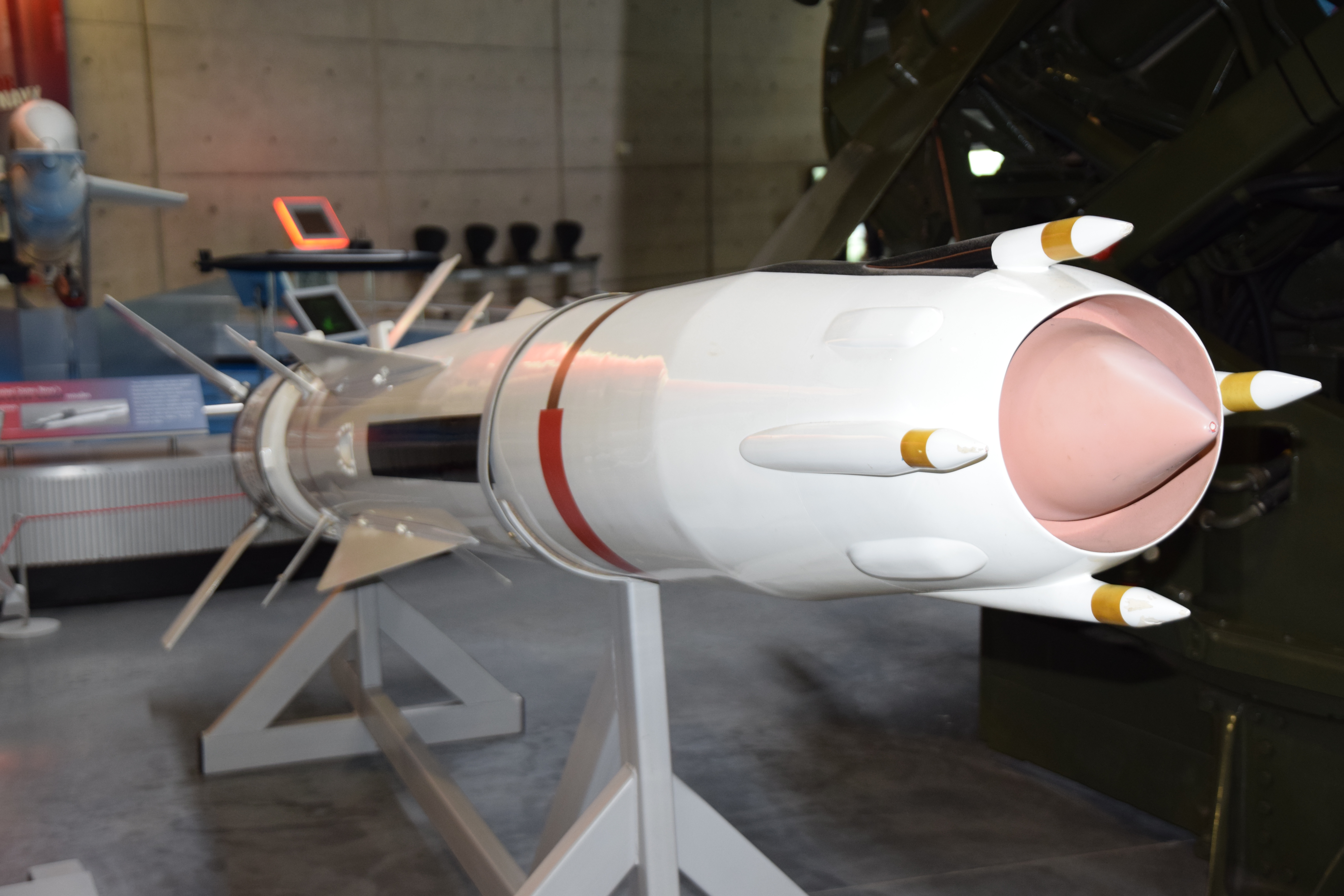
Pink ramjet air intake

Sea Dart is a two-stage, 4.4-metre (14 ft) long missile weighing 550 kilograms (1,210 lb). It is launched using a drop-off Chow solid-fuel booster that accelerates it to the supersonic speed necessary for the operation of the cruise motor, a Rolls-Royce /Bristol Siddeley kerosene-fuelled Odin ramjet. This gives a cruise speed of over Mach 2.5, and unlike many rocket-powered designs, the cruise engine burns for the entire flight, giving excellent terminal manoeuvrability at extreme range.

It is capable of engaging targets out to at least 30 nautical miles (35 mi; 56 km) over a wide range of altitudes. It has a secondary capability against small surface vessels, tested against a Brave-class patrol boat, although in surface mode the warhead safety arming unit does not arm, and thus damage inflicted is restricted to the physical impact of the half-ton missile body and the unspent proportion of the 46 litres (10 imp gal; 12 US gal) of kerosene fuel.

Guidance is by proportional navigation and a semi-active radar homing system using the nose intake cone and four aerials around the intake as an interferometer aerial, with targets being identified by a Type 1022 surveillance radar (originally radar Type 965) and illuminated by one of a pair of radar Type 909. This allows two targets to be engaged simultaneously in initial versions, with later variants able to engage more. Firing is from a twin-arm trainable launcher that is loaded automatically from below decks. The original launcher seen on HMS Bristol was significantly larger than that which appeared on Type 42 and Invincible classes. Initial difficulties with launcher reliability were resolved.

== Combat service ==
=== Falklands War ===
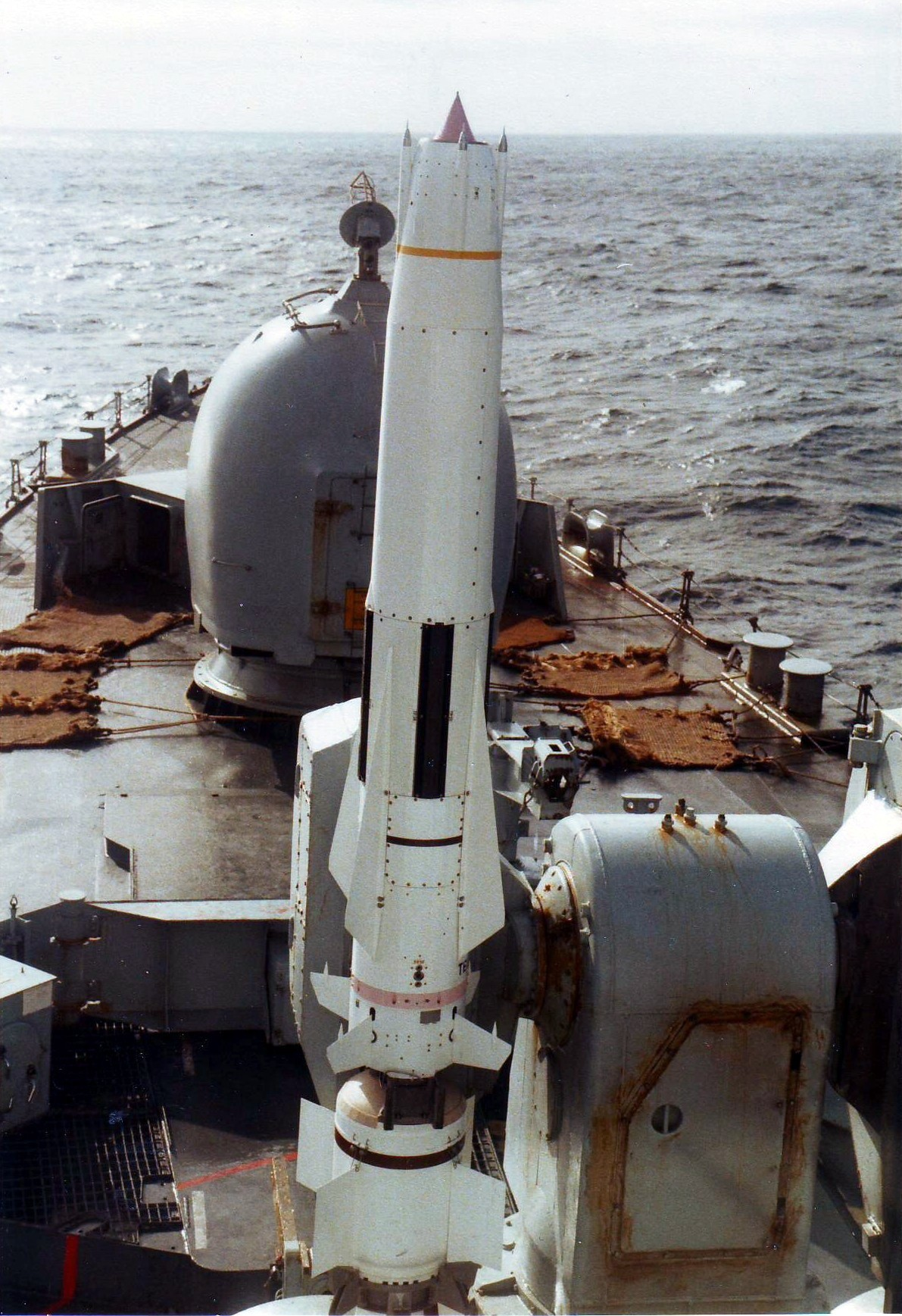
Sea Dart on Cardiff in 1982 (taken after the Falklands War had ended)

Sea Dart was used during the Falklands War (1982) and is credited with seven confirmed kills, plus a British Westland Gazelle helicopter by friendly fire. Kills were made against high-flying aircraft beyond the missile's stated technical envelope and low-flying attack aircraft.

The net effect of Sea Dart was to deny higher altitudes to enemy aircraft. This was important because Argentine aircraft such as the Dassault Mirage III had better straight-line performance than the British Aerospace Sea Harriers, which were unlikely to successfully intercept them.

The first Sea Dart engagement was against an Aérospatiale Puma on 9 May 1982 near Stanley by HMS Coventry, with the loss of the three men aboard.

On 25 May 1982 a Douglas A-4C Skyhawk of Grupo 5 was shot down north of Pebble Island by Coventry. The pilot, Capitán Hugo Angel del Valle Palaver, was killed. Later, Coventry shot down another Skyhawk of Grupo 4 while it was returning from a mission to San Carlos Water. Capitán Jorge Osvaldo García successfully ejected but was not recovered. The next Argentine action that day sank Coventry. An unguided Sea Dart was launched in an effort to disrupt the attack but missed, and the destroyer was struck by two iron bombs and sank.

On the same day, two Dassault-Breguet Super Étendard strike fighters sought to attack the British carrier group with Exocet missiles, but instead struck the cargo ship MV Atlantic Conveyor. Invincible reportedly fired six Sea Darts in less than two minutes, but all missed.

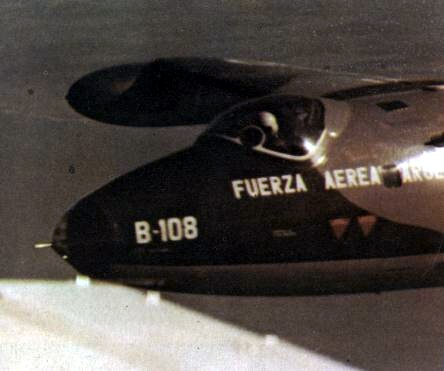
Canberra bomber B-108 of Grupo de Bombardeo 2. This Argentine aircraft was shot down by a Sea Dart on 13 June 1982.

On 30 May 1982, during the last Exocet air attacks against the British fleet, HMS Exeter shot down two Skyhawks (out of four), despite their flying only 10 metres (33 ft) above the sea (below Sea Dart's theoretical minimum engagement altitude of 30 metres (98 ft)). On 6 June Exeter shot down a Learjet 35A being used for reconnaissance at 12,000 metres (39,000 ft).

On 6 June 1982, Cardiff fired a Sea Dart missile at an aircraft believed to be an Argentine C-130 Hercules. The missile destroyed the aircraft, which was in fact a British Army helicopter. All four occupants were killed in this friendly-fire incident.

Finally, on 13 June 1982, an English Electric Canberra flying at 12,000 metres (39,000 ft) en route to bomb British troops near Port Harriet House was destroyed by a Sea Dart fired from Exeter.

In total at least eighteen missiles were launched by Type 42 destroyers, six by Invincible, and two by Bristol. Out of five missiles fired against helicopters or high-flying aircraft, four were successful, but only two of nineteen fired at low-level aircraft hit: just eleven per cent; however, a number of missiles were fired without guidance to deter low-level attacks. Exeter's success can be partially attributed to being equipped with the Type 1022 radar, which provided greater capability than the older Type 965 fitted to earlier Type 42s.

The Type 965 was unable to cope with low-level targets as it suffered multiple path crossings and targets became lost in radar clutter from the surface of the South Atlantic. This resulted in Sea Dart being unable to lock onto targets at distance obscured by land, or fast-moving low-level targets obscured in ground clutter or sea returns.

The Argentine Navy was aware of the Sea Dart's capabilities and limitations, having two Type 42s of its own. Consequently, Argentine planes, opting to fly below the Type 965 radar ("sea skimming"), frequently dropped bombs which failed to explode, as the arming vane on the bomb had insufficient time to complete the number of revolutions required to arm the fuze.

=== Persian Gulf War (1991) ===
In February 1991 during the Persian Gulf War the battleship USS Missouri was operating in the Persian Gulf. Her battlegroup included a number of escorts, including the Type 42 destroyer HMS Gloucester. On 24 February, Missouri was fired on by a pair of Silkworm anti-ship missiles. Although one missed completely, the other was engaged and destroyed by a Sea Dart fired by HMS Gloucester after it had flown over the target, while another of the battleship's escorts, the frigate USS Jarrett, attempted to engage with its Phalanx CIWS, but succeeded only in firing at the chaff launched by Missouri, resulting in hits on Missouri.

== Variants ==
The Sea Dart was upgraded over the years - notably its electronics - as technology advanced. The following modification standards have been fielded:

Mod 0
Basic 1960s version, used in the Falklands. valve technology. Range circa 40 nmi (46 mi; 74 km).
Mod 1
Improved Sea Dart. Upgraded version 1983–1986. Updated guidance systems possibly allowing some capability against sea-skimming targets and much greater reliability.
Mod 2
1989–1991. Upgrade included ADIMP (Air Defence IMProvement) which saw the replacement of six old circuit cards in the guidance system with one, allowing the spare volume to be used for an autopilot. Used alongside a command datalink (sited on the Type 909 pedestal) it allows several missiles to be 'in the air' at once, re-targeted during flight etc. and allows an initial ballistic trajectory, doubling range to 80 nmi (92 mi; 150 km) with the upgraded 909(I) radar for terminal illumination only.
Mod 3
Latest version with new infrared fuze. Delayed eight years from 1994 to 2002.

The Sea Dart Mark 2, GWS 31, (also known as Sea Dart II - not to be confused with Mod 2, above) development was cancelled in 1981. This was intended to allow 'off the rail' manoeuvres with additional controls added to the booster. The Mark 2 was reduced to Advanced Sea Dart, then Enhanced Sea Dart and finally Improved Sea Dart.

Lightweight Sea Dart was a version with minimal changes to the missile itself, but based in a new sealed box-launcher. A four-box trainable launcher was developed that allowed it to be mounted to ships as small as 300 tons displacement. The same box and launcher could also support the Sea Eagle SL, the proposed ship-launched version of Sea Eagle. Guardian was a proposed land-based system of radars, control stations and the Lightweight Sea Dart proposed in the 1980s for use as a land-based air defence system for the Falkland Islands. Neither system was put into production.

== Withdrawal ==
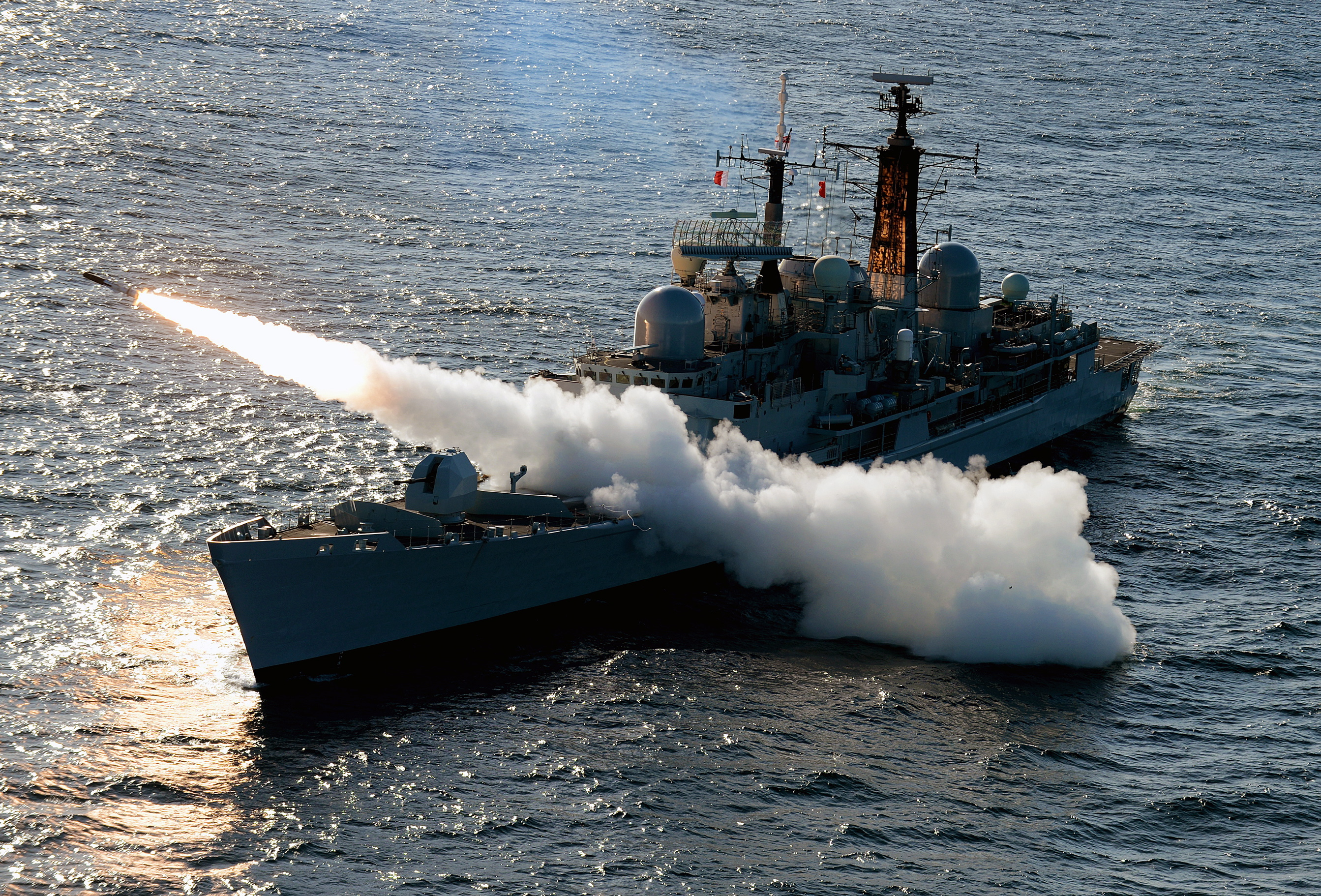
HMS Edinburgh conducting the final Sea Dart missile firing at the north-western Scottish range of Benbecula. The ship fired five missiles, three single missiles and a two-missile salvo at an unmanned drone target.

The Sea Dart-equipped Type 42s were replaced by the larger Type 45, which are armed with the Sea Viper missile system, significantly more capable in the anti-air role. The first-of-class, Daring, entered service in 2009.

On 13 April 2012, HMS Edinburgh fired the last operational Sea Dart missiles. The last two remaining Type 42s, York and Edinburgh, completed their careers without the system being operational.

A launcher with drill missiles has been preserved and is on display at Explosion! Museum of Naval Firepower, Gosport, Hampshire.

== Operators ==
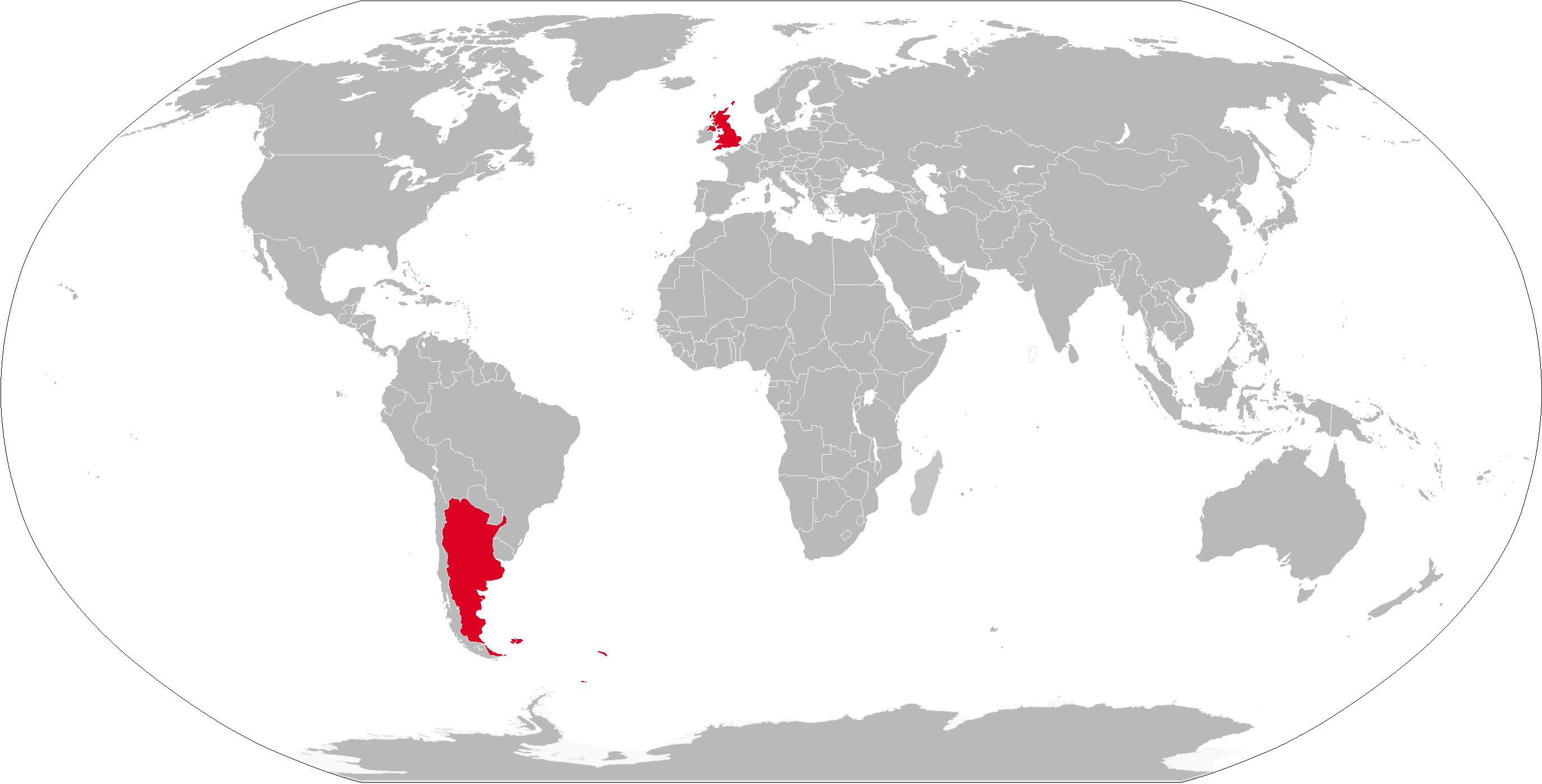
Map with former Sea Dart operators in red

=== Former operators ===
Argentina
- Argentine Navy: Purchased 60 missiles for their two Type 42 destroyers but retired them in 1987 due to lack of spares.
United Kingdom
- Royal Navy
