= HMS Edinburgh (D97) =

Type 42 destroyer

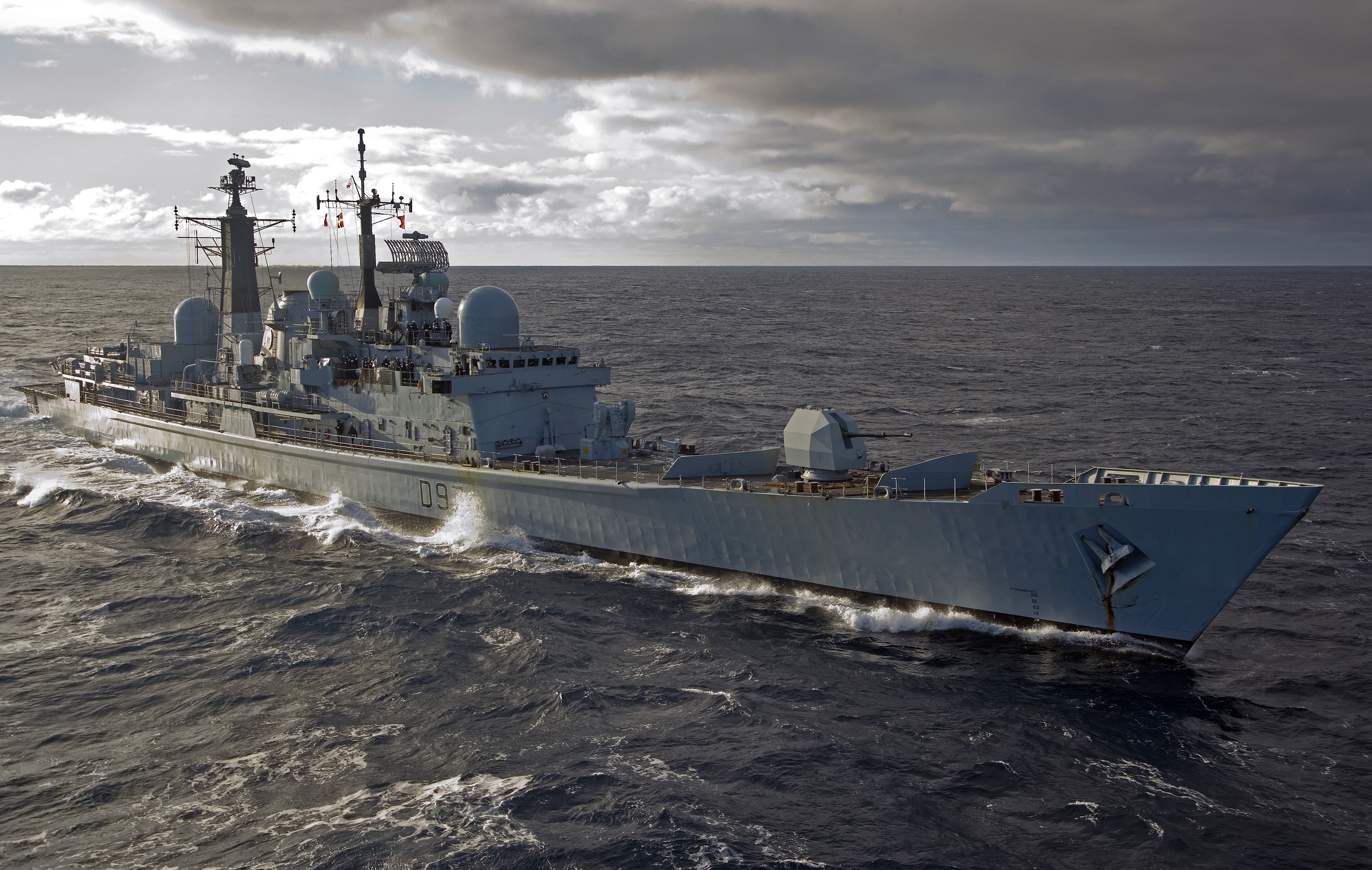
- HMS Edinburgh on patrol near the Falkland Islands.

History

United Kingdom
- Name: HMS Edinburgh
- Builder: Cammell Laird
- Laid down: 8 September 1980
- Launched: 14 April 1983
- Sponsored by: Ann Heseltine; wife of Michael Heseltine
- Commissioned: 17 December 1985
- Decommissioned: 6 June 2013
- Home port: HMNB Portsmouth
- Identification: Pennant number: D97; Deck code: EB; International callsign: GBBE
- Nickname(s): "Fortress of the Sea"
- Fate: Scrapped
- Badge: On a Field White, upon a mount of rock in base Proper, a castle, triple turreted, mason White. The flags, windows and portcullis Red.

General characteristics
- Class & type: Type 42 destroyer
- Displacement: 5,200 tonnes
- Length: 141 m (463 ft)
- Beam: 15.2 m (50 ft)
- Propulsion: COGOG (Combined Gas or Gas) turbines, 2 x Rolls-Royce Olympus, 2 x Tyne, 2 shafts; 2 turbines producing 36 MW (48,000 hp)
- Speed: 34 kn (63 km/h; 39 mph)
- Complement: 269
- Armament: 1 × Twin Sea Dart missile launcher (total of 40 missiles); 1 × 4.5 in (110 mm) Mk 8 gun; 2 × 20 mm Oerlikon guns; 2 × Phalanx Close-in weapon system (CIWS); 2 × Triple anti-submarine torpedo tubes
- Aircraft carried: Lynx Mk 8 SRU armed with: 3 × anti ship missiles; 2 × anti submarine torpedoes

HMS Edinburgh was a Type 42-class guided missile destroyer of the Royal Navy. Edinburgh was built by Cammell Laird of Birkenhead. She was launched on 14 April 1983 and commissioned on 17 December 1985. The largest of the Type 42 destroyers, Edinburgh was known as the "Fortress of the Sea". Edinburgh was the last of the Type 42 destroyer to serve in the Royal Navy and was decommissioned on 6 June 2013.

== Distinctive appearance ==
Edinburgh's distinctive forecastle

Edinburgh was readily distinguished by her distinctively different forecastle. When it was decided to fit the Phalanx CIWS to this class of warships, it was intended that Edinburgh should carry a single CIWS unit, mounted forward between her 4.5-inch gun and the Sea Dart launcher. To this end, her breakwaters were enlarged and she was fitted with a raised bulwark, very like those carried on the Type 22 frigates.

This location proved to be an unsuitably wet one for the Phalanx system despite the modifications to this warship, and Edinburgh was later fitted with a pair of wing-mounted CIWS as carried by the other ships of the class, but she retained her distinctive bulwark and enlarged breakwaters.

== Operations ==
=== 1990-2001 ===
In 1990, Edinburgh completed a refit, which included the fitting of the Phalanx Close-in weapon system (CIWS). In 1994, Edinburgh was present at a Fleet Review to celebrate the 50th Anniversary of the D-Day landings in 1944. In 1998, Edinburgh deployed to the South Atlantic, where she patrolled the waters around the Falkland Islands, as well as making 'fly-the-flag' visits to various South American ports.

=== 2002-2010 ===
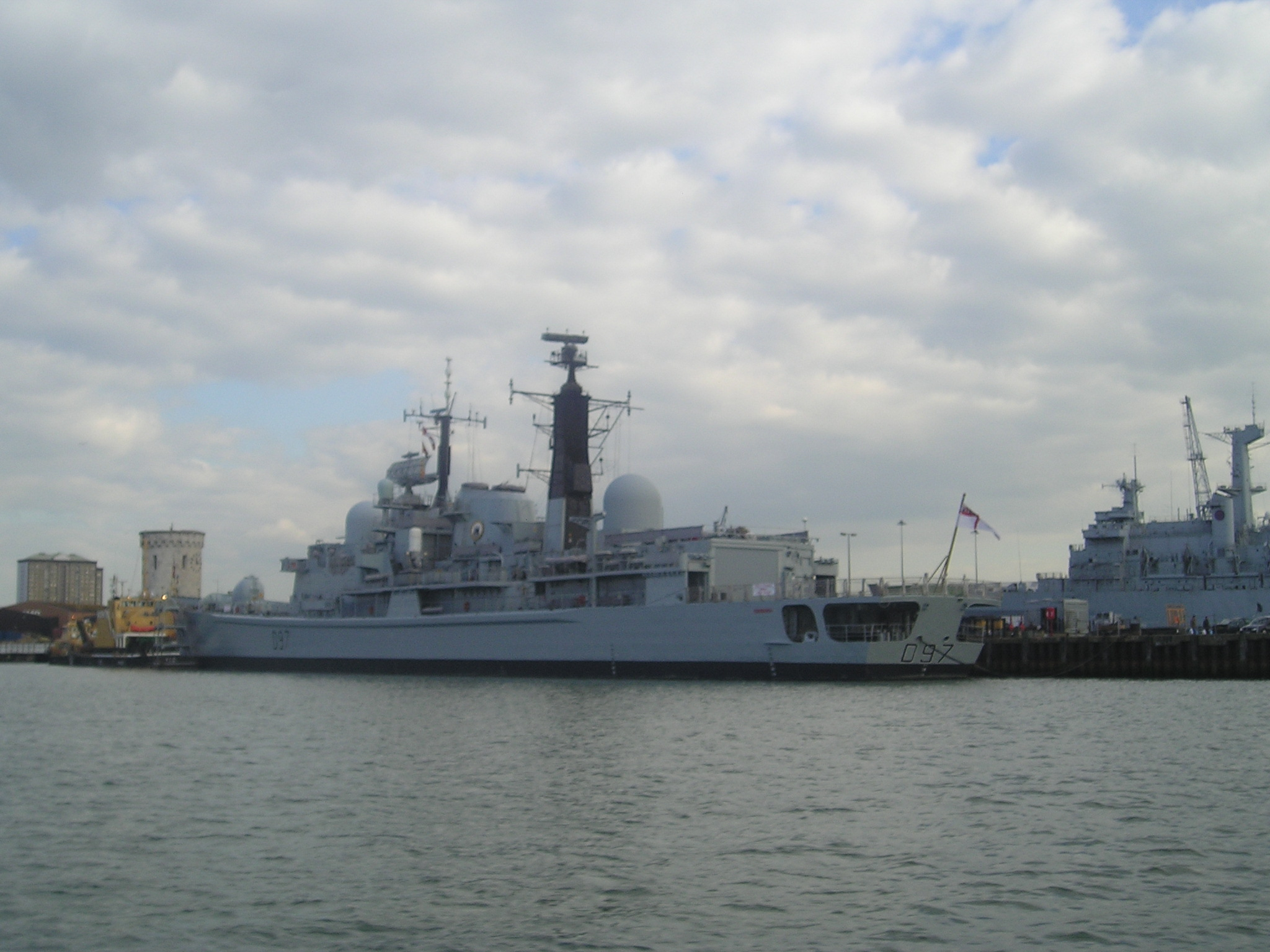
Edinburgh, Portsmouth, 2004.

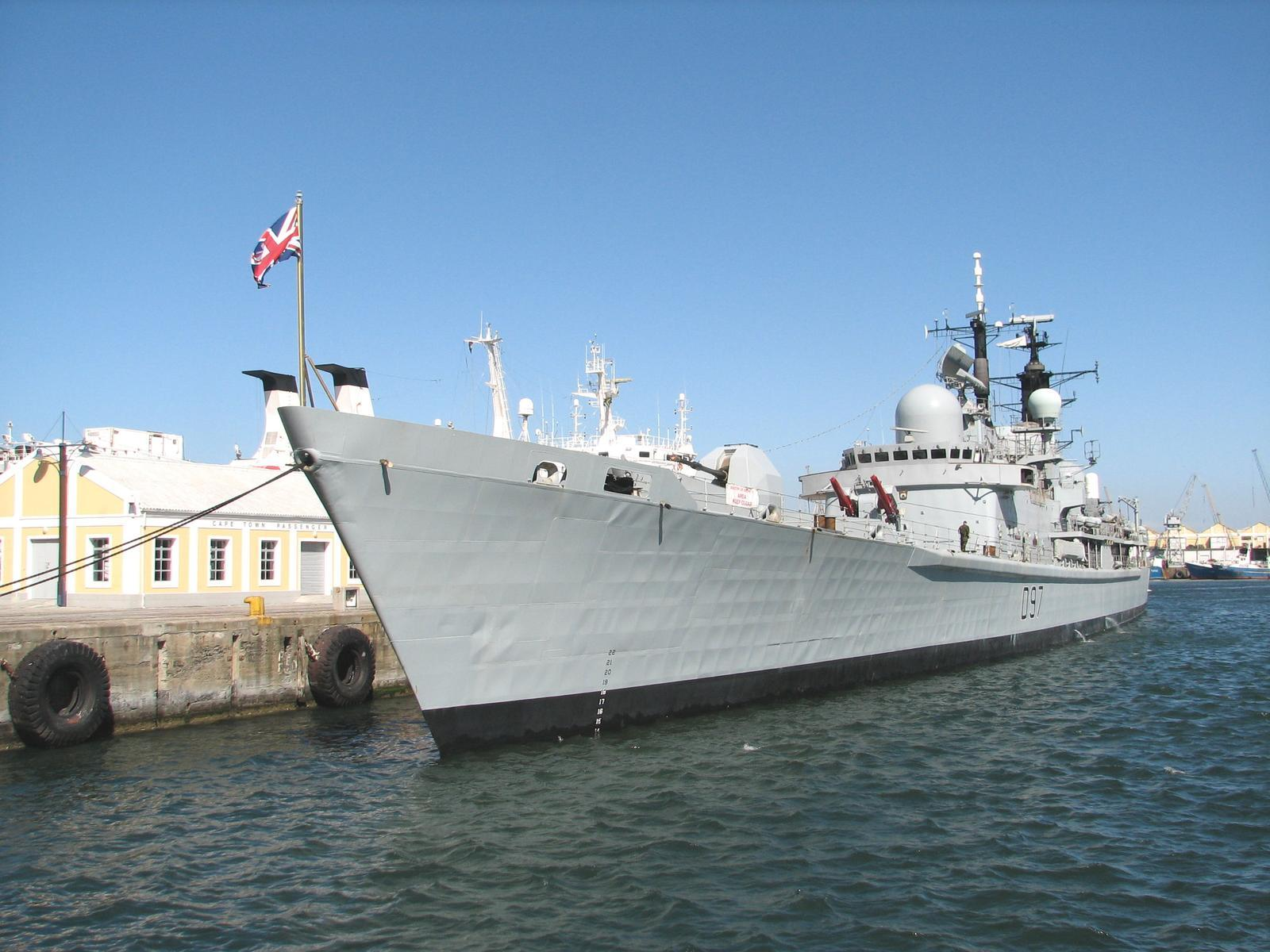
Edinburgh Cape Town, 2006.

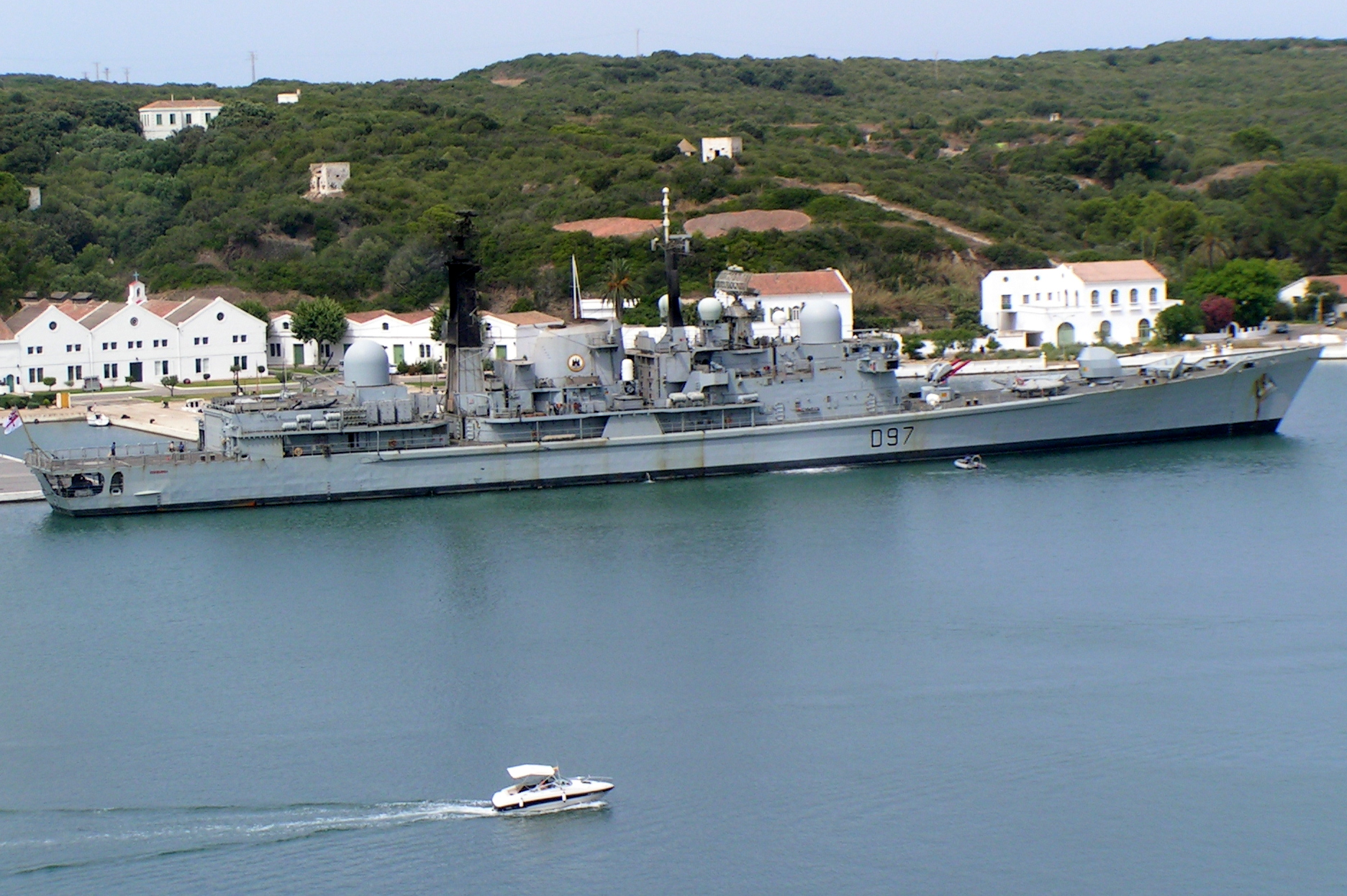
Edinburgh at Mahon, Minorca, July 2008.

On 27 September 2002, Edinburgh sailed into the River Mersey to escort the yachts at the end of the Clipper Round the World Yacht Race.

In January 2003, Edinburgh deployed to the Persian Gulf and subsequently took part in the Second Gulf War against the dictator Saddam Hussein. While there, Edinburgh performed a variety of tasks, which included supporting the Royal Marines ashore, as well as being escort to the helicopter carrier Ocean. She returned to her home base at Portsmouth in May. In April 2004, Edinburgh deployed to the Mediterranean, where she first joined Standing Naval Force Mediterranean (STANAVFORMED), and while there she took part in Operation Active Endeavour, designed to monitor sea lanes as part of the war on terror.

On her return to the UK, Edinburgh went into an extensive refit in Rosyth. She left Rosyth in September 2005 to conduct trials to ensure that she was materially up to operational standard before conducting operational sea training in the New Year. Edinburgh then took part in Exercise Neptune Warrior off the coast of Scotland; conducted a High Seas Firing of her Sea Dart missile system and then took part in the multi-national BALTOPS exercise in the Baltic Sea. The time in the Baltic included visits to Sweden, Germany and Estonia. During the visit to Estonia, Edinburgh took part in the naval parade celebrating an Estonian national holiday.

In autumn 2006 Edinburgh deployed to the Falkland Islands remaining there until June 2007. The extended nature of the deployment was made possible by the "Sea Swap" trial, an initiative to try and extend operational deployments by keeping the ship in theatre and swapping crews; in this case the crews of HMS Exeter and Edinburgh. The swap was completed in March and while not an unqualified success, it did achieve the object of the trial in keeping a ship on station for a longer period of time. Edinburgh was the centre piece for the 25th anniversary celebration of the liberation of the Falkland Islands in June 2007 and she finally returned home to Portsmouth in August 2007 via, Rio de Janeiro, Fortaleze in Brazil and Tenerife. The crews of both ships then "unswapped" in September 2007.

Edinburgh was deployed to the Middle and Far East from February until late July 2008 as part of Orion 2008, including a visit to Singapore and operations in the Gulf, during which she took part in an interception of a drugs cargo.

=== 2010 refit ===
Edinburgh became the last Type 42 destroyer to undergo a refit when she entered dry dock on 25 January 2010 at BAE Systems Surface Ships shipyard in Portsmouth Naval Base for work to keep the ship in service until 2013.

Under a £17.5 million contract, the company refurbished the destroyer's weapons and communications systems, added a transom flap to the stern and applied a coat of International Paint's Intersleek 900 foul-release paint. The refit included a renewal of crew living quarters, catering facilities and laundry equipment. Edinburgh's four Rolls-Royce gas turbine engines were removed; with two being replaced by new units (starboard Olympus TM3B and port Tyne RM1C). In a company statement on 18 January 2010, BAE Systems said that the modifications would cut fuel consumption by 15 per cent.

Edinburgh emerged from refit in September 2010 to undergo sea trials that include testing the ship's propulsion machinery, radar and communication equipment, as well as her ability to conduct flying operations. Edinburgh's signatures were assessed for radar cross section, heat, magnetic and acoustics before trials culminating in live firings of medium and close range weapons. The ship was formally accepted back into the fleet in late October 2010, followed by a rededication ceremony in early November.

=== 2011-2013 ===
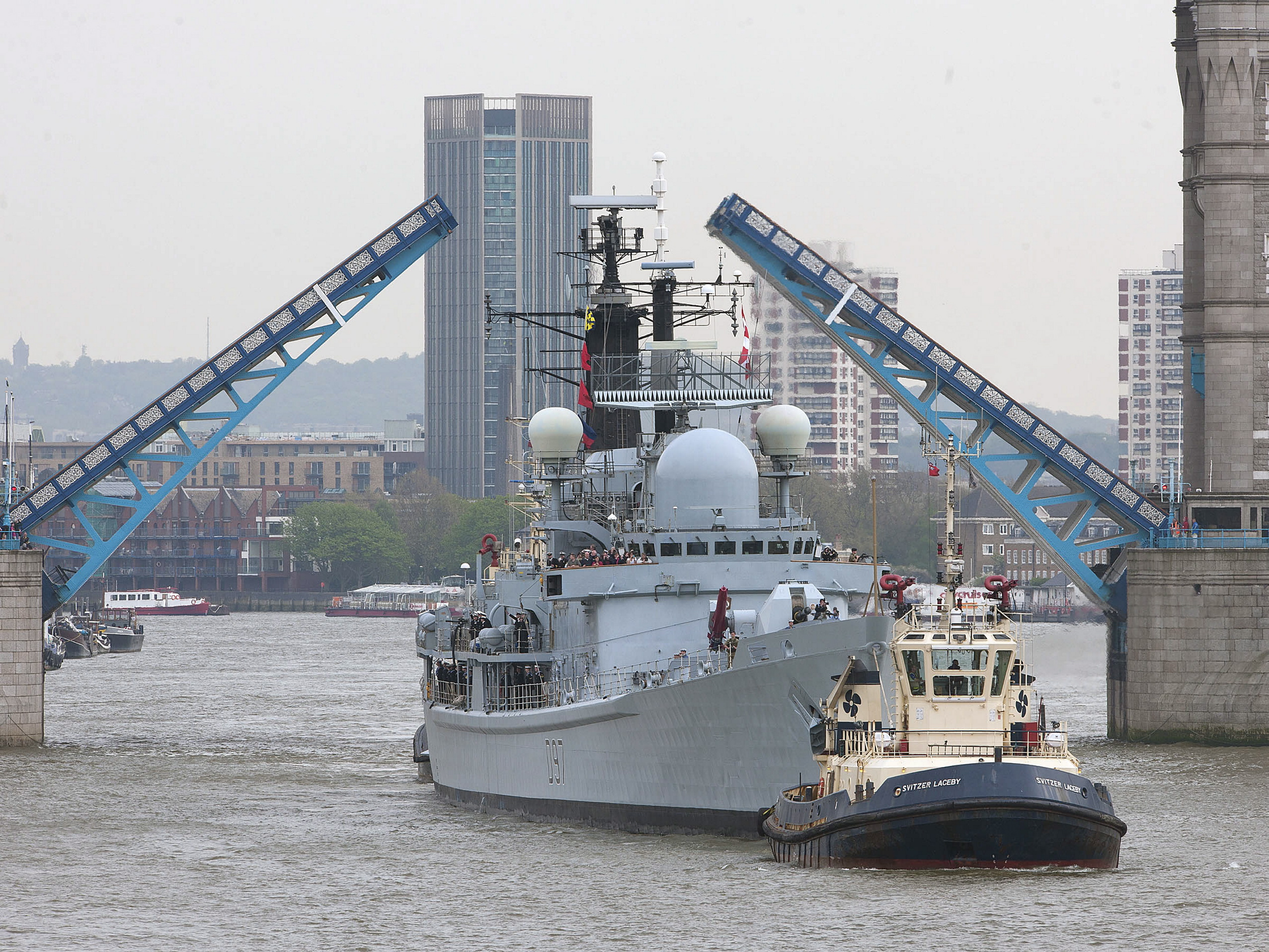
HMS Edinburgh being towed under Tower Bridge on a visit to London just prior to decommissioning.

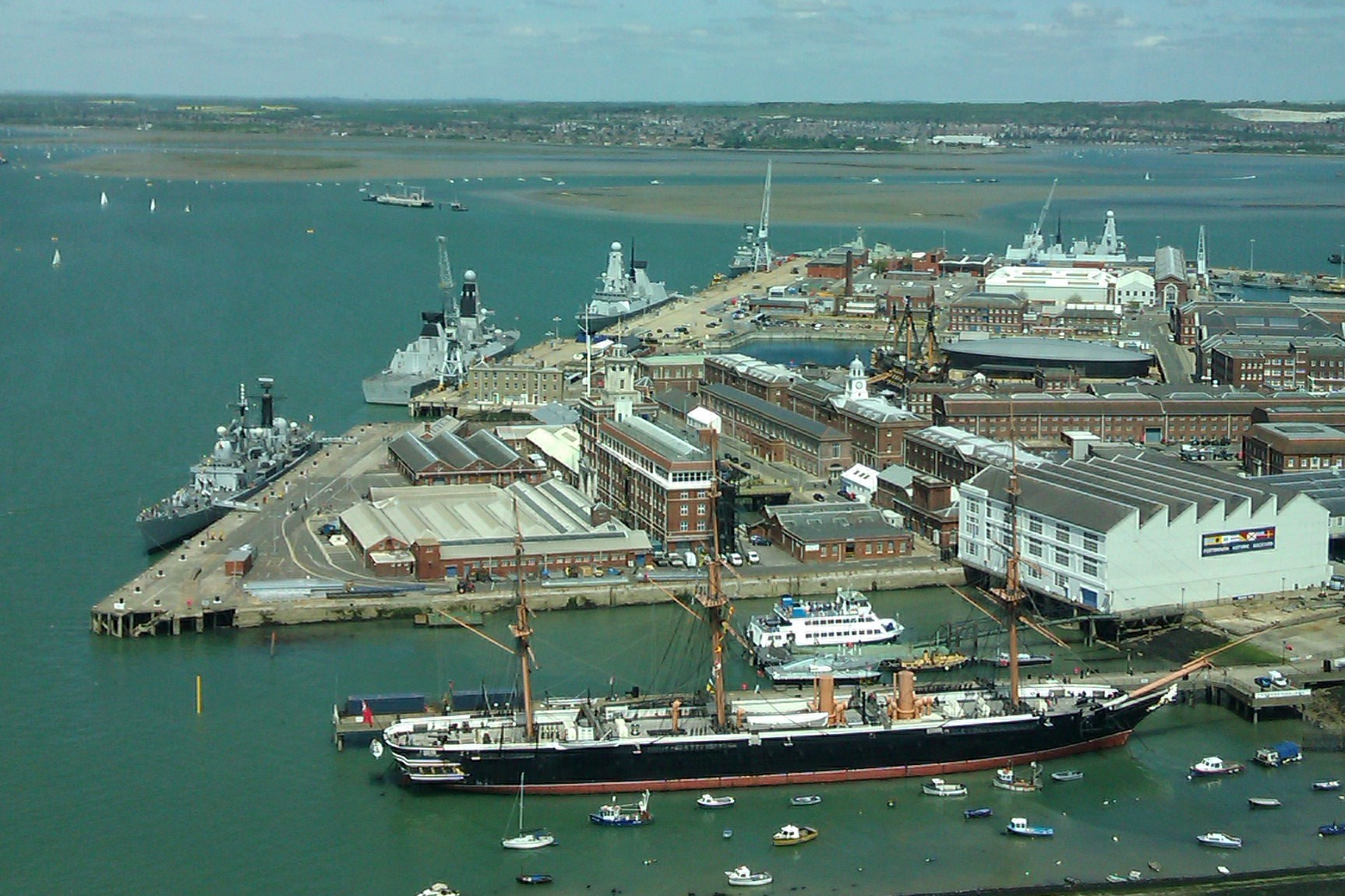
HMS Edinburgh with HMS Defender (D36) and HMS Duncan (D37) at Portsmouth, 1 June 2013

In April 2011 Edinburgh successfully completed Sea-Dart missile firing trials. May 2011 saw the ship begin an eight-month deployment visiting the Cape Verde and Falkland Islands. On 13 April 2012 Edinburgh fired the last ever operational Sea Dart missiles after a thirty-year career. The last two remaining Type 42s, York and Edinburgh completed their careers without the system being operational.

On 7 May 2013 Edinburgh arrived in the Pool of London, at the start of a farewell tour of Great Britain. She called at Edinburgh from 15 to 21 May, followed by Cammell Laird, Birkenhead, where she was built. Her final call on the tour was Lyme Regis on 29 May, prior to sailing for Portsmouth for decommissioning. She arrived in Portsmouth on 31 May and was open to the public there on 1 and 2 June. She was decommissioned on 6 June.

== Fate ==
In May 2013 a campaign was launched to bring Edinburgh to the Port of Leith and convert her into a museum. However this was not successful and Edinburgh departed Portsmouth on 12 August 2015 under tow to be scrapped in Turkey.

== Affiliations ==
- The Royal Scots Borderers, 1st Battalion Royal Regiment of Scotland
- No. 8 Squadron RAF
- City of Edinburgh Branch, Royal Naval Association
