= ARA Granville (P-33) =

Drummond-class corvette of the Argentine Navy

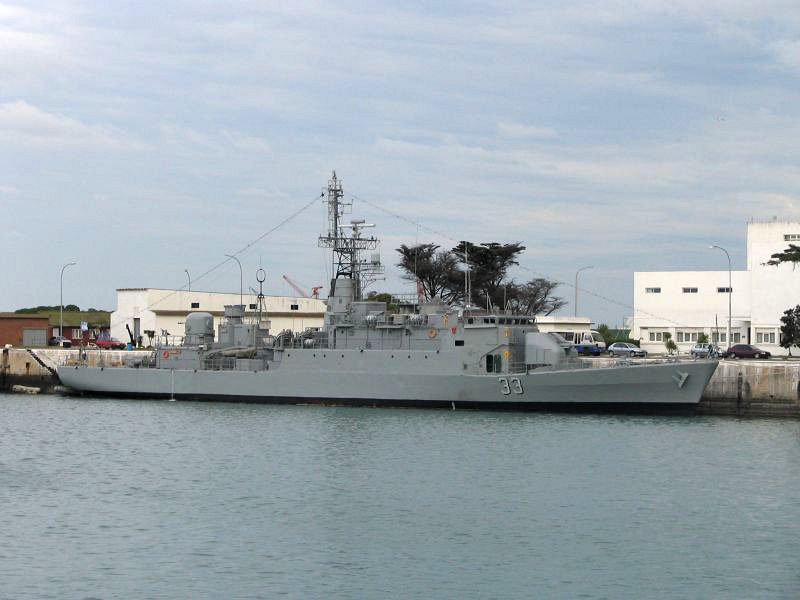
- ARA Granville at Mar del Plata naval base in 2005

History

Argentina
- Namesake: Guillermo Enrique Granville
- Operator: Argentine Navy
- Laid down: 1 December 1978
- Launched: 28 June 1980
- Commissioned: 22 June 1981
- Decommissioned: 31 August 2024
- Home port: Mar del Plata
- Status: Retired

General characteristics
- Class & type: Type A69 Drummond-class corvette
- Displacement: 1,170 tons (1,320 tons full load)
- Length: 80 m (260 ft)
- Beam: 10.3 m (34 ft)
- Draught: 3.55 m (11.6 ft)
- Installed power: 12,000 shp (8.9 MW)
- Propulsion: 2× SEMT Pielstick 12 PC 2.2 V400 diesels, 2× controllable pitch propellers
- Speed: 23.3 knots (43 km/h)
- Range: 4,500 nautical miles (8,330 km) at 16 knots (30 km/h)
- Endurance: 15 days
- Complement: 5 officers, 79 enlisted, 95 berths
- Sensors & processing systems: Thales DRBV 51A air/surface search; Thales DRBC-32E fire control; Consilium Selesmar NavBat; Thales Diodon hull MF sonar
- Electronic warfare & decoys: Thales DR 2000 S3; Thales Alligator 51 jammer; 2× Matra Dagaie decoys
- Armament: 4× MM38 Exocet anti-ship missiles (As of 2020, work underway to maintain the missile's operational relevance); 1× 100 mm/55 Mod.1968 dual purpose gun; 1× twin Bofors 40 mm L/70 AA guns; 2× 20 mm Oerlikon AA guns; 2× .50cal Colt M2 machine guns; 2× triple 324 mm ILAS-3 tubes (WASS A-244S torpedoes)
- Aviation facilities: small pad for VERTREP

ARA Granville (P-33) was a Drummond-class corvette of the Argentine Navy named after Guillermo Enrique Granville, who fought in the 1827 Battle of Juncal against Brazil.

Up until 2024 she was based at Mar del Plata, and had for many years been conducting fishery patrol duties in the Argentine exclusive economic zone where she captured several trawlers.

According to reports in November 2012 the Drummond class "hardly sail[ed] because of lack of resources for operational expenses". As of 2020, only Granville was reported to be operational, having undergone a refit in mid-2019, with the other ships of the class in reserve. Granville was retired in August 2024.

== Service history ==
The first two ships of the Drummond class were built in 1977 in France for the South African Navy. The sale was embargoed by United Nations Security Council Resolution 418 during sea trials, and the ships were sold to Argentina instead. A third ship was ordered and entered service as ARA Granville on 22 June 1981, in time for the Falklands War the following year. There are minor differences in equipment fit compared to her sisters, for instance Granville has French Degaie decoys rather than the British Corvus chaff launchers.

On 28 March 1982 she sailed with her sister ARA Drummond and took up station northeast of Port Stanley to cover the main amphibious landings on 2 April. After the attack she operated north of the Falklands with her sister ships as Task Group 79.4, hoping to catch ships detached from the British task force. On 29 April the corvettes were trailed by the submarine HMS Splendid while she was looking for the Argentine aircraft carrier ARA Veinticinco de Mayo, but they managed to outrun the British submarine.

Granville carried the P-3 pennant number until the introduction of the Espora-class corvettes in 1985, when she became P-33. In 1994, Granville and her sisters participated in Operation Uphold Democracy, the United Nations blockade of Haiti. During this time, she was based at Roosevelt Roads Naval Station in Puerto Rico.

According to British reports, in 1995 Granville harassed a number of trawlers around the Falklands and confronted and illuminated the British forward repair ship RFA Diligence with her radar.
