= ARA Drummond (P-31) =

1978 Drummond class corvette of the Argentine Navy

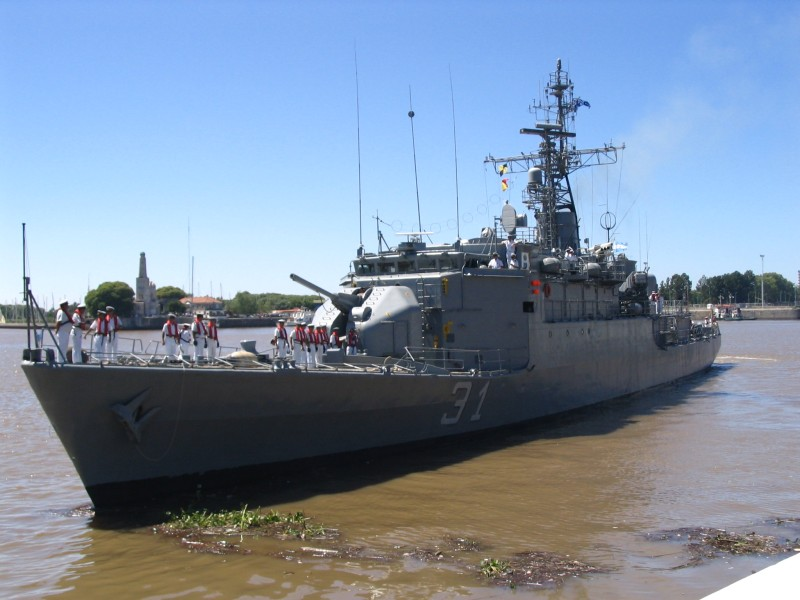
- ARA Drummond

History

South Africa
- Name: SAS Good Hope
- Namesake: Cape of Good Hope
- Ordered: February 1976
- Builder: Lorient, France
- Laid down: 12 March 1976
- Launched: 5 March 1977
- Out of service: 17 November 1977
- Fate: Delivery blocked by UNSCR 418 during sea trials in France

Argentina
- Renamed: ARA Drummond
- Namesake: Francisco Drummond
- Ordered: 1978
- Commissioned: 9 November 1978
- Home port: Mar del Plata
- Fate: To be auctioned off as of 2024
- Status: Out of service

General characteristics
- Class & type: Type A69 Drummond-class corvette
- Displacement: 1,170 tons (1,320 tons full load)
- Length: 80 m (260 ft)
- Beam: 10.3 m (34 ft)
- Draught: 3.55 m (11.6 ft)
- Installed power: 12,000 shp (8.9 MW)
- Propulsion: 2 × SEMT Pielstick 12 PC 2.2 V400 diesels, 2 × controllable pitch propellers
- Speed: 23.3 knots (43 km/h)
- Range: 4,500 nautical miles (8,330 km) at 16 knots (30 km/h)
- Endurance: 15 days
- Complement: 5 officers, 79 enlisted, 95 berths
- Sensors & processing systems: Thales DRBV 51A air/surface search; Thales DRBC-32E fire control; Consilium Selesmar NavBat; Thales Diodon hull MF sonar
- Electronic warfare & decoys: Thales DR 2000 S3; Thales Alligator 51 jammer; 2 × 18 Corvus decoys
- Armament: 4 × MM38 Exocet anti-ship missiles; 1 × 100 mm/55 Mod.1968 dual purpose gun; 1 × twin Bofors 40 mm L/70 AA guns; 2 × 20 mm Oerlikon AA guns; 2 × .50cal Colt M2 machine guns; 2 × triple 324 mm ILAS-3 tubes (WASS A-244S torpedoes)
- Aviation facilities: small pad for VERTREP

ARA Drummond (P-31) was the lead ship of the Drummond class of three corvettes of the Argentine Navy. She was the second vessel to be named after Scottish-born Navy Sergeant Major Francisco Drummond.

She was based at Mar del Plata and conducted fishery patrol duties in the Argentine exclusive economic zone, where she captured several trawlers. According to reports in November 2012 the Drummond class "hardly sail[ed] because of lack of resources for operational expenses".

== Service history ==
Drummond was built in 1977 in France for the South African Navy to be named SAS Good Hope but was embargoed at the last minute by United Nations Security Council Resolution 418 over apartheid. The vessel was sold to Argentina instead and delivered on 9 November 1978.

She carried the pennant number P-1 until the introduction of the Espora-class corvettes in 1985 when she became P-31.

In 1982 she served with her sister ships in the Falklands War. On 7 October 1983, during a live fire exercise off Mar del Plata, she sank the old destroyer Almirante Domecq Garcia with a MM38 Exocet missile.

On 1994, from her temporary base at Roosevelt Roads Naval Station, she participated on the blockade of Haiti during Operation Uphold Democracy.

She had also served as support ship of the Buenos Aires-Rio de Janeiro tall ships races.

In 2019, she was reported in reserve and "in the process" of being decommissioned. However, she remained on the navy list until 2024 when it was reported that she would finally be auctioned off.

=== HMS York incident ===
On 25 February 2010 the British tabloid The Sun reported that Drummond had been intercepted and shepherded away by the Royal Navy destroyer HMS York in the vicinity of the Falkland Islands. The story was published in the middle of a diplomatic dispute between the United Kingdom and Argentina about oil drilling, escalating the crisis as the "first head-to-head of the Falklands row". The British Ministry of Defence quickly issued a denial. But a spokesman later said the encounter had occurred a month earlier, before the oil dispute began; both ships were in the same zone in international waters during rough weather at night, and, after a friendly dialogue by radio, each had continued on its own way.
