= Drummond-class corvette =

1978 class of Argentinian corvettes

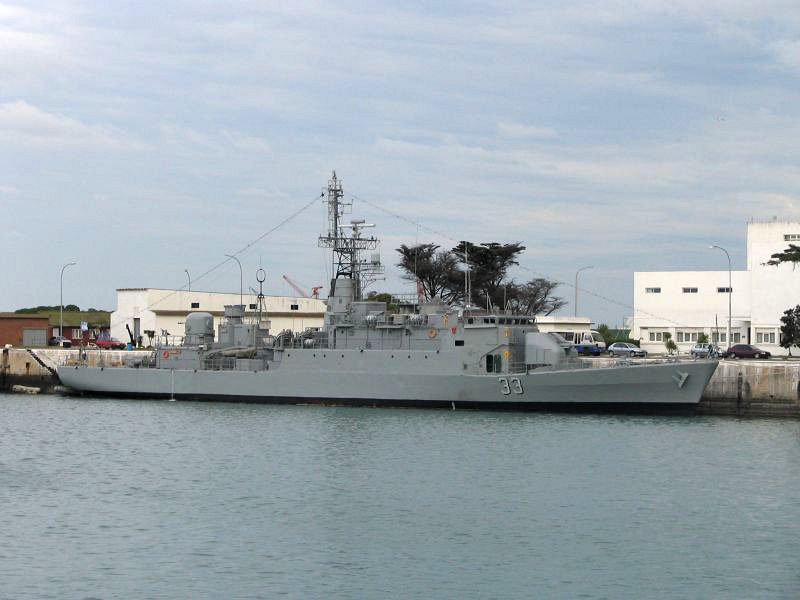
- ARA Granville (P-33) in 2005

Class overview
- Name: Drummond class
- Builders: Arsenal de Lorient
- Operators: Argentine Navy
- In service: 1978
- Completed: 3
- Retired: 3

General characteristics
- Type: Corvette
- Displacement: 1,170 tons (1,320 tons full load)
- Length: 80 m (260 ft)
- Beam: 10.3 m (34 ft)
- Draught: 3.55 m (11.6 ft)
- Installed power: 12,000 shp (8.9 MW)
- Propulsion: 2 × SEMT Pielstick 12 PC 2.2 V400 diesels, 2 × controllable pitch propellers
- Speed: 23.3 knots (43 km/h)
- Range: 4,500 nautical miles (8,330 km) at 16 knots (30 km/h)
- Endurance: 15 days
- Complement: 5 officers, 79 enlisted, 95 berths
- Sensors & processing systems: Thales DRBV 51A air/surface search; Thales DRBC-32E fire control; Consilium Selesmar NavBat; Thales Diodon hull MF sonar
- Electronic warfare & decoys: Thales DR 2000 S3; Thales Alligator 51 jammer; 2 × 18 Corvus decoys (P31/2); 2 × Matra Dagaie decoys (P33)
- Armament: 4 × MM38 Exocet anti-ship missiles; 1 × 100 mm/55 Mod.1968 dual purpose gun; 1 × twin Bofors 40 mm L/70 AA guns; 2 × 20 mm Oerlikon AA guns; 2 × .50cal Colt M2 machine guns; 2 × triple 324 mm ILAS-3 tubes (WASS A-244S torpedoes)
- Aviation facilities: small pad for VERTREP

The Drummond class were three corvettes designed and built in France based on the A69 D'Estienne d'Orves-class avisos. The ships were commissioned in the Argentine Navy between 1978 and 1982.

The ships, when operational, served in the "Atlantic Area of Operations" of the Argentine Navy, based on Mar del Plata Naval Base, province of Buenos Aires. Their mission was to patrol Argentina's exclusive economic zone and to enforce fishing regulations, but according to reports in November 2012 they "hardly sail[ed] because of lack of resources for operational expenses". As of 2020 only Granville, which had been refitted in mid-2019, was reported operational, with the other ships of the class in reserve. In 2024, Granville was retired while the other two vessels of the class were put up for auction.

== Design ==
Although its designers considered the A69 D'Estienne d'Orves class to be avisos, Argentina classified the ships as corvettes.

The Drummond-class ships were equipped mostly with German and Dutch electronic systems (instead of French) for better compatibility with the two MEKO classes in Argentine service, and integrated with the indigenous "Miniaco" combat system.

== History ==
The first two ships of the class were built in 1977 in France for the South African Navy. The sale was embargoed by United Nations Security Council Resolution 418 during sea trials and the ships bought by Argentina instead on 25 September 1978. A third ship was ordered and entered service as ARA Granville on 22 June 1981, in time for the Falklands War the following year. There were minor differences in equipment fit compared to her sisters, for instance Granville had French Dagaie decoys rather than the British Corvus chaff launchers.

On 28 March 1982 Granville and Drummond sailed from Argentina and took up station northeast of Port Stanley to cover the main amphibious landings on 2 April. Meanwhile, ARA Guerrico (P-32) covered the assault on South Georgia, sustaining significant damage from the Royal Marines in the process. After repairs she joined her sister ships north of the Falklands as Task Group 79.4, hoping to catch ships detached from the British task force. On 29 April the corvettes were trailed by the submarine HMS Splendid whilst she was looking for the Argentine aircraft carrier ARA Veinticinco de Mayo.

The Drummond class carried pennant numbers P-1 to P-3 until the introduction of the Espora-class corvettes in 1985 when they became P-31 to P-33. In 1994, they participated in Operation Uphold Democracy, the United Nations blockade of Haiti. During this time, they were based at Roosevelt Roads Naval Station in Puerto Rico.

ARA Granville was reported as active in the South Atlantic following a maintenance period which concluded in 2019. However, in the same year it was also reported that all three Drummond-class vessels could be decommissioned and that consideration was being given to the potential transfer of the ships to the Uruguayan Navy. In 2024 it was reported that both Drummond and Guerrico would be auctioned off while Granville was formally retired at the end of August 2024.

== Ships in the class ==
- ARA Drummond (P-31)
- ARA Guerrico (P-32)
- ARA Granville (P-33)
