= HMS York (D98) =

Destroyer of the Royal Navy

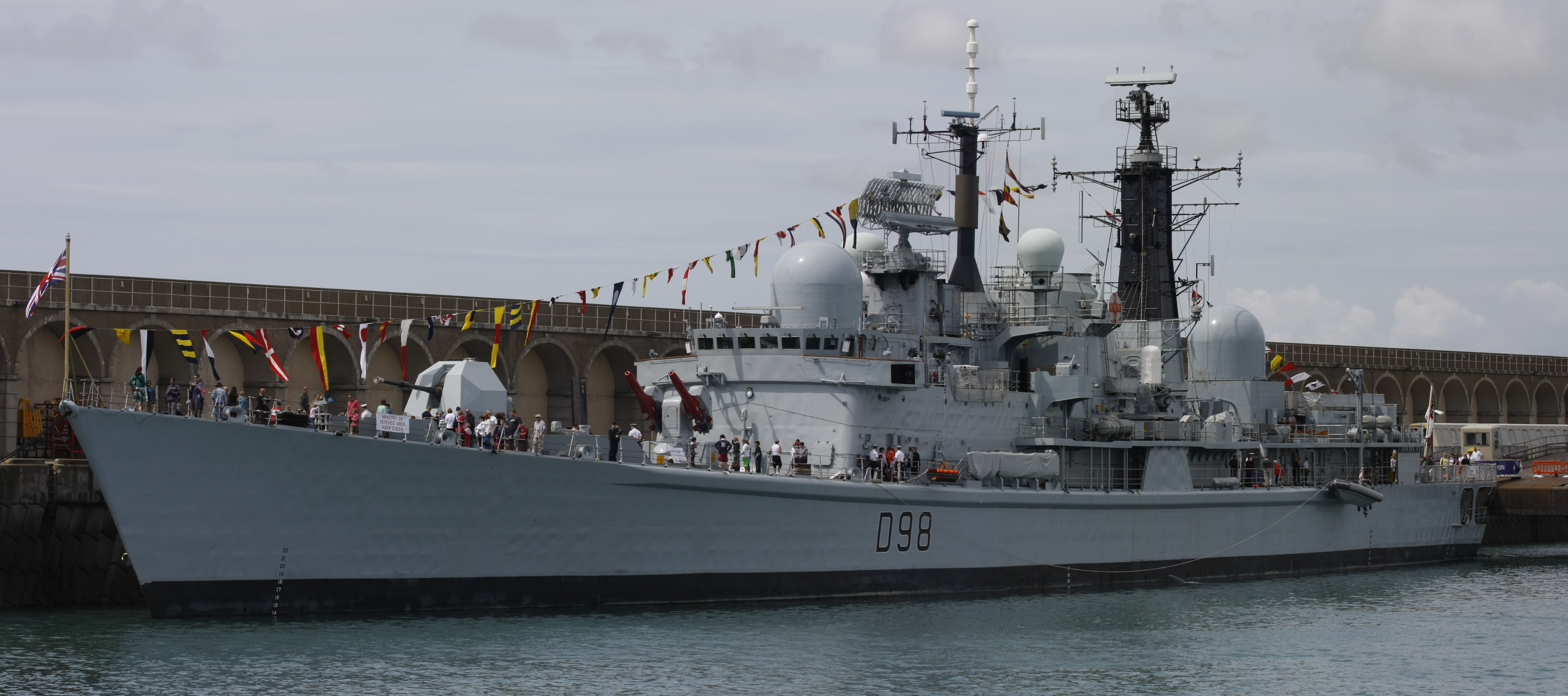
- HMS York in Jersey on 4 May 2009.

History

United Kingdom
- Name: HMS York
- Builder: Swan Hunter, Tyne and Wear
- Laid down: 18 January 1980
- Launched: 20 June 1982
- Sponsored by: Lady Gosling
- Christened: 9 August 1985
- Commissioned: 9 August 1985
- Decommissioned: 27 September 2012
- Identification: Pennant number: D98; Deck code: YK; IMO number: 4907103; MMSI number: 234642000; International callsign: GBBB
- Motto: Bon Espoir ("Good Hope")
- Fate: Scrapped in Turkey 2015
- Badge: On a Field Blue, a White rose with Gold keys issuant Red.

General characteristics
- Class & type: Type 42 destroyer
- Displacement: 5,200 tonnes
- Length: 141 m (463 ft)
- Beam: 15.2 m (50 ft)
- Propulsion: Combined gas or gas turbines, 2 shafts; 2 turbines producing 36 MW (48,000 hp)
- Speed: 34 knots (63 km/h; 39 mph)
- Complement: 287
- Armament: 1 × twin Sea Dart missile launcher (total of 40 missiles); 1 × 4.5 in (110 mm) Mk 8 gun; 2 × 20 mm Oerlikon guns; 2 × Phalanx close-in weapon system (CIWS); 2 × triple anti-submarine torpedo tubes
- Aircraft carried: 1 × Lynx HMA8 armed with: 4 × anti ship missiles; 2 × anti submarine torpedoes

HMS York was a Batch III Type 42-class guided missile destroyer of the Royal Navy. Launched on 20 June 1982 at Wallsend, Tyne and Wear and sponsored by Lady Gosling, York was the last Type 42 ordered. The ship's crest was the White Rose of York, and the "red cross with lions passant" funnel badge was derived from the coat of arms of the City of York. With a maximum speed of 34 knots (63 km/h; 39 mph), she was the Royal Navy's fastest destroyer.

== Operational history ==
=== 1985-1990 ===
1986: Armilla Patrol, then headed East to Hong Kong where she accompanied HMY Britannia as Royal Escort for Queen Elizabeth's visit to China, with the Duke of Edinburgh. In the summer of 1990, HMS York was serving on a routine patrol in the Persian Gulf as part of The Armilla Patrol which had been undertaken by a series of Royal Navy warships over many years. On 2 August that year, Saddam Hussein's forces invaded Kuwait. Instead of heading off to the Far East and Australia for series of "waving the flag" port visits, she remained on patrol in the Persian Gulf for an extra three months. This period was conducted when at sea mostly on a war-ready footing, involving virtually everyone onboard working Defence Watches (basically six hours on, six off) round the clock.

=== 1990-2000 ===
Following refit at Rosyth, York rededicated on 30 June 1995 and then worked up to full readiness undertaking operational sea training and a JMC. She then deployed to the Far East and Middle East with visits to Malaysia, Bangladesh, Oman, UAE, Kuwait, Saudi Arabia and Qatar.

=== 2001-2010 ===
In 2001, she tested a RIM-116 Rolling Airframe Missile.

2002 York deployed early in January in response to the 9-11 bombings. She relieved HMS Southampton which was part of a large exercises in the med and gulf that had been cancelled and diverted to take up station in the Gulf. As Southampton had already been away for several months York sailed and took over so she could return to the UK. Whilst on the deployment the ship visit Salala oman, Dubai, Mumbai India, Gibraltar, Greece and Crete with the ships company enjoying some well earned rest in Kavos on the way home. York arrived back into Portsmouth in June.

In 2003, York took part in the invasion of Iraq providing air cover and area protection for the aircraft carrier HMS Ark Royal. In 2004, she was fitted with the MOD 1 variant of the mark 8 4.5-inch gun. She and Edinburgh were the only two Type 42s to be so fitted.

In July 2006, York joined Gloucester in evacuating British citizens from Beirut in the 2006 Israel-Lebanon conflict making several trips in and out of Lebanon, ferrying evacuees to Cyprus.

In February 2010, York and the auxiliary Wave Ruler were deployed to the Falkland Islands coinciding with a period of increased tensions between the United Kingdom and Argentina over the former's plans to begin drilling for oil in the seas surrounding the islands.

=== 2011-2012 ===
In February 2011, York was deployed to Malta to assist in the evacuation of British nationals from Libya. On 21 April 2011, York arrived at the East Cove Military Port in the Falkland Islands, beginning patrol duties for the islands. On 12 December 2011, York spotted the Admiral Kuznetsov with its carrier group northeast of Orkney, off the coast of northern Scotland, and shadowed the carrier for a week. This was the first time Admiral Kuznetsov had deployed near UK waters and the closest in 20 years that a Russian naval task group had deployed to the UK. She then sailed around the top of Scotland and into the Atlantic past western Ireland, where she conducted flying operations with her Sukhoi Su-33 Flanker jets and Kamov Ka-27 helicopters in international airspace.

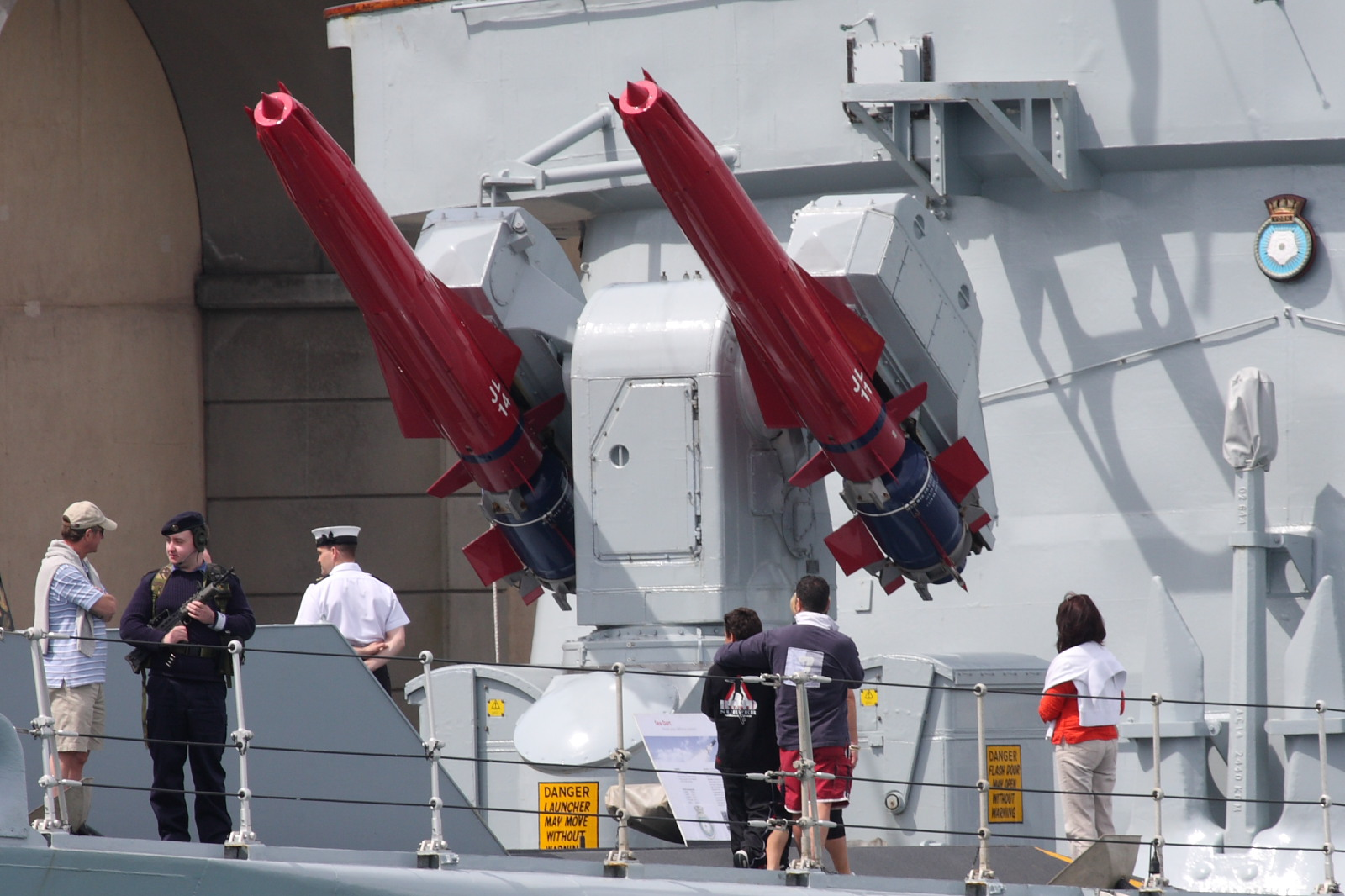
Two drill Sea Dart missiles on York's launcher.

On 13 April 2012, Edinburgh fired the last ever operational Sea Dart missiles after a thirty-year career. As such York completed her career without the system being operational.

York entered Portsmouth Harbour for the final time on 20 September 2012, and was decommissioned on 27 September 2012. In August 2012, the ship was put up for sale. It was scrapped in Turkey in 2015.

== Affiliations ==
- City of York
- The Yorkshire Regiment (14th/15th, 19th and 33rd/76th Foot)
