= ARA Guerrico =

Drummond-class corvette of the Argentine Navy

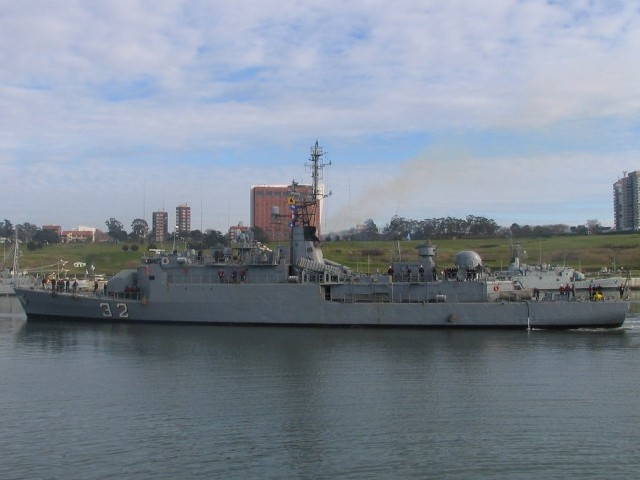
- ARA Guerrico in 2005 at Mar del Plata naval base

History

South Africa
- Ordered: February 1976
- Builder: Lorient, France
- Laid down: 1 October 1976
- Launched: 13 September 1977
- Christened: SAS Transvaal
- Out of service: 17 November 1977
- Fate: Delivery blocked by UNSCR 418 during sea trials in France

Argentina
- Name: ARA Guerrico
- Namesake: Rear Admiral Martín Guerrico
- Commissioned: 1978
- In service: 9 November 1978
- Out of service: 2024
- Home port: Mar del Plata
- Status: To be auctioned off as of 2024

General characteristics
- Class & type: Type A69 Drummond-class corvette
- Displacement: 1,170 tons (1,320 tons full load)
- Length: 80 m (260 ft)
- Beam: 10.3 m (34 ft)
- Draught: 3.55 m (11.6 ft)
- Installed power: 12,000 shp (8.9 MW)
- Propulsion: 2 × SEMT Pielstick 12 PC 2.2 V400 diesels, 2 × controllable pitch propellers
- Speed: 23.3 knots (43 km/h)
- Range: 4,500 nautical miles (8,330 km) at 16 knots (30 km/h)
- Endurance: 15 days
- Complement: 5 officers, 79 enlisted, 95 berths
- Sensors & processing systems: Thales DRBV 51A air/surface search; Thales DRBC-32E fire control; Consilium Selesmar NavBat; Thales Diodon hull MF sonar
- Electronic warfare & decoys: Thales DR 2000 S3; Thales Alligator 51 jammer; 2 × 18 Corvus decoys
- Armament: 4 × MM38 Exocet anti-ship missiles; 1 × 100 mm/55 Mod.1968 dual purpose gun; 1 × twin Bofors 40 mm L/70 AA guns; 2 × 20 mm Oerlikon AA guns; 2 × .50cal Colt M2 machine guns; 2 × triple 324 mm ILAS-3 tubes (WASS A-244S torpedoes)
- Aviation facilities: small pad for VERTREP

ARA Guerrico (P-32) was a Drummond-class corvette of the Argentine Navy. She was the first vessel to be named after Rear Admiral Martín Guerrico who fought in the 19th century Paraguayan War.

She was based at Mar del Plata and conducts fishery patrol duties in the Argentine exclusive economic zone where she has captured several trawlers. According to reports in November 2012 the Drummond class "hardly sail[ed] because of lack of resources for operational expenses". As of 2020, she was reported in reserve and she was finally retired from service in 2024.

== Service history ==
Guerrico was built in 1977 in France for the South African Navy to be named SAS Transvaal but was embargoed at the last minute by United Nations Security Council Resolution 418. She was sold to Argentina instead and delivered on 9 November 1978. She was rushed into service and deployed a month later for the Operation Soberanía against Chile.

In 1982 she served in the Falklands War most notably in the Invasion of South Georgia where she was damaged by Royal Marines weapon fire which led to her spending three days in dry dock for repairs before rejoining the fleet as part of Task Group 79.4, alongside her sister ships operating to the north of the islands. She carried the P-2 pennant number until the introduction of the Espora-class corvettes in 1985 when she became P-32.

In 1994, Guerrico and her sisters participated in Operation Uphold Democracy, the United Nations blockade of Haiti. During this time, she was based at Roosevelt Roads Naval Station in Puerto Rico.

She also served as support ship of the Buenos Aires-Rio de Janeiro tall ships races.

As of 2023, discussions were underway to donate the corvette to the city of Santa Fe as a museum ship. In 2024, it was reported that she would be auctioned off.
