= MV Forrest =

1968 cargo ship

- ARA Forrest

History

United Kingdom
- Name: Forrest
- Namesake: W. Forrest McWahn
- Owner: Falkland Islands Government
- Port of registry: Port Stanley
- Builder: J. W. Cook & Co. Ltd
- Cost: £ 60000
- Yard number: 1349
- Completed: 1968
- Maiden voyage: 1968
- Identification: IMO number: 6717576

Argentina
- Name: ARA Forrest
- Acquired: 1982
- Commissioned: 14 April 1982
- Decommissioned: 14 June 1982
- Notes: taken over by the Argentine Navy

History

Chile
- Name: Forrest
- Commissioned: 1999

General characteristics
- Type: coaster
- Tonnage: 144 GRT
- Length: 77.9 ft (23.7 m)
- Beam: 22 ft (6.7 m)
- Depth: 10.9 ft (3.3 m)
- Decks: 1
- Installed power: 320 NHP
- Propulsion: Kelvin TSM8 4sc sa 8cyl
- Speed: 9 knots (17 km/h)
- Complement: (as ARA Forrest): 17
- Sensors & processing systems: Navigational radar
- Armament: 2 × general purpose machine guns (as ARA Forrest)

MV Forrest (ARA Forrest while in Argentine service) is a small coastal cargo ship owned by the British government of the Falkland Islands from 1968 to 1999, captured by the Argentine Navy on 14 April 1982, in the framework of the Falklands War, and placed under the command of Corvette Captain Rafael G. Molini. Forrest mainly fulfilled logistics tasks, although she was lightly armed with two general-purpose machine guns. The vessel provided tourist services in Chilean Patagonia from 1999 to 2020, when she was laid up.

Forrest belonged to the government of the Falkland Islands and, like the ARA Monsunen and the ARA Penelope (also captured and used by the Argentine Navy), carried out tasks for the Falkland Islands Company, traveling between the different ports of the archipelago.

== Description ==
Forrest was originally assessed at 144 gross register tons (GRT), 47 net register tons (NRT), and 140 tons deadweight (DWT). The ship measured 86 feet 5 inches (26.34 m) long overall, with a breadth of 22 feet (6.7 m) and a depth of 10 feet 9 inches (3.28 m). Its draft was 8 feet (2.4 m). The vessel was powered by a Kelvin TSM8 4sc sa 8-cylinder engine, which produced 320 brake horsepower (240 kW) and allowed it to achieve a speed of 9 knots (17 km/h; 10 mph).

== History ==
=== Early years ===
In 1966 the government of the islands decided to replace the coaster Philomel and requested the construction of a vessel with the necessary characteristics and suitable for the waters of the South Atlantic in the United Kingdom. Forrest was built by J. W. Cook & Co. Ltd of Wivenhoe (yard number 1349), and launched in May 1967. The ship received its name from W. Forrest McWahn, Minister of the Tabernacle of the islands, who served between 1934 and 1965 and had good relations with the Falkland Islanders. She cost about 60,000 pounds sterling.

After a 37-day voyage from England, Forrest arrived in the islands on 8 November 1968, and entered service on 1 December of the same year. Among her duties, she transported cargo between different locations around the islands, distributed fuel to sheep ranches, and moved large quantities of livestock, especially sheep. To perform maintenance work and transport merchandise to the islands, she traveled once a year to Punta Arenas, Chile.

On 2 July 1971 Forrest assisted the Philomel after a fire erupted on board the latter in Stanley Harbour. The old vessel had to be beached on the northern bank of the inlet when the fire grew out of control. Philomel was eventually declared a total loss.

Forrest was often chartered by the Royal Marines' Naval Party 8901 for ferrying troops to different settlements and harbours across the islands for military training. In the course of one of these journeys for military exercises with members of the Falkland Islands Defence Force (FIDF) in North Arm, on 8 August 1980, Royal Marine Alan Addis disappeared without a trace, in what became a famous criminal case in the history of the Falklands.

=== Falklands War ===
==== Argentine Invasion ====
From 31 March to 2 April 1982, the day of the Argentine invasion, Forrest was deployed to the approaches to Port Stanley to operate as a radar picket, commanded by her civilian skipper, Jack Sollis, and two naval officers, Lieutenants Richard Ball and Chris Todhunter. On 1 April Forrest was spotted by the Argentine submarine ARA Santa Fe by periscope. The behavior of the small vessel convinced the Argentine intelligence that the British were aware of the impending landing.

Following a close radar watch on three ships of the Argentine force during the night of 1/2 April near Maguera Point, Sollis moored the vessel at the Falkland Islands government's dock. Under pressure from the Argentine assailants, a section of Royal Marines, led by Corporal David Carr, who had been deployed at Murray Heights, south of Port Stanley, entrenched themselves aboard Forrest after a failed attempt to convince the skipper to sail away. A short time after the surrender of Government house, Carr's marines, still aboard Forrest, laid down their weapons to a party of Argentine naval commandos in the presence of Royal Marine Major Gareth Noot and Corvette Captain Roberto Roscoe, the official translator and one of the leaders of the Argentine expedition. Roscoe and Noot rounded up in the same way all the Royal Marine platoons still resisting, exception made of one who remained at large until 4 April.

Although the Argentine flag was raised over Forrest and Monsunen on 2 April, the ship was not formally requisitioned by the Argentine Navy until 14 April; Corvette Captain Rafael Molini was appointed commander, and the ship was manned by a crew of 17. Its original red paint was changed to black to disguise its presence.

==== ARA Forrest ====
Among her duties in Argentine service, she performed logistical tasks, towed other vessels, patrolled maritime spaces, lighted large vessels, rescued shipwrecked sailors, toured the Argentine military bases in the archipelago and transported supplies to Goose Green. She also engaged in combat against a British helicopter gunship and assisted in mine-laying operations in the waters surrounding Port Stanley. The ship helped locate the position of the explosive devices and acted as an acoustic curtain for British torpedoes. On 29 April, she traveled to Pebble Island together with the Naval Prefecture patrol boat Islas Malvinas, facing the difficult crossing of the Tamar Pass, in order to resupply the Argentine Navy's air base at that island.

While on radar watch and waiting to enter the roadstead of Port Stanley on 1 May, Forrest participated in the first air-sea action of the war. The ship was anchored at Kidney Cove, along with the patrol boat. In the afternoon, a British Lynx helicopter operating from the frigate HMS Alacrity attacked the ship at a distance of 400 meters (1,300 ft), causing minor damage to the port side. The captain ordered the crew to engage the threat with their 13 FAL automatic rifles and a few handguns. When the helicopter approached to within a hundred meters, the crew of Forrest opened fire. The damaged helicopter withdrew towards Berkeley Sound and, after being pursued, fled towards the British fleet to be refueled.

From 5 to 10 May, she sailed through the Falklands Sound, offloading the large merchant Rio Carcarañá and the fleet transport ARA Bahía Buen Suceso at King Cove and Fox Bay, and moving their cargo to Port Howard. On the night of 10 May, while anchored in Port Howard, the vessel received a distress signal from the transport ARA Isla de los Estados, which had been shelled and sunk by HMS Alacrity. Forrest then departed, only to be ordered back to port after being lit up by two star shells across her bow. At dawn, the coaster led a search and rescue mission, saving two of the 24 crew members of the cargo ship on Swan Island.

On 20 May Forrest was fitted with two battery-powered 7.62 mm machine guns dismounted from Pucará aircraft.

On 23 May, Forrest was ordered to rescue her fellow supply ship ARA Monsunen, which had been run aground by her crew in order to evade the attack of the British frigates HMS Yarmouth and HMS Brilliant when these tried to seize the small vessel west of Lively Island. Forrest towed the disabled ship to Goose Green and offload her cargo of fuel drums and flour, eventually reaching Port Stanley on 25 May. From 28 May until the end of the war in June, Forrest patrolled the sea lanes leading to the island's capital. She also performed transport and pilotage duties. On 16 June, after the surrender of the Argentine garrison in Port Stanley, a platoon of British paratroopers took control of the ship, while her Argentine complement was evacuated to the continent aboard ARA Almirante Irízar. The British flags used by Forrest before the Argentine invasion and the Argentine war flag waved during the conflict are held by Rafael Molini as of 2025.

=== Postwar ===
From July 1982 to 1997, Forrest continued its service as a transport and supply vessel to various parts of the islands with the Falkland Islands Company. After 29 years of service, the company decommissioned it. In 1999, it was acquired by the Chilean company Marítima Transaustral Ltda. to carry out work in the Magallanes Region and Chilean Antarctica. After an investment, the company transformed it into a tourist vessel in 2003. Since 1 October 2007, the vessel has been providing tourist cruise services in the fjords and channels of Chilean Patagonia. In 2020 Forrest was laid up as a result of travel restrictions due to the COVID-19 pandemic and brought ashore in 2023.

== See also ==
- ARA Penelope
- Battle of Seal Cove
