= PNS Khaibar (D-183) =

Decommissioned Tariq-class destroyer of the Pakistan Navy

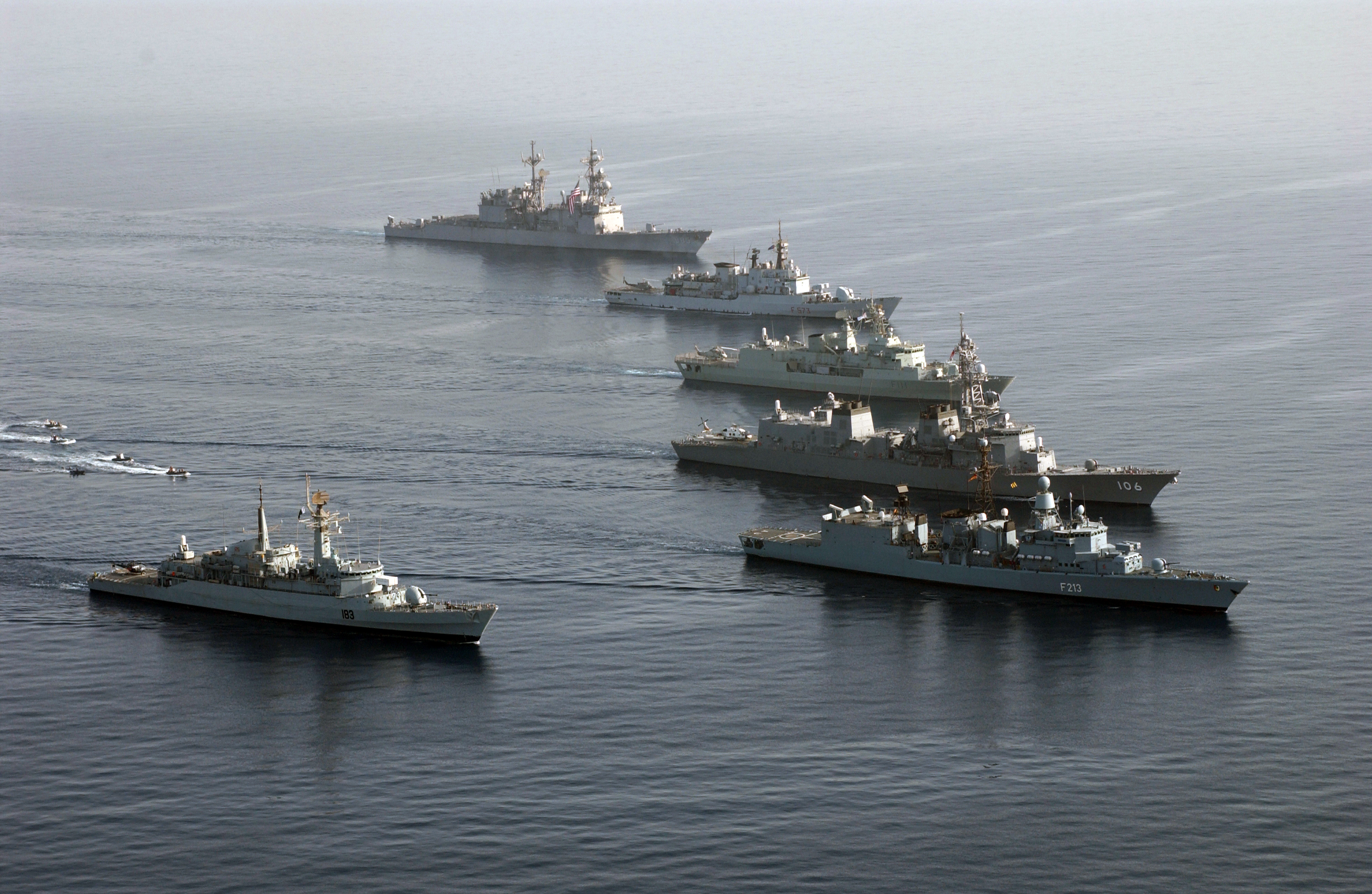
- PNS Khaibar (DDG-183) (first vessel on bottom on the left) assemble in a formation led by the German frigate Augsburg participating in the Combined Task Force-150 in the Indian Ocean in 2004.

History

Pakistan
- Name: PNS Khaibar
- Namesake: Battle of Khaybar
- Builder: Yarrow Shipbuilders in Scotland
- Laid down: 4 December 1971
- Launched: 5 February 1974
- Acquired: 1 March 1994
- Recommissioned: 26 June 1994
- Home port: Naval Base Karachi
- Identification: Pennant number: DDG-183
- Fate: Sunk as a target during SEASPARK-2022 naval exercise.

General characteristics
- Class & type: Tariq-class frigate
- Displacement: 3,700 long tons (3,759 t) full load
- Beam: 41 ft 9 in (12.73 m)
- Draught: 19 ft 6 in (5.94 m)
- Decks: 09
- Propulsion: COGOG: 2 × Rolls-Royce Olympus gas turbines; 2 × Rolls-Royce Tyne RM1A gas turbines for cruising
- Speed: 32 knots (59 km/h; 37 mph)
- Range: 4,000 nautical miles (7,400 km; 4,600 mi) at 17 knots (31 km/h; 20 mph)
- Complement: 192, 14 officers, 178 enlisted
- Armament: 1 × Vickers 4.5 in (114 mm)/55 Mk.8 AS/AA gun (25rds/min to 22 km/11.9nmi); 1 × Phalanx CIWS; 1 × 6-cell LY-60N SAM launcher; 2 × 20 mm Oerlikon cannon
- Aircraft carried: 1 × super Lynx helicopter; 1 × Camcopter S-100 UAV
- Aviation facilities: Flight deck and hangar

PNS Khaibar (DDG-183) was a Tariq-class destroyer of the Pakistan Navy between 1994 and 2022.

Prior to be commissioned in the service of the Pakistan Navy in 1994, she served in the Royal Navy, formerly designated as HMS Arrow as a general purpose frigate. The modernization and midlife upgrade program by the KSEW Ltd. at the Naval Base Karachi reclassified her status as guided missile destroyer.

== Service history ==
=== Acquisition, construction, and modernization ===
Designed and constructed by the Yarrow Shipbuilders, Ltd. at Glasgow in Scotland, she was laid down on 28 September 1972, and was launched on 5 February 1974. She commissioned on 29 July 1976 in the Surface Fleet of the Royal Navy as HMS Arrow. During her service with the Royal Navy, she was notable for her wartime operations during the Falklands War with Argentina.

On 1 March 1994, she was purchased by Pakistan after the successful negotiation with the United Kingdom and sailed from the Port of Plymouth to the Port of Karachi, arriving on 26 June 1994.

Upon arriving in Karachi, she underwent an extensive modernization and a mid-life upgrade program by the KSEW Ltd. at the Naval Base Karachi in 1998–2002.

She was named after the battle of Khaybar in Medina in the year 628, and was commissioned on 1 March 1994.

Her wartime performance included in deployments in patrolling off the Gulf of Aden, Gulf of Oman, Persian Gulf, Arabian Sea as well as deploying in the Mediterranean Sea when she was part of the multinational CTF-150.

== Gallery ==
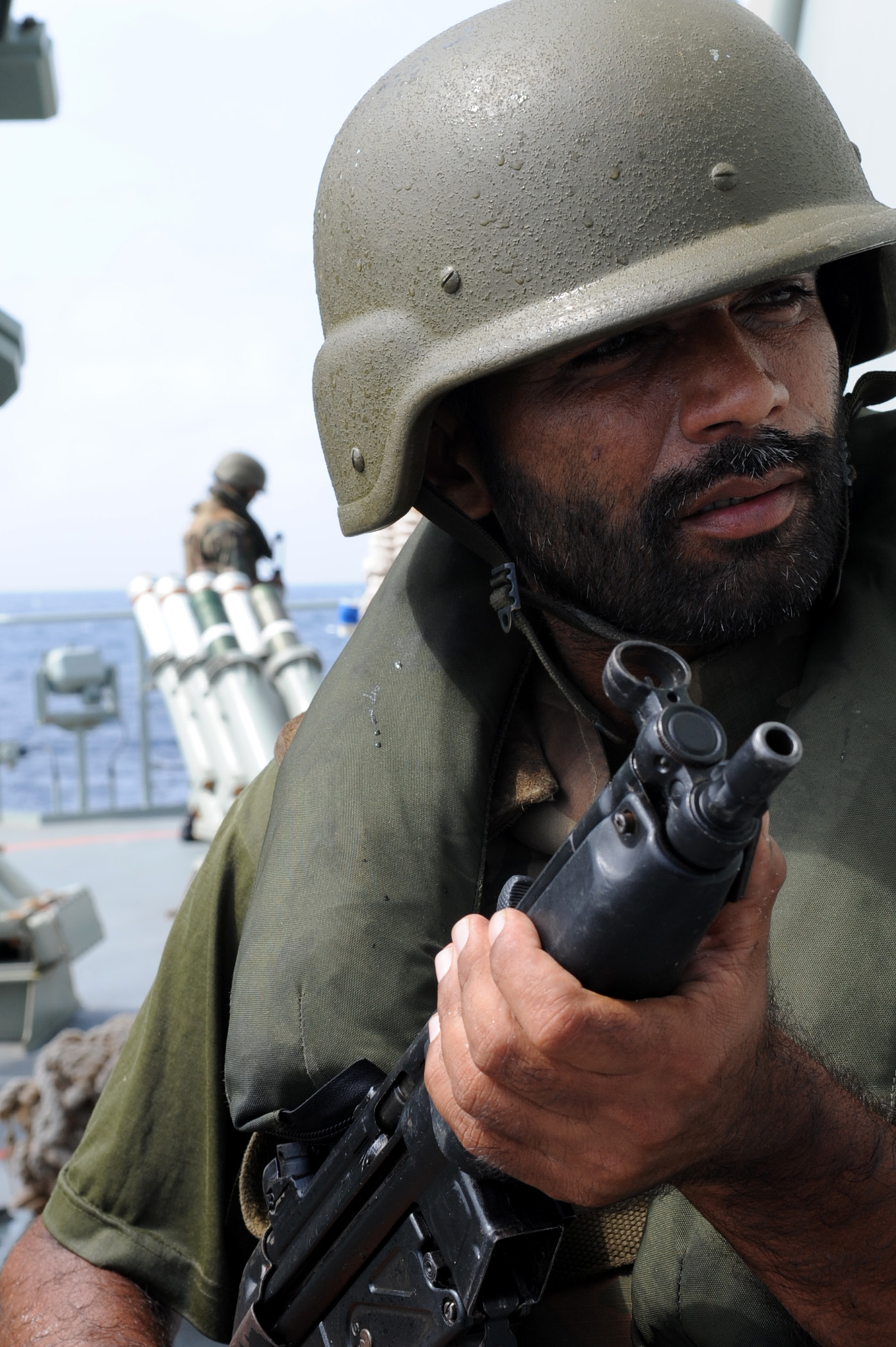
A Navy's VBSS Team member of the SSG(N) stands in security aboard PNS Khaibar during the VBSS drill with British Special Boat Service in 2009.

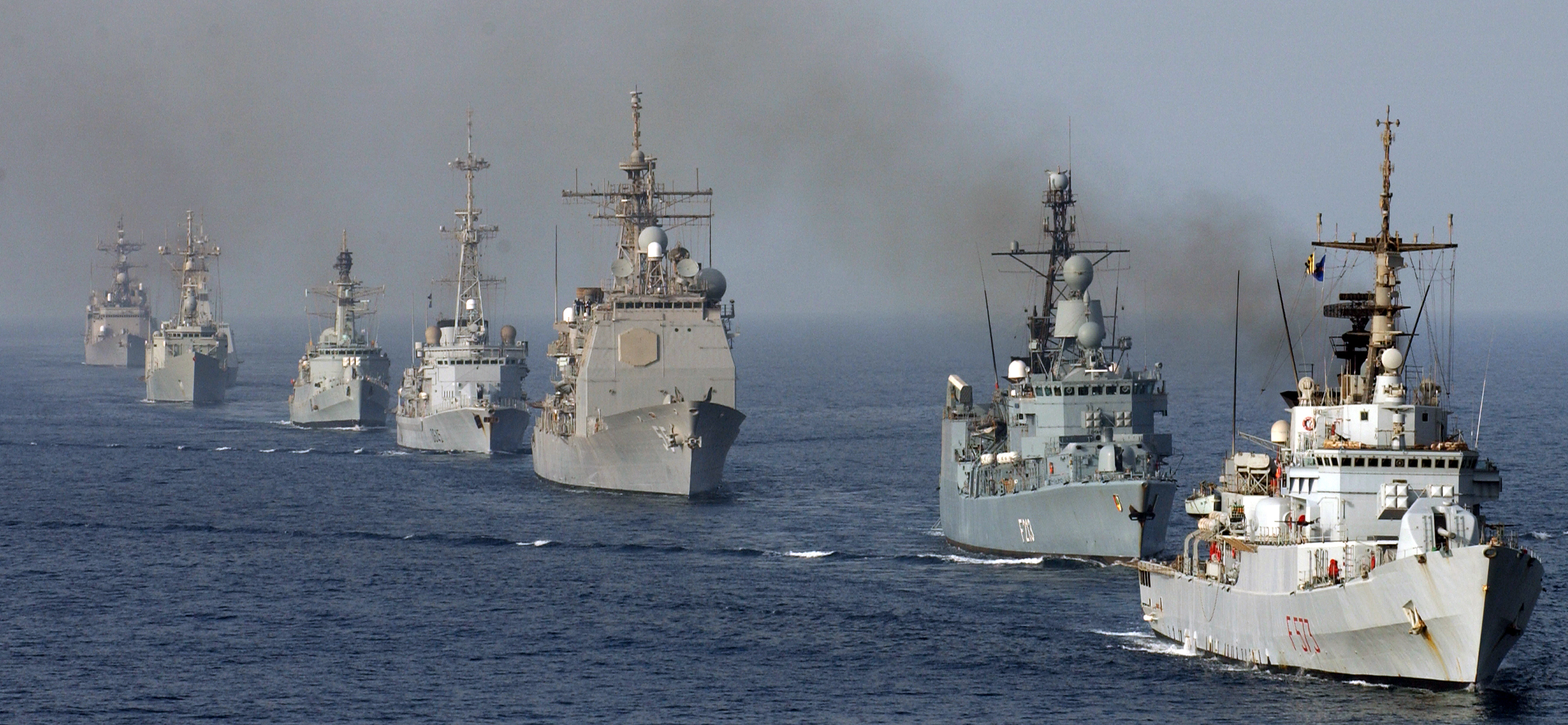
PNS Khaibar (Fifth vessel on the left), in a formation of assigned to Combined Task Force 150 led by Italian Scirocco in the Indian Ocean in 2006.

== Media files ==
- "PNS KHAIBAR and PNS NASR visiting Mauritius". YouTube. 14 January 2018.
