= Battle of Seal Cove =

Naval action during the 1982 Falklands War

- Part of Falklands War
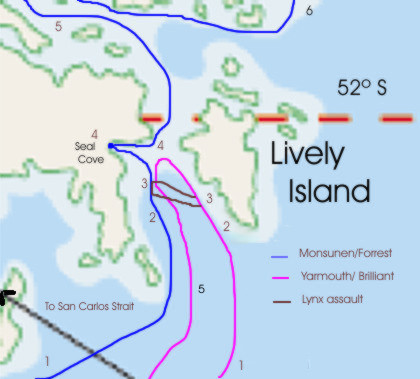
- Sketch depicting the chase of the Argentine coastal vessel Monsunen by British frigates Details: # The coastal ship ARA Monsunen, after sailing out from Fox bay, is tracked by the British frigates HMS Brilliant and HMS Yarmouth under orders of capturing her.; # The British force pin up the supply vessel off Lively island; # The Brilliant Sea Lynx helicopter, with SBS troops onboard, is forced to withdraw under heavy machine gun fire.; # The Monsunen radar detects the two frigates about 8 miles behind her and approaching at high speed. The warships start to shell the small vessel, which evades the British salvos by running aground on Seal Cove, blinding the British radar; # After further shelling, the British abandoned the pursuit, making back to San Carlos. ARA Monsunen is rescued by another coastal ship, ARA Forrest, and taken in tow to Darwin.; # After uploading Monsunens cargo, Forrest managed to reach Port Stanley on 25 May.
Date	23 May 1982
Location	West of Lively Island, Falkland Islands 52°2′57″S 58°34′5″W
Result	Argentine victory

Belligerents
United Kingdom	Argentina

Commanders and leaders
Captain Anthony Morton (HMS Yarmouth); Captain John Coward (HMS Brilliant)	Captain Jorge A. Gopcevich-Canevari (ARA Monsunen)

Strength
1 Type 22 frigate 1 Rothesay-class frigate	1 armed coastal ship

Casualties and losses
None	1 coastal ship beached (later taken in tow and rescued by ARA Forrest)
- Location within Falkland Islands

The Battle of Seal Cove was a minor naval action fought west of Lively Island, during the 1982 Falklands War. On the evening of 22 May 1982, while supporting Operation Sutton off San Carlos Bay, the British frigates HMS Brilliant and HMS Yarmouth received orders to stop and seize the Argentine Navy armed coastal supply boat ARA Monsunen, which was carrying fuel, ammunition and provisions for the Argentine troops in Stanley. Under heavy shelling, the coaster managed to avoid capture by grounding on a nearby inlet. Monsunen eventually broke free and was towed to Goose Green by the armed coster ARA Forrest, which completed the supply mission.

== Background ==
The ARA Monsunen was a 326 ton Danish-built British coaster vessel owned by the Falklands Islands Company that had been captured in the course of the Argentine invasion. The vessel was armed with a MAG 7.62 mm general-purpose machine gun, another battery-powered 7.62 mm machine gun taken from a Pucará aircraft, plus three FAL rifles and a number of 9 mm pistols. The Monsunen was spotted by an RAF GR.3 Harrier while sailing from Fox Bay towards Port Stanley with a cargo of 150 drums of fuel, 250 sacks of flour and 105 mm ammunition. Her commander, Captain Jorge Gopcevich-Canevari, claims that his ship had evaded the vigilance of two British frigates in the same area while carrying out a similar mission on 17 May.

Commodore Michael Clapp, the commander of the British amphibious assault force, ruled out an airstrike on Monsunen but chose instead to capture the supply vessel. The Type 22 frigate HMS Brilliant and the Rothesay-class HMS Yarmouth were charged with the task. The decision was taken because he suspected there could be islanders on board and the British needed to improve their logistical capabilities. Clapp also hoped to obtain intelligence about Argentine Army positions and minefields.

== The engagement ==
At 4:00 am GMT on 23 May, a Lynx helicopter (serial number XZ721) from HMS Brilliant identified Monsunen while the latter was heading to the north, west of Lively Island. After a surrender order was radioed to the motorboat, another Lynx transporting a Special Boat Service (SBS) team tried to intercept her. The aircraft was engaged by heavy machine gun and small arms fire, so it was forced to abort the mission. At the same time, Monsunen's radar picked up the British squadron about eight miles (13 km) to stern and approaching aggressively. Corvette Lieutenant Oscar Vázquez, Gopcevich's second-in-command, later reported that while Brilliant was closing on them from the south, Yarmouth sailed ahead to Choiseul Sound, blocking the passage from the north.

HMS Yarmouth began to fire her 4.5-inch (114 mm) guns on the Argentine vessel, forcing her to manoeuvre in order to avoid the incoming rounds. When the distance fell to four nautical miles (7.4 km), Gopcevich decided that the only way to deceive the British radar was to beach Monsunen on Seal Cove, a large inlet surrounded by cliffs. According to Vázquez, the reflection of the jagged coastline rendered the frigates' radar incapable of ranging the target.

Shortly after Gopcevich succeeded in running aground his ship close to a shoal and ordered the crew to abandon her, the British shelling resumed. The fire was inaccurate and aimed at the general area of landing. In the process of evacuating the vessel, one of the ratings fell overboard and suffered some serious bruises, but he was successfully rescued by a young conscript sailor, Romualdo Bazán. The crew members took refuge in an improvised inland shelter.

Vázquez reports that the British squadron fired 100 high-explosive and armour-piercing rounds at Monsunen in the course of the action.

The British warships eventually called off a second SBS assault on the grounded Argentine vessel as it was unclear whether troops on board "could have stay behind in ambush".

== Aftermath ==
The British frigates gave up their chase and withdrew from the area before sunrise; Yarmouth, with the SBS detachment aboard, headed to San Carlos waters, while Brilliant joined the carrier group to the east for refuelling. Monsunen was found by her complement at dawn, with her engine still running; apparently after refloating by the rising tide. However, a sling had become entangled with her propeller, disabling the transmission.

With the ship's speed now dramatically reduced, Gopcevich radioed for help to Stanley.

A few hours later, another British coastal supply ship seized by the Argentine Navy, ARA Forrest, towed Monsunen to Darwin. The much needed cargo was uploaded by ARA Forrest, which made for Stanley. The coaster successfully completed Monsunen's relief mission on 25 May. ARA Monsunen was later recovered at Darwin by British forces on 29 May, after the Battle of Goose Green.

Romualdo Bazán, who committed suicide in 2006, was decorated with the Congress Medal of Valour in Combat, while Captain Jorge Gopcevich-Canevari received the Navy's Medal of Valour in Combat.

The action is thought to be the only naval encounter between armed surface ships in the war.

== Gallery ==
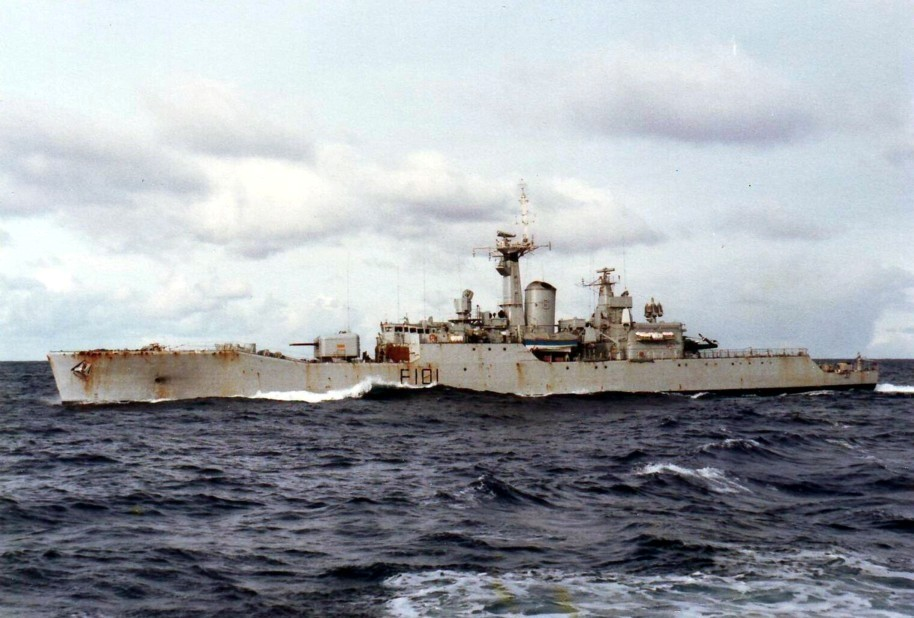
HMS Yarmouth

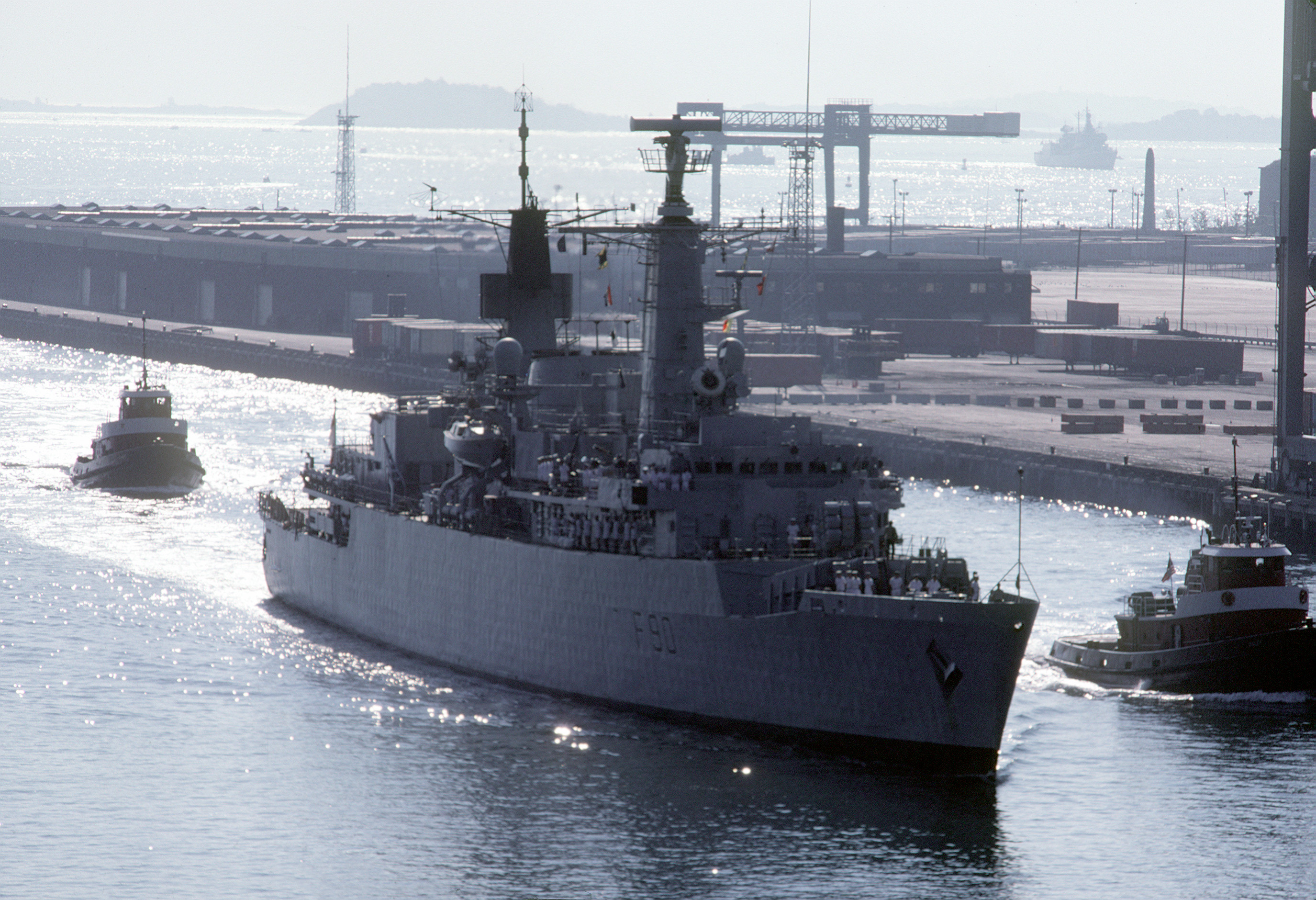
HMS Brillant

ARA Monsunen
