= Type 43 =

Type 43 may refer to:

- Bristol Type 43 Grampus IV, a proposed British biplane passenger aircraft
- Bugatti Type 43, Bugatti automobile
- Type 43 destroyer, a proposed British warship class
