= Anthony Morton =

Royal Navy Admiral (1923–2006)

Admiral Sir Anthony Morton GBE KCB
- Born: 6 November 1923
- Died: 6 May 2006 (aged 82); Winchester, Hampshire
- Military career
- Allegiance: United Kingdom
- Branch: Royal Navy
- Service years: 1941–1984
- Rank: Admiral
- Commands: Vice Chief of the Naval Staff; Vice-Chief of the Defence Staff; First Flotilla; 20th Frigate Squadron; HMS Yarmouth
- Conflicts: Second World War
- Awards: Knight Grand Cross of the Order of the British Empire; Knight Commander of the Order of the Bath

Admiral Sir Anthony Storrs Morton, GBE, KCB (6 November 1923 – 6 May 2006) was a senior Royal Navy officer who served as Vice-Chief of the Defence Staff from 1977 to 1978.

== Naval career ==
Educated at Loretto School, Morton was commissioned into the Royal Navy in 1941 during the Second World War. He became commanding officer of the frigate HMS Yarmouth as well as captain of the 20th Frigate Squadron in 1964, Senior Naval Officer Northern Ireland in 1968 and Senior Naval Member at the Royal College of Defence Studies in 1971. He went on to be Assistant Chief of Defence Staff (Policy) in 1973 and Flag Officer First Flotilla in 1975. He was appointed Vice-Chief of the Defence Staff in 1977 and Vice Chief of the Naval Staff in 1978. Following promotion to full admiral on 6 July 1979, he was in 1980 appointed UK Military Representative to NATO; he retired on 28 January 1984.

In retirement Morton became King of Arms of the Order of the British Empire as well as Rear-Admiral and then Vice-Admiral of the United Kingdom. He died in 2006 after a long illness.

Military offices
Preceded by Sir Henry Leach	Vice-Chief of the Defence Staff; 1977–1978	Succeeded by Sir Edwin Bramall
Preceded by Sir Raymond Lygo	Vice Chief of the Naval Staff; 1978–1980	Succeeded by Sir William Staveley
Preceded by Sir Alasdair Steedman	UK Military Representative to NATO; 1980–1983	Succeeded by Sir Thomas Morony
Heraldic offices
Preceded by Sir George Gordon-Lennox	King of Arms of the Order of the British Empire; 1983–1997	Succeeded by Sir Patrick Hine
Honorary titles
Preceded by Sir Anthony Griffin	Rear-Admiral of the United Kingdom; October – November 1988	Succeeded by Sir James Eberle
Preceded by Sir Anthony Griffin	Vice-Admiral of the United Kingdom; 1988–1994	Succeeded by Sir James Eberle
