= Nick Barker (Royal Navy officer) =

English naval officer (1933–1997)

Captain Nick Barker CBE FRGS
- Born: Nicholas John Barker; 19 May 1933; Sliema, British Malta
- Died: 7 April 1997 (aged 63); Low Farnham, Northumberland, England
- Military career
- Allegiance: United Kingdom
- Branch: Royal Navy
- Service years: 1951–1988
- Rank: Captain
- Commands: HMS Brereton (M1113); HMS Jupiter (F60); HMS Nubian (F131); HMS Arrow (F173); HMS Sheffield (F96); HMS Endurance (1967)
- Wars: Falklands War
- Awards: Commander of the Order of the British Empire (1982)

Nicholas John Barker CBE FRGS (19 May 1933 – 7 April 1997) was an English senior Royal Navy officer and commanding officer of the survey ship HMS Endurance during the Falklands War.

== Career ==
Barker served in the Royal Navy between 1951 and 1988. Besides Endurance, he held the following commands: HMS Brereton, HMS Jupiter, HMS Nubian, HMS Arrow and HMS Sheffield. He was also commander of the Fishery Protection Squadron between 1984 and 1986.

While permanently stationed in the South Atlantic, he warned the British Ministry of Defence of increased activity of the Argentine forces and the potential of an invasion of the Falkland Islands.

Barker believed that Defence Secretary John Nott's 1981 Defence White Paper (in which Nott described plans to withdraw the Endurance, the UK's only naval presence in the South Atlantic) had sent a signal to the Argentines that the UK was unwilling, and would soon be unable, to defend its territories and subjects in the Falklands.

Despite Barker's messages, the United Kingdom took no action and Prime Minister Margaret Thatcher claimed there had been no warning.

Barker's warnings were dismissed in Whitehall as an attempt to save the Endurance, which was due to be paid off as part of defence cuts. The conflict he had tried to forewarn would later be called the Falklands War. Barker was made a Commander of the Order of the British Empire in October 1982 for his actions during the war.

== Publications ==
- Beyond Endurance: An Epic of Whitehall and the South Atlantic Conflict. London: Leo Cooper. 2002. ISBN 9780850528794.

== See also ==
- Events leading to the Falklands War
