= Gerard Mansfield =

Royal Navy Vice-Admiral (1921-2006)

Vice-Admiral Sir Gerard Mansfield KBE CVO
- Born: 13 July 1921
- Died: 27 June 2006 (aged 84); Odiham
- Military career
- Allegiance: United Kingdom
- Branch: Royal Navy
- Service years: 1935–1975
- Rank: Vice-Admiral
- Nickname: Ged
- Commands: HMS Mounts Bay
- Conflicts: World War II
- Awards: Knight Commander of the Order of the British Empire; Commander of the Royal Victorian Order

Vice-Admiral Sir Edward Gerard "Ged" Napier Mansfield KBE CVO (13 July 1921 – 27 June 2006) was Deputy Supreme Allied Commander, Atlantic. After leaving the Royal Navy became a fund-raiser for the Queen's Silver Jubilee Trust.

== Early life ==
Edward Gerard Napier Mansfield was the son of Vice-Admiral Sir Jack Mansfield, KCB, DSO, DSC, and a descendant of the 19th-century Admiral Sir Charles "Black" Napier.

== Education ==
He was educated at Durnford School an independent school near Swanage, Dorset, before going to Royal Naval College, Dartmouth in 1935.

== War service in the Royal Navy ==
In May 1939 Midshipman Mansfield joined the destroyer HMS Wrestler and then the heavy cruiser HMS Sussex at Alexandria. At the start of the war, Sussex joined Force H hunting for the German pocket battleship Admiral Graf Spee in the South Atlantic. He then escorted the first troop convoy from Australia and New Zealand across the Indian Ocean, and took part in the campaign against Italian Somaliland.

He spent a short period in the battlecruiser HMS Repulse followed by professional courses at Portsmouth during the Blitz - "not conducive to diligent study," he recalled. Promoted to sub-lieutenant, he first served in the J-class destroyer HMS Jupiter in the North Sea and Mediterranean. On 26 March 1942 he was in HMS Jaguar when she was hit by two torpedoes from the submarine U-652, catching fire and sinking quickly. Three officers and 190 ratings were lost, and Mansfield, though wounded in the head, was one of 53 men rescued. He telegraphed his mother: "March passed, with major wetting."

He joined combined operations, and was mentioned in dispatches for his work as a beachmaster during the landings in North Africa and Sicily. He then became first lieutenant of a submarine, but this proved to be a dead-end in his career as he was diagnosed with tuberculosis. He returned to good health and rose rapidly in his career. He became commanding officer of the frigate HMS Mounts Bay in 1956 and went on to become commanding officer of the frigate HMS Yarmouth as well as captain of the 20th Frigate Squadron in 1963. He was appointed Commodore, Amphibious Forces, Far East Fleet from July 1967 to November 1968. He was next appointed Flag Officer Sea Training from March 1971 to October 1972, during which he was promoted to vice admiral on 1 August 1972. Appointed Deputy Supreme Allied Commander Atlantic, based at Norfolk, Virginia in 1973. He retired in 1975.

== Personal life ==
He married, in 1943, Joan Worship Byron, twin daughter of Commander John Byron (1891–1944), RNVR, DSC and Bar, and Frances (née Worship). Joan survived him with their two daughters, one of whom is Didy Grahame, until recently Secretary of the Victoria Cross and George Cross Association. Lady Mansfield died in 2020.

Military offices
Preceded by Anthony Troup	Flag Officer Sea Training; 1971–1972	Succeeded by John Roberts
Preceded by Sir John Martin	Deputy Supreme Allied Commander Atlantic; 1973–1975	Succeeded by Sir James Jungius
