= Type system of the Royal Navy =

Classification of surface escorts

The Type system is a classification system used by the British Royal Navy to classify surface escorts by function. The system evolved in the early 1950s, when the Royal Navy was experimenting with building single-purpose escort vessels with specific roles in light of experience gained in World War II. The original (July 1950) numbering scheme was:

Type 1X were Anti-Submarine (ASW) frigates (when the numbers ran out in the 1960s, ASW frigates continued as the Type 2X series).

Type 3X were General-Purpose (GP) frigates (Chosen 2015)
Type 4X were Anti-Aircraft (AAW) frigates (this later evolved into the "Destroyer" Type series).
Type 6X were Aircraft-Direction (ADW) frigates.
Type 8X were multi-role ships. An Admiralty Fleet Order defined these ships as "destroyers" if they could achieve "fleet speed" or as "sloops" if they could not.

== Types 11-30, anti-submarine frigates ==
- Type 11 : Diesel powered anti-submarine frigate based on hull of Type 41 / 61. Not built.
- Type 12 Whitby class : Steam powered, high-speed "first-rate" anti-submarine frigate.
- Type 12M Rothesay class: Modified Type 12 design.
- Type 12I Leander class : Improved Type 12, general purpose frigate. Also produced as the Condell class, River class, Nilgiri class and Van Speijk class for other navies
- Type 14 Blackwood class : Steam powered, high-speed, "second-rate" anti-submarine frigate.
- Type 15 class : High-speed anti submarine frigate, produced by full conversion of wartime built destroyers of the R-, T-, U- and V- and W and Z-classes.
- Type 16 class : High-speed anti submarine frigate, produced by a limited conversion of wartime T-class (7 ships), O- and P-class (3) destroyers.
- Type 17 : "Third-rate" anti-submarine frigate, analogous to wartime corvettes. Design abandoned in 1953 and not built.
- Type 18 : High-speed anti submarine frigate, intermediate conversion of wartime destroyer hulls of the N-, S-, T and Z- classes (and intended to replace the Type 16). Design abandoned in 1953 and not built.
- Type 19 : Very high speed (42 knot) gas turbine powered anti-submarine frigate. Design abandoned in 1965. Not built.
- Type 21 class Amazon-class: General purpose, gas-turbine powered commercially designed frigate.
- Type 22 class Broadsword-class : Large, gas-turbine powered, anti-submarine frigates.
- Type 23 class Duke-class : Gas-turbine and diesel powered, anti-submarine frigates. Smaller and less expensive than the Type 22, with similar capabilities. 16 built.
- Type 24 : Cheap frigate design ("Future Light Frigate") intended for export. In RN service would have served as a towed array ASW ship. Not built.
- Type 25 : More capable development of the Type 24, designed to have almost the capability of a Type 22 but at only three-quarters of the cost. Much of the thinking, including the diesel-electric machinery, went into the Type 23. Not built.
- Type 26 class : "Global Combat Ship" : First announced in March 2010, and formerly known as the Future Surface Combatant. Initial orders placed in February 2014.

== Types 31-40, general purpose frigates ==
- Type 31-class frigate : a General Purpose frigate as set out in the Strategic Defence and Security Review 2015.
- Type 32-class frigate announced in November 2020.

== Types 41-60, anti-aircraft frigates/destroyers ==
- Type 41 Leopard class : Diesel powered anti-aircraft frigate built on common hull with Type 61.
- Type 42(i) East coast frigate : High speed coastal escort. Not built
- Type 42 class (ii) Sheffield-class : Gas-turbine powered, fleet area-defence anti-aircraft destroyer.
- Type 43 class : Large gas-turbine powered, "double-ended" (Sea Dart launchers fore and aft), fleet area-defence anti-aircraft destroyer. Project cancelled in 1981 with none built.
- Type 44 destroyer : A smaller version of the Type 43 with better anti-submarine capability. Cancelled.
- Type 45 destroyer Daring-class : Fleet area-defence anti-aircraft destroyer to replace Type 44 project. 6 built.

== Types 61-80, aircraft direction frigates ==
- Type 61 Salisbury-class : Diesel powered aircraft-direction frigate built on common hull with Type 41.
- Type 62 : Proposed high-speed aircraft-direction frigate, to be built by full conversion of five remaining ships of the M-class destroyers and seven War Emergency Programme destroyers. Not built.

== Types 81-99, general purpose frigates/destroyers/sloops ==
- Type 81 Tribal-class frigate : Single-shaft steam / gas-turbine powered general purpose "colonial" frigates. Originally sloops reclassified as "second class" general-purpose frigates in 1960s.
- Type 82 destroyer : Large steam / gas-turbine powered fleet anti-aircraft and anti-submarine destroyer to replace County-class destroyers and escort CVA-01 aircraft carriers. Cancelled along with carriers. Only HMS Bristol (D23) was built of the four planned.
- Type 83: proposed in the 2021 Defence Command Paper as the successor to the Type 45 Destroyer entering service in the late 2030s.
- Type 91 Arsenal Ship : An Arsenal Ship planned to complement the firepower of the Type 83.
- Type 92 Sloop : An ASW uncrewed surface vessel planned under Project Chariot
- Type 93 Chariot : An extra large UUV

== See also ==
- Naming conventions for destroyers of the Royal Navy - describing the various conventions used to name destroyer classes of the Royal Navy since 1913.
- Rating system of the Royal Navy - the system used to classify ships of the line during the age of sail. The "rating" system was briefly revived to further classify anti-submarine escorts during the 1950s.
