= HMS Endurance (1967) =

Royal Navy vessel

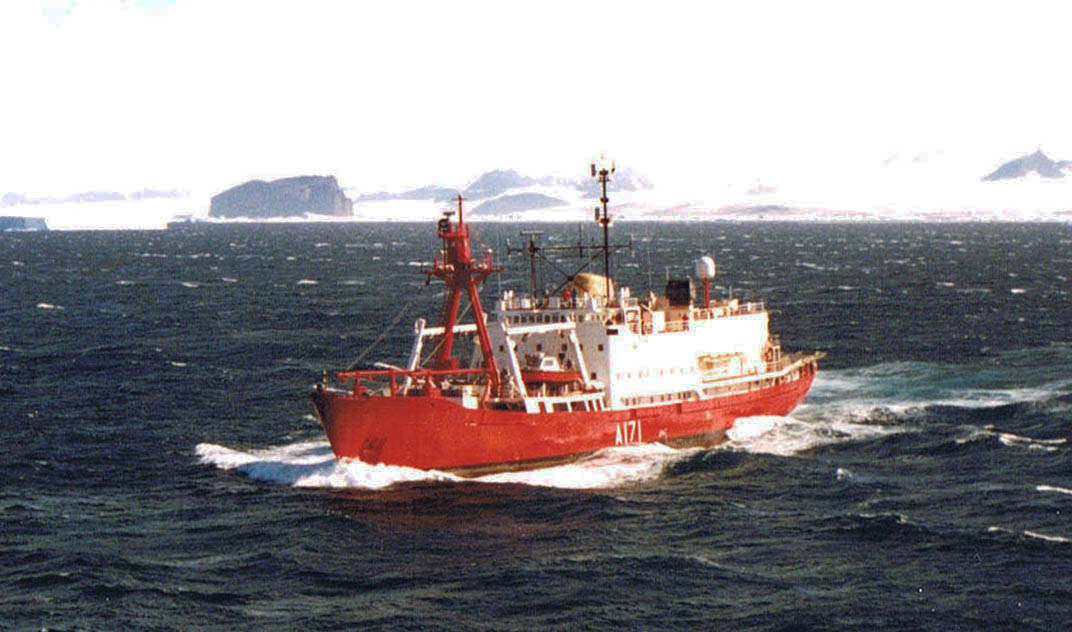
- HMS Endurance (formerly Anita Dan)

History

Denmark
- Name: Anita Dan
- Owner: Lauritzen Lines
- Builder: Kröger-Werft, Schacht-Audorf
- Yard number: 1080
- Launched: 26 May 1956
- In service: October 1956
- Fate: Sold to the Royal Navy, 1967

United Kingdom
- Name: Endurance
- Acquired: 1967
- Out of service: 1991
- Home port: Chatham and Portsmouth
- Identification: IMO number: 5017967
- Nickname(s): The Red Plum; HMS Encumbrance
- Fate: Scrapped

General characteristics
- Type: Icebreaker
- Displacement: 3,600 long tons (3,658 t)
- Length: 93 m (305 ft)
- Beam: 14 m (46 ft)
- Draught: 5.5 m (18 ft)
- Propulsion: 1 × Burmeister & Wain diesel engine
- Speed: 14.5 knots (26.9 km/h; 16.7 mph)
- Complement: 119
- Armament: 2 × Oerlikon 20 mm cannon
- Aircraft carried: 1967–87: 2 × Westland Wasp helicopters; 1982: Westland Wessex helicopter; 1987–91: 2 × Westland Lynx helicopters (after 1987 refit)

Service record
- Operations: Falklands War

HMS Endurance was a Royal Navy ice patrol vessel that served from 1967 to 1991. She came to public notice when she was involved in the Falklands War of 1982. The final surrender of the war, in the South Sandwich Islands, took place aboard Endurance.

== Background ==
The ship was built and launched in 1956 by Kröger-Werft of Germany as Anita Dan for the Lauritzen Lines. In 1967 the UK government purchased the vessel and then had Harland & Wolff carry out the conversion prior to being commissioned into the Royal Navy as HMS Endurance, named after the sailing ship Endurance that took the explorer Ernest Shackleton's expedition to the Antarctic in 1914.

== Operational history ==
=== 1967–1982 ===
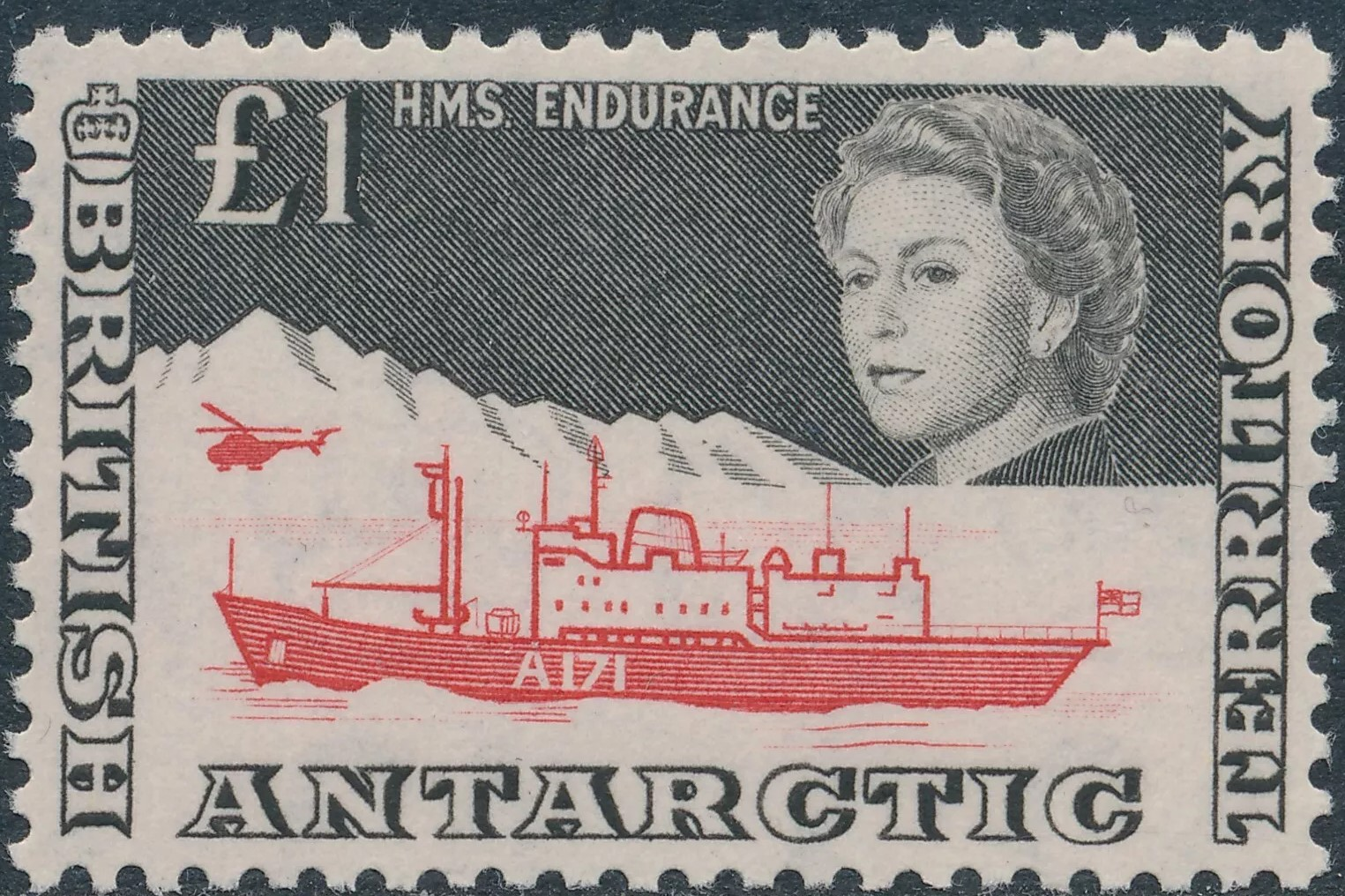
Endurance featured on a 1969 British Antarctic Territory stamp

The new Endurance maintained a UK presence in Antarctica and the Falkland Islands during the southern summer. She also supported the British Antarctic Survey. She had a bright red hull, as is common for polar vessels to aid visibility but otherwise uncommon for the Royal Navy, so her crew nicknamed her The Red Plum. In February 1972 when the cruise ship Lindblad Explorer ran aground, Endurance was in the vicinity under Captain Rodney Bowden and took part in the rescue.

Endurance was equipped with a signals listening suite on top of the hangar, and was staffed with Spanish linguists to monitor radio communications and collect signals intelligence off South America. The data was processed by GCHQ, and in the 1970s underlay much of GCHQ's South America analysis. Endurance's captain later stated "It could be argued that the main armament of the ship was the listening suite."

The Ministry of Defence's 1981 Defence White Paper proposed naval cuts including decommissioning Endurance, which was scheduled for 15 April 1982.

=== Falklands War ===
Endurance's withdrawal from Antarctic patrol without replacement was perceived in Britain as having encouraged the Argentine invasion. The subsequent Franks Report acknowledged that it "may have served to cast doubt on British commitment to the Islands and their defence".

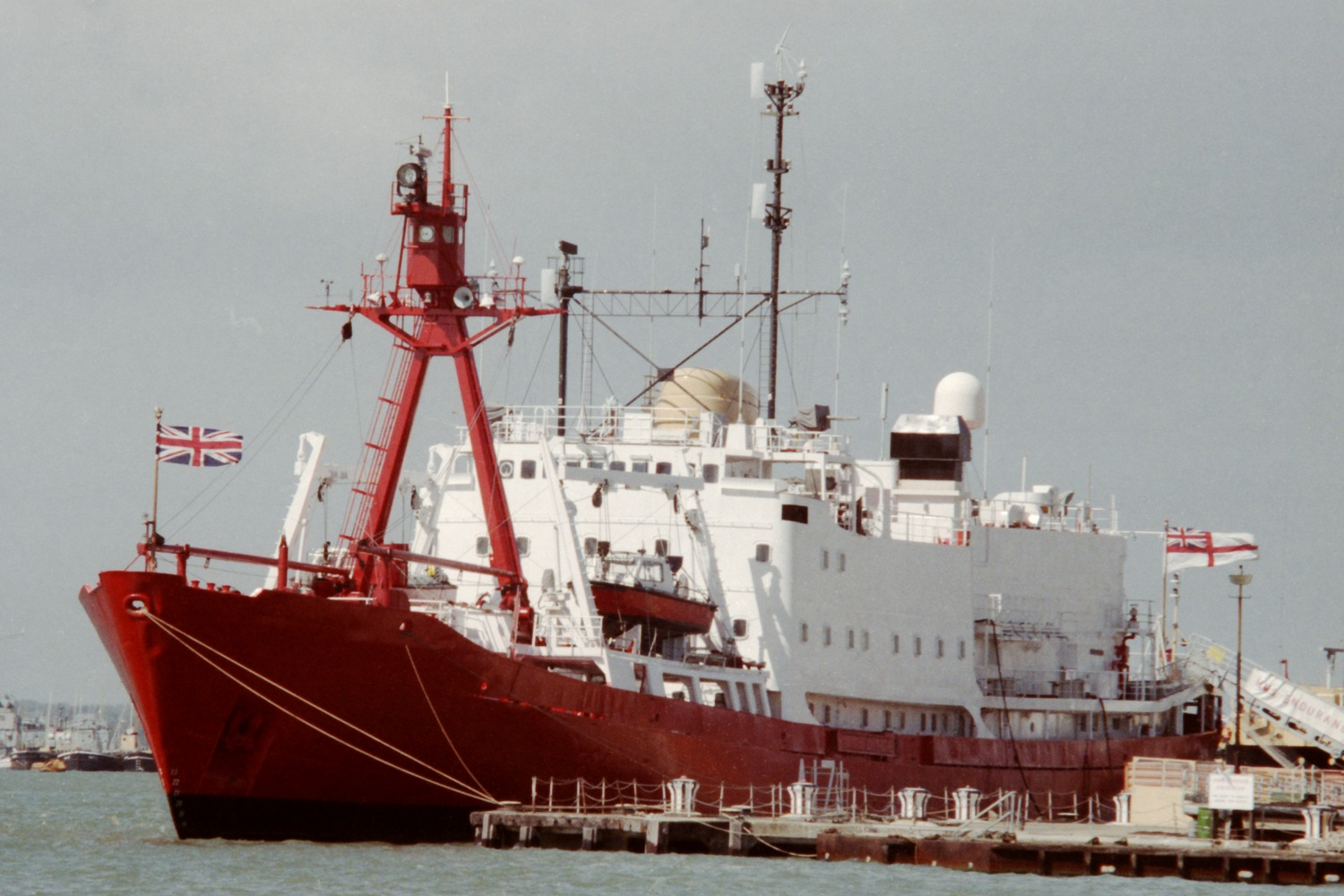
HMS Endurance (A-171) in Portsmouth harbour in 1988

On 19 March 1982, while Endurance was at Stanley, British authorities there received news that an Argentine navy ship had landed Argentine civilians on South Georgia who had raised the Argentine flag. The Argentine group (containing Argentine Marines in mufti) posing as scrap-metal merchants, occupied the abandoned whaling station at Leith Harbour on South Georgia. Endurance, commanded by Captain Nick Barker, was sent to order the Argentines off the island. Endurance had a small Royal Marines detachment and took further Marines from Naval Party 8901 (NP 8901), and sailed on 21 March for South Georgia.

Arriving on 25 March 1982 Endurance encountered the Argentine transport ARA Bahía Paraíso, whose forty Argentine troops had come ashore while the scrapping operation took place. Endurance landed her marines, then returned to the Falklands on 30 March. In April the UK command ordered Endurance to join the UK Task Force, which in April landed SBS soldiers at Hound Bay on South Georgia on 22 April.

Task Force vessels moved into deeper waters as a precaution against Argentine submarines, but Endurance moved into sea ice near the shore.

Endurance was involved in combat action on 25 April 1982 when her two Wasp ASW helicopters took part in attacks on the submarine ARA Santa Fe, which was later abandoned by her crew. When Argentine forces surrendered the next day, Endurance remained near the island to show the UK flag, maintain a naval presence, and guard the waters.

Endurance also took part in the rescue of wildlife film-makers Cindy Buxton and Annie Price, who were caught up in the war while working on South Georgia.

After the Argentine surrender of the Falkland Islands, Endurance, HMS Yarmouth, RFA Olmeda and the tug Salvageman sailed to the South Sandwich Islands, where Argentina had established a base in South Thule since 1976. Endurance was carrying a Wessex helicopter for the first time, in addition to her two Wasps. The ten Argentine military personnel surrendered after they saw HMS Yarmouth's firing display and when they realised recce marines from Endurance and 42 Commando Royal Marines had landed. The surrender was signed in the wardroom of Endurance.

=== 1983–1991 ===
Toward the end of her life the ship was nicknamed HMS Encumbrance due to reliability problems.

In 1989 she struck an iceberg, and, although she was repaired, a survey in 1991 found that her hull was not sound enough for a return to Antarctica, so she was finally decommissioned. She was replaced by Polar Circle, later renamed HMS Endurance.

== See also ==
- Endurance Reef – Bay in Antarctica
