= 20th Frigate Squadron =

- Active: November 1961 – 1966
- Country: United Kingdom
- Branch: Royal Navy
- Size: Squadron

Commanders
- First: Captain Denis Jermain
- Last: Captain Anthony S. Morton

The 20th Frigate Squadron was an administrative unit of the Royal Navy from 1961 to 1966.

== Operational history ==
A squadron of 4 frigates was established at Derry, Northern Ireland, in 1961 initially comprising HMS Undaunted, HMS Falmouth, HMS Rothesay and HMS Blackwood. The squadron was responsible for the advanced training of officers in anti-submarine warfare and for the evaluation of modern anti-submarine equipment. Although operational from Derry, the ships assigned to the squadron continued to carry out their refits and intermediate dockings at their base ports (HMNB Devonport, Portsmouth and Rosyth).

During its service, the squadron included Type 14, Type 15 and Rothesay-class frigates.

== Squadron commander ==
Commander	Ship	Dates
Captain Denis Jermain	HMS Yarmouth	November 1961-April 1963
Captain E. Gerard N. Mansfield	HMS Yarmouth	April 1963-December 1964
Captain Anthony S. Morton	HMS Yarmouth	December 1964 – 1966

== See also ==
- List of squadrons and flotillas of the Royal Navy
