= 1981 Defence White Paper =

UK defence policy

The 1981 Defence White Paper (titled "The UK Defence Programme: The Way Forward") was a major review of the United Kingdom's defence policy brought about by the Conservative government under the Prime Minister Margaret Thatcher. The main author was the then Secretary of State for Defence, John Nott. The aim of the review was to reduce expenditure during the early 1980s recession and to focus on supporting NATO rather than out of area operations. It was ultimately judged however to have been extremely detrimental to the United Kingdom's defence posture, being one of the contributing factors that led to the outbreak of the Falklands War.

== Royal Navy ==
This review proposed extensive cuts to the Royal Navy's surface fleet, including the sale of the new aircraft carrier Invincible to Australia thereby reducing the carrier fleet to just two vessels. Under the review, the Royal Navy was focused primarily on anti-submarine warfare under the auspices of NATO. Any out-of-area amphibious operations were considered unlikely. The entire Royal Marine amphibious force was in jeopardy of being disbanded and the review announced an intent to phase out both assault ships, Intrepid and Fearless, by 1984. Although an additional Type 22 frigate was confirmed ordered, Nott stated that nine of the navy's 59 escorts would be decommissioned, mainly from the County, Leander, and Rothesay classes. This decision was attributed to the growing cost of refitting and maintaining older warships. Several of the older destroyers and frigates would be placed on stand-by/reserve. Alongside the proposed hull cuts, Nott revealed that the navy would incur a manpower reduction of between 8,000 and 10,000 people.

Nott announced the intent to order five additional nuclear-powered attack submarines, eventually increasing the total to 17 and placing greater emphasis on the fleet's sub-surface forces. A new class of conventionally-powered attack submarines (the Type 2400) was also to be ordered. The Royal Navy's existing building programme of 20 surface warships was to be unaffected by the cuts, though the surface fleet would be downsized as ships were withdrawn from service at a faster rate than their replacements entered service. The White Paper also confirmed that the navy's acquisition of the Trident submarine-launched ballistic missile would move forward as part of the Government's plan to modernize the British nuclear deterrent.

The ice patrol ship Endurance was also due to be withdrawn from the South Atlantic. This was interpreted as a sign of weakness by the Argentine Government, encouraging the invasion of the Falkland Islands. Chatham Dockyard was also to be closed as an operational base. Feasibility studies for the Type 43 and Type 44 destroyers were also cancelled, together with the Sea Dart MkII surface-to-air missile.

== British Army ==
The regular army was to be reduced by 7,000 men (out of a total of 165,000), which was to be partly offset by the gradual expansion of the Territorial Army by a figure of 16,000 (from 70,000 to 86,000). In Germany, Britain's NATO land commitment was to be reduced by about 2,000, giving a total of 55,000. This was to be achieved by the withdrawal of a divisional headquarters.

In Nott's statement, it was announced that four armoured regiments would be equipped with the Challenger tank, while there would be an increase in the order of the MILAN anti-tank missile.

== Royal Air Force ==
Manpower losses for the Royal Air Force would amount to 2,500, but the white paper committed to retaining all of the RAF's projects, and confirmed the procurement of the AV-8B Harrier in collaboration with the United States. Two F-4 Phantom squadrons were to be retained for the air defence mission in the U.K. (together with two additional Phantom squadrons deployed in Germany) rather than being phased out with the introduction of the Panavia Tornado ADV, while the number of refitted Nimrod Mk II maritime patrol aircraft would be increased by three to 34.

Reflecting the white paper's emphasis on air defence, the number of Hawk trainers equipped with the AIM-9 Sidewinder air-to-air missile would be doubled to 72 with the intention of augmenting the Royal Air Force's front-line fighter squadrons.

== Controversy ==
In a 1982 live interview about the White Paper for the BBC 2 television programme Newsnight, during the interview by broadcaster Robin Day, taking umbrage at a perceived insult when Day made the comment on the lines that the public might question the judgement of a "here-today, gone-tomorrow politician" on the best long term defence interests of the country, Nott stood up, took off his microphone, and walked out on the interview.

== Impact of the Falklands War: December 1982 White Paper ==
In the aftermath of the Falklands War, many of the assumptions inherent in the 1981 defence review were re-visited. The December 1982 Defence White Paper introduced a number of initiatives "to increase the mobility and flexibility of our Armed Forces for future operations in the NATO area and elsewhere". These initiatives incorporated several measures to strengthen the Royal Navy including:

- Confirmation that three aircraft carriers would be retained in service, normally encompassing two active carriers with the third in refit or on stand-by;
- Confirmation that the assault ships, Fearless and Intrepid, would be retained (a decision already announced prior to the start of the Falklands War);
- Replacement of the Landing Ship RFA Sir Galahad, lost in the war, and the repair of RFA Sir Tristram, damaged in the war;
- Order of two additional Batch II and two Batch III Type 22 frigates to replace destroyers and frigates lost in the War;
- The intent to retain 55 destroyers and frigates in the active fleet and none on stand-by up to the mid-1980s (significantly modifying the decision in the 1981 review which aimed to reduce the destroyer and frigate fleet to 50 ships, with a number of these - up to eight - on stand-by/inactive);
- Incorporation of improved point air defence capabilities in the aircraft carriers, assault ships, Type 82-class destroyer and Type 42-class destroyers;
- Provision of an organic airborne early warning capability, based on the Searchwater radar, for each of the operational aircraft carriers;
- Replacement of all naval aircraft lost in the war plus the order of seven additional Sea Harrier fighters and six additional Sea King helicopters;
- Order of two additional Hunt-class mine countermeasures vessels;
- Retention of the ice patrol ship, HMS Endurance, in the South Atlantic.

Further initiatives were undertaken to also improve the "out-of-area" capabilities of the Army and Royal Air Force, including:

- Strengthening of 5 Brigade for future out-of-area operations and fitting of station-keeping equipment to a number of Hercules transport aircraft to provide the brigade a parachute assault capability by 1985;
- Acquisition of six Tristar aircraft for conversion into air-refueling tankers/strategic transports;
- Replacement of RAF Harriers and Chinook heavy-lift helicopters lost in the conflict, plus the purchase of five additional Chinooks;
- Purchase of at least 12 additional F-4 Phantom fighters from the United States to replace the Phantoms already in RAF service now assigned to the air defence of the Falkland Islands. These additional Phantom F4J(UK) aircraft made sure there would not be a gap in the air defence of the UK mainland;
- Purchase of 24 additional Rapier surface-to-air missile launchers for the Army and the RAF Regiment;
- Enhancement - by investing at least £10 million — of the number and range of items in the war stockpile specifically earmarked for the support of operations outside the NATO area.
