= Italian ship Scirocco =

Scirocco has been borne by at least two ships of the Italian Navy and may refer to:

- Italian destroyer Scirocco, a Maestrale-class destroyer launched in 1934 and sunk in 1942.
- Italian frigate Scirocco, a Maestrale-class frigate launched in 1982.
