= HMS Brilliant (F90) =

1981 Type 22 or Broadsword-class frigate of the Royal Navy

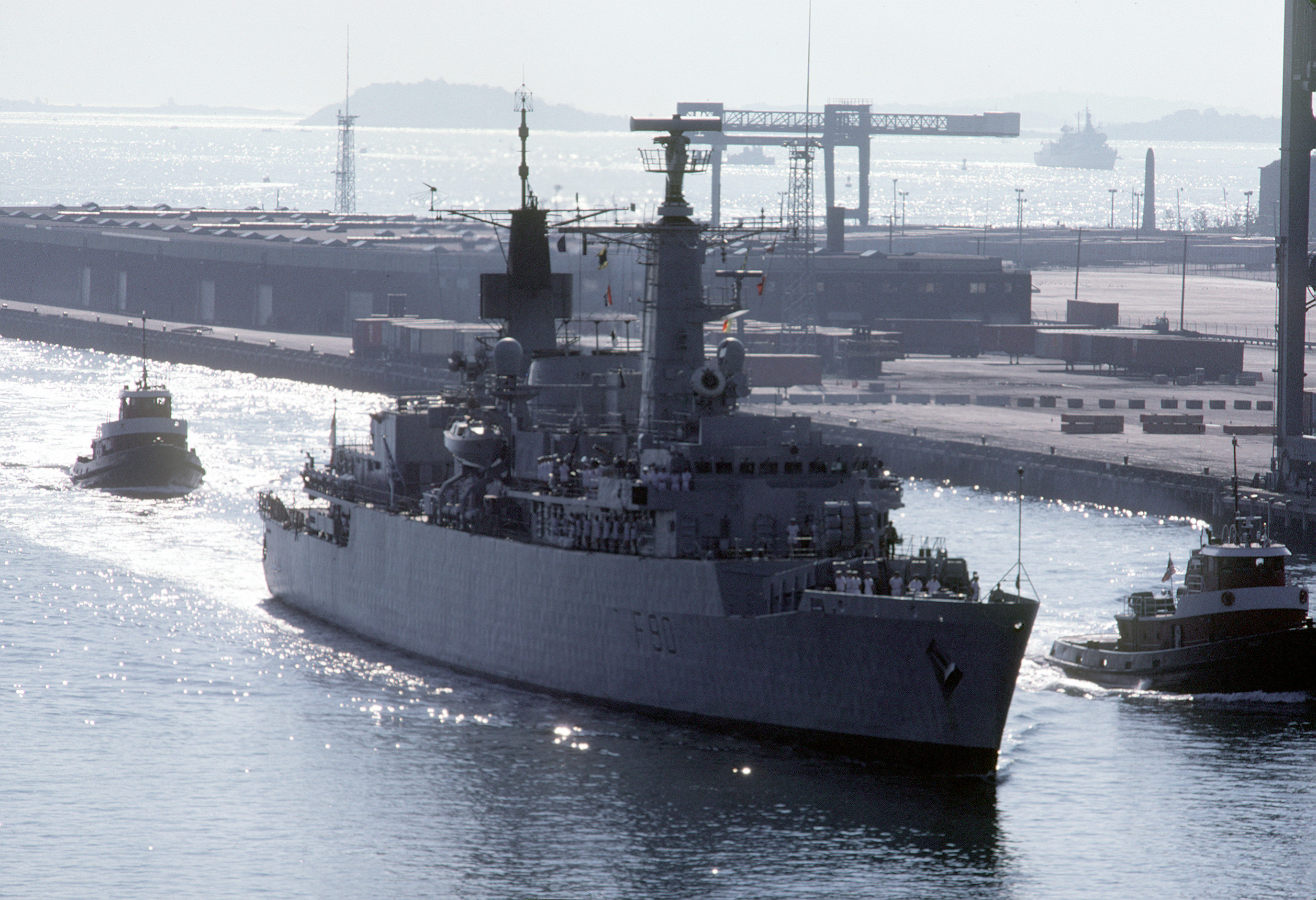
- HMS Brilliant enters a port during exercise Ocean Safari 1985

History

United Kingdom
- Name: HMS Brilliant
- Operator: Royal Navy
- Builder: Yarrow Shipbuilders
- Laid down: 25 March 1977
- Launched: 15 December 1978
- Commissioned: 15 May 1981
- Decommissioned: 1996
- Identification: Pennant number: F90
- Fate: Sold to Brazil 31 August 1996

Brazil
- Name: Dodsworth
- Operator: Brazilian Navy
- Identification: Pennant number: F-47
- Fate: Scrapped 2012

General characteristics
- Class & type: Type 22 frigate
- Displacement: 4,400 tons
- Length: 131.2 m (430 ft)
- Beam: 14.8 m (48 ft)
- Draught: 6.1 m (20 ft)
- Propulsion: 2 shafts, COGOG; 2 × Rolls-Royce Olympus TM3B boost gas turbines (54,600 shp); 2 × Rolls-Royce Tyne RM1C cruise gas turbines (9,700 shp)
- Speed: 18 knots (33 km/h) cruise; 30 knots (56 km/h) top speed
- Complement: 222
- Armament: 2 × 6 GWS25 Seawolf SAM launchers; 4 × 1 Exocet SSM launchers; 2 × 40 mm Bofors AA guns
- Aircraft carried: 2 × Lynx MK 3S helicopters
- Aviation facilities: 1 × double hangar with refuelling facilities

HMS Brilliant was a Batch 1 Type 22 frigate of the Royal Navy. She was named under the original convention that all Type 22s would bear ‘B’ names following the ‘A’ names of the Type 21 frigates; this policy was revised after the Falklands War to commemorate the destroyers Sheffield and Coventry, both sunk during the War, while the yet‑to‑be‑laid Bloodhound was renamed HMS London (F95).

Conceived as a specialist anti-submarine escort, she combined high speed with an advanced sonar suite and a flight deck for Westland Lynx helicopters. Ordered in February 1976, laid down by Yarrow Shipbuilders at Scotstoun and launched in May 1978, her construction cost was ~£110 million.

She was decommissioned from Royal Navy service in 1996, sold to the Brazilian Navy on 31 August 1996, where she was renamed Dodsworth. Dodsworth was sold for scrap and broken up at Aliağa, Turkey, during July 2012.

Brilliant took part in the only armed ship-to-ship engagement of the Falklands War, when she and HMS Yarmouth chased the Argentine coaster ARA Monsunen, in the Battle of Seal Cove.

== Royal Navy service ==
=== Falklands War ===
Brilliant was part of the task force that took part in the Falklands War, with Captain John Coward in command. She sailed south with two WE.177A nuclear depth charges on board, to avoid complications arising from the Treaty of Tlatelolco, these were transferred to RFA Fort Austin on 16 April 1982.

Brilliant was assigned to Operation Paraquet, the effort to retake the island of South Georgia. On 25 April her two helicopters, together with those of other warships in her group, disabled the Argentine submarine Santa Fe at South Georgia.

Brilliant was the first Royal Navy warship to fire the Sea Wolf missile in action when, on 12 May 1982, she shot down three A-4 Skyhawks.

On 21 May 1982, Brilliant came under Argentine air attack outside San Carlos Water and was lightly damaged by cannon fire. On 23 May she joined HMS Yarmouth in the chase of the Argentinian supply ship ARA Monsunen.

On 25 May she rescued 24 survivors from Atlantic Conveyor.

=== 1983–1996 ===
In 1987 she became leader of the 2nd Frigate Squadron. On 14 May 1989, the ship's helicopter, Lynx XZ244, crashed near Mombasa, Kenya, while en route to the city's airport for a period of shore leave. A door had detached when opened inflight and collided with the tail rotor, resulting in the aircraft splitting in half and the death of all nine personnel on board.

In October 1990 she saw the first members of the Women's Royal Naval Service to serve officially on an operational warship. In January 1991, Brilliant deployed to the Persian Gulf as part of the Operation Granby Task Force, in the First Gulf War. Brilliant starred in a BBC documentary series called HMS Brilliant – In a Ship's Company by the journalist Chris Terrill in 1994, while she was undertaking an operational tour off the coast of former Yugoslavia enforcing a United Nations arms embargo in the Adriatic sea.

== Brazilian Navy service ==
She was decommissioned from Royal Navy service in 1996 and sold to the Brazilian Navy on 31 August 1996 and renamed Dodsworth.

F47 Dodsworth was sold for scrap and broken up at Aliağa, Turkey, during July 2012.

The silhouette of HMS Brilliant is painted, with the date 21 May, on the side of Argentine Air Force IAI Finger serial number C-412. Also painted on C-412 is the silhouette of HMS Arrow and the date 1 May. These kill markings (without crossing) have to do with damage to both ships in the Falklands War, HMS Arrow being slightly damaged by cannon fire 1 May 1982 and HMS Brilliant also being slightly damaged by cannon fire on 21 May. C-412's markings were painted soon after the war; they were seen during the November 2005 multi-national Exercise Ceibo in Argentina.
