= HMS Arrow (F173) =

Type 21 or Amazon-class frigate of the Royal Navy and Pakistan Navy

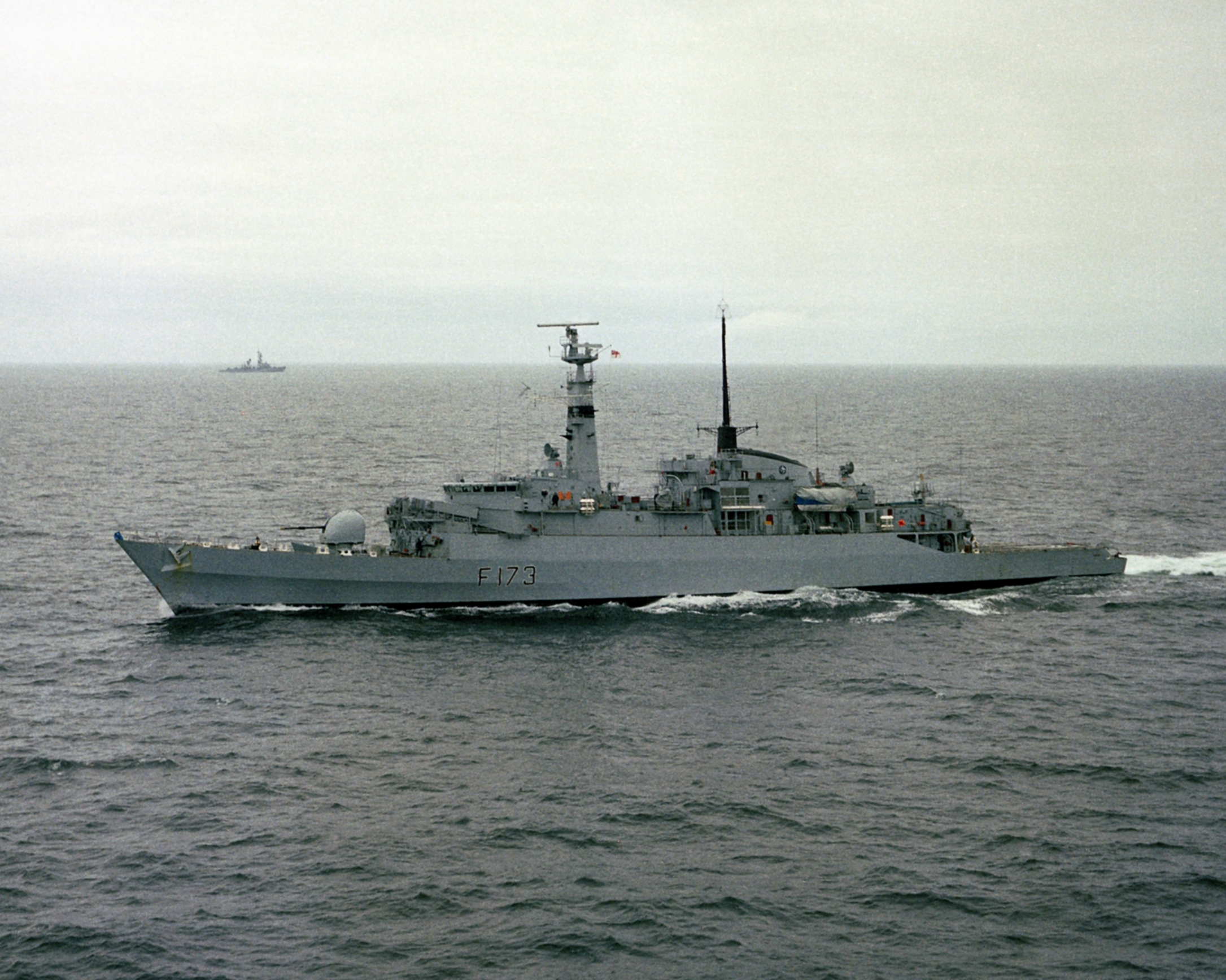

History

United Kingdom
- Name: HMS Arrow
- Builder: Yarrow Shipbuilders
- Laid down: 28 September 1972
- Launched: 5 February 1974
- Commissioned: 28 July 1976
- Decommissioned: 1 March 1994
- Identification: Pennant number: F173
- Motto: Celeriter certus; (Latin: "Swiftly sure")
- Fate: Sold to Pakistan on 1 March 1994

Pakistan
- Name: PNS Khaibar
- Acquired: 1 March 1994
- Fate: Sunk as a target during SEASPARK-2022 naval exercise.

General characteristics
- Class & type: Type 21 frigate
- Displacement: 3,250 tons full load
- Length: 384 ft (117 m)
- Beam: 41 ft 9 in (12.73 m)
- Draught: 19 ft 6 in (5.94 m)
- Propulsion: COGOG: 2 × Rolls-Royce Olympus gas turbines; 2 × Rolls-Royce Tyne RM1A gas turbines for cruising
- Speed: 32 knots (59 km/h; 37 mph)
- Range: 4,000 nmi (7,408 km; 4,603 mi) at 17 knots (31 km/h; 20 mph)
- Complement: 177
- Armament: RN: 1 × 4.5-inch (114 mm) Mark 8 naval gun; 2 × Oerlikon 20 mm cannon; 4 × MM38 Exocet missiles; 1 × quadruple Sea Cat SAMs; 2 × triple ASW torpedo tubes; 2 × Corvus chaff launchers; 1 × Type 182 towed decoy; Pakistan: 1 × 4.5-inch (114 mm) Mark 8 naval gun; 2 × Oerlikon 20 mm cannon; 1 × Phalanx CIWS; 1 × 6-cell LY-60N Hunting Eagle SAM launcher; 2 × Mark 36 SRBOC chaff launchers; 1 × Type 182 towed decoy
- Aircraft carried: 1 × Westland Wasp helicopter, later refitted for 1 × Lynx

HMS Arrow was a Type 21 frigate of the Royal Navy.

Arrow was active during the Falklands War of 1982, where she provided naval gunfire support (NGFS) and rescued most of the surviving crew from HMS Sheffield. She was sold to Pakistan on 1 March 1994 and renamed PNS Khaibar.

== Background ==
Built by Yarrow Shipbuilders Ltd, Glasgow, Scotland, she was completed with Exocet launchers in 'B' position. During 1976-1977 her first captain was Commander Nick J Barker.

== Falklands War service ==
During the 1982 Falklands War, Arrow was the first British ship to see action when she shelled Argentine positions around Port Stanley airfield on 1 May and the first to be hit by an Argentine Air Force aircraft, sustaining several cannon shell hits to her funnel uptake and other parts of the superstructure. She had one casualty from shell splinters.

On 4 May she assisted in extinguishing the fires and evacuating the crew of the Type 42 destroyer HMS Sheffield, which had been struck by an Exocet missile, rescuing 225 of the 261 surviving crew. Arrow's captain, Commander (later Captain) Paul Bootherstone was subsequently awarded the Distinguished Service Cross for this action.

On 6 May Arrow shelled Argentine positions around Fox Bay West Falkland.

On the night of 10–11 May, Arrow lay at the northern end of Falkland Sound, the channel which separates West and East Falkland, whilst her sister ship HMS Alacrity transited it from south to north to assess if the channel was mined. Alacrity left the channel just before dawn and Arrow was waiting to accompany her back to the Task Force when the Argentine submarine San Luis, captained by Fernando Azcueta, fired two SST-4 torpedoes at a range of 5000 yards. One did not leave its tube; the other hit the towed Type 182 decoy.

On 28 May, Arrow provided naval gunfire support to the Second Battalion, The Parachute Regiment's assault on Goose Green. She fired 22 star shells and 135 rounds of 4.5" high-explosive, during a 90-minute bombardment.

Arrow remained in Bomb Alley (San Carlos Water anchorage) longer than any other ship while receiving temporary repairs to hull cracks by having Seadart lifting beams welded to her upper decks.

On passage east toward Fitzroy on the night of 5 June Arrow detected an unknown surface target close to the shore and fired three star shells over what turned out to be a UK Landing Craft Mechanised (LCM) which was then escorted to Berkeley Sound. These were the last Mk 8 Illumination rounds fired during the conflict. In early June 1982 Arrow gave supporting fire in the battles that led up to the Argentine surrender.

She returned home to Devonport Naval Base on 7 July 1982, welcomed home by the Red Arrows display team, with whom she had an association.

=== Argentine claim ===
The silhouette of Arrow, along with the date 1 May, was painted on the side of Argentine Air Force Dagger C-412 along with the silhouette representation of HMS Brilliant and the 21 May, implying a successful action against these vessels. These refer to damage which both ships suffered during the conflict, which may not have been caused by this particular aircraft. Arrow was slightly damaged on 1 May 1982, and HMS Brilliant was damaged by cannon fire on 21 May 1982 outside San Carlos Water. The aircraft was still bearing these silhouettes in November 2005 at the multi-national Exercise Ceibo in Argentina.

== Later Royal Navy service ==
By the mid-1980s Arrow was suffering from cracking in her hull. Much of this had first arisen during the Falklands conflict, when engineers were obliged to weld steel plates and girders to parts of the ship where cracks were opening up in the aluminium superstructure. After the war, she was taken in for refitting, with a large steel plate being welded down each side of the ship. At the same time modifications were made to reduce hull noise.

In early 1985, Arrow spent 3 1/2 months as Guardship in the West Indies. The vessel continued in service until 1994, and was decommissioned and removed from the fleet on 1 March that year.

In July 1991, Arrow was returning from a deployment to the South Atlantic when it joined a US Coast Guard patrol boat in the Caribbean, and played a major role in an operation which resulted in the seizure of 1,500lbs of smuggled cocaine.

== Pakistan Navy service ==
Following decommissioning Arrow was transferred to Pakistan and renamed PNS Khaibar. The Exocet missile system was not transferred to Pakistan and Khaibar had her obsolete Sea Cat missile launcher removed. A Phalanx CIWS was later fitted in place of the Sea Cat launcher. SRBOC chaff launchers and 20 mm and 30 mm guns were fitted. Khaibar remains in service with the Pakistan Navy, who purchased from the United Kingdom Government all six surviving Type 21 frigates of the eight originally built (two were lost in the Falklands).

== Publications ==
- Colledge, J. J.; Warlow, Ben (2006) [1969]. Ships of the Royal Navy: The Complete Record of All Fighting Ships of the Royal Navy from the 15th Century to the Present (3rd Rev ed.). London: Chatham Publishing. ISBN 978-1-86176-281-8. OCLC 67375475.
- Marriott, Leo, 1983. Royal Navy Frigates 1945-1983, Ian Allan Ltd, Surrey. ISBN 978-0-7110-1322-3
