= HMS Yarmouth (F101) =

1960 Type 12M or Rothesay-class frigate of the Royal Navy

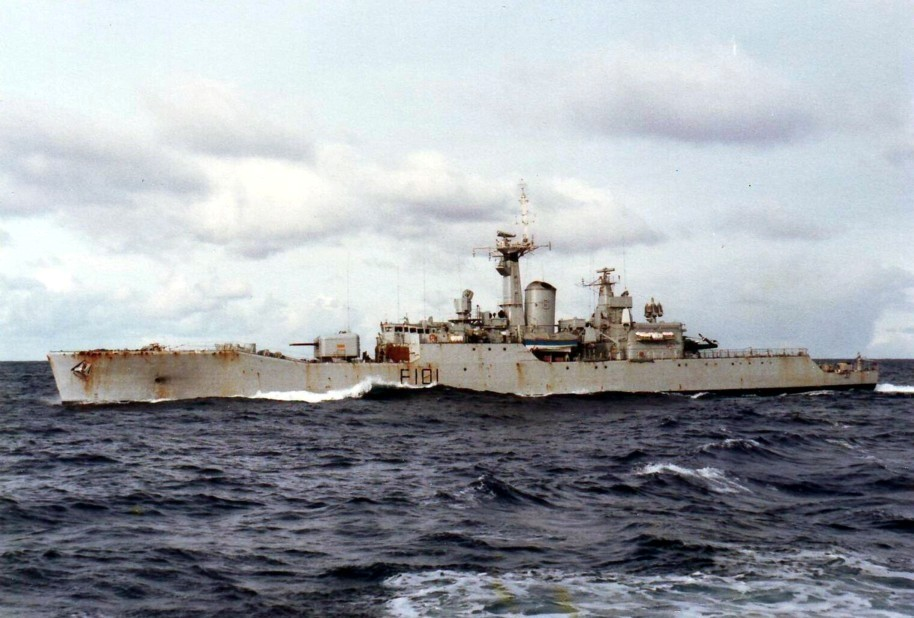

History

United Kingdom
- Name: HMS Yarmouth
- Operator: Royal Navy
- Builder: John Brown & Company
- Laid down: 29 November 1957
- Launched: 23 March 1959
- Commissioned: 26 March 1960
- Decommissioned: 30 April 1986
- Home port: Rosyth, Scotland
- Identification: Pennant number: F101
- Motto: Rex et Jura Nostra; (Latin: "Our King and Laws")
- Nickname(s): The Fighting 101, The Crazy 'Y', The Rubber Duck
- Fate: Sunk as target practice by HMS Manchester 16 June 1987

General characteristics
- Class & type: Rothesay-class frigate
- Displacement: 2800 tons
- Armament: 2 x 4.5 inch (113 mm) Mark 6 guns, 1 x quad Seacat SAM launcher, 1 x Limbo mortar, 2 x 20 mm Oerlikon guns

HMS Yarmouth was the first modified Type 12 frigate of the Rothesay-class frigate to enter service with the Royal Navy.

She was rammed in the Third Cod War by the Icelandic gunboat ICGV Baldur (1973) and had to limp away from the patrol area for repairs.

During the Falklands War, Yarmouth took part in the only encounter between armed ships of the war, when she and HMS Brilliant (F90) shelled and forced to run aground the Argentine coaster ARA Monsunen, in a failed effort to capture the small vessel. In the last action of the conflict, Yarmouth and HMS Endurance (1967) recaptured the South Sandwich Islands.

== Design ==
The Rothesay-class was an improved version of the Whitby-class anti-submarine frigate, with nine Rothesays ordered in the 1954–55 shipbuilding programme for the Royal Navy to supplement the six Whitbys.

Yarmouth was 370 feet 0 inches (112.78 m) long overall and 360 feet 0 inches (109.73 m) between perpendiculars, with a beam of 41 feet 0 inches (12.50 m) and a draught of 13 feet 6 inches (4.11 m). The Rothesays were powered by the same Y-100 machinery used by the Whitby-class. Two Babcock & Wilcox water-tube boilers fed steam at 550 pounds per square inch (3,800 kPa) and 850 °F (454 °C) to two sets of geared steam turbines which drove two propeller shafts, fitted with large (20 feet (6.1 m) diameter) slow-turning propellers. The machinery was rated at 30,000 shaft horsepower (22,000 kW), giving a speed of 29.5 knots (33.9 mph; 54.6 km/h). Crew was about 212 officers and men. (Note: Conway's states the crew of a Rothesay ranged from 200–235, while Jane's Fighting Ships 1962–63 states a crew of 200 (9 officers and 191 ratings))

A twin 4.5-inch (113 mm) Mark 6 gun mount was fitted forward, with 350 rounds of ammunition carried. It was originally intended to fit a twin 40 mm L/70 Bofors anti-aircraft mount aft, but in 1957 it was decided to fit the Seacat anti-aircraft missile instead. Seacat was not yet ready, and Yarmouth was completed with a single L/60 40 mm Bofors mount aft as a temporary anti-aircraft armament. The design anti-submarine armament consisted of twelve 21-inch torpedo-tubes (eight fixed and two twin rotating mounts) for Mark 20E Bidder homing anti-submarine torpedoes, backed up by two Limbo anti-submarine mortars fitted aft. The Bidder homing torpedoes proved unsuccessful however, being too slow to catch modern submarines, and the torpedo tubes were soon removed.

The ship was fitted with a Type 293Q surface/air search radar on the foremast, with a Type 277 height-finding radar on a short mast forward of the foremast. A Mark 6M fire control system (including a Type 275 radar) for the 4.5 inch guns was mounted above the ship's bridge, while a Type 974 navigation radar was also fitted. The ship's sonar fit consisted of Type 174 search, Type 170 fire control sonar for Limbo and a Type 162 sonar for classifying targets on the sea floor.

Yarmouth was laid down at John Brown's Clydebank dockyard on 29 November 1957, was launched on 23 March 1959 and completed on 26 March 1960.

=== Modernisation ===
From 1966 to 1968 Yarmouth underwent a major modernisation, which brought the ship close in capacity to the Leander-class. A hangar and flight deck was added aft to allow a Westland Wasp helicopter to be operated, at the expense of one of the Limbo anti-submarine mortars, while a Seacat launcher and the associated GWS20 director was mounted on the hangar roof. Two 20-mm cannons were added either side of the ship's bridge. A MRS3 fire control system replaced the Mark 6M, and its integral Type 903 radar allowed the Type 277 height finder radar to be removed. A Type 993 surface/air-search radar replaced the existing Type 293Q radar, while the ship's defences were enhanced by the addition of the Corvus chaff rocket dispenser.

== Operational history ==
Yarmouth commissioned on 24 March 1960, with the Pennant number F101, and joined the 6th Frigate Squadron of the Home Fleet as leader. She was refitted at Devonport from December 1961 to February 1962, then became the leader of the 20th Frigate Squadron at Londonderry, serving in that role until 1966.

On 13 July 1965 she collided with the submarine Tiptoe, 10 miles south east of Portland Bill. Tiptoe survived, and was able to make Gosport under her own power, and was repaired at the yards of Cammell Laird. Tiptoe's commanding officer was found guilty of negligence for the accident. In May 1966 she began a long refit and modernisation at Portsmouth Dockyard. The main alterations were to build a hangar and flight deck for a Wasp Helicopter and to fit Seacat anti-aircraft missiles. She recommissioned on 1 October 1968 for service in the Western Fleet and then in the Far East Fleet. In 1971 she was present at Portsmouth Navy Days.

In April 1970 whilst on the Beira Patrol she was diverted to be a long stop for the rescue of Apollo 13. Communications in the Indian Ocean were very poor. The recovery instructions were sent from Houston to Halifax, Nova Scotia where the Royal Canadian Navy sent them by Morse Code to the ship. The recovery manual was taken down by communications ratings, two at a time, with pencil and paper. Luckily the space craft came down amongst a US Navy task force with two aircraft carriers and television cameras in the Pacific Ocean.

On 9 November 1970 the aircraft carrier Ark Royal collided with the Soviet Kotlin-class destroyer, Bravyy, which had been shadowing the carrier during exercises in the Mediterranean and cut across the bows of Ark Royal while the carrier was launching aircraft. Several of Bravyy's crew were washed overboard in the incident with Yarmouth rescuing two of them, although two of the seven Soviet sailors were lost in the accident. A few days later, the tanker Esso Chile suffered an explosion off Malta which had killed one and injured two of the tanker's crew. Yarmouth's helicopter flew a doctor over to Esso Chile and ferried the wounded to shore for further medical treatment.

=== Third Cod War ===
On 28 February 1976, in the course of the Third Cod War, Yarmouth collided with ICGV Baldur's stern, severely damaging the frigate's bow and forcing her to limp away from the patrol area assisted by the Royal Maritime Auxiliary Service tug Rollicker. Yarmouth underwent repairs at Chatham where she was fitted with a new bow section. The heavy damage and pressure on the defence budget saw HMS Yarmouth offered to the RNZN later in 1976, but the offer was rejected on account of the frigate's age.

=== Falklands War ===
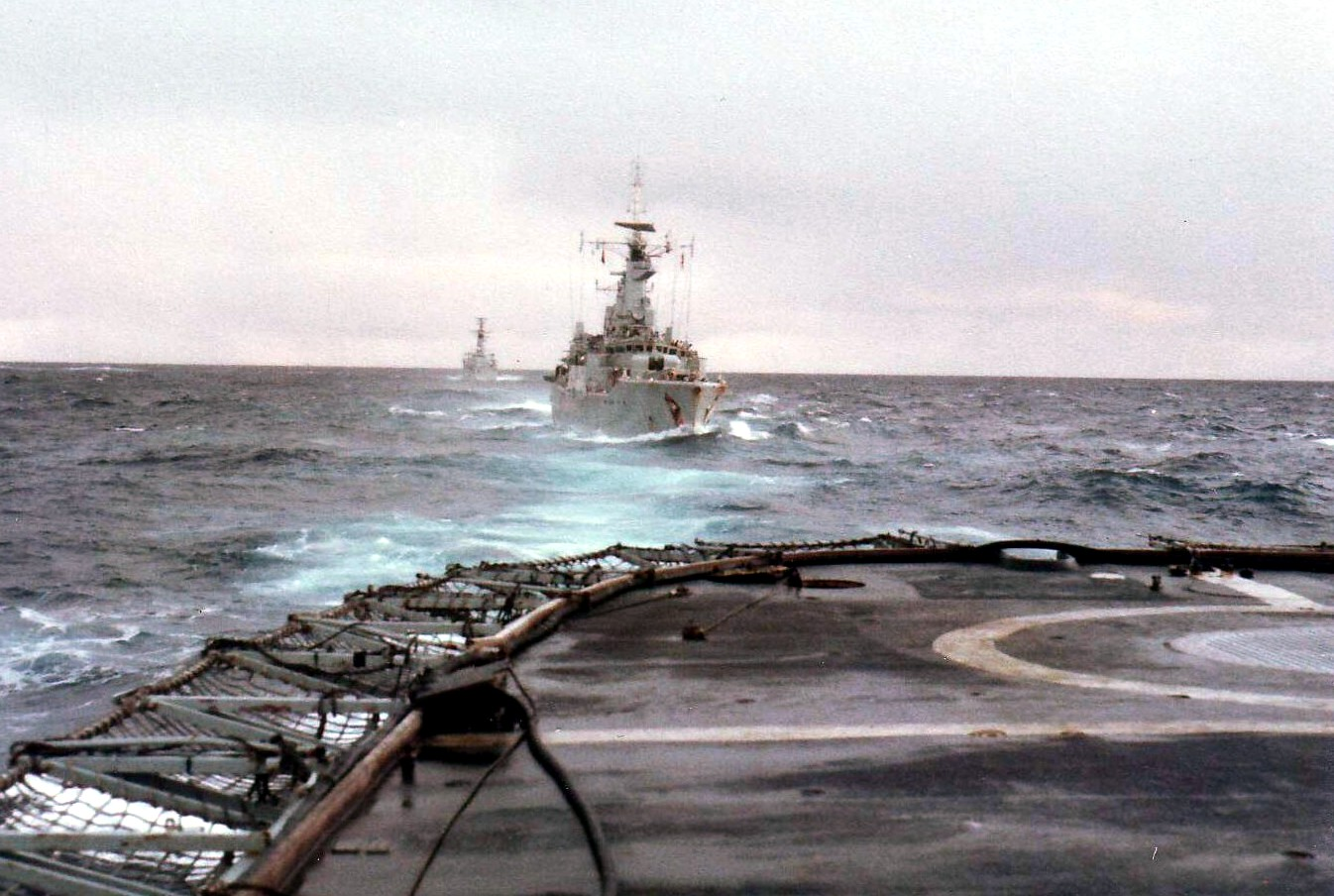
Yarmouth sailing astern of Cardiff in the south Atlantic with Andromeda.

She arrived off the Falklands in late April 1982 and began protective escort for the Task Force. On 4 May, when Sheffield was hit by an Exocet missile, Yarmouth provided anti-submarine protection as Arrow attempted to fight the fire. After Sheffield had been abandoned, Yarmouth took her in tow in order to get her to a safe area. However, after 29 hours the winds rose to gale force and Sheffield finally sank on 10 May at 7 am.

When the amphibious task force arrived on 19 May, Yarmouth provided an anti-air and anti-submarine escort as the force moved into San Carlos Water as part of Operation Sutton. On 21 May when Ardent was bombed and set on fire by Argentine Skyhawks, Yarmouth rescued the crew of the stricken ship and later transferred them to the SS Canberra. For the next ten days she continued to act in an air defence role during the battle of San Carlos by day, but by night operated a variety of missions including shore bombardment, anti-submarine patrols, covert operations and escorting merchant ships to and from the landing area.

In the early hours of 23 May, in what became the only encounter between armed surface ships in the war, Yarmouth and Brilliant intercepted the Argentine armed coaster ARA Monsunen. Yarmouth engaged the coaster with her 4.5" guns west of Lively Island; the Argentine vessel evaded capture by running aground at Seal Cove. Monsunen was eventually salvaged by ARA Forrest, another armed coaster of the Argentine Navy.

On 25 May Yarmouth claimed to have shot down an A-4C Skyhawk (C-319), flown by Teniente Tomás Lucero, with her Sea Cat missile system, although this aircraft was subjected to the full force of the San Carlos' air defences, with other claims from Rapier, Blowpipe and ship-based gunfire. Lucero ejected and was recovered by Fearless.

After two days of maintenance in the repair area, she returned to bombardment duties beginning on 6 June. These she carried out by night while by day she travelled some 200 miles back to the task force to replenish fuel and ammunition. On 9 June, during one of these missions, she came across a derelict landing craft and a small coaster whose propeller had become fouled with rope. The small ship was no other than Monsunen, recovered by the British after the battle of Goose Green. The landing barge had been bombed by Argentine aircraft and was eventually lost; the coaster had been ferrying Gurkhas and supplies to Darwin when called to the rescue. Yarmouth's diving team managed to free the vessel. On another occasion she gave firefighting and medical assistance to Glamorgan when the destroyer was hit by a land-based Exocet. On 13–14 June, she and Active shelled Argentine positions during the Battle of Mount Tumbledown. During the war, she fired over 1,000 shells from her main guns, mostly during shore bombardment, and 58 anti-submarine Limbo mortar rounds.

After the Argentine surrender of the Falkland Islands, Yarmouth, HMS Endurance, RFA Olmeda and the tug Salvageman sailed to the South Sandwich Islands where Argentina had established a base in South Thule since 1976. Following a demonstration of the Yarmouth's guns, the ten Argentine military personnel surrendered.

Before leaving South Thule, Yarmouth was refuelled by the RFA Olmeda on 21 June, which may have been the most southerly RAS(L) in the history of the Royal Navy.

== Decommissioning ==
She was decommissioned on 30 April 1986, and in 1987 towed out to the North Atlantic and sunk by weapons from Manchester in that year's SinkEx on 16 June 1987.

== Publications ==
- Blackman, Raymond V. B. (1962). Jane's Fighting Ships 1962–63. London: Sampson Low, Marston & Co., Ltd.
- Burden, Rodney A.; Draper, Michael I.; Rough, Douglas A.; Smith, Colin A.; Wilton, David (1986). Falklands: The Air War. British Aviation Research Group. ISBN 0-906339-05-7.
- Colledge, J. J.; Warlow, Ben (2006) [1969]. Ships of the Royal Navy: The Complete Record of All Fighting Ships of the Royal Navy from the 15th Century to the Present (3rd Rev ed.). London: Chatham Publishing. ISBN 978-1-86176-281-8. OCLC 67375475.
- Critchley, Mike (1985). Falklands: Task Force Portfolio Part 2. Liskeard, UK: Maritime Press. ISBN 0-907771-03-3.
- Critchley, Mike (1981). British Warships Since 1945: Part 2. Liskeard, UK: Maritime Press. ISBN 0-9506323-6-8.
- Critchley, Mike (1992). British Warships Since 1945: Part 5: Frigates. Liskeard, UK: Maritime Press. ISBN 0-907771-13-0.
- Freedman, Lawrence (2004). The Official History of the Falklands Campaign, Volume 2: War and Diplomacy. London: Routledge. ISBN 1135775834.
- Friedman, Norman (2008). British Destroyers & Frigates: The Second World War and After. Barnsley, UK: Seaforth Publishing. ISBN 978-1-84832-015-4.
- Gardiner, Robert; Chumbley, Stephen, eds. (1995). Conway's All The World's Fighting Ships 1947–1995. Annapolis, Maryland, USA: Naval Institute Press. ISBN 1-55750-132-7.
- Marriott, Leo (1983). Royal Navy Frigates 1945–1983. Shepperton, Surrey, UK: Ian Allan Ltd. ISBN 0-7110-1322-5.
- Mayorga, Horacio A. (1998). No Vencidos. Ed. Planeta, Buenos Aires. ISBN 950-742-976-X (in Spanish)
- Middlebrook, Martin (2012). The Falklands War. Barnsley, UK: Pen & Sword Military. ISBN 978-1-84884-636-4.
- Roberts, John (2009). Safeguarding the Nation: The Story of the Royal Navy. Barnsley, UK: Seaforth Publishing. ISBN 978-1-84832-043-7.
