= Lively Island =

- Island
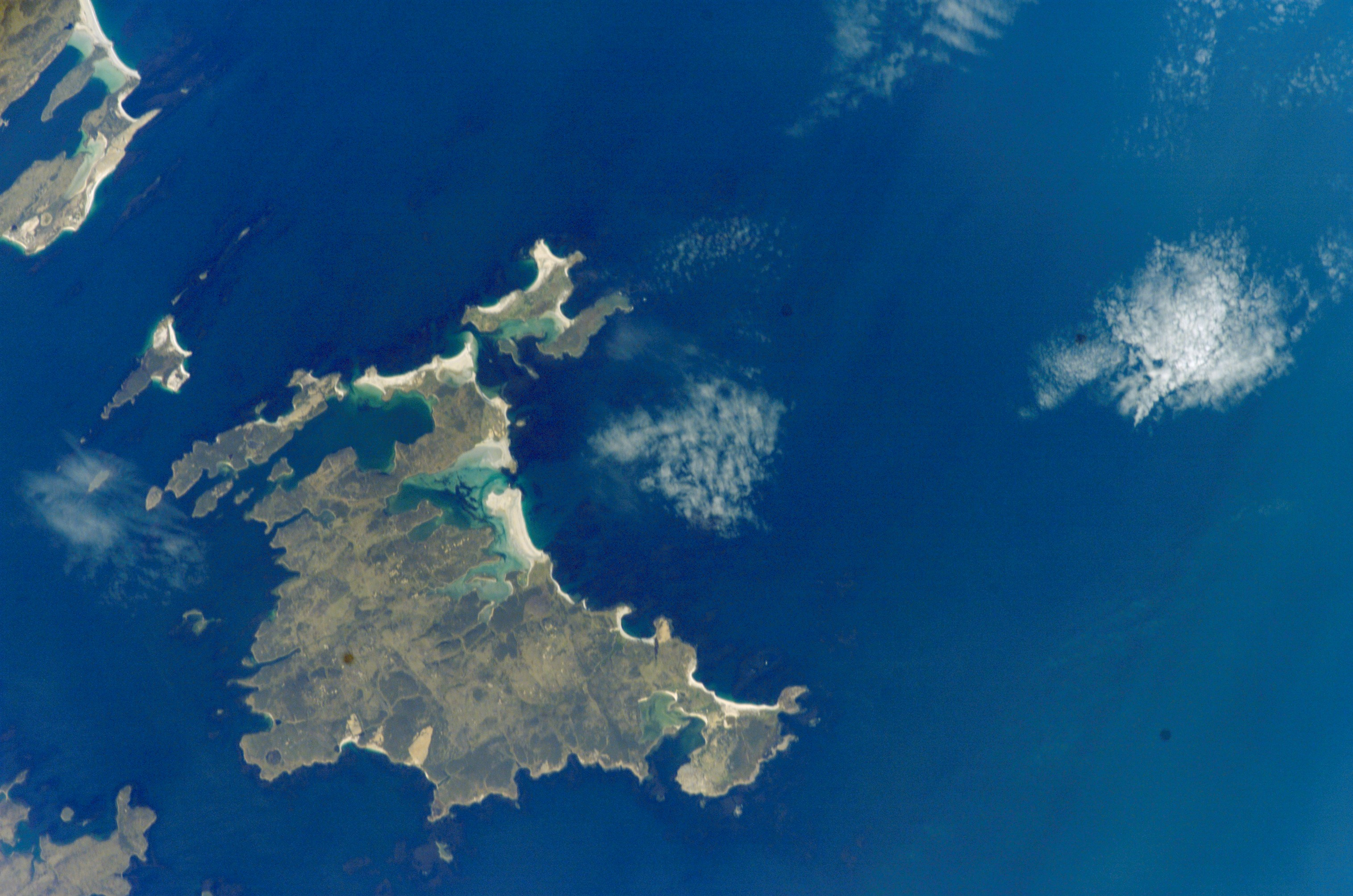

- Lively Island shown within the Falkland Islands
- Coordinates: 52°01′46″S 58°28′01″W
- Country: Falkland Islands
- Island group: Lively Island Group

Area
  - Total: 55.85 km^{2} (21.56 sq mi)
- Highest elevation: 37 m (121 ft)
- Time zone: UTC−3 (FKST)
- If shown, area and population ranks are for all islands and all inhabited islands in the Falklands respectively.

Lively Island (Spanish: Isla Bougainville) is the largest of the Lively Island Group of the Falkland Islands, The island group lies east of East Falkland. Lively Island is the largest rat-free island in the Falklands, hence its importance to birdlife. The island is owned by Steven and Chris Poole who also run a sheep farm on the island.

== History ==
The Spanish name, "Isla Bougainville" (like Port Louis) is named after the French navigator Louis de Bougainville, who established the first settlement in the archipelago in the 1760s.

In the late 19th and early 20th centuries, the island was owned by George Cobb. It was sold after World War I to pay taxes.

During the Falklands War, the Battle of Seal Cove took place near Lively Island. Seal Cove is a bay in East Falkland directly to the west of the island.

== Description ==
Lively Island has an area of 5,585 hectares (13,800 acres). Its highest point is 37 metres (121 ft). There are several streams and ponds, the largest of which is Enderby Pond, 7 hectares (17 acres), an important waterfowl site. Lively is rat-free but with a century and a half of grazing little tussac grass remains and there are many large patches of eroded ground. Habitat restoration work has been started by the current owners by planting tussac and sandgrass on eroded areas.

Lively Island is surrounded by other, smaller islands and islets in the Lively Island group. Some of these Islets are linked to Lively Island by sandbars. North East Island which is just 350 metres (380 yd) off the coast of Lively, was the site of a rat eradication programme in 2003. (The rest of the Lively islands are rat free.)

=== Important Bird Area ===
The Lively Island group has been identified by BirdLife International as an Important Bird Area. Birds for which the site is of conservation significance include Falkland steamer ducks, ruddy-headed geese, gentoo penguins (650 breeding pairs), Magellanic penguins, southern giant petrels (40 pairs), white-bridled finches, blackish cinclodes and Cobb's wrens.
