= Type 43 destroyer =

Proposed class of British destroyers

Class overview
- Name: Type 43 Destroyer
- Operators: Royal Navy Jack Royal Navy
- Preceded by: Type 42
- Subclasses: Type 44
- Planned: 8
- Canceled: 8

General characteristics
- Length: 573 feet (175 m)
- Beam: 59 feet (18 m)
- Speed: 31.5 knots (58.3 km/h; 36.2 mph)
- Sensors & processing systems: AWADS Combat Data System; Type 1022 Air Search Radar × 1; Type 1006 Navigation Radar × 1; Type 909 Sea Dart Fire Control Radar × 4; Type 910 Sea Wolf Fire Control Radar × 2; SCOT Satellite Communications System; Type 184 Search Sonar; Type 162M Bottom Classification Sonar; Type 185 Underwater Telephone
- Electronic warfare & decoys: Sea Gnat Chaff Launchers × 2; Type 182 Torpedo Decoy × 1
- Armament: 1 × 4.5"/55-caliber Mk.8 naval gun; 2 × twin GWS.31 Sea Dart II SAM Launchers; 4 × sextuple Sea Wolf SAM Launchers; 4 × MM38 Exocet anti-ship missiles; 2 × Oerlikon/BMARC 20mm/70-caliber KBA guns in GAM-B01 single mounts; 2 × STWS triple torpedo tubes
- Aircraft carried: 2 × Westland Lynx or 1 × Sea King/AgustaWestland AW101 Merlin
- Notes: Programme cancelled 1981.

The Type 43 was a proposed destroyer class for the Royal Navy. It was intended to follow on from the Type 42 but armed with the Sea Dart Mark II missile. The primary role of the Type 43 was to protect a task force from air-launched missile attack. There were two proposed variants - the small variant and the large variant. The project advanced to feasibility design before being cancelled in 1981.

== Small variant ==
The design for the small variant Type 43 resembled a Type 42 with one twin Sea Dart launcher forward and directors fore and aft.

== Large variant ==
The design for the large variant Type 43 had twin Sea Dart launchers both forward and aft with four radar directors. Also, two GWS.25 Seawolf launchers were located forward and aft. With launchers at both ends the flight deck was relocated midships between the two superstructure blocks. The helicopter hangar would have room for one Merlin or two Lynx helicopters.

== Type 44 ==
The Type 44 was proposed as a similar to the small variant Type 43, but with enhanced anti-submarine capability.

== Cancellation ==
The Type 43/44 programme was cancelled by the Secretary of State for Defence John Nott in the 1981 defence review.
