= RFA Tideforce =

2019 Tide-class replenishment tanker of the Royal Fleet Auxiliary

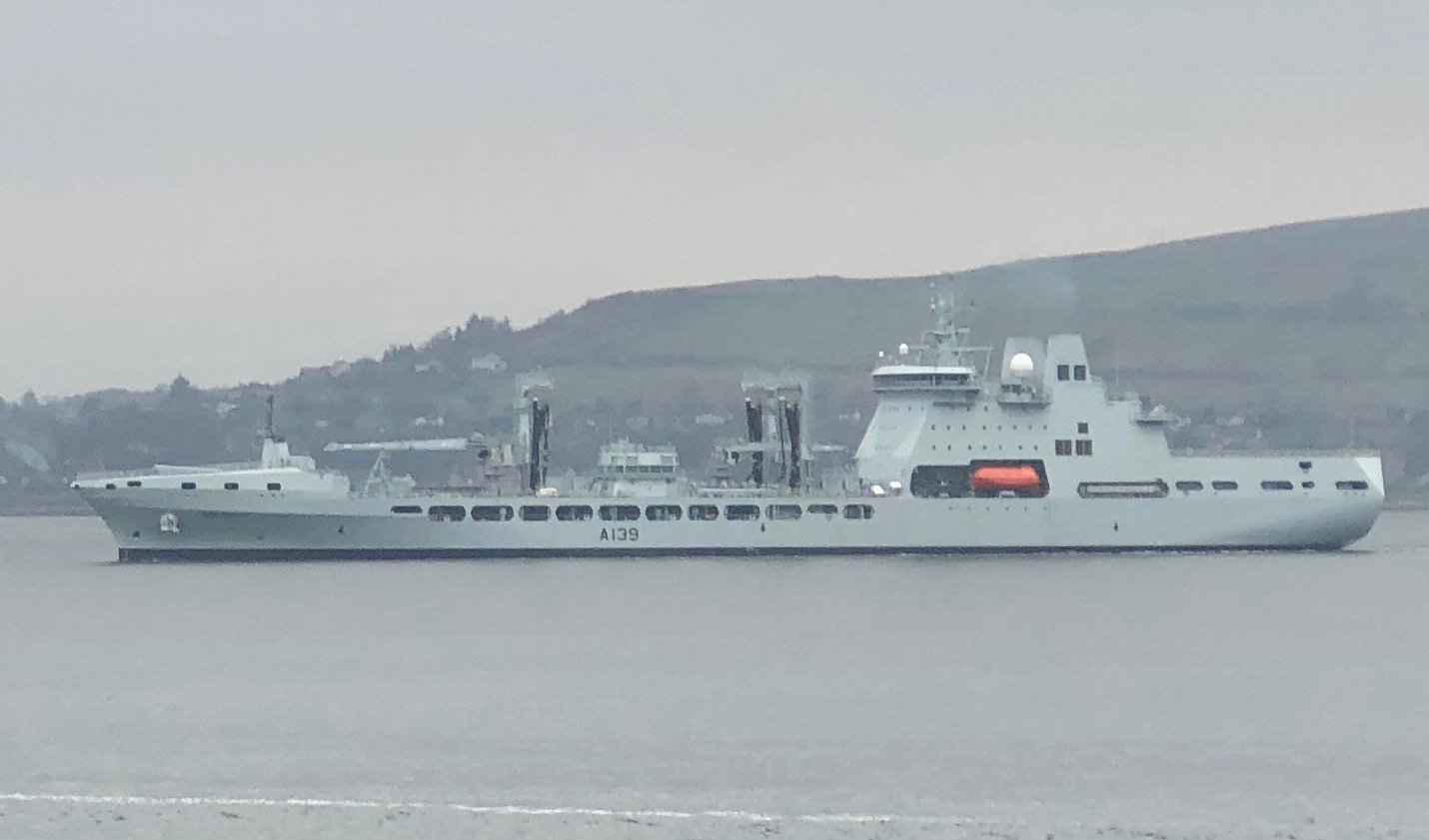
- RFA Tideforce on the Firth of Clyde on 28 February 2019.

History

United Kingdom
- Name: Tideforce
- Ordered: February 2012
- Builder: DSME
- Laid down: 24 December 2015
- Launched: 21 January 2017
- In service: 30 July 2019
- Home port: Marchwood Military Port, Southampton
- Identification: Pennant number: A139; IMO number: 9655561
- Motto: Raise on the 3/4
- Status: In active service
- Badge

General characteristics
- Class & type: Tide-class fast fleet tanker
- Displacement: 37,000 t (36,000 long tons)
- Length: 200.9 m (659 ft 1 in)
- Beam: 28.6 m (93 ft 10 in)
- Draft: 10 m (32 ft 10 in)
- Propulsion: CODELOD
- Speed: 20 knots (37 km/h; 23 mph)
- Range: 18,200 nautical miles (33,700 km; 20,900 mi)
- Capacity: Tanks for diesel oil, aviation fuel (19.000 m³) and fresh water (1,400 m³); Lubrication oil stored in drums; Stowage for up to 8 ft × 20 ft containers
- Complement: 63 plus 46 non-crew embarked persons (Royal Marines, flight crew, trainees)
- Sensors & processing systems: Kelvin Hughes Integrated Bridge System; Servowatch IPMS System; 3 × SharpEye radar
- Armament: 2 × Phalanx CIWS (fitted for, depending on deployment); 2 × 30 mm cannons (fitted for, depending on deployment)
- Aircraft carried: 1 medium helicopter with full hangar facilities (Merlin / Wildcat), flight deck capable of landing Chinook-size helicopter

RFA Tideforce is a Tide-class replenishment tanker of the British Royal Fleet Auxiliary (RFA). Launched in 2017, the ship entered service with the RFA in 2019.

== Construction ==
Tideforce, along with her three sister ships, was built by DSME in South Korea. As the fourth and final Tide-class vessel, her steel was first cut on 2 December 2015 prior to being laid down on 24 December 2015. Around nine months later, the ship was fully assembled and floated out by 12 September 2016. A series of builder's sea trials subsequently commenced and, in June 2018, the ship left South Korea for delivery to the United Kingdom via San Diego and the Panama Canal. The ship arrived in Falmouth for fitting out on 22 August 2018. This involved the installation of communications equipment, defensive systems, a floating helipad and refueling rigs. Following fitting out, the ship carried out capability assessment trials, replenishment at sea (RAS) trials and first-of-class flying trials. Her first RAS was carried out with RFA Fort Victoria off the Isle of Portland and a RAS with her sister ship RFA Tidesurge occurred shortly thereafter. In July 2019, she achieved further milestones, carrying out her first RAS with the aircraft carrier HMS Queen Elizabeth, as well as her first RAS with a foreign vessel, HNLMS Friesland of the Royal Netherlands Navy.

== Operational history ==
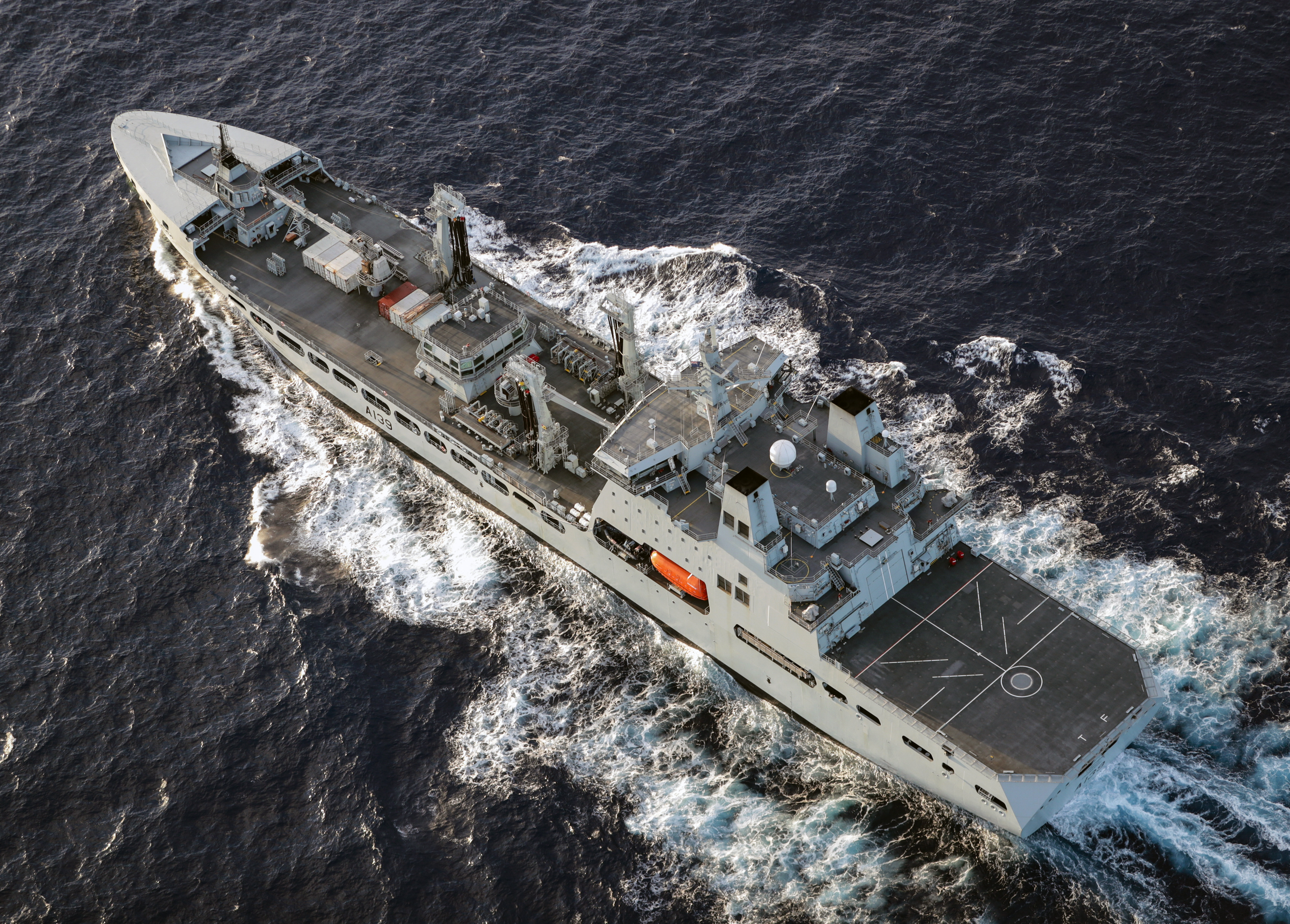
Tideforce during Exercise Westlant 18

Tideforce entered service with the Royal Fleet Auxiliary on 30 July 2019, the last of her class to do so following sister ships Tidespring, Tiderace and Tidesurge. In September, the ship joined the UK Carrier Strike Group on its three-month Westlant 19 deployment to the United States.

In August 2020, Tideforce rendezvoused with Standing NATO Maritime Group 1 to provide replenishment. In March, whilst conducting aviation training off the Devon and Dorset coast, Tideforce responded to an emergency call from a Dutch-flagged ship and provided assistance to an injured sailor. During the same month, the ship joined eight UK naval ships in responding to seven Russian vessels near British waters. In June, the ship carried out the first night time replenishment at sea with a Queen Elizabeth-class aircraft carrier.

In October 2022, Tideforce, with Wildcat helicopter embarked, was deployed to the Turks and Caicos islands to provide surveillance support to the Royal Turks and Caicos Islands Police Force which was confronted with rising gang violence in the territory.

In July 2023, Tideforce conducted replenishment-at-sea exercises with MV Raleigh Fisher, a merchant navy vessel on contract to the MoD. The purpose of the exercise was to trial replenishment-at-sea capabilities with merchant navy ships. In September 2023, Tideforce was tasked to escort HMS Queen Elizabeth during her "Operation FIREDRAKE" deployment in northern European waters.

In October 2024, it was reported that she was docked, though available to deploy in an emergency, primarily due to the shortage of sailors in the RFA.

In November 2024, she supported HMS Iron Duke in monitoring two groups of Russian vessels passing through the English Channel. The Russian ships included the newly commissioned Admiral Gorshkov-class frigate Admiral Golovko and Russian seabed spy ship Yantar. Yantar has likely been primarily engaged in information gathering, charting the location and vulnerabilities of cables and other undersea energy infrastructure should they wish to interfere with them in the future.

In January 2026, she provided support to US vessels in the pursuit and capture of Marinera (previously Bella 1), a Russian-flagged oil tanker, as part of Operation Southern Spear.

== See also ==
- List of replenishment ships of the Royal Fleet Auxiliary
