= Marchwood Military Port =

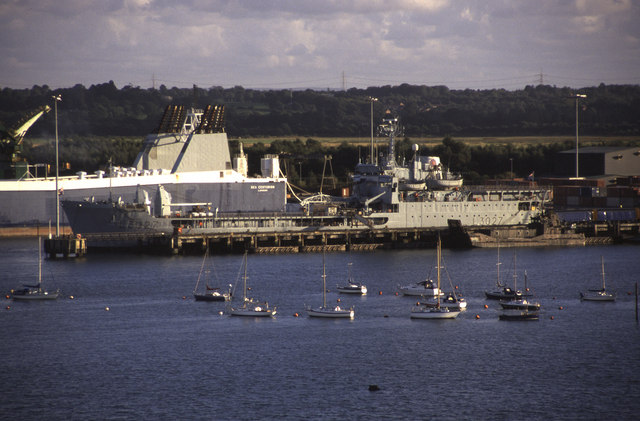
- Marchwood Military Port.

Location
- Country: UK
- Location: Marchwood, Southampton
- Coordinates: 50°53′36″N 1°25′20″W

Details
- Opened: 1943
- Operated by: Associated British Ports
- Owned by: HM Government
- Employees: 150 civilian 600 military

Marchwood Military Port (MMP) or Marchwood Sea Mounting Centre (SMC) is a military port located in Marchwood, Southampton on the south coast of the UK, and the base of 17 Port & Maritime Regiment Royal Logistic Corps. The port was built in 1943 to aid in the D-Day assault on Normandy in 1944 and has since been used to support the Falklands War. The port is now used largely by the Royal Fleet Auxiliary, as a base for their ships, including the Tide-class tankers, and it is also still employed for military cargo and personnel movement.

Marchwood is also the base-port for several Royal Fleet Auxiliary ships.

In August 2020, it was announced that the port would be converted to civilian use, with the Ministry of Defence retaining use of an element of the port.

== History ==
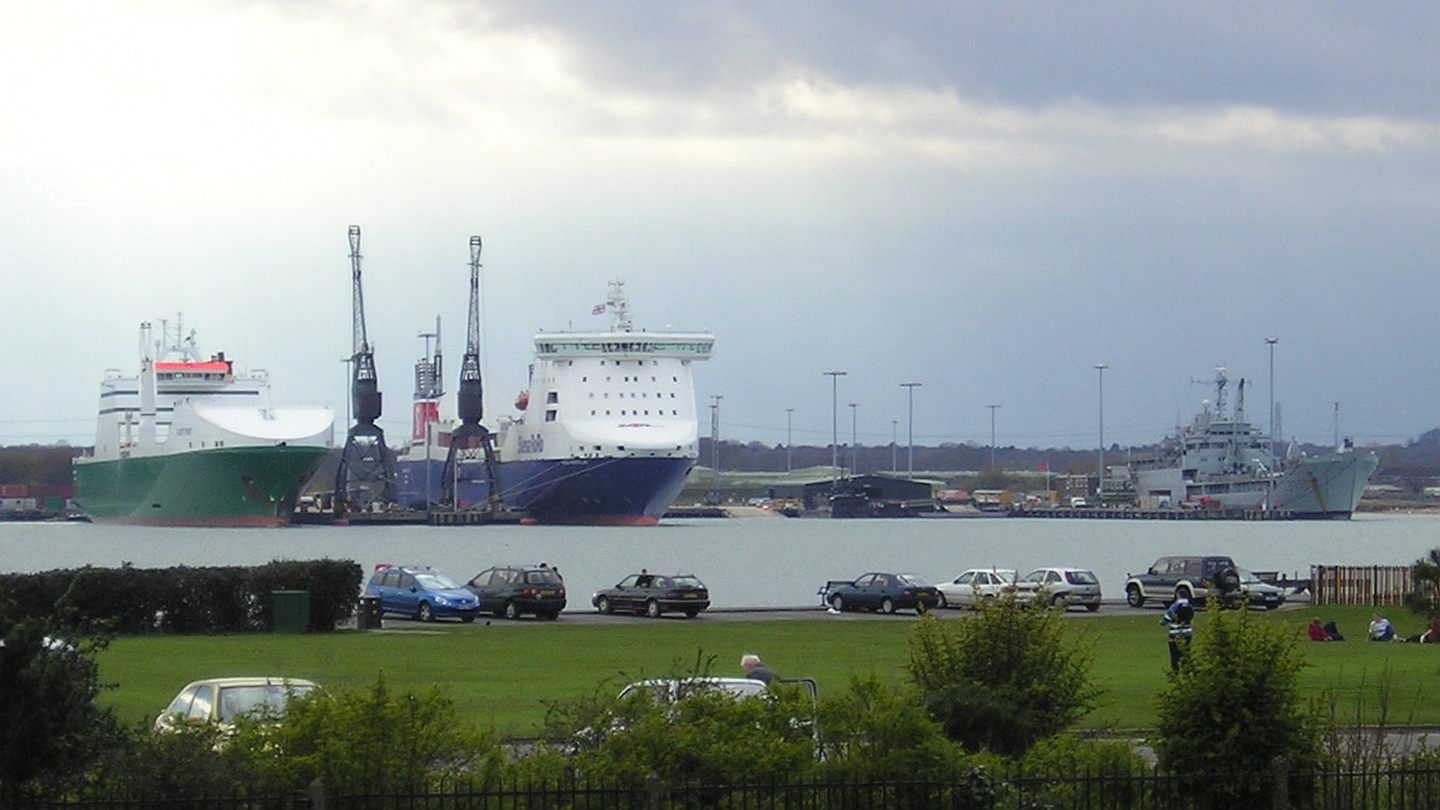
The port in 2004

The port was built in 1943 with the intent that it should be used to aid the Normandy landings in 1944 by shipping men and equipment across to the beaches; the port was also used to support the occupying forces following the success of the landings. At this time the port was relatively small, with just one jetty.

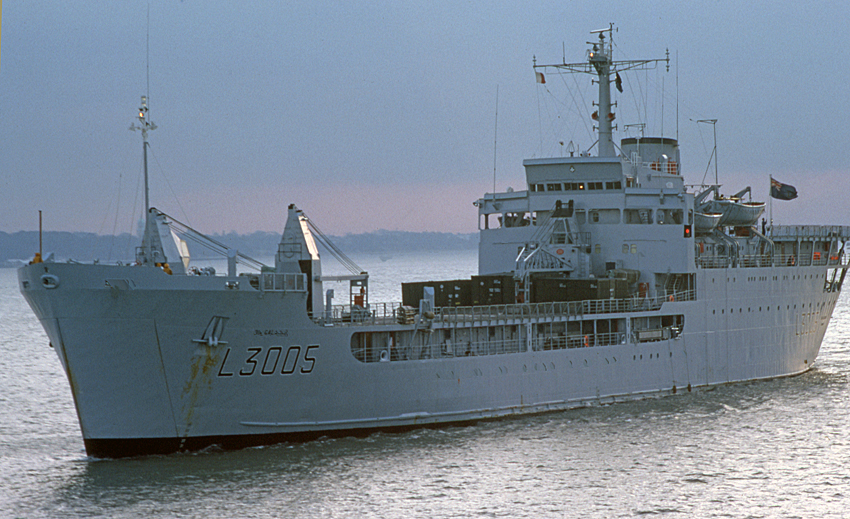
RFA Sir Galahad departing from Marchwood in 1979

The port again found use during the Falklands War, when it was employed to transport men and equipment to the Falkland Islands. The port aided Operation Corporate as a launching point for the Royal Fleet Auxiliaries Round Table class landing ships, armoured vehicles were also transported from Marchwood to the Europic Ferry via Mexeflote and then on to the Falklands. The port also became a massive assembly area for cargo and armoured vehicles which were subsequently forwarded to Southampton for transportation to the Falklands as required. At the conclusion of the war the port was used to receive 80 war dead, who were kept in the cargo shed, before being processed and returned to their families for funerals.

After the Falklands it became clear to the UK government that the base in Marchwood had been highly important in the war, and so the government spent £18 million on upgrading and improving the base, which only had a single jetty at the time. The Quartermaster General, appointed after the war, commented on the previous makeshift style of the port, saying that when he was assigned the job he was told to "get the Army some decent boots and sort out Marchwood", to which Major Robin Barton replied "At Marchwood, General, we are not too fussed about the boots".

The port was expanded considerably, with administration blocks being put in, as well as the Falklands deep water jetty, and training facilities. The water front is left clear for cargo and loading. The expansion of the port has become subject of a short documentary, meant for civil engineers.

In 2000 proposals were made to implement a separate, civilian, container port and access roads in close proximity to Marchwood. In a Parliamentary question, a Member of Parliament asked the Government whether the Ministry of Defence could accept such building works. The response was "yes," provided the Armed Forces' security and other requirements were taken into account, including in the planning process. The expansion has since been implemented.

The port is now used largely by the Royal Fleet Auxiliary, as a base for their ships, including their amphibious ships, but it is also still employed for military cargo and personnel movement.

In October 2010, it was reported that the port was to be sold to a private operator, but that no firm decision had been made regarding the future use of the port by the military.

In November 2015 the Ministry of Defence awarded Solent Gateway Ltd (SGL), a joint venture between the Scottish Government's David MacBrayne and logistics company GBA Group, a 35-year concession to operate the port from 2016 until 2051.

In August 2020, it was announced that the port would be converted to civilian use, with the Ministry of Defence retaining use of an element of the port.

In February 2023 the entire shareholding in operator SGL was acquired by Associated British Ports (ABP).

== Facilities ==
The site is named McMullen Barracks and the operating unit is 17 Port and Maritime Regiment, Royal Logistic Corps.

The port now consists of three main jetties. Falkland Jetty (berths 3 and 4), the largest, is 169 metres (554 ft) long and 33 metres (108 ft) wide, with two dolphins and is capable of accepting vessels up to 25,000 tonnes. It has two sophisticated class 100 ro-ro link span ramps facility capable of handling vessels with various ramp configurations. There are two 32 tonne cranes with container handling ability. Dolphins at the seaward end makes it easier for longer ships to use. The two berths are maintained to 8 metres (26 ft)+ (low water). Mulberry Jetty (berths 1 and 2), built during World War II, is 115 metres (377 ft) long, has rail access and is capable of accepting vessels of up to 8,000 tonnes with limited Ro/Ro facilities. It is named for the mulberry harbours used on the French coast for the post D-Day logistics. The berths are maintained at 4 metres (13 ft). Gunwharf Jetty (berths 5 and 6) is a subsidiary jetty of 116 metres (381 ft) that is used to berth military landing craft and smaller vessels. The berths are maintained at 4 metres (13 ft) and 3 metres (9.8 ft) respectively. There is also a small ship maintenance facility with a boatlift rated at 225 tonnes. The Directorate of Land Service Ammunition (DLSA) has granted the port a licence to handle ammunition/explosives on the main jetty. The port has a limited capacity to handle containerised cargo within the 289-acre estate.

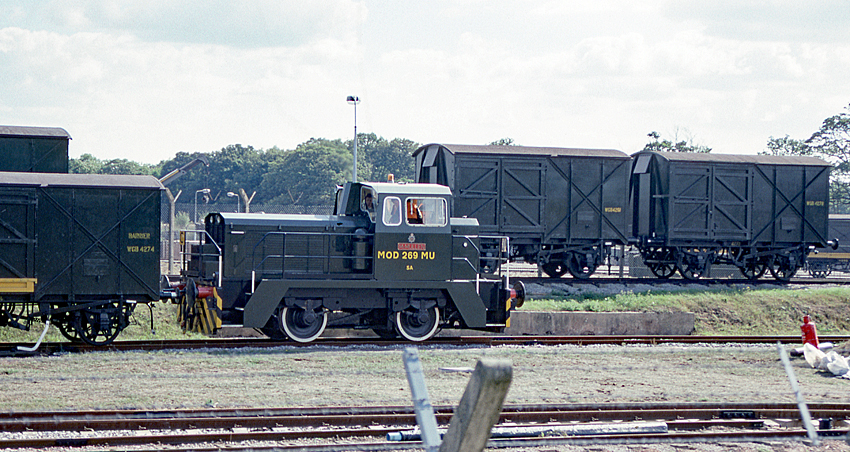
MOD 269 MU McMullen Army 0-4-0 diesel shunter

The base contains a small standard gauge diesel-powered railway network that transports freight and occasionally passengers around the site. It is connected to the national railway network via the Fawley branch line, allowing freight trains to access the port and is regularly used to transport military vehicles and materiel to and from the port.

== Based units ==
The following based units and ships are based at the port:

British Army

- 17 Port and Maritime Regiment, Royal Logistic Corps

Royal Fleet Auxiliary

- Fort Victoria-class replenishment oiler:
  - RFA Fort Victoria (A387) (in "reduced readiness" at Cammell Laird shipyard)
- Tide-class fast fleet tankers:
  - RFA Tidespring (A136)
  - RFA Tiderace (A137) (laid up in uncrewed reserve at Cammell Laird)
  - RFA Tidesurge (A138)
  - RFA Tideforce (A139)
