= RFA Tidespring (A136) =

2017 Tide-class replenishment tanker of the Royal Fleet Auxiliary

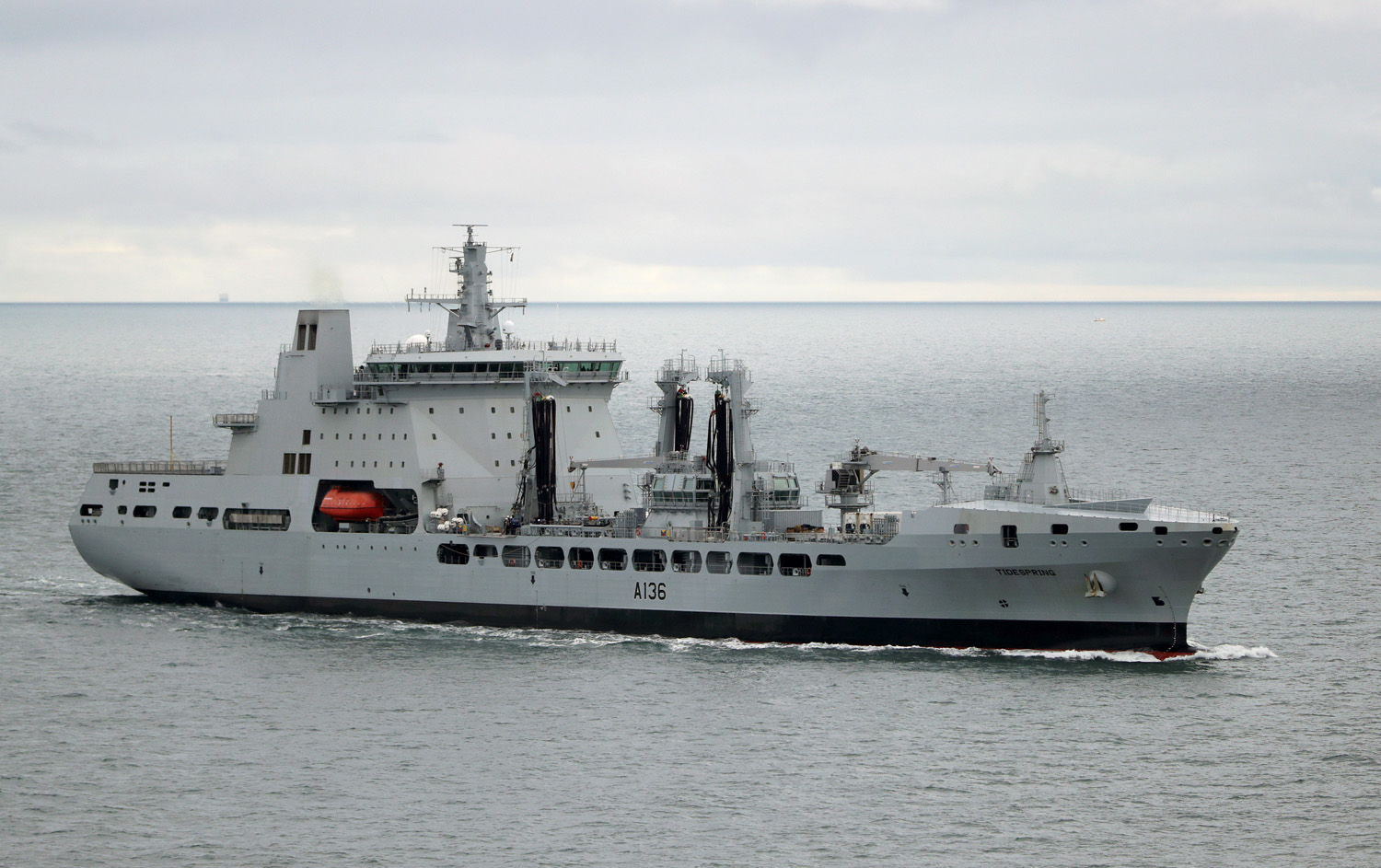
- RFA Tidespring

History

United Kingdom
- Name: RFA Tidespring
- Namesake: RFA Tidespring
- Ordered: February 2012
- Builder: DSME
- Laid down: December 2014
- Launched: April 2015
- In service: 27 November 2017
- Home port: Marchwood Military Port, Southampton
- Identification: Pennant number: A136; IMO number: 9655535; MMSI number: 235109357; International call sign: GXRG
- Status: In service
- Badge

General characteristics
- Class & type: Tide-class fast fleet tanker
- Displacement: 37,000 t (36,000 long tons)
- Length: 200.9 m (659 ft 1 in)
- Beam: 28.6 m (93 ft 10 in)
- Draft: 10 m (32 ft 10 in)
- Propulsion: CODELOD
- Speed: 20 knots (37 km/h; 23 mph)
- Range: 18,200 nautical miles (33,700 km; 20,900 mi)
- Capacity: Tanks for diesel oil, aviation fuel (19,000 m³) and fresh water (1,400 m³); Lubrication oil stored in drums; Stowage for up to 8 ft × 20 ft containers
- Complement: 63 plus 46 non-crew embarked persons (Royal Marines, flight crew, trainees)
- Sensors & processing systems: Kelvin Hughes Integrated Bridge System; Servowatch IPMS System; 3 × SharpEye radar
- Armament: 2 × Phalanx CIWS (fitted for, depending on deployment); 2 × 30 mm cannons (fitted for, depending on deployment)
- Aircraft carried: 1 medium helicopter with full hangar facilities (Merlin / Wildcat), flight deck capable of landing Chinook-size helicopter

RFA Tidespring is a Tide-class replenishment tanker of the British Royal Fleet Auxiliary (RFA). Built by DSME in 2016, the ship entered service with the Royal Fleet Auxiliary in November 2017.

== Construction ==
The construction of Tidespring was carried out by DSME in South Korea with her steel first being cut by RFA Commodore Rob Dorey on 24 June 2014. The ship was laid down on 22 December 2014 and launched four months later on 25 April 2015. A series of builders sea trials commenced from 29 March 2015 and were completed by 1 July 2016. The finalisation of electrical elements and the installation of Multi-Cable Transit insulation, as per new legislative regulations, caused a delay in the ship's delivery to the UK. On 5 February 2017, the ship departed South Korea for delivery to the UK, making stopovers at Yokosuka, Japan and Pearl Harbor, Hawaii. The ship transited the Panama Canal into the Atlantic Ocean and arrived in Falmouth, England on 31 March 2017. The ship was drydocked in Falmouth Docks for fitting out to be carried out by A&P Group on 27 April 2017. On 10 May 2017, a crane collapsed beside the ship whilst she was drydocked, however the vessel was not damaged in the incident.

Tidespring sailed from Falmouth for final evaluation trials on 1 September 2017 which included her first visit to Gibraltar, first of class flying trials and her first replenishment at sea (RAS) with RFA Wave Knight. She was officially accepted into the RFA on 27 November 2017.

== Operational history ==
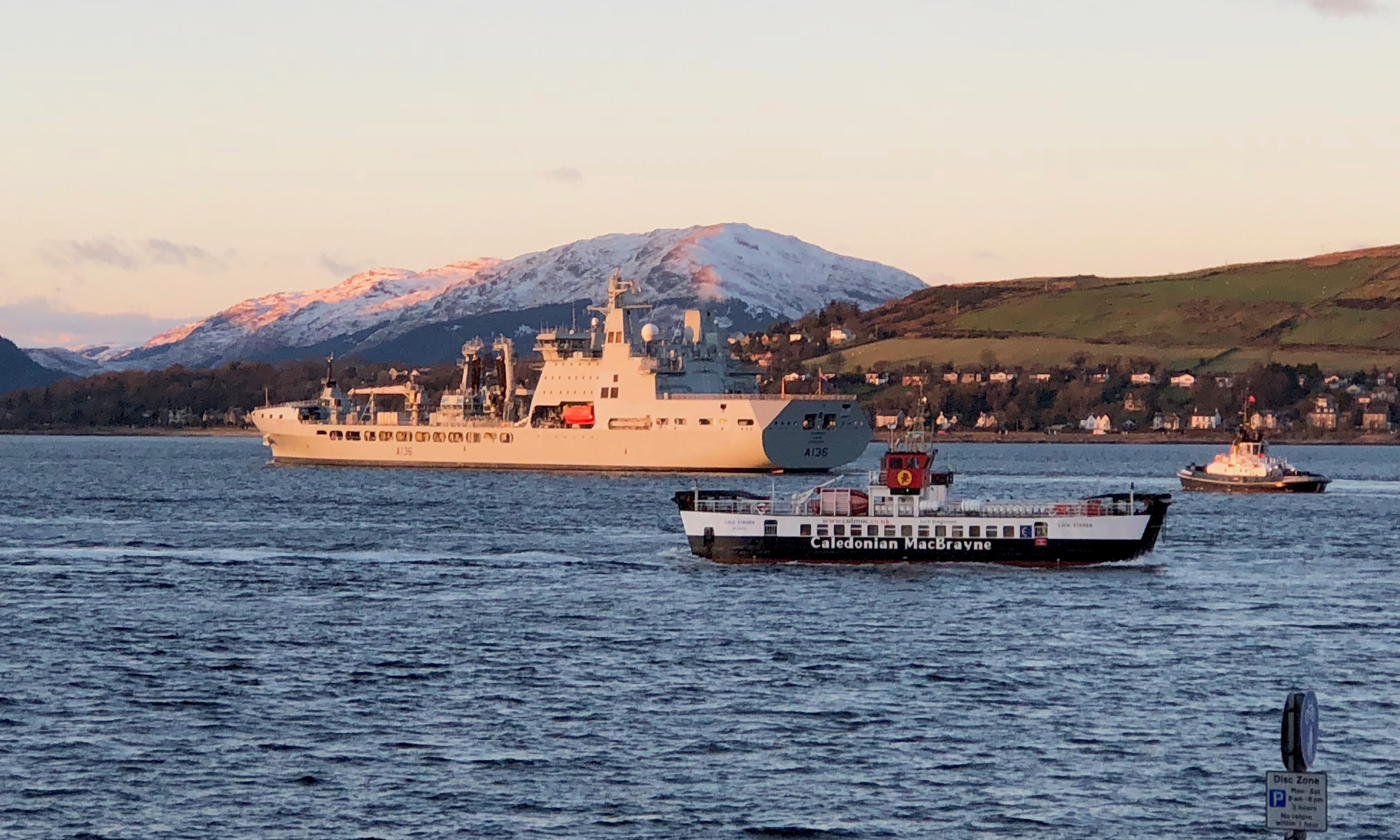
December 2017: RFA Tidespring in the Firth of Clyde, with the ferry Loch Striven passing by.

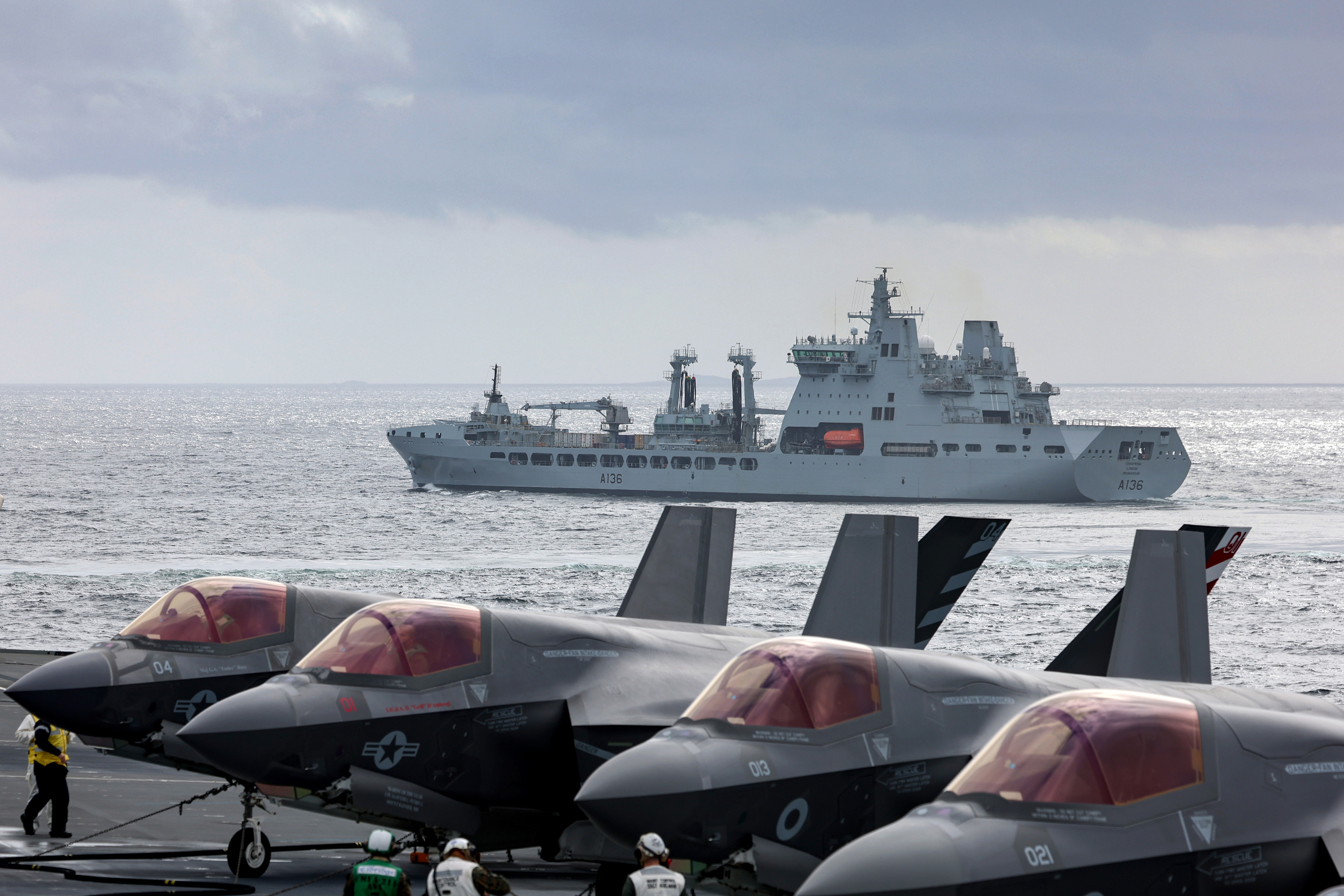
Tidespring passing HMS Queen Elizabeth in May 2021

The ship's first scheduled replenishment at sea was planned to be with HMS Queen Elizabeth on 26 February 2018, however the full procedure — which was the first ever RAS for both ships — had to be abandoned due to bad weather. Tidespring and Queen Elizabeth instead carried out a full simulation of the scenario. In April, the ship participated in the bi-annual Exercise Joint Warrior, a large-scale NATO military exercise held off the coast of Scotland.

The ship underwent a maintenance refit at Cammell Laird's shipyard in Birkenhead in March 2019. A year later, the ship was involved in the largest Royal Navy response to a fleet of Russian warships in the North Sea. In September 2020, the ship accompanied HMS Sutherland during sea drills in the Barents Sea alongside ships of the Danish, Norwegian and American navies. In 2025, RFA Tidespring, embarking a Merlin HC2 helicopter of 814 Squadron and Puma UAVs from 700 Squadron, joined the Royal Navy's carrier strike group as part of Operation HIGHMAST in a deployment to the Indo-Pacific region. While the main body of the task group sailed to the Indian Ocean through the Mediterranean and the Suez Canal, Tidespring herself sailed around the Cape of Good Hope.

Tidespring, as part of the UK strike group, along with HMS Prince of Wales (R09), HMS Richmond (F239), HNoMS Roald Amundsen (F311) of the Royal Norwegian Navy and JS Akebono (DD-108) of the Japan Maritime Self-Defense Force, took part in Exercise Konkan 2025, a bilateral and biennial maritime exercise conducted the Royal Navy and the Indian Navy, between 5 and 8 October 2025. The Indian Navy was represented by INS Vikrant and its Carrier Battle Group (CBG), consisting of INS Kolkata (D63), INS Mormugao (D67), INS Surat (D69), INS Tabar (F44), INS Teg (F45) and INS Deepak (A50). This is the maiden instance of a dual carrier operation between the countries. On 8 October, the Indian Air Force deployed its Su-30MKI and Jaguar aircraft for a one-day exercise with the group. Following the conclusion of the exercise, Richmond and Prince of Wales conduct a port call at Indira Dock, Mumbai and Goa, respectively. The visits coincided with the two-day visit of the UK Prime Minister, Keir Starmer, to India to meet the Indian Prime Minister, Narendra Modi, in Mumbai.

== See also ==
- List of replenishment ships of the Royal Fleet Auxiliary
