= HMS Richmond (F239) =

1995 Type 23 or Duke-class frigate of the Royal Navy

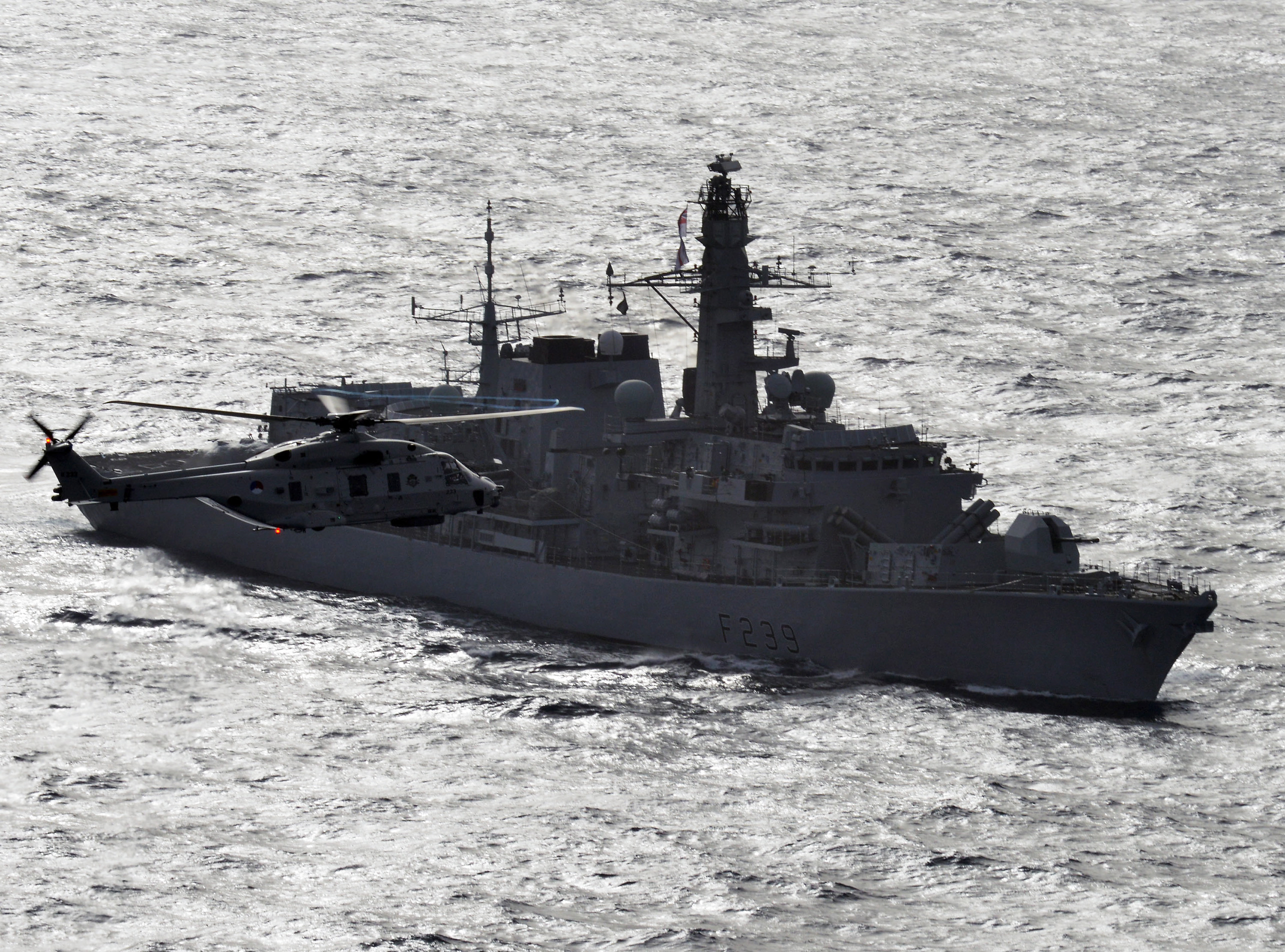
- HMS Richmond, 2013

History

United Kingdom
- Name: HMS Richmond
- Operator: Royal Navy
- Ordered: December 1989
- Builder: Swan Hunter, Tyne and Wear, United Kingdom
- Laid down: 16 February 1992
- Launched: 6 April 1993
- Sponsored by: Lady Hill-Norton
- Commissioned: 22 June 1995
- Out of service: 2026
- Refit: LIFEX 2017-2019
- Home port: HMNB Devonport, Plymouth
- Identification: IMO number: 8949678; MMSI number: 234630000; International call sign: GCOJ
- Motto: A Deo et Rege; ("From God and the King")
- Status: Out of service
- Badge

General characteristics
- Class & type: Type 23 Frigate
- Displacement: 4,900 t (4,800 long tons; 5,400 short tons)
- Length: 133 m (436 ft 4 in)
- Beam: 16.1 m (52 ft 10 in)
- Draught: 7.3 m (23 ft 11 in)
- Propulsion: CODLAG: Four 1,650 kilowatts (2,210 shp) MTU 12V4000 M53 diesel generators; Two GEC electric motors delivering 2980kW (4000 shp); Two Rolls-Royce Spey SM1C delivering 23,190 kW (31,100 shp)
- Speed: In excess of 28 kn (52 km/h; 32 mph)
- Range: 7,500 nautical miles (14,000 km) at 15 kn (28 km/h)
- Complement: 185 (accommodation for up to 205)
- Electronic warfare & decoys: UAF-1 ESM, or, UAT Mod 1; Seagnat; Type 182 towed torpedo decoy; Surface Ship Torpedo Defence
- Armament: Anti-air missiles: 1 × 32-cell GWS 35 Vertical Launching System (VLS) for: 32 × Sea Ceptor missiles (1–25+ km); Anti-ship missiles: 2 × quad Naval Strike Missile; Anti-submarine torpedoes: 2 × twin 12.75 in (324 mm) Sting Ray torpedo tubes; Guns: 1 × BAE 4.5 inch Mk 8 naval gun; 2 × 30 mm DS30M Mk2 guns, or, 2 × 30 mm DS30B guns; 2 × Miniguns (may be replaced by Browning .50 caliber heavy machine guns as of 2023); 4 × General-purpose machine gun
- Aircraft carried: 1 × Wildcat HMA2, armed with: 4 × Sea Venom anti-ship missiles (initial operating capability from October 2025; full operating capability projected from 2026), or, 2 × Sting Ray anti-submarine torpedoes, or; 20 × Martlet multirole missiles (from 2021); Mk 11 depth charges; or; 1 × Westland Merlin HM2, armed with; 4 × anti submarine torpedoes
- Aviation facilities: Flight deck; Enclosed hangar

HMS Richmond was a Type 23 frigate of the Royal Navy that was formally withdrawn from service in 2026. She was launched on 6 April 1993 by Lady Hill-Norton, wife of the late Admiral of the Fleet The Lord Hill-Norton, and was the last warship to be built by Swan Hunter Shipbuilders. She sailed from the builders on the River Tyne in November 1994. She was named for the Dukedom of Richmond.

== Operational history ==
=== 1995–2000 ===
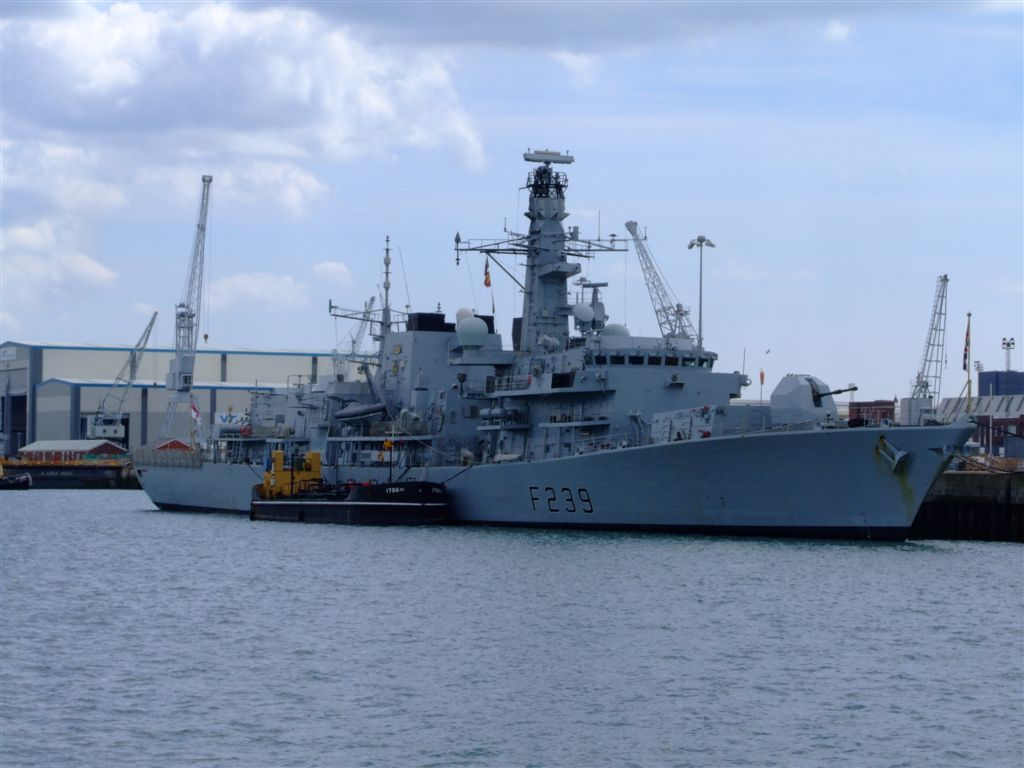
HMS Richmond in Portsmouth Naval Base

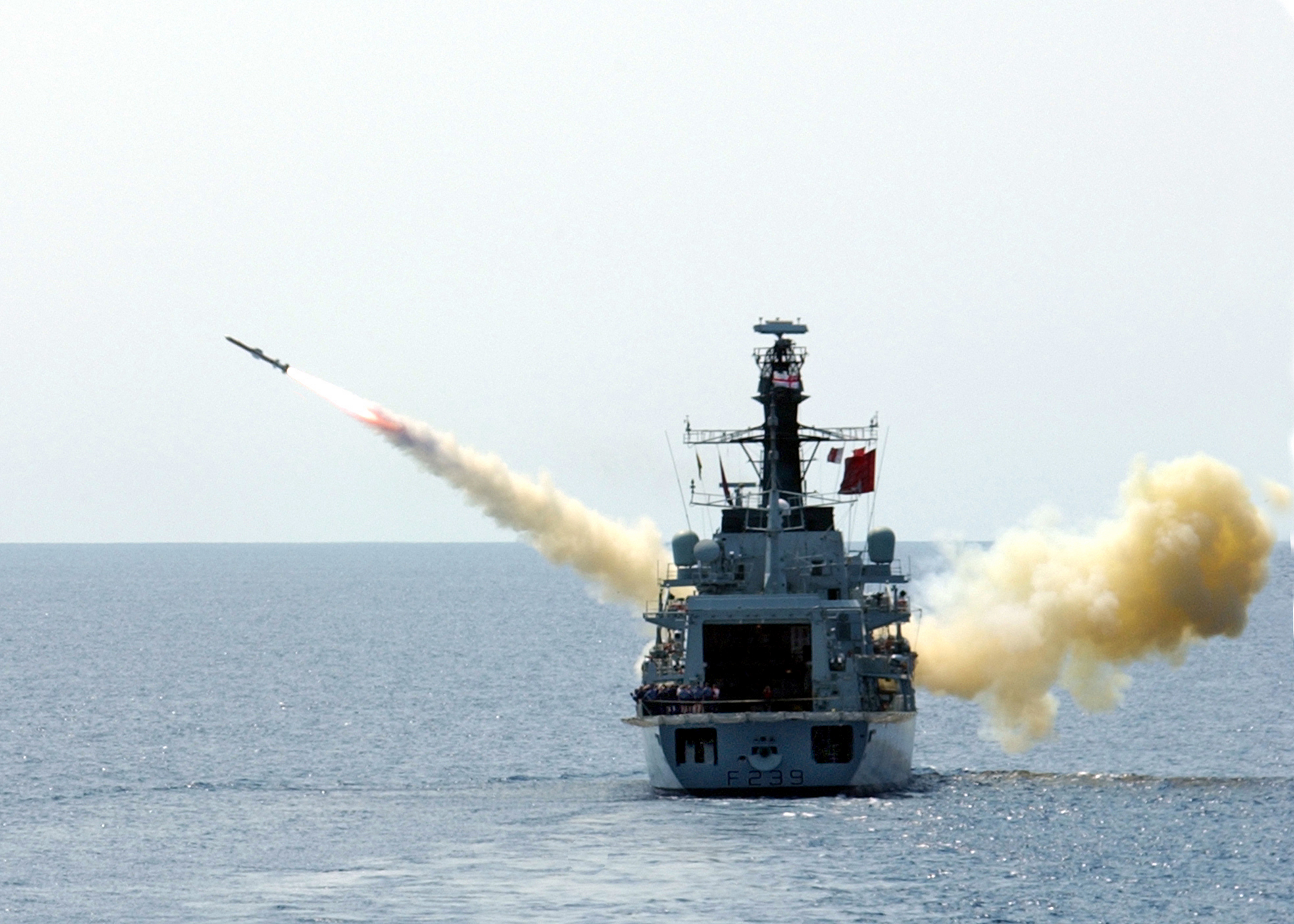
Richmond launching an AGM-84 Harpoon missile

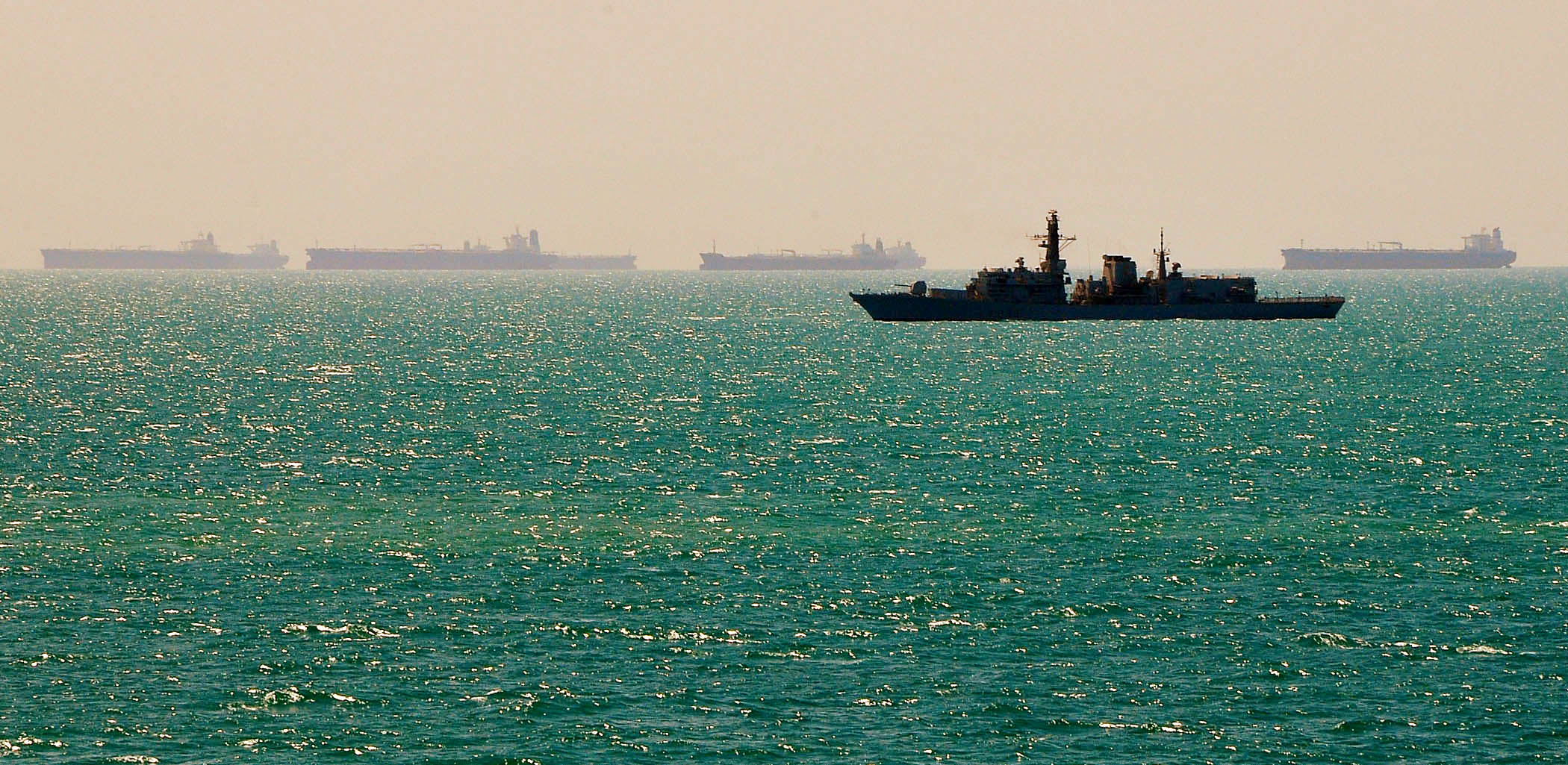
Richmond patrolling near the Al Basra Oil Terminal, Iraq

Richmond was first deployed in 1997 to the Far East as part of the 'Ocean Wave 97' Task Group. One of the most interesting visits she made was to the Russian port of Vladivostok, an important Russian naval base, where she became the first Royal Navy vessel to visit in over 100 years. Also that year Richmond escorted the royal yacht HMY Britannia on the ship's final leg of her final tour of the United Kingdom prior to her decommissioning.

In 1998 Richmond participated in two significant NATO naval exercises and arrived in New York where she was involved in the US Navy Fleet Week. In 1999 Richmond was dispatched to the South Atlantic as part of Atlantic Patrol Task (South) and underwent a major overhaul which concluded in 2000.

=== 2001–2010 ===
In 2001 Richmond joined the NATO multi-national squadron Standing Naval Force Mediterranean. In 2002 she arrived in the Caribbean where she performed tasks including obligatory "fly-the-flag" duties to the Commonwealth countries in the region as well as undergoing trials. In June 2002, two officers were killed when Richmond's Lynx helicopter crashed off the coast of Virginia.

In 2003 she deployed to the Persian Gulf on Armilla Patrol where she relieved HMS Cardiff. She had arrived shortly before the 2003 Iraq War. When hostilities began, Richmond, HM ships Chatham, Marlborough and HMAS Anzac of the Royal Australian Navy provided Naval Gunfire Support (NGS) during the Royal Marines' amphibious assault of the Al Faw Peninsula, the first amphibious assault by the Marines since the Falklands War in 1982. Richmond remained in the region at the war's end and returned home in August.

In July 2004 Richmond deployed on Atlantic Patrol Task (North), which encompasses the Atlantic and Caribbean regions. Two of the ports she visited early in the deployment were Jamaica and Belize. In September Richmond came to the assistance of the Turks and Caicos Islands when they were struck by Hurricane Frances. Turks and Caicos suffered only minimal damage to buildings. Richmond then sailed to Curaçao, Netherlands Antilles where she resumed her maintenance period, which had been interrupted due to the hurricane, but remained on standby to provide assistance due to the imminent arrival of Hurricane Ivan.

Hurricane Ivan eventually hit the region, causing significant damage and fatalities, particularly inflicting enormous damage and a number of fatalities to Grenada, which included immense damage to the capital St. George's. Richmond and her accompanying Royal Fleet Auxiliary vessel Wave Ruler came to the assistance of the island. The extent of the damage in Grenada reached such levels that Keith Mitchell, Prime Minister of Grenada, was forced to relocate to Richmond after his residence was destroyed by the hurricane. The Prime Minister effectively ran his country from Richmond for several hours.

Her crew having performed vital assistance on land at Grenada, Richmond steamed at her top speed for Jamaica and the Cayman Islands to assist those territories in recovering from the ravages of Hurricane Ivan.

Richmond returned from her deployment in December 2004, and began a refit period at HM Naval Base Portsmouth in mid-2005. The refit, undertaken by Fleet Support Limited, was completed in late 2006 and Richmond was returned to the operational fleet in October 2006. With 44 major upgrades to her sensor and weapon systems, Richmond was at that time one of the most capable Type 23 frigates. From 5 to 12 July 2010 she anchored beside HMS Belfast in London to foster the ship's relations with the Borough of Richmond-upon-Thames.

=== 2011–2019 ===
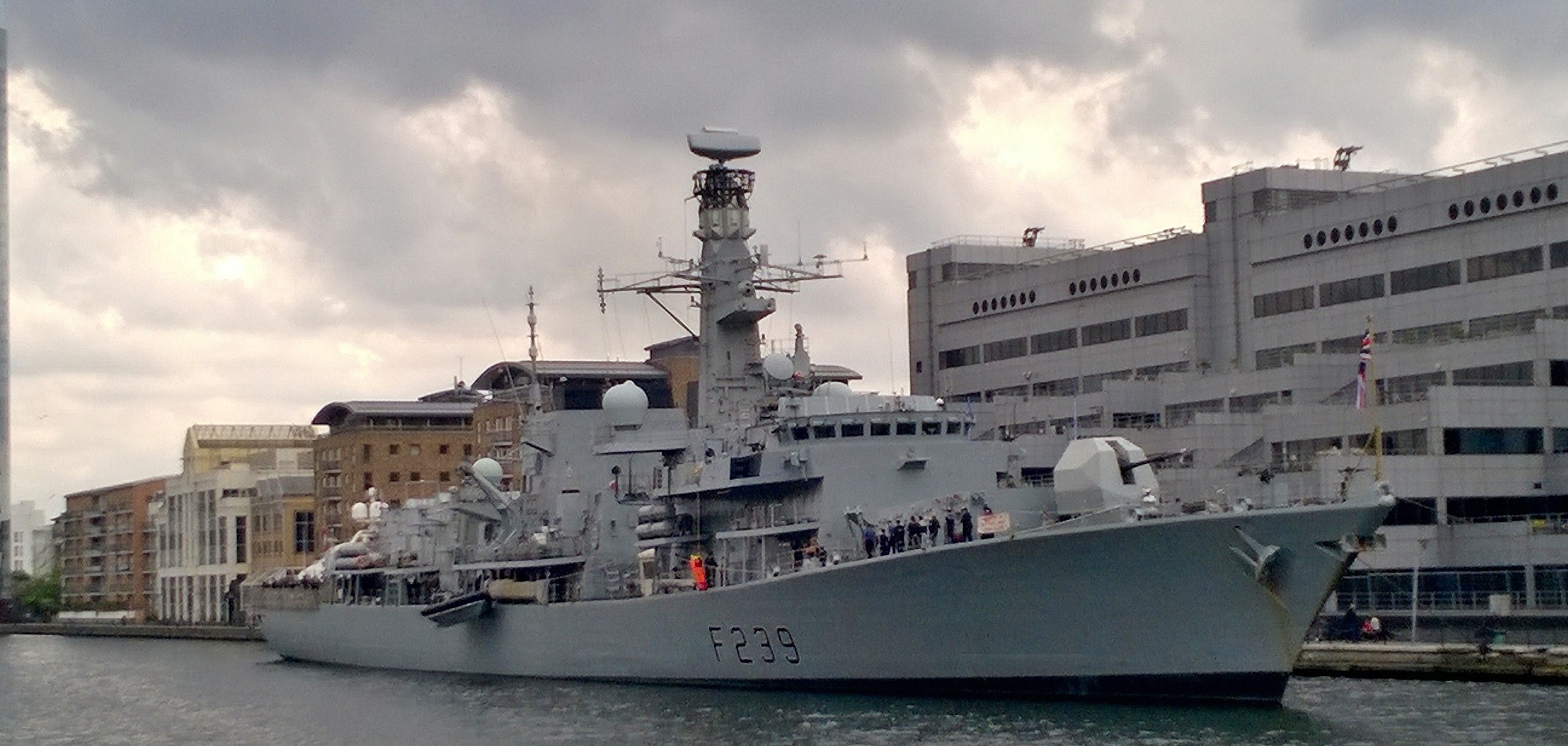
HMS Richmond moored at South Quay in London in 2017

In 2011, she deployed to the Middle East and the Asia-Pacific region, the latter for upcoming Five Power Defence Arrangement exercises, specifically Exercise Bersama Shield 11. She assisted with anti-piracy operations with the EU Naval Force and was also a participant in the IMEX Asia 2011. After Singapore, she rendered honours to the fallen of Force Z (see the Sinking of Prince of Wales and Repulse). She took part in exercise FRUKUS 2011 with ships from the United States Navy and Russian Navy.

In early August 2013, she deployed as the Royal Navy's Atlantic Patrol South where she carried out Maritime Security Patrols in the Falkland Islands. HMS Richmond returned to the UK in February 2014. This deployment involved high-profile defence engagement visits to five continents and resulted in the ship receiving Commander British Forces South Atlantic Islands Commendation for Distinguished Service. Of note, during her seven months away Richmond conducted visits to five British Dependent Overseas Territories including Ascension Island, St Helena, the Falklands, South Georgia and Tristan da Cunha. During this deployment Richmond became the first Royal Navy warship to transit the Panama Canal in its centenary year.

In October 2015 Richmond was deployed to the Mediterranean to aid the EU's fight against people smugglers due to refugees fleeing civil war in Syria. She returned to her home port on 11 December 2015.

In October 2016 Richmond and the destroyer HMS Duncan were dispatched by the Ministry of Defence to intercept and "man-mark" a fleet of Russian Navy vessels, including their flagship Admiral Kuznetsov passing through the English Channel on their way to Syria.

On 6 January 2017, Richmond featured in Series 1, episode 9 of The Grand Tour. The ship and her weaponry star in a sequence where James May and Jeremy Clarkson commandeer the 4.5-inch Mark 8 naval gun to destroy an armoured vehicle manufactured by Richard Hammond. In June 2017, Richmond docked at Chatham on the Medway to mark 350 years since the Raid on the Medway. Richmond entered refit at Devonport in the late summer of 2017. In November it was announced that on completion of the work in 2018 she will not return to Portsmouth and will switch base port to Plymouth in an effort to concentrate the Type 23s fitted with anti-submarine equipment in the city. The refit saw the ship become the first Type 23 to be fitted with MTU M53B diesel generators - these will be fitted to the remainder of the class (except Argyll and Lancaster), as well as the Type 26.

=== 2020–2026 ===
In February 2020, Richmond went to sea to for post-refit tests. These included the new PGMU propulsion system (MTU M53B generators) and the new Sea Ceptor air defence system, replacing the 1970s Sea Wolf system.

The ship deployed as part of United Kingdom Carrier Strike Group 21, alongside sister ship HMS Kent, travelling from the UK to Gibraltar, the Suez Canal, and the South China Sea in 2021.

In early September 2022, Richmond along with sister ships HMS Westminster and HMS Lancaster tracked the Russian cruiser Marshal Ustinov, Russian destroyer Vice-Admiral Kulakov and the tanker Vyazma as they sailed near UK waters. In 2022, Richmond spent 145 days at sea.

In January 2024 Richmond was sent to the Red Sea to join destroyer HMS Diamond and sister-frigate HMS Lancaster in defending against attacks on commercial shipping by Iranian-backed Houthi rebels based in Yemen, and on 9 March 2024 the Secretary of State for Defence announced that Richmond had successfully intercepted two attack drones out of a swarm of 28, the first combat success of the Sea Ceptor air defence system.

In March 2025, Richmond became the third Royal Navy warship to receive a complement of Naval Strike Missiles which will serve in the anti-ship missile role but also have a land-attack capability. In 2025, the frigate joined the Royal Navy's carrier strike group as part of Operation HIGHMAST in a deployment to the Indo-Pacific region. In August 2025, some debate erupted over whether to send Richmond through the Taiwan Strait during her deployment to the Far East. On September 12, she passed through the Taiwan Strait in company with the USS Higgins.

Richmond, as part of the UK strike group, along with HMS Prince of Wales, RFA Tidespring, HNoMS Roald Amundsen of the Royal Norwegian Navy and JS Akebono of the Japan Maritime Self-Defense Force, took part in Exercise Konkan 2025, a bilateral and biennial maritime exercise conducted the Royal Navy and the Indian Navy, between 5 and 8 October 2025. The Indian Navy was represented by INS Vikrant and its Carrier Battle Group (CBG), consisting of INS Kolkata, INS Mormugao, INS Surat, INS Tabar, INS Teg and INS Deepak. This is the maiden instance of a dual carrier operation between the countries. On 8 October, the Indian Air Force deployed its Su-30MKI and Jaguar aircraft for a one-day exercise with the group. Following the conclusion of the exercise, Richmond and Prince of Wales conduct a port call at Indira Dock, Mumbai and Goa, respectively. The visits coincided with the two-day visit of the UK Prime Minister, Keir Starmer, to India to meet the Indian Prime Minister, Narendra Modi, in Mumbai.

The exercise included an aerial exercise conducted between Royal Air Force's F-35B and Vikrant's MiG-29K fleet. This was followed by a combined submarined hunt operation which included Royal Navy Merlin Mk2 helicopters operating from Prince of Wales and Richmond and Indian Navy P-8I Neptune aircraft trying to detect an Indian submarine.

In September 2025, Richmond was deployed in Japan to monitor sanctions compliance against North Korea.

On 23 January 2026 it was reported that she would be decommissioned by the end of the year. In July 2026, the Royal Navy announced that she had been effectively withdrawn from service.

== Affiliations ==
- His Grace, The Duke of Richmond and Gordon
- The Yorkshire Regiment (14th/15th, 19th and 33rd/76th Foot)
- Worshipful Company of Basketmakers
- Town of Richmond
- Richmond upon Thames
- London Nautical School

== See also ==
- HMS Richmond helicopter crash
