= INS Deepak =

Fleet tanker of the Indian Navy

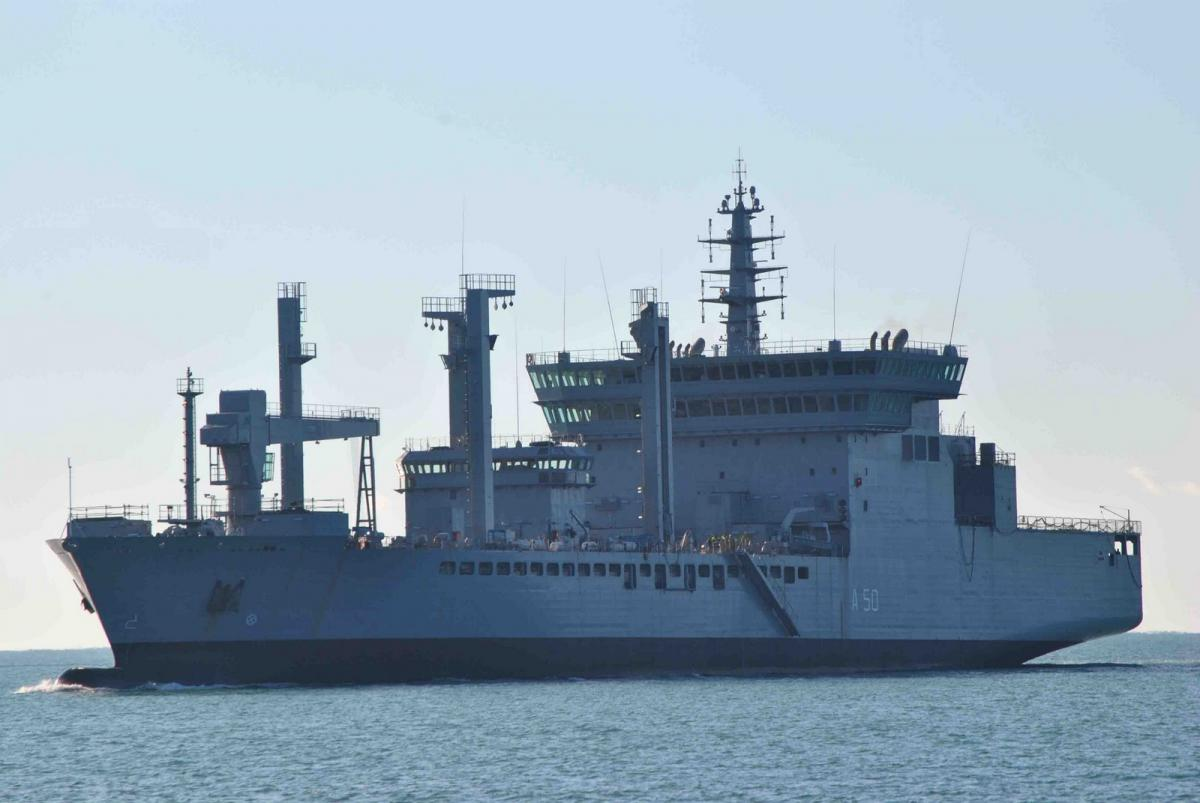
- INS Deepak

History

India
- Name: Deepak
- Namesake: Oil lamp
- Builder: Fincantieri
- Yard number: 6186
- Launched: 13 February 2010
- Commissioned: 21 January 2011
- Identification: IMO number: 9601950; MMSI number: 419095100; Callsign: AVDL
- Motto: Anything, Anywhere
- Status: Active

General characteristics
- Class & type: Deepak-class fleet tanker
- Displacement: 19,150 t (18,850 long tons) (light); 27,000 t (27,000 long tons) (maximum)
- Length: 175 m (574 ft 2 in)
- Beam: 25 m (82 ft 0 in)
- Draft: 9.1 m (29 ft 10 in) (Maximum)
- Depth: 19.3 m (63 ft 4 in)
- Decks: 10
- Installed power: 2 x MAN diesel engines, 18.6 MW (24,900 hp)
- Propulsion: Single shaft; controllable-pitch propeller
- Speed: 20 knots (37 km/h; 23 mph)
- Endurance: 10,000 nmi (19,000 km; 12,000 mi) at 20 knots (37 km/h; 23 mph)
- Complement: 248; 180 ratings and 20 officers

INS Deepak is a Deepak-class fleet tanker of the Indian Navy built by Fincantieri. Deepak was launched on 13 February 2010 and commissioned on 21 January 2011.

== Design and description ==
=== Capacity ===
The Deepak-class tanker can carry 17,900 tonnes (17,600 long tons; 19,700 short tons) of cargo, including 15,500 tonnes (15,300 long tons; 17,100 short tons) tons of liquid cargo (water, ship and aircraft fuel) and 500 tonnes (490 long tons; 550 short tons) tons of solid cargo (victuals and ammunition). The vessel can handle 16 cargo containers on the upper deck and was equipped with an eight-bed hospital, with laboratory and X-ray facilities. The modern cargo handling facility on board the ship enables transfer of heavy solid cargo via a 30-tonne (30-long-ton; 33-short-ton) capacity deck crane, and simultaneous fueling of multiple ships at sea, and can refuel at the rate of 1,500 tonnes (1,500 long tons; 1,700 short tons) per hour. Deepak can refuel four ships at the same time. Workshop facilities on the ship can support other ships of the fleet and it is capable of supporting heavy helicopters.

== Construction ==
Deepak was delivered within a record 27 months. There were allegations of the then ruling UPA government having engaged in corruption by allowing Fincantieri to build Shakti (Deepak's sister ship) and Deepak using commercial grade steel, instead of military grade steel as per the norm. The Comptroller and Auditor General of India (CAG) questioned in 2010 why the order was not given to Rosoboronexport, which had offered to use military grade steel for the construction of the tankers. The CAG also questioned the excess supply of spare parts worth $6 million (equivalent to $8,383,336 in 2023), and the inadequate purchases from Indian industry. The two tankers cost $200 million (equivalent to $279,444,529 in 2023). Fincantieri reportedly used DH-36 civilian grade steel instead of the DMR-249A military grade steel as stipulated. India Today reported that the Defense Minister of the succeeding government, Manohar Parrikar, had ordered a probe into the matter. The Defence Ministry issued a press release the next day, clarifying that no probe had been ordered, and that steel of an inferior quality had not been used, but did not clarify why military grade steel was not used. The same day, Kirit Somaiya, an MP on the Public Accounts Committee, demanded a probe into the matter.

== Service history ==
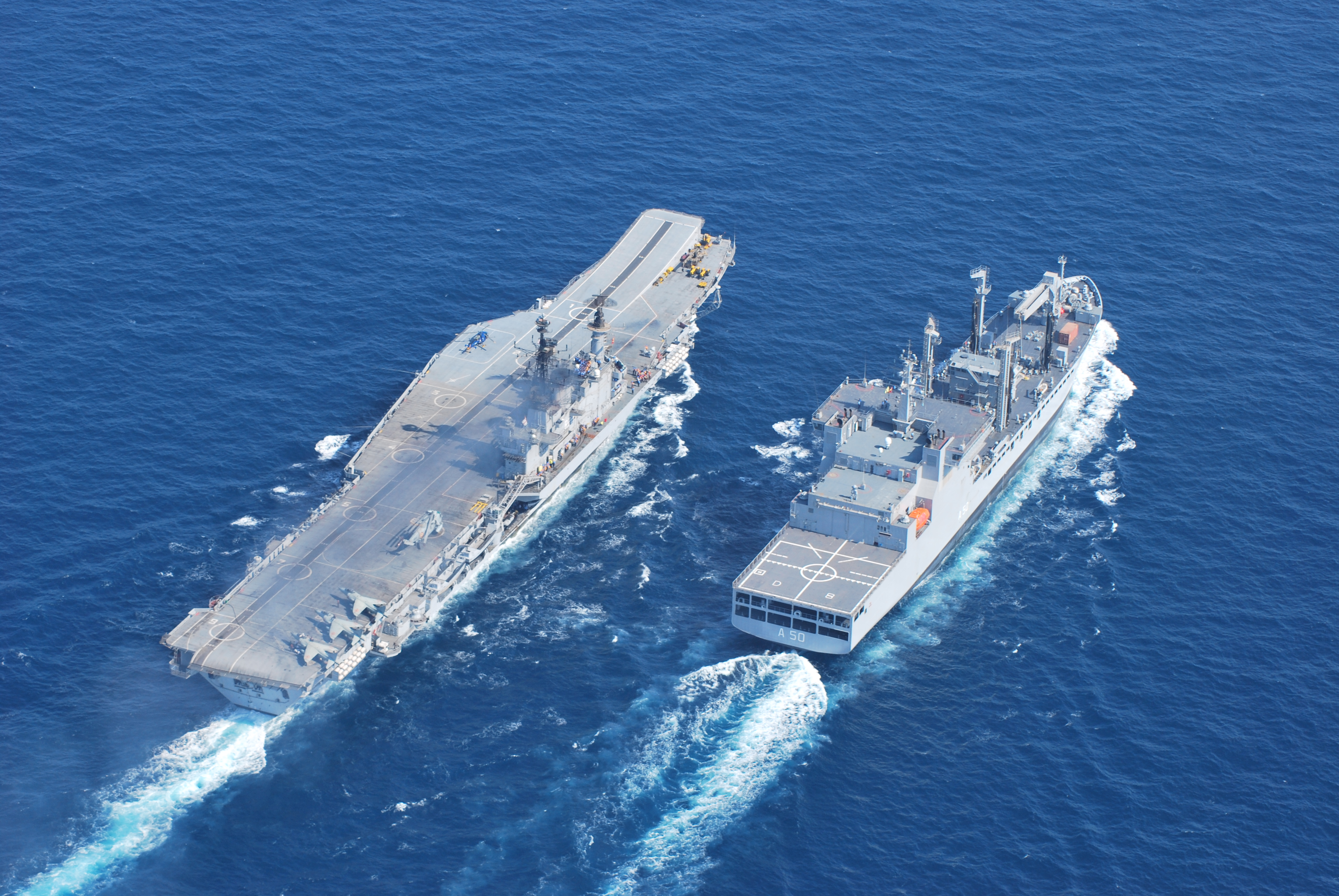
INS Viraat approaching Deepak for refueling

Deepak, along with INS Delhi took part in India-Brazil-South Africa Maritime Exercise (IBSAMAR III) during October 2012. These ships docked at Durban for three days as part of the deployment.

Deepak and Delhi, along with INS Trishul and the INS Tabar, visited Dubai in September 2015. Deepak and Delhi, along with INS Tarkash, visited Dubai on 1 June 2016 for a four-day visit, and the three ships conducted exercises with the UAE Navy.

INS Vikrant (R11) and its Carrier Battle Group (CBG), including Deepak, took part in the biennial Exercise Konkan 2025 with the Royal Navy's UK Carrier Strike Group 2025 (UK CSG 25), a formation centred on HMS Prince of Wales (R09), between 5 and 12 October 2025 off the Western Coast of India. This is the maiden instance of a dual carrier operation between the countries. While the UK CSG included HMS Richmond (F239) and RFA Tidespring (A136) along with HNoMS Roald Amundsen (F311) of the Royal Norwegian Navy and JS Akebono (DD-108) of the Japan Maritime Self-Defense Force, the Indian Navy's CBG included INS Kolkata (D63), INS Mormugao (D67), INS Surat (D69), INS Tabar (F44) and INS Teg (F45). The 2021 edition, named Konkan Shakti, was the largest exercise in the series in which all three services of both countries participated. On 8 October, the Indian Air Force deployed its Su-30MKI and Jaguar aircraft for a one-day exercise with the group.

== See also ==
- INS Jyoti, another tanker of the Indian Navy
- INS Aditya, another tanker of the Indian Navy
