= RFA Tiderace (A137) =

2018 Tide-class replenishment tanker of the Royal Fleet Auxiliary

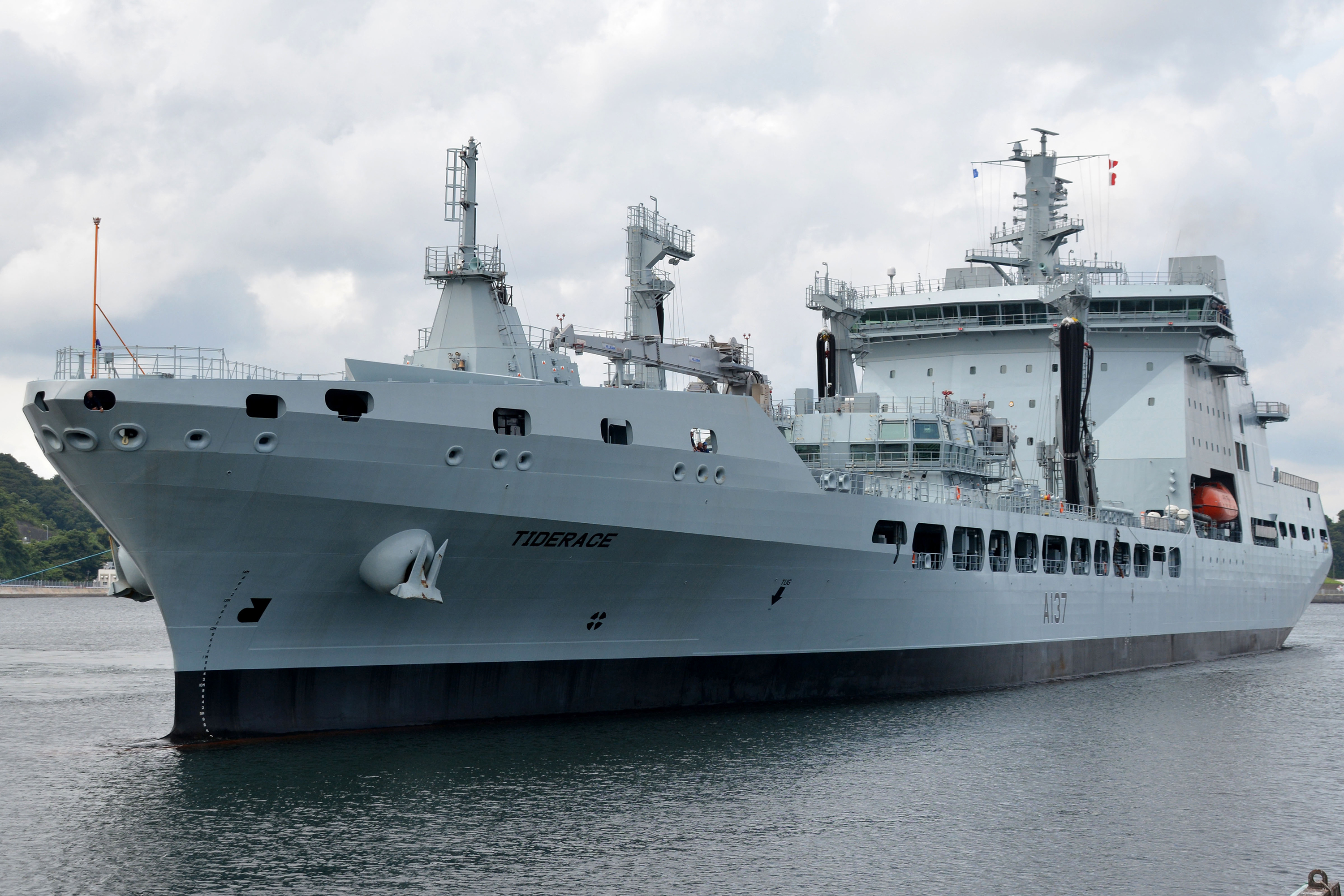
- Tiderace in August 2017

History

United Kingdom
- Name: RFA Tiderace
- Ordered: February 2012
- Builder: DSME
- Laid down: June 2015
- Launched: November 2015
- In service: 2 August 2018
- Home port: Marchwood Military Port, Southampton
- Identification: Pennant number: A137; IMO number: 9655547
- Status: In active service

General characteristics
- Class & type: Tide-class fast fleet tanker
- Displacement: 37,000 t (36,000 long tons)
- Length: 200.9 m (659 ft 1 in)
- Beam: 28.6 m (93 ft 10 in)
- Draft: 10 m (32 ft 10 in)
- Propulsion: CODELOD
- Speed: 20 knots (37 km/h; 23 mph)
- Range: 18,200 nautical miles (33,700 km; 20,900 mi)
- Capacity: Tanks for diesel oil, aviation fuel (19,000 m³) and fresh water (1,400 m³); Lubrication oil stored in drums; Stowage for up to 8 ft × 20 ft containers
- Complement: 63 plus 46 non-crew embarked persons (Royal Marines, flight crew, trainees)
- Sensors & processing systems: Kelvin Hughes Integrated Bridge System; Servowatch IPMS System; 3 × SharpEye radar
- Armament: 2 × Phalanx CIWS (fitted for, depending on deployment); 2 × 30 mm cannons (fitted for, depending on deployment); 4 × MK44 Miniguns (retired 2023 and replaced by Browning .50 caliber heavy machine guns); 4 × General Purpose Machine Guns
- Aircraft carried: 1 medium helicopter
- Aviation facilities: Full hangar facilities (Merlin/Wildcat), flight deck capable of landing Chinook-size helicopter

RFA Tiderace is a Tide-class replenishment tanker of the British Royal Fleet Auxiliary (RFA). Ordered from DSME in 2012, she was officially named on 1 December 2016 and was accepted by the Ministry of Defence in June 2017. Tiderace entered service on 2 August 2018.

Tiderace departed her builders in August 2017 bound for the United Kingdom. She arrived at A&P Falmouth, Cornwall on 25 September 2017 for final fitting out with sensitive military equipment prior to UK sea trials and entry into service in 2018. As of April 2024, she was reported to be in "extended readiness" (uncrewed reserve).

== Construction ==
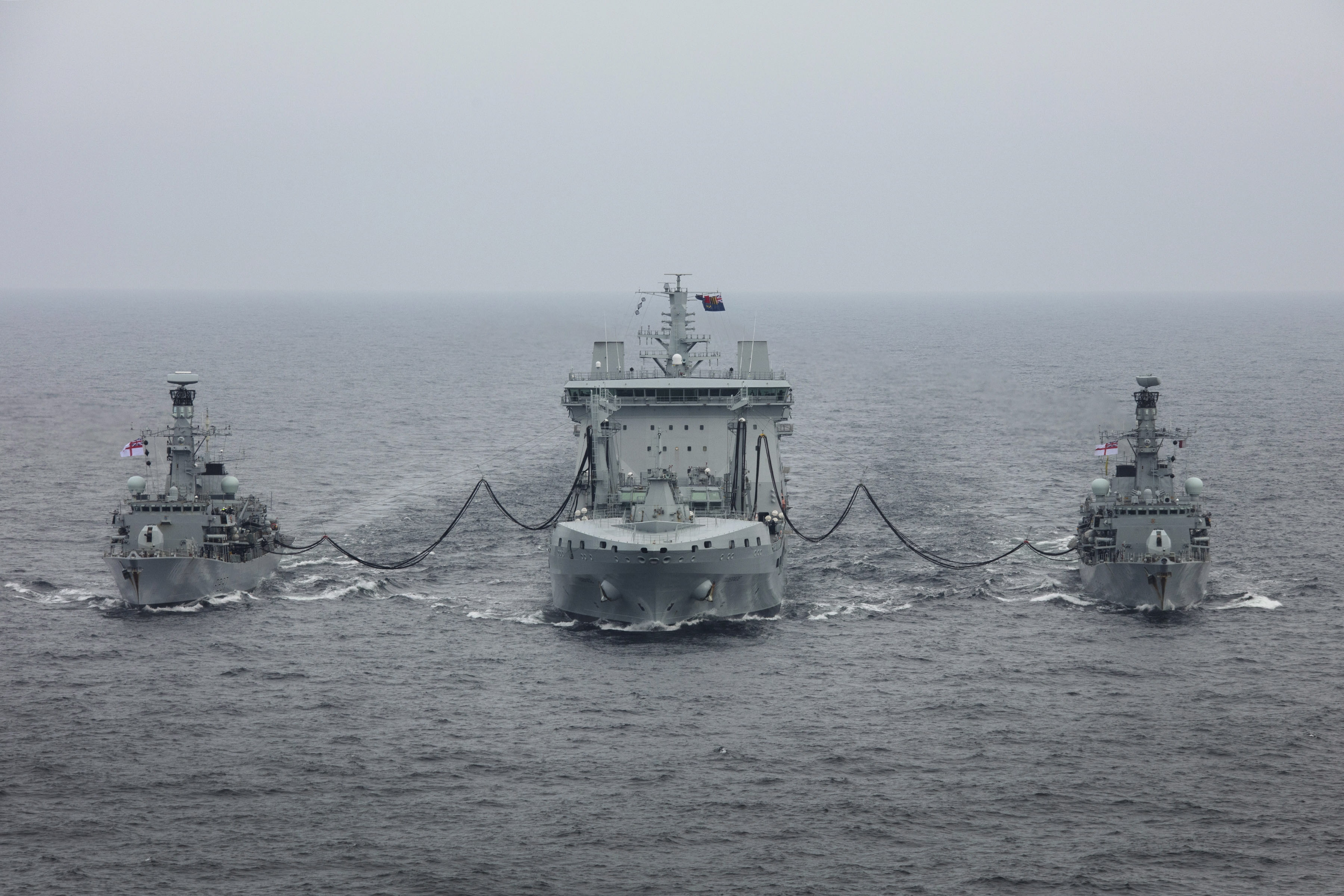
Tiderace resupplying HMS Lancaster and HMS Westminster.

Tiderace is the second ship of her class and was ordered on 22 February 2012. Like her sister ships, she was built by DSME in South Korea with her fitting-out carried out by A&P Group in Falmouth, England. Her steel was first cut on 8 December 2014, prior to being laid down on 8 June 2015. On 10 November 2015, a fire broke out on an LPG carrier being built in the same drydock as Tiderace, killing a shipyard worker and injuring seven others. The incident did not cause any damage to Tiderace but it caused a delay of nearly three weeks. She was subsequently launched on 28 November 2015 and was officially named by her Lady Sponsor, Mrs Anita Lister, the wife of Royal Navy Vice Admiral Simon R Lister on 1 December 2016.

Builder's sea trials were carried out between 13 January and 29 June 2017. On completion of these, Tiderace sailed from South Korea for delivery to the United Kingdom via the Kanmon Straits of Japan, the United States naval bases in Yokosuka, Japan and San Diego, United States, the Panama Canal and Curaçao. She arrived in Falmouth, England on 24 September 2017 prior to entering drydock at A&P Falmouth for UK customisation, including the installation of armour, self-defence weaponry and communications systems. Following this, she began a series of capability assessment trials, replenishment at sea (RAS) trials and first-of-class flying trials which saw her first RAS with Royal Navy frigate HMS Somerset and her first flying trials with a Merlin Mk2 helicopter from 814 Naval Air Squadron. She officially joined the fleet on 3 August 2018 following a service of dedication in Portland.

== Operational history ==
In April 2019, Tiderace participated in Exercise Joint Warrior, a large-scale NATO military exercise held in Scotland. She joined a task force led by the Royal Navy's landing platform dock HMS Albion, which also included the destroyer HMS Defender, frigate HMS Kent, landing ship dock RFA Lyme Bay and 3 Commando Brigade, Royal Marines.

In January 2020, Tiderace began a refit and maintenance period at the Cammell Laird shipyard in Birkenhead, England. Her six month refit involved "major and invasive" work, including the replacement of all four engine/generator funnel exhausts and an upgrade to her high-pressure saltwater fire-main. After her refit, she made a maiden call to Gibraltar.

As of 2024, she was reported to be in "extended readiness" (uncrewed reserve), largely the product of serious personnel shortages in the RFA. In late 2025 it was indicated that the ship would again be activated. She was seen on the River Mersey on 1 April 2026.

== See also ==
- List of replenishment ships of the Royal Fleet Auxiliary
