= INS Teg =

Indian Navy frigate

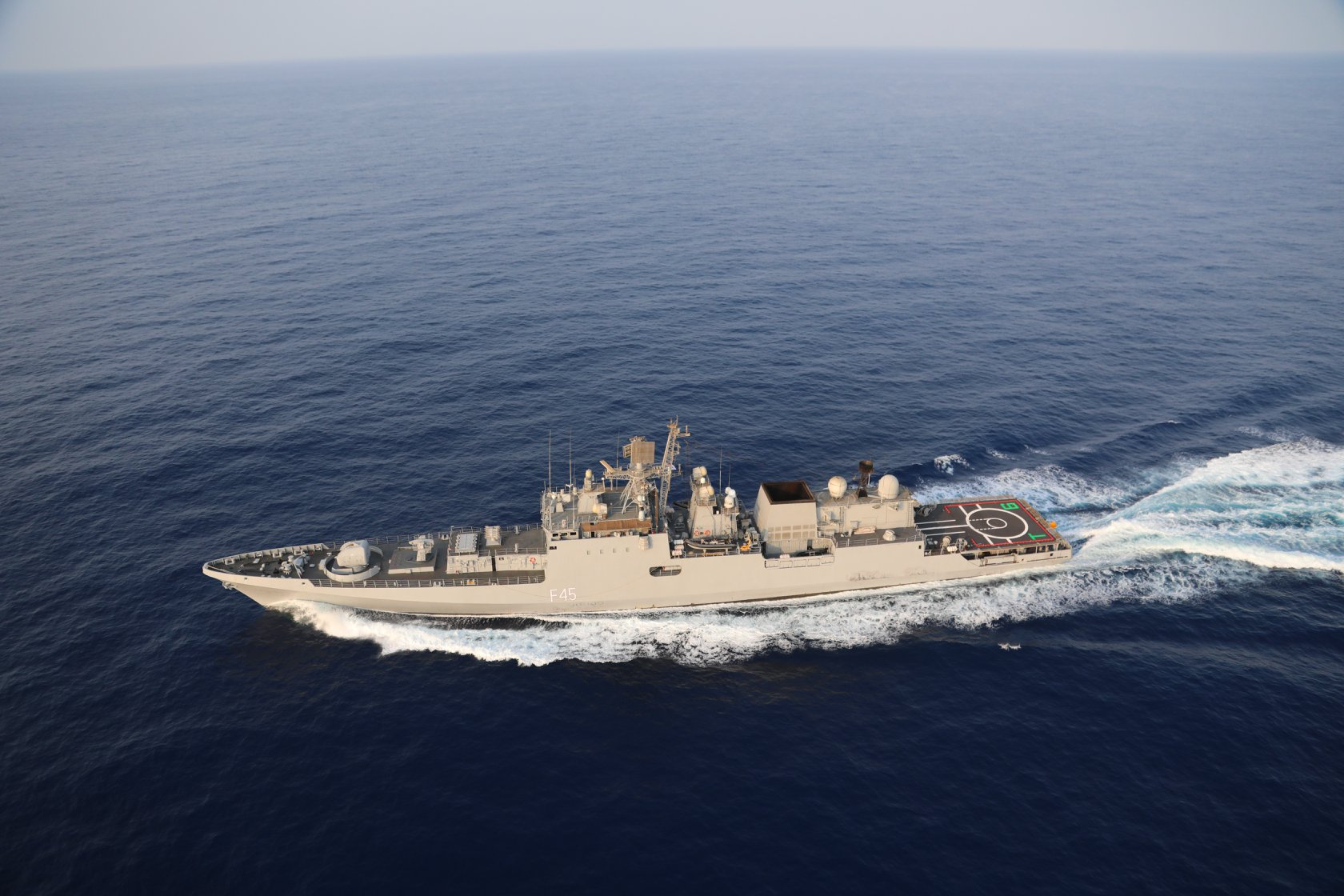
- INS Teg at sea

History

India
- Name: INS Teg
- Namesake: "Saber"
- Ordered: 14 July 2007
- Builder: Yantar Shipyard
- Laid down: July 2007
- Launched: 27 November 2009
- Acquired: 1 September 2011
- Commissioned: 27 April 2012
- Motto: "Towards Eternal Glory"
- Status: in active service

General characteristics
- Class & type: Talwar-class frigate
- Displacement: 3,620 long tons (3,678 t) standard; 4,035 long tons (4,100 t) full load
- Length: 124.8 m (409 ft 5 in)
- Beam: 15.2 m (49 ft 10 in)
- Draught: 4.5 m (14 ft 9 in)
- Propulsion: 2 × DS-71 cruise turbines (9,000 shp)); 2 × DT-59 boost turbines (19,500 shp)
- Speed: 30 kn (56 km/h; 35 mph)
- Range: 4,850 nmi (8,980 km; 5,580 mi) at 14 kn (26 km/h; 16 mph); 1,600 nmi (3,000 km; 1,800 mi) at 30 kn (56 km/h; 35 mph)
- Complement: 180 (18 officers)
- Sensors & processing systems: 1 × 3Ts-25E Garpun-B surface search radar; 1 × MR-212/201-1 navigation radar; 1 × Kelvin Hughes Nucleus-2 6000A radar; 1 × Ladoga-ME-11356 intertial navigation and stabilisation; 1 × Fregat M2EM 3D circular scan radar; 1 × Ratep JSC 5P-10E Puma fire-control system; 1 × 3R14N-11356 fire-control system FCS; 4 × MR-90 Orekh; BEL HUMSA (Hull Mounted Sonar Array)
- Electronic warfare & decoys: 1 × TK-25E-5 EWS; 1 × PK-10 ship-borne decoy launching systems; 4 × KT-216 decoy launchers
- Armament: Anti-air missiles: 24 × Shtil-1 medium range missiles; 8 × Igla-1E (SA-18); Anti-ship/Land-attack missiles: 8 × VLS launched BrahMos, anti-ship cruise missiles; Guns: 1 × 100 mm A-190E, naval gun; 2 × AK-630 CIWS; Anti-submarine warfare: 2 × 2 533 mm torpedo tubes; 1 × RBU-6000 (RPK-8) rocket launcher
- Aircraft carried: 1 × Ka-28 Helix-A, Ka-31 Helix B or HAL Dhruv helicopter

INS Teg (F45) (lit. 'Sword') is the fourth Talwar-class frigate constructed for the Indian Navy. She was built by the Yantar shipyard in Kaliningrad, Russia, and was commissioned to Navy service on 27 April 2012. She is the first of the second batch of Talwar-class frigates to be completed.

== Design ==
Teg belongs to the Talwar class of frigates. The Talwar-class guided missile frigates are modified Krivak III-class frigates built by Russia. These ships use stealth technologies and a special hull design to ensure a reduced radar cross section. Much of the equipment on the ship is Russian-made, but a significant number of systems of Indian origin have also been incorporated. The main differences between Teg and the earlier Talwar-class ships are the use of BrahMos missiles in place of the Klub-N missiles and the use of AK-630 instead of Kashtan in the earlier ships. It is the first of the three frigates built in Russia as a follow-up order to the first batch of Talwar-class frigates.

== Construction ==
Teg was laid down on 27 July 2007 and launched on 27 November 2009. Following post-construction work, she began sea trials in the Baltic Sea on 1 September 2011. During Teg's sea trials in mid-October, her port-side turbine was damaged, forcing a two-week delay in her trials schedule while repairs were made. Teg completed her sea trials in early December 2011, leaving only acceptance trials before her delivery to the Indian Navy in April 2012. These trials were completed in early February 2012.

== Service ==
INS Teg was commissioned into the Indian Navy on 27 April 2012, at the Yantar shipyard at Kaliningrad in Russia. She was commissioned by Vice Admiral KN Sushil, Flag Officer Commanding-in-Chief, Southern Naval Command with Captain Rakesh Kumar Dahiya serving as her first commanding officer.

=== 2024 ===
On 17 July, Teg was deployed along with an P-8I maritime patrol aircraft to assist in search and rescue operations after a Comoros-flagged oil tanker MV Prestige Falcon capsized off the coast of Oman while heading towards port of Aden, Yemen. The crew included 3 Sri Lankans and 13 Indians and were reported missing. The oil tanker capsized while INS Teg was deployed in the vicinity. It received orders on 15 July and proceeded for the Search and Rescue mission along with the Royal Navy of Oman.

As of 18 July, Teg rescued 8 Indians and one Lankan, while one was confirmed dead who was later confirmed to be an Indian national. The search for other crew members of the capsized ship is on. The capsized ship was submerged and inverted. The Indians who were rescued have returned safely and are under care.

=== 2025 ===
Between 19 and 22 June, the ship was on a port call at Port Louis, Mauritius. The ship's crew also conducted joint surveillance of Mauritian EEZ with their National Coast Guard (NCG) ships and aircraft.

From 26 to 30 June, the ship was on a five-day port call at Port Victoria, Seychelles. A marching contingent of the Indian Naval Band onboard the ship will participate in Seychelles' National Day on 29 June while the ship's integral helicopter will also undertake a flypast. While departing after the port call, the ship will join the Seychelles Coast Guard (SCG) personnel for joint Exclusive Economic Zone (EEZ) surveillance along with an SCG ship until 2 July.

INS Vikrant (R11) and its Carrier Battle Group (CBG), including Teg, took part in the biennial Exercise Konkan 2025 with the Royal Navy's UK Carrier Strike Group 2025 (UK CSG 25), a formation centred on HMS Prince of Wales (R09), between 5 and 12 October 2025 off the Western Coast of India. This is the maiden instance of a dual carrier operation between the countries. While the UK CSG included HMS Richmond (F239) and RFA Tidespring (A136) along with HNoMS Roald Amundsen (F311) of the Royal Norwegian Navy and JS Akebono (DD-108) of the Japan Maritime Self-Defense Force, the Indian Navy's CBG included INS Kolkata (D63), INS Mormugao (D67), INS Surat (D69), INS Tabar (F44), and INS Deepak (A50). The 2021 edition, named Konkan Shakti, was the largest exercise in the series in which all three services of both countries participated. On 8 October, the Indian Air Force deployed its Su-30MKI and Jaguar aircraft for a one-day exercise with the group.
