= HNoMS Maud =

Norwegian naval supply ship

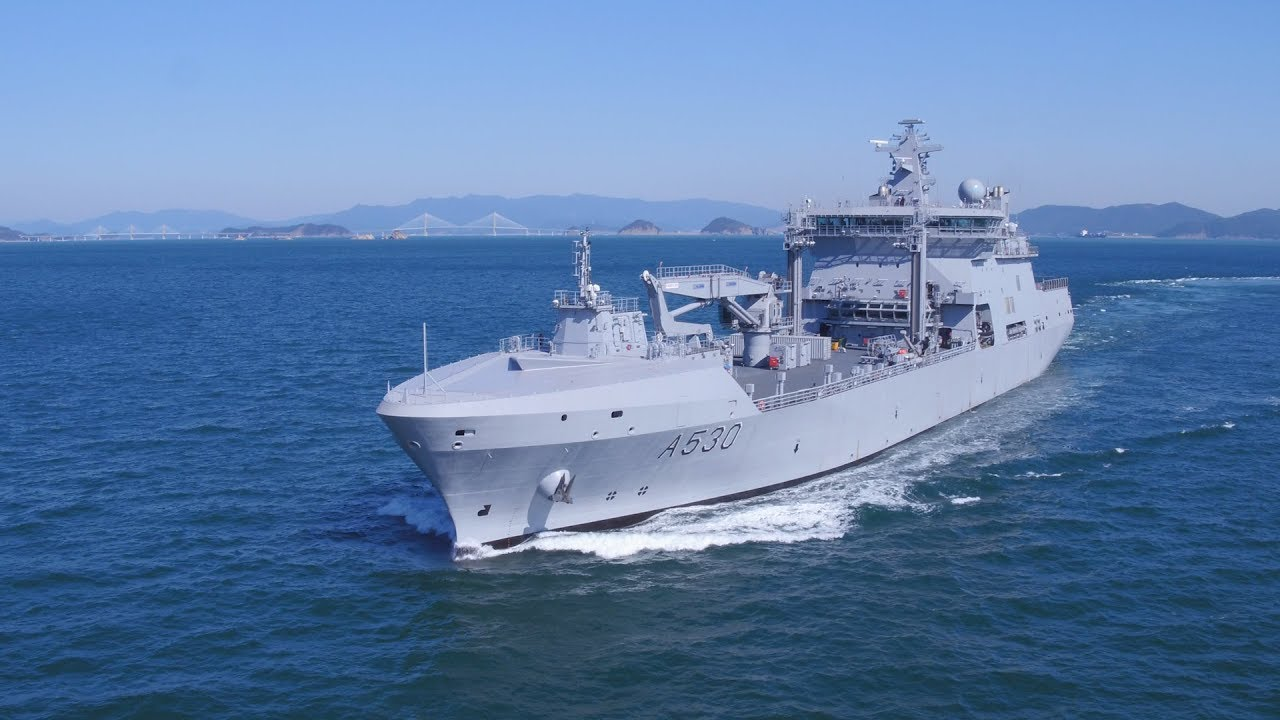
- HNoMS Maud sailing from the shipyard under Norwegian command

History

Norway
- Name: HNoMS Maud
- Ordered: 28 June 2013
- Builder: Daewoo Shipbuilding & Marine Engineering, South Korea
- Laid down: 15 December 2015
- Launched: 4 June 2016
- Christened: 21 May 2019
- Acquired: 16 November 2018
- Commissioned: 21 May 2019
- Home port: Haakonsvern naval base
- Identification: Pennant number: A530; IMO number: 9703916; MMSI number: 257092200; Callsign: LBEB
- Status: In active service
- Badge

General characteristics
- Type: Replenishment oiler
- Displacement: 27,500 long tons (27,941 t)
- Length: 183 m (600 ft 5 in)
- Beam: 25.9 m (85 ft 0 in)
- Draught: 8.62 m (28 ft 3 in)
- Propulsion: Diesel Hybrid (CODLOD) 2 × 7,500 kW Wärtsilä main engines 2 × 3,170 kW Wärtsilä diesel generators 2 × 1,000 kW Wärtsilä bow thrusters
- Speed: 18 knots (33 km/h; 21 mph)
- Range: 10,000 nmi (19,000 km; 12,000 mi)
- Complement: 43 core + up to 116 additional
- Armament: 4 × Sea Protector
- Aircraft carried: Hangar space for 2 × Medium-Sized Helicopters

HNoMS Maud is a replenishment oiler constructed at Daewoo Shipbuilding & Marine Engineering in South Korea. She was built on behalf of the Norwegian Defense Materials Agency Forsvarsmateriell, for service in the Royal Norwegian Navy.

== Role and specifications ==
Maud replaced HNoMS Valkyrien as the naval logistics vessel. The vessel's primary task is to support naval forces with after-supplies. The ship is the largest ship ever in the Royal Norwegian Navy, and is twice as large as the frigates of the Fridtjof Nansen class. She is named in honour of Queen Maud of Norway, wife of Haakon VII of Norway. Her design is a variation of the Tide-class tankers ordered for Britain's Royal Fleet Auxiliary.

The primary mission of the vessel is to provide supplies of fuel, ordinance and equipment for warships that are part of the Norwegian Task Group (NorTG) to expand the force's operational endurance at sea. Secondary tasks will include sovereignty, support for other military units, civilian support, search and rescue (SAR), humanitarian operations and participation in network-based defense. She also carries a 48-bed hospital.

== Construction ==
The launch of the ship was originally planned for March 2016. Due to delays at the yard, delivery was postponed until the autumn of 2017, with operations set to begin in 2018. The delivery was later postponed until 30 April 2018, but due to damage to her main engines her delivery date was again postponed. In September 2017 members of her prospective crew attended training exercises in replenishment at sea (RAS) at the Royal Navy training facilities at HMS Raleigh, Torpoint.

Because of the delays during construction of HNoMS Maud, two Reine-class patrol vessels of the Norwegian Coast Guard, Olav Tryggvason and Magnus Lagabøte, were transferred to the navy as auxiliary ships. Their prefix was therefore changed from "NoCGV" to "HNoMS".

== Service history ==
The navy took over Maud in a ceremony at the Daewoo shipyard on 16 November 2018. Chief of Staff of the Navy, flag commander Øystein Wemberg said "This is a great and historic day for the Navy and the entire maritime Norway. It is not every day we take over a new vessel." Command was taken with the hoisting of the Norwegian flag, and the crew moved in for the first time.

Maud arrived in Norway on 29 March 2019. On 21 May 2019, Maud was christened and commissioned in Bergen. The ship would be tested for a year until the warranty runs out. In December 2019, Maud was banned from sailing after global risk-assessment firm DNV GL revealed several safety hazards, deeming the vessel too unsafe to sail. The problems uncovered included heavy doors which pose a "danger" to the crew, the absence of proper lighting on board, new medical equipment that turned out to be faulty or outdated, and an oxygen generator in the operating room that could potentially pose a "major" fire hazard. The firm also found no signs that the vessel had undergone any maintenance for two years while docked at the shipyard. The ship returned to the sea in September 2020.

According to the Navy and the Ministry of Defence, all problems with the ship were to be tackled during its test run, with the goal of having the vessel in operation during the second quarter of 2020. In September 2020 Maud was declared safe and she sailed to Nieuwe Haven Naval Base of the Royal Netherlands Navy in Den Helder for work needed on her replenishment at sea masts.

In February 2021 she performed her first replenishment at sea operation alongside the frigate HNoMS Fridtjof Nansen. In September 2021 the ship started her maiden deployment, joining Standing NATO Maritime Group 1 as a "fleet oiler". Later that month, she performed her first replenishment at sea operation with an allied vessel, the Dutch frigate HNLMS Van Amstel.

Maud joined SNMG1 in late August 2022. In 2025, the support ship accompanied the frigate HNoMS Roald Amundsen in joining the Royal Navy's carrier strike group as part of Operation HIGHMAST in a deployment to the Indo-Pacific region.
