= HNoMS Roald Amundsen =

2005 Fridtjof Nansen-class frigate

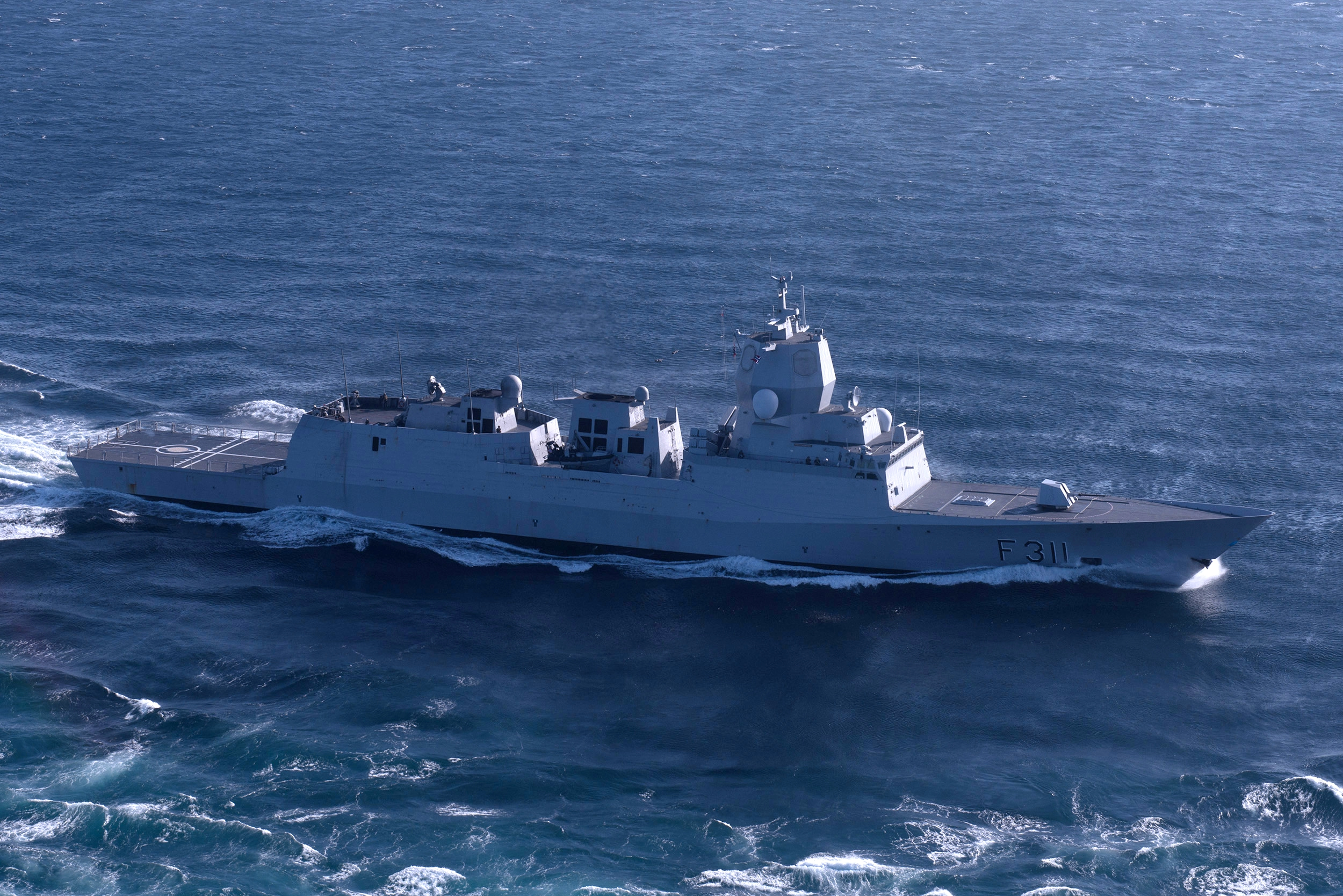
- Roald Amundsen in 2018

History

Norway
- Name: Roald Amundsen
- Namesake: Norwegian explorer Roald Amundsen
- Ordered: 23 June 2000
- Builder: Navantia, Ferrol
- Laid down: 3 June 2004
- Launched: 24 May 2005
- Commissioned: 21 May 2007
- Identification: Pennant number: F311; MMSI number: 259042000; Callsign: LABA
- Status: Active
- Badge

General characteristics
- Class & type: Fridtjof Nansen-class frigate
- Displacement: 5,290 tons
- Length: 134 m (439.63 ft)
- Beam: 16.8 m (55.12 ft)
- Draft: 7.6 m (24.93 ft)
- Propulsion: Combined diesel and gas (CODAG); Two BAZAN BRAVO 12V 4.5 MW diesel engines for cruising; One GE LM2500 21.5 MW gas turbine for high speed running; MAAG gearboxes; two shafts driving controllable pitch propellers; Bow Thruster Retractable (Electric)1 MW Brunvoll; Diesel Generators 4 × MTU 396 Serie 12V 1250 KVA
- Speed: 27 knots (50.00 km/h)
- Range: 4,500 nautical miles (8,334.00 km)
- Complement: 120 men, accommodations for 146; Lockheed Martin AN/SPY-1F 3-D multifunction radar; Reutech RSR 210N air/sea surveillance radar; Sagem Vigy 20 Electro Optical Director; MRS 2000 hull mounted sonar; Captas MK II V1 active/passive towed sonar; 2 × Mark 82 fire-control radar
- Electronic warfare & decoys: Terma DL-12T decoy launcher, Loki torpedo countermeasure
- Armament: 8-cell Mk41 VLS for 32 × RIM-162 ESSM; 8 × Naval Strike Missile SSMs; 4 × torpedo tubes for Sting Ray torpedoes; Depth charges; 1 × 76 mm OTO Melara Super Rapid gun; 4 × 12,7 mm Browning M2HB HMG; 4 × Protector (RWS) ( Sea PROTECTOR ); 2 × LRAD Long Range Acoustic Device; Prepared for, but not equipped with: 1 × Otobreda 127 mm/54 gun to replace the 76 mm; 1 × spare 76mm OTO Melara Super Rapid gun; 1 × spare CIWS gun w/ calibre 40 mm or less; 3 × spare 8- cell Mk41 VLS launchers; Low cost ASW; ECM: Active Off-board Decoy
- Aircraft carried: 1 × NH90 helicopter

HNoMS Roald Amundsen is a Fridtjof Nansen-class frigate of the Royal Norwegian Navy.

== Construction and commissioning ==
Built by the Spanish shipbuilders Navantia, in Ferrol, Roald Amundsen was the second of the Fridtjof Nansen class to be launched and then commissioned into the Royal Norwegian Navy.

== Service ==
In January 2018 Roald Amundsen arrived at Naval Station Norfolk with the German Sachsen-class frigate Hessen, preparatory to both deploying on a Composite Training Unit Exercise with USS Harry S. Truman and Carrier Strike Group 8.

In 2025, the frigate (accompanied by the support ship HNoMS Maud) joined the Royal Navy's carrier strike group as part of Operation in a deployment to the Indo-Pacific region. For the deployment, the frigate embarked a Royal Navy Wildcat helicopter from 815 Naval Air Squadron.

On 10 June 2025, Roald Amundsen arrived at the Port of Hambantota, Sri Lanka on a replenishment visit. The vessel departed the island on 11 June.

HNoMS Roald Amundsen, as part of the UK strike group, along with HMS Prince of Wales (R09), HMS Richmond (F239), RFA Tidespring (A136) and JS Akebono (DD-108) of the Japan Maritime Self-Defense Force, took part in Exercise Konkan 2025, a bilateral and biennial maritime exercise conducted the Royal Navy and the Indian Navy, between 5 and 8 October 2025. The Indian Navy was represented by INS Vikrant and its Carrier Battle Group (CBG), consisting of INS Kolkata (D63), INS Mormugao (D67), INS Surat (D69), INS Tabar (F44), INS Teg (F45) and INS Deepak (A50). This is the maiden instance of a dual carrier operation between the countries. On 8 October, the Indian Air Force deployed its Su-30MKI and Jaguar aircraft for a one-day exercise with the group. Following the conclusion of the exercise, Richmond and Prince of Wales conduct a port call at Indira Dock, Mumbai and Goa, respectively.
