= Tide-class tanker =

Class of four fast fleet tankers of the Royal Fleet Auxiliary

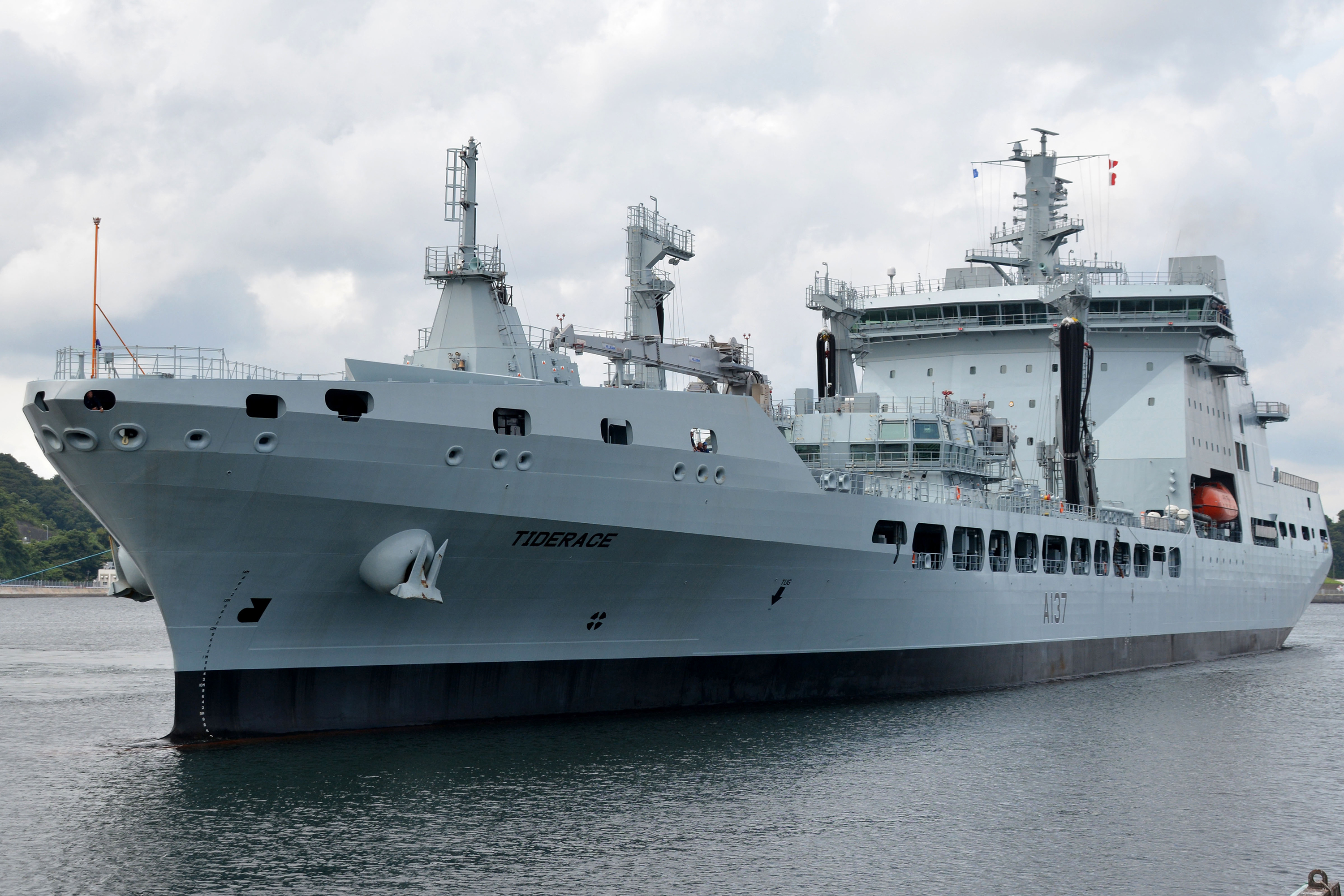
- Tiderace in August 2017

Class overview
- Name: Tide class
- Builders: Daewoo Shipbuilding & Marine Engineering
- Operators: Royal Fleet Auxiliary
- Preceded by: Leaf class and Rover class
- Cost: £452 million net (eventually £550 million net as no money was returned to the UK treasury) for 4 RFA vessels (hull build only); £137.5 million per RFA unit final (hull build only); NOK 1.32 billion for HNoMS Maud (FY 2013)
- Built: 2014–2018
- In service: 2017
- Planned: 4 (RFA), 1 (Norway)
- Completed: 4 (RFA), 1 (Norway)
- Active: 3 (RFA), 1 (Norway)
- Laid up: 1 (RFA) in extended readiness (uncrewed reserve)

General characteristics
- Type: Fast fleet tanker
- Displacement: 39,000 t (38,000 long tons; 43,000 short tons)
- Length: 200.9 m (659 ft 1 in)
- Beam: 28.6 m (93 ft 10 in)
- Draft: 10 m (32 ft 10 in)
- Propulsion: Combined diesel-electric or diesel (CODELOD)
- Speed: 20 knots (37 km/h; 23 mph)
- Range: 18,200 nautical miles (33,700 km; 20,900 mi)
- Capacity: Tanks for diesel oil, aviation fuel (19,000 m³) and fresh water (1,400 m³); Lubrication oil stored in drums; Stowage for up to 8 ft × 20 ft containers
- Complement: 63 plus 46 non-crew embarked persons (Royal Marines, flight crew, trainees)
- Sensors & processing systems: Kelvin Hughes Integrated Bridge System; Servowatch IPMS System; 3 × SharpEye radar
- Armament: 2 × Phalanx CIWS (fitted for, depending on deployment); 2 × DS30B Mk 1 30 mm guns (fitted for, depending on deployment)
- Aircraft carried: 1 × Wildcat or AgustaWestland Merlin
- Aviation facilities: Enclosed Merlin-capable hangar; Large Chinook-capable flight deck

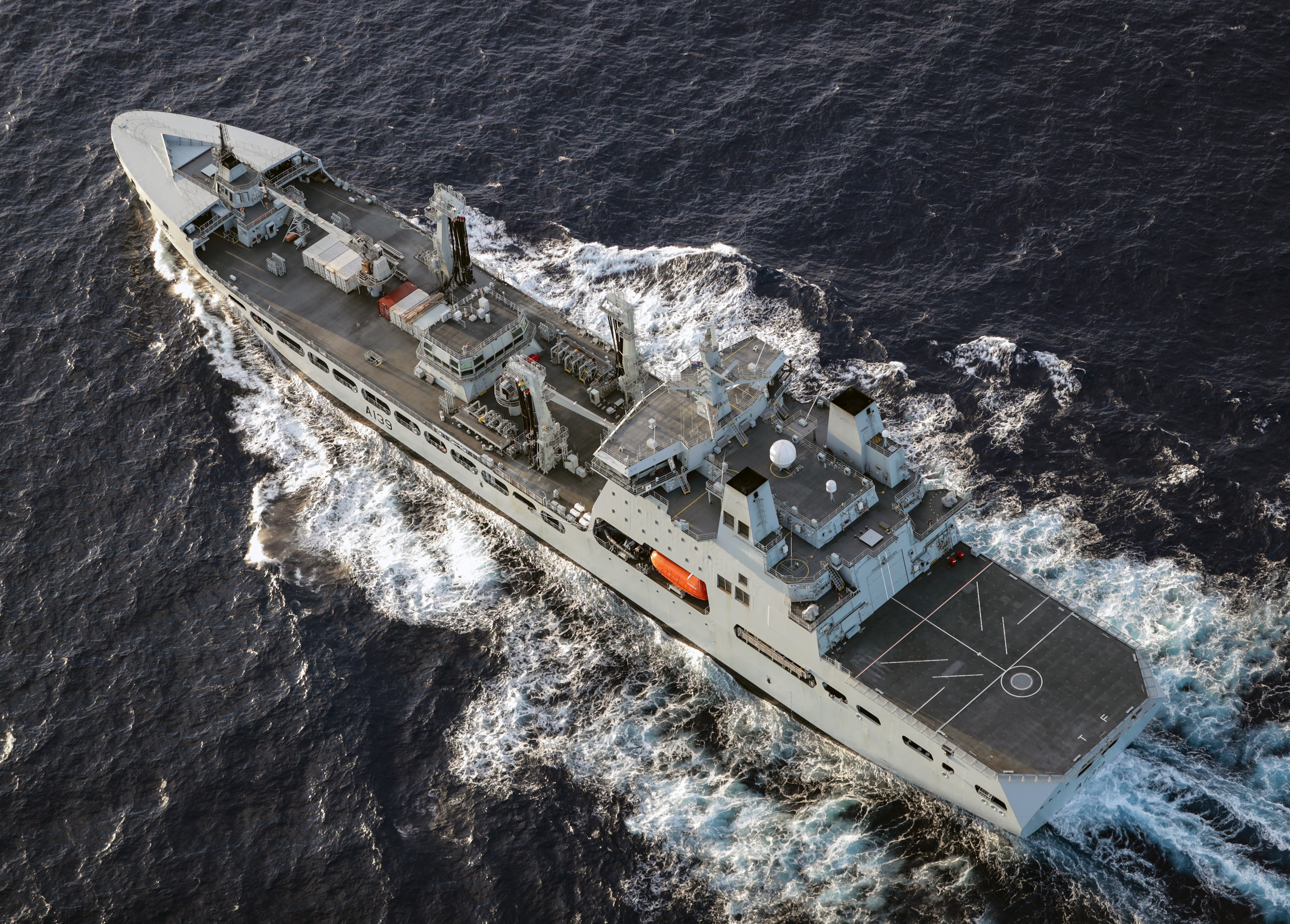
Aerial view of RFA Tideforce

The Tide-class tanker is a class of four fast fleet tankers that entered service with the British Royal Fleet Auxiliary from 2017. The 37,000 t ships provide fuel, food, fresh water, ammunition and other supplies to Royal Navy vessels around the world. Norway ordered a similar 26,000 t version with a 48-bed hospital and greater solid stores capacity, but reduced liquid capacity; it was delivered in November 2018 as HNoMS Maud two years after originally planned. The two classes are very similar but are not directly comparable due to large variance in capabilities delivered.

The two variants are both based on the AEGIR design from Britain's BMT Defence Services but were built by Daewoo Shipbuilding & Marine Engineering (DSME) in South Korea with final outfitting in the UK and Norway respectively. Britain ordered four ships in February 2012, originally at a cost of £452m for the building of the hulls however, the final cost was £550m. The Royal Norwegian Navy ordered HNoMS Maud in June 2013 for NOK1,320m (~£140m).

== Development ==
On 22 February 2012 an order for four tankers was placed with Daewoo Shipbuilding & Marine Engineering (now Hanwha Ocean) at a contract cost of £452m, plus an additional £150m to be spent in Britain, making a total cost for the four ships slightly over £600 million net, not gross. Building ships in South Korea caused controversy in Britain, but no British yards tendered for the order. On 14 November 2012 it was announced that the new class would revive names from the Cold War Tide-class oilers - Tidespring (A136), Tiderace (A137), Tidesurge (A138), and the new name Tideforce (A139). The previous Tidespring earned a battle honour in 1982 for her service during the Falklands War, which included transporting a company of Royal Marines to recapture South Georgia. The board carrying the honour and the ship's badge were both taken to Korea for installation in the new Tidespring.

=== Design ===
==== RFA Tide class ====
The Tide class are a 200.9 m (659 ft 1 in), 39,000 t derivative of BMT Defence Services' AEGIR-26 design, whose origins lie in a civilian tanker from Skipskonsulent of Norway. They are double-hulled to reduce or prevent oil being lost by damage to the outer hull, in line with the MARPOL regulations for civilian tankers (from which military tankers are partially exempt). As well as being safer, this means that Tides can go to places that discouraged their single-hulled predecessors - the recently decommissioned Rover-class vessels and Leaf-class tankers.

There are three stations for replenishment at sea (RAS) abeam, of diesel oil, aviation fuel and fresh water. There is also a rig for astern replenishment. The flight deck and helicopter hangar allow for replenishment by air - "vertical RAS". The flight deck is large and strong enough for a Chinook helicopter to land on. Propulsion uses medium-speed diesel engines driving twin shafts in a hybrid combined diesel-electric or diesel (CODELOD) arrangement designed for fuel efficiency across a wide range of speeds.

All four ships can be armed with two 30 mm cannons and two Phalanx CIWS. The 30 mm cannons are fitted aft, directed starboard, and port. One of the CIWS mounts is located forward, and the other aft. Only when a vessel is on a high-risk deployment are Phalanx CIWS and 30 mm fixtures likely to be fitted. This policy is common among RFA vessels and follows that when a ship is deployed to more dangerous theatres, such as east of Suez, heavy dedicated armament is warranted. When in home waters and carrying out more superficial tasks such as FOST, there is little need for the vessels to be equipped with heavy armaments. For instance, as of June 2021, RFA Tidespring has currently been fitted with her fore and aft Phalanx CIWS fixtures and both 30 mm cannons whilst deployed worldwide with CSG21.

==== Other variants ====
BMT offer the AEGIR fleet tanker in three sizes. The AEGIR-10, AEGIR-18 and AEGIR-26 are 18,000 DWT and 26,000 DWT respectively, and can carry 8,000 m^{3} (2,100,000 US gal), 16,000 m^{3} (4,200,000 US gal) and 24,000 m^{3} (6,300,000 US gal) of fuel. The AEGIR-18R replenishment ship trades a third of its fuel capacity for 1,350 m^{3} (48,000 cu ft) of dry stores in an extended superstructure. The standard AEGIR-18 has less range (10,000 nautical miles, 19,000 km, 12,000 mi) and is slower (18 knots, 33 km/h, 21 mph) than the British version.

The design has been entered in a number of competitions, but as of March 2016 the only foreign order has been for an AEGIR-18R derivative from the Royal Norwegian Navy in 2013 (see below). The AEGIR-18A, a derivative of the AEGIR-18R like the Norwegian ship but with among other things better air-conditioning, was offered to Australia for Project SEA 1654 Phase 3, a requirement for two supply ships to replace HMAS Success and HMAS Sirius. In June 2014 it was shortlisted along with the Buque de Aprovisionamiento en Combate, which would be built in Spain by Navantia, who have built most of Australia's recent warships. In March 2016 Australia announced it would be buying the Spanish ship. In March 2016 DSME also lost out to Hyundai Heavy Industries in a competition to supply New Zealand with a tanker. A 2014 DSME presentation points out that India, Singapore and Brazil all need new supply ships in the near future.

== Operators ==
=== Royal Fleet Auxiliary ===
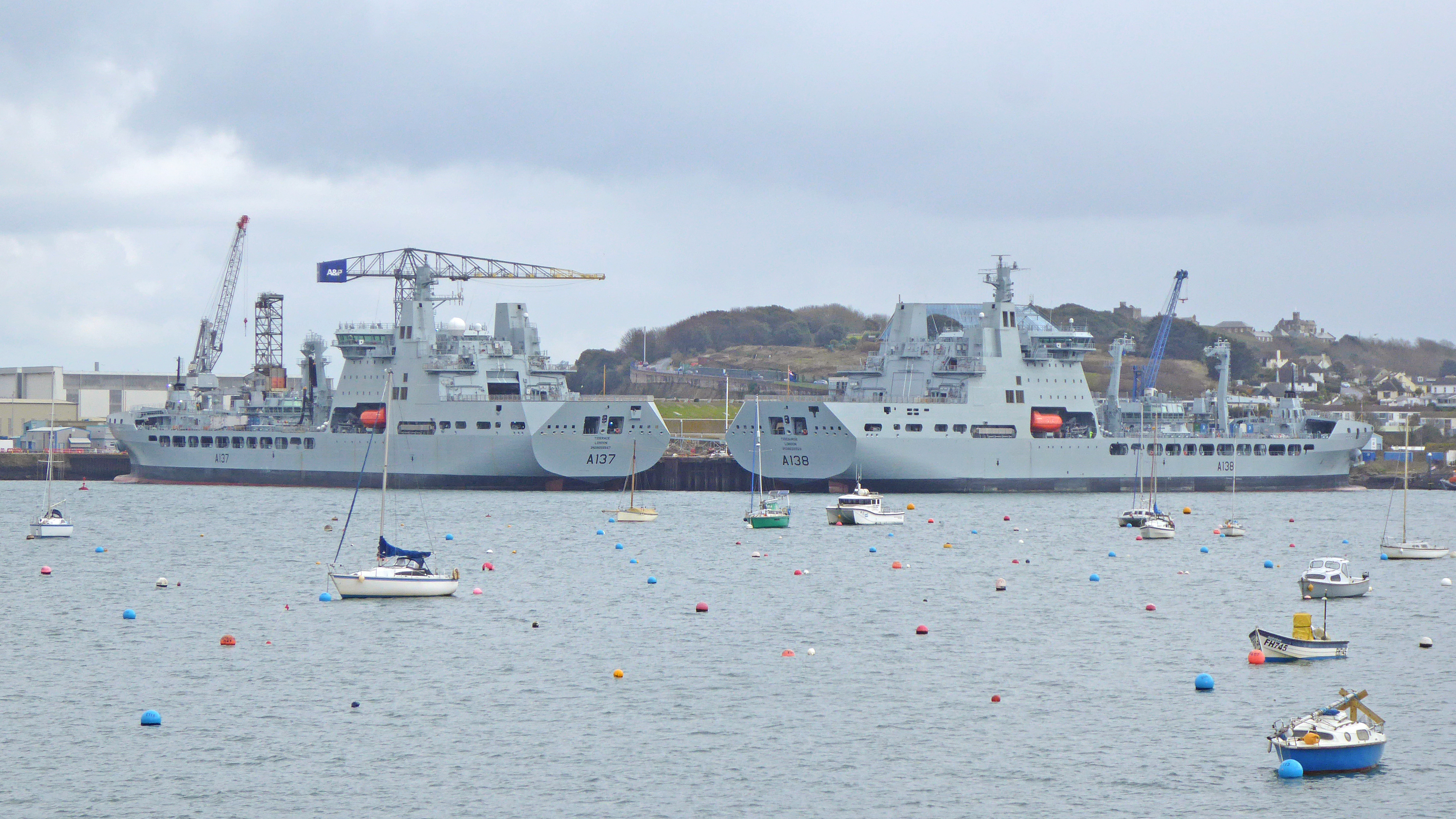
Tiderace and Tidesurge in Falmouth, England.

First steel was cut on 24 June 2014 for RFA Tidespring, and she was named in a ceremony on 7 October 2015. She was expected to arrive in Falmouth in spring 2016 to allow A&P Group to fit military equipment such as communications gear. Following sea trials, Tidespring was to enter service in the fourth quarter of 2016, with her three sister ships following at six-month intervals. In August 2016 it was reported that RFA Tidespring was still undergoing trials with builder Daewoo Shipbuilding & Marine Engineering (DSME) in South Korea; procurement minister Harriett Baldwin has blamed "delays in finalising elements of electrical design and the installation of Multi-Cable Transit insulation in accordance with new legislative regulations" which have now been resolved. Tidespring reached the UK in spring 2017, docking at Falmouth on 2 April for seventeen weeks to fit weapons and communications gear. Four months of acceptance trials will follow; her sisters were planned for service entry by the end of 2018, though two of the class were delayed into 2019.

Prefix	Name	Pennant No.	Builder	Laid down	Launched	Named	Entered service	Status
RFA	Tidespring	A136	Daewoo Shipbuilding & Marine Engineering	December 2014	April 2015	7 October 2015	27 November 2017	In service
RFA	Tiderace	A137	Daewoo Shipbuilding & Marine Engineering	June 2015	November 2015	1 December 2016	2 August 2018	In service
RFA	Tidesurge	A138	Daewoo Shipbuilding & Marine Engineering	7 December 2015	4 June 2016	29 August 2017	20 February 2019	In service
RFA	Tideforce	A139	Daewoo Shipbuilding & Marine Engineering	24 December 2015	21 January 2017	24 January 2018	30 July 2019	In service

=== Royal Norwegian Navy ===
HNoMS Maud was ordered on 28 June 2013 to replace HNoMS Tyr and HNoMS Valkyrien at a cost of NOK1,320m (~£140m) with 100% offsets. She is based on the AEGIR-18R design. but includes a 48-bed hospital underneath the flight deck with an operating theatre, isolation ward and CT scanner. She can carry 7000 tonnes of F76 fuel oil, 300 tonnes of F44/JP-5 jet fuel, 200 tonnes of ammunition and 40 ISO containers or a mix of vehicles and boats. She has two abeam RAS rigs and a stern reel, and a 25-tonne deck crane. A side ramp allows easy access for vehicles and for the support of submarines and other small vessels. The flight deck can accommodate helicopters up to CH-53 Super Stallion size, and the hangar can operate one NH90 with level 2 maintenance or stow a second. The core crew will be 40–50, with accommodation for 100 more if needed; facilities include a gym and sauna. Four Sea PROTECTOR remote weapon stations are planned.

First steel for Maud was cut on 14 April 2015. Delivery was planned for 30 September 2016 followed by acceptance trials in Norway in early 2017, and then FOST in the UK and other exercises before full entry into service in January 2018. However, delivery was postponed due to technical problems and the vessel was finally commissioned in Norway in May 2019.

Prefix	Name	Pennant No.	Builder	Laid down	Launched	Named	Commissioned	Status
HNoMS	Maud	A530	Daewoo Shipbuilding & Marine Engineering	15 December 2015	4 June 2016	21 May 2019	21 May 2019	In service

== See also ==
- List of replenishment ships of the Royal Fleet Auxiliary
- Tide-class replenishment oiler - 1950s class whose names are reused by some of the MARS ships
- John Lewis-class replenishment oiler - similar looking but larger US replenishment oilers, first four cost ~£1750m
