= RFA Tidesurge (A138) =

2019 Tide-class replenishment tanker of the Royal Fleet Auxiliary

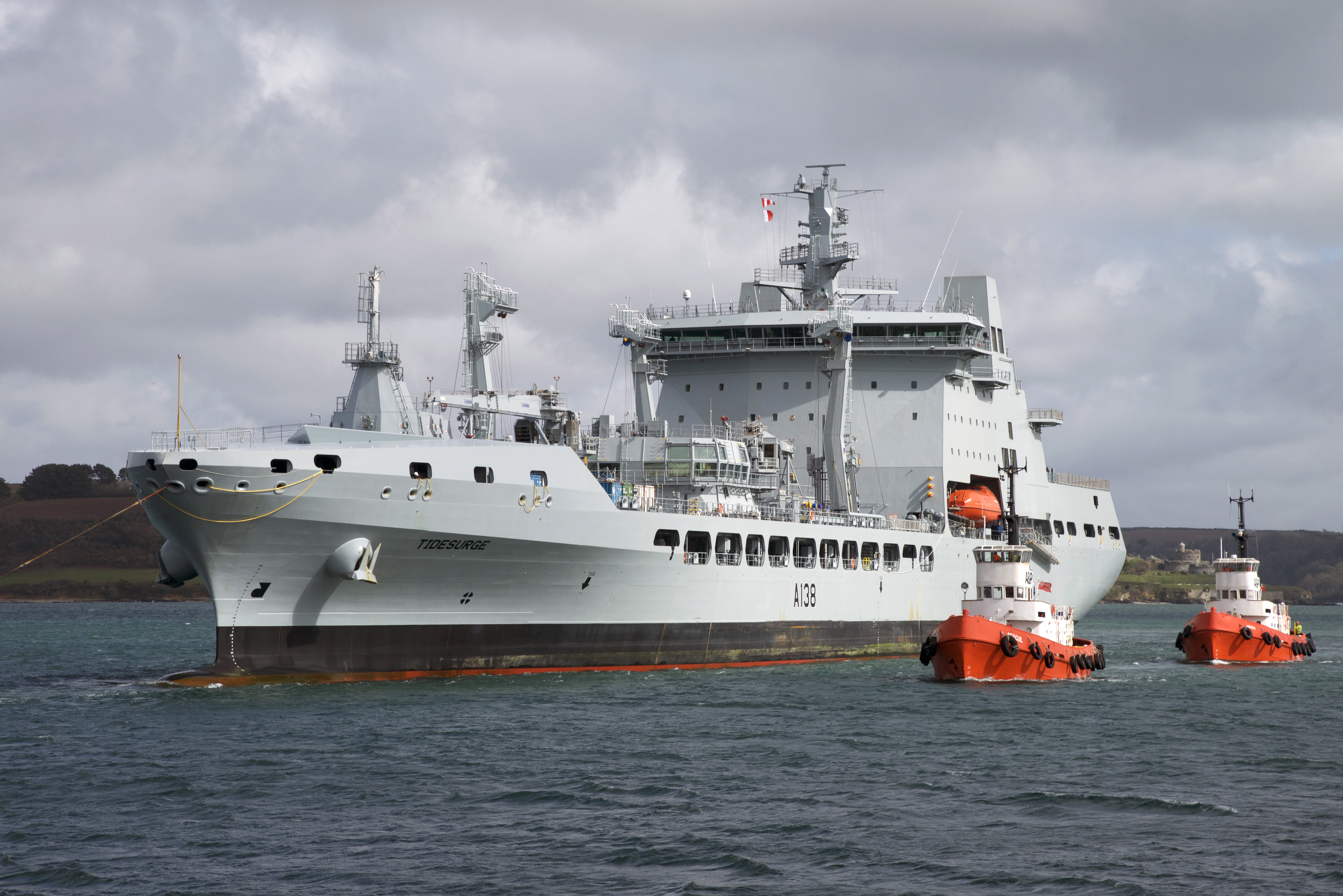
- RFA Tidesurge in Cornwall on 27 March 2018.

History

United Kingdom
- Name: RFA Tidesurge
- Ordered: February 2012
- Builder: DSME
- Laid down: 7 December 2015
- Launched: 4 June 2016
- Sponsored by: Lady Joanna Woodcock
- In service: 20 February 2019
- Home port: Marchwood Military Port, Southampton
- Identification: Pennant number: A138; IMO number: 9655559
- Status: In service

General characteristics
- Class & type: Tide-class fast fleet tanker
- Displacement: 37,000 t (36,000 long tons)
- Length: 200.9 m (659 ft 1 in)
- Beam: 28.6 m (93 ft 10 in)
- Draft: 10 m (32 ft 10 in)
- Propulsion: CODELOD
- Speed: 20 knots (37 km/h; 23 mph)
- Range: 18,200 nautical miles (33,700 km; 20,900 mi)
- Capacity: Tanks for diesel oil, aviation fuel (19,000 m³) and fresh water (1,400 m³); Lubrication oil stored in drums; Stowage for up to 8 ft × 20 ft containers
- Complement: 63 plus 46 non-crew embarked persons (Royal Marines, flight crew, trainees)
- Sensors & processing systems: Kelvin Hughes Integrated Bridge System; Servowatch IPMS System; 3 × SharpEye radar
- Armament: 2 × Phalanx CIWS (fitted for, depending on deployment); 2 × 30 mm cannons (fitted for, depending on deployment)
- Aircraft carried: 1 medium helicopter with full hangar facilities (Merlin / Wildcat), flight deck capable of landing Chinook-size helicopter

RFA Tidesurge is a Tide-class replenishment tanker of the British Royal Fleet Auxiliary (RFA). Built by DSME in 2017, she entered service with the RFA on 20 February 2019.

== Construction ==
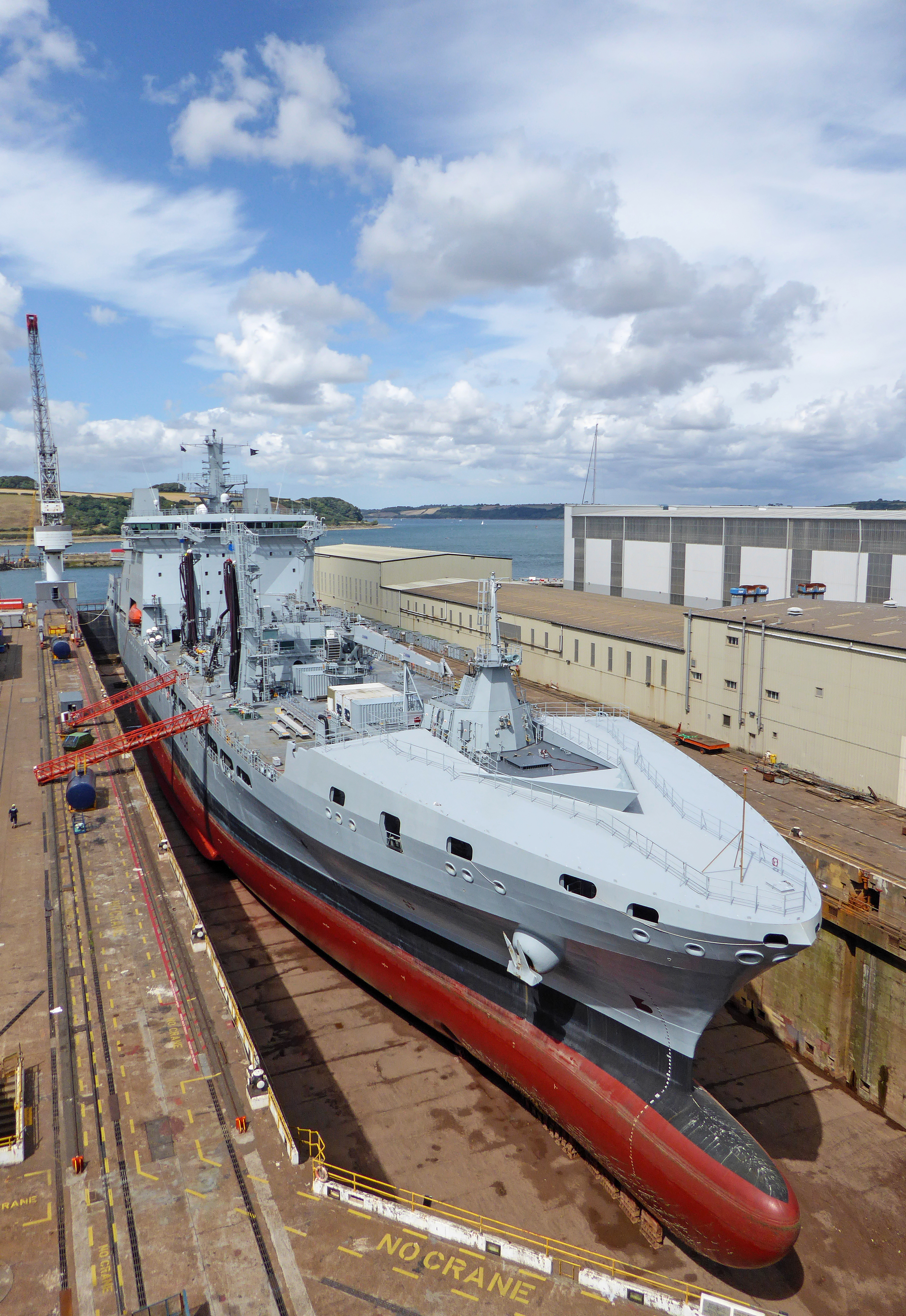
Tidesurge undergoing fitting out in A&P Falmouth, England.

The third-in-class, Tidesurge was built by DSME in Okpo, Geoje, South Korea. She was laid down on 7 December 2015 and was launched six months later on 4 July 2016. A series of builder's sea trials commenced soon after and, during November 2017, the ship formed a "sistership bond" with the Republic of Korea Navy frigate ROKS Daegu. Following the completion of builder's sea trials, Tidesurge departed Opko en route for her delivery to the United Kingdom. During her journey, she made stopovers at United States Fleet Activities Sasebo in Japan and Pearl Harbor, Hawaii. She then transited the Panama Canal into the Atlantic Ocean, anchoring off Antigua before continuing her transit to Falmouth, England. She arrived in Falmouth on 27 March 2018 and underwent UK customisation work, including the fitting of self-defence weaponry, communications systems and armour, in the A&P Falmouth shipyard. Further trials took place within British waters and, in November 2018, the ship carried out helicopter landing trials with a Chinook helicopter — a "first" for the class. In February 2019, she carried out her first replenishment at sea (RAS) with Royal Navy destroyer HMS Defender and, on 20 February 2019, she was accepted into the RFA fleet in a ceremony attended by her Lady Sponsor, Joanna Woodcock, in the ship's affiliated town of Greenock.

== Operational history ==
On 9 May 2019, Tidesurge joined two other RFA ships, Fort Victoria and Tideforce, to assist with the latter's sea trials. The manoeuvres involved the first "Tide-to-Tide" RAS in history. Two months later, Tidesurge assisted with the seizure of an Iranian oil tanker, named Grace I, which was believed to be heading to Syria. Royal Marines from 42 Commando fast-roped onto the oil tanker via a Wildcat helicopter which launched from Tidesurge. The oil tanker was impounded in Gibraltar, an act which was condemned by Iran as an "act of piracy", before later being released. Between entering service and August, Tidesurge had seen a "surge in demand", operating in the Norwegian Sea, North Sea, Atlantic Ocean and the Arctic Circle, including with an 814 Naval Air Squadron Merlin helicopter on board.

In October 2019, Tidesurge participated in Flag Officer Sea Training (FOST) before joining Exercise Joint Warrior, a large-scale NATO military exercise in Scotland. During the exercise, she carried out a RAS with U.S. Navy destroyer USS Donald Cook — reportedly a "first" for the class.

In January 2020, Tidesurge underwent general repair and maintenance at Cammell Laird's shipyard in Birkenhead, England. The ship was again reported to be in dry dock for refit at Cammell Laird in October 2023.

In November 2025 a crew member was lost overboard when Tidesurge was operating off the NW Coast of Ireland.

== See also ==
- List of replenishment ships of the Royal Fleet Auxiliary
