= Operation Veritas =

British military operations against the Taliban in Afghanistan following 2001

Operation Veritas was the codename used for British military operations against the Taliban government of Afghanistan in 2001. British forces played a supporting role to the American Operation Enduring Freedom. In addition, the British contribution was an important part of the overall forces deployed. Operation Veritas also incorporated Operation Oracle, Operation Fingal, and Operation Jacana. It was succeeded by Operation Herrick.

Many British forces were on exercise Saif Sareea II in Oman when the September 11 attacks occurred. This allowed for the swift deployment of some to Afghanistan for operations against the Taliban.

== First rotation ==
The first rotation of forces left in place after the war started included:

- HMS Illustrious
- HMS Fearless
- HMS Cornwall
- HMS Nottingham
- HMS Southampton
- HMS Trafalgar
- HMS Triumph
- HMS Beagle
- RFA Sir Tristram
- RFA Sir Percivale
- RFA Fort Victoria
- RFA Fort Rosalie
- RFA Bayleaf
- RFA Brambleleaf
- RFA Diligence

2nd Battalion, Parachute Regiment 40 Commando, Royal Marines was assigned as infantry for the operation, the unit initially deployed only C Coy and B Coy from Diego Garcia BIOT to Bagram in mid November 2001 to support UKSF operations. They were later relieved by A Coy (40 Cdo RM) in mid March 2002, prior to 45 Commando Royal Marines deployment in Operation Anaconda. A Coy were subsequently relieved in June 2002 by B Coy, who were based there until Oct 2002.

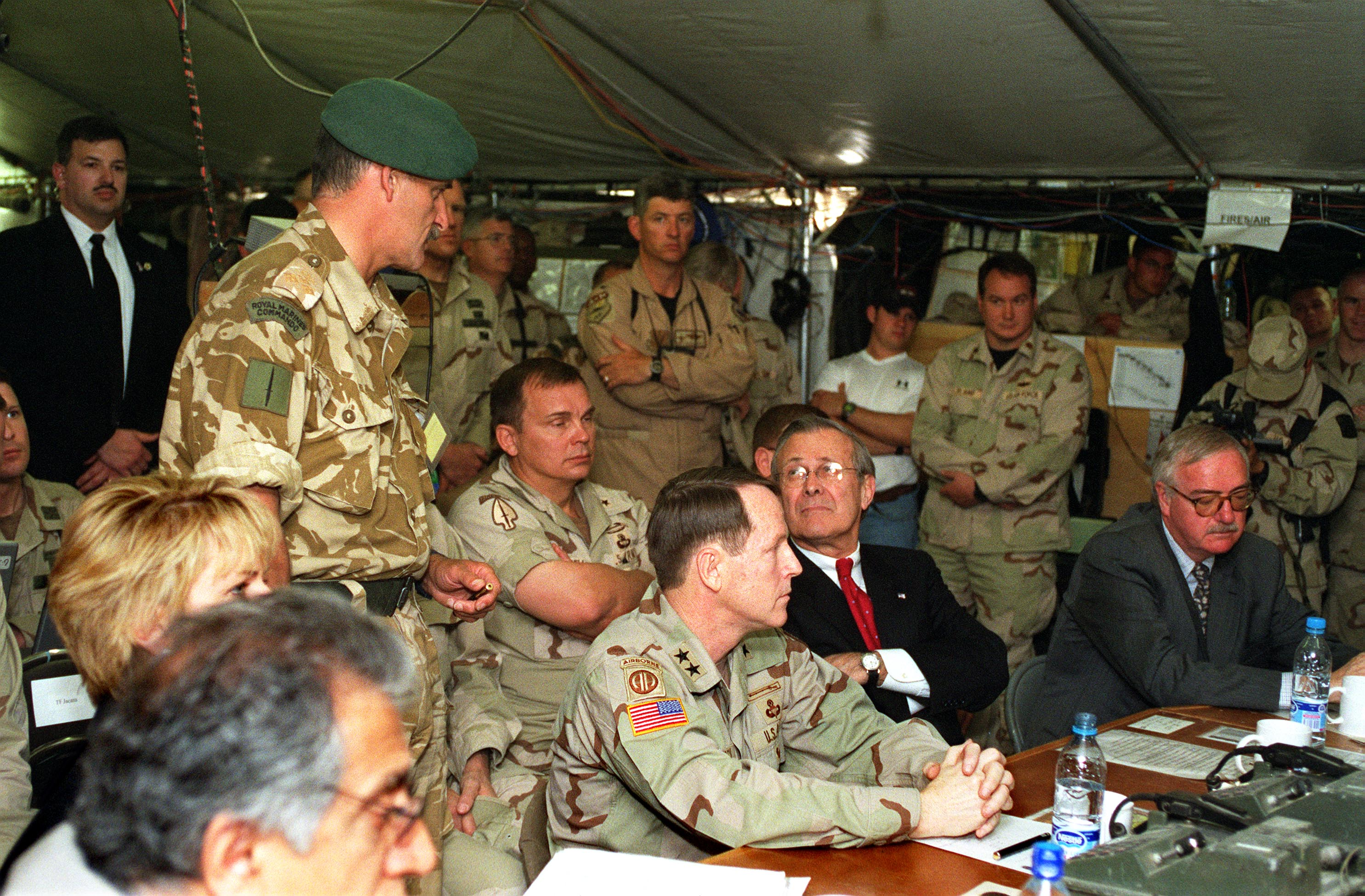
A Royal Marines commando officer speaks to U.S. Secretary of Defense Donald Rumsfeld at Bagram Airfield in April 2002.

== Second rotation ==
In March 2002, the initial naval force were relieved by one centred on HMS Ocean, carrying 45 Commando Royal Marines. Sir Tristram and Sir Percivale remained in the area. The other ships in that force were:

- HMS Ocean
- HMS York
- HMS Campbeltown
- HMS Portland
- RFA Fort George
- RFA Fort Austin

In addition to the naval taskforces present, a substantial RAF presence in the region was extant. Tristar and VC10 tankers refuelled British and United States Navy aircraft. Nimrod and Canberra aircraft performed electronic and photo reconnaissance, and Nimrods also conducted maritime patrol operations. Sentry AWACS aircraft were also deployed.

2 CH47 Chinooks from 27 Squadron RAF were deployed, initially aboard HMS Illustrious in October 2001 and redeployed from HMS Ocean to Bagram on the night of 26 March 2002, to be joined by a further 3 CH47 deployed from the UK by C17 aircraft from 99 Squadron. The Chinooks remained at Bagram to support the 45 Commando deployment, returning to RAF Odiham later that year.

== Post operation ==
After the main combat operations were over, the International Security Assistance Force (ISAF) was established in Kabul with Bravo Company 40 Commando providing protection. It was under British leadership for the first few months of its existence, and British troops are still involved with the force in 2006. 45 Commando deployed into Afghanistan from HMS Ocean in March 2002, and conducted several search and destroy operations until July. It did not contact the enemy during that time period.

On 25 August 2004, it was announced by Secretary of State for Defence Geoff Hoon that 6 RAF Harrier GR7 from No. 3 Squadron would be deployed to Afghanistan. This was the first deployment to Afghanistan of RAF fighter aircraft and they are intended to provide close air support (CAS) and reconnaissance for ISAF and Coalition forces.

== Commanders ==
The following have been UK National Contingent Commander for Operation Veritas:

- 2001 Lieutenant Colonel Henry Worsley
- September 2001 to January 2002, Air Marshal Jock Stirrup
