= Fleet solid support ship =

British Navy auxiliary vessel

A fleet solid support ship is a type of Royal Fleet Auxiliary (RFA) ship designed to supply solids (otherwise known as dry stores), such as ammunition, explosives and food, to Royal Navy ships at sea. The term can also refer to the programme to replace the RFA's existing solid support ships, the Fleet Solid Support Ship Programme.

== Current ships ==
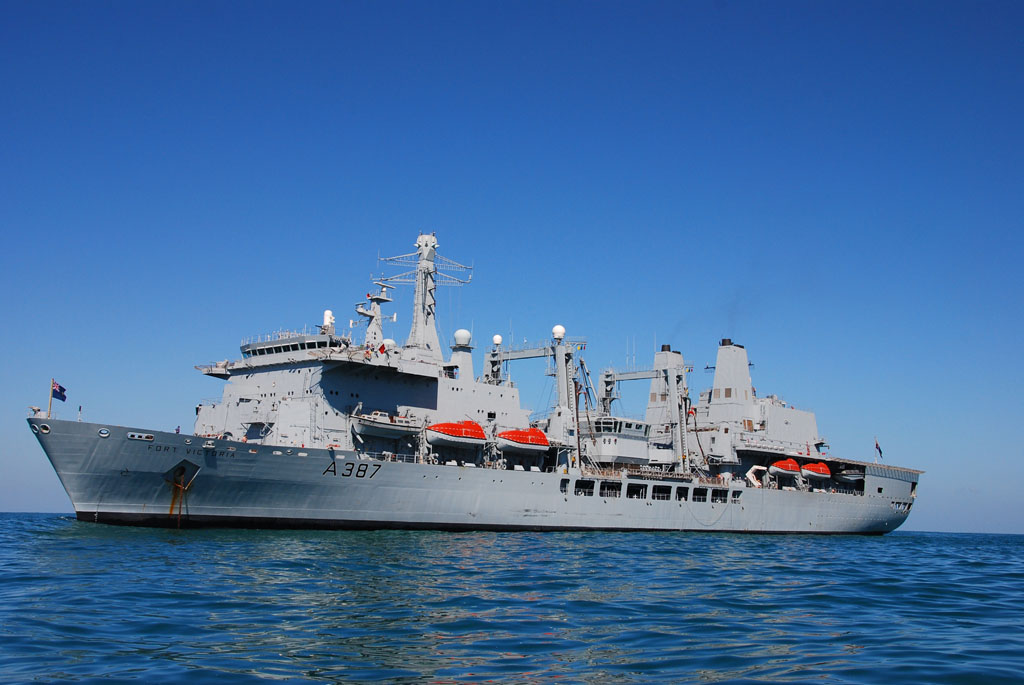
RFA Fort Victoria

The Royal Fleet Auxiliary currently operates one solid support ship: the Fort Victoria class, combined fleet stores ship and tanker, RFA Fort Victoria.

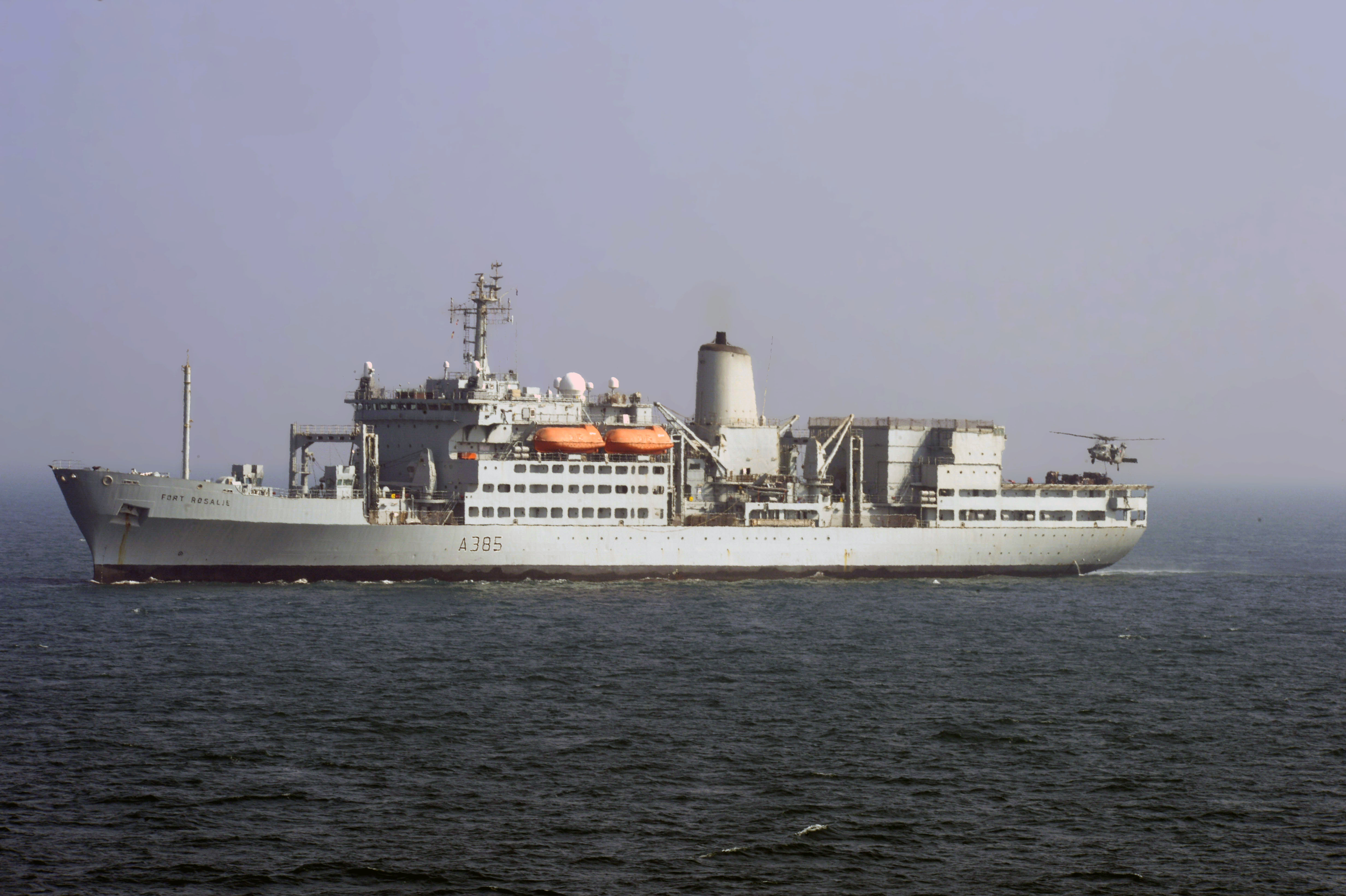
RFA Fort Rosalie

By 2021, the Fort Rosalie-class replenishment ships, (Fort Austin and Fort Rosalie), had been retired. Only RFA Fort Victoria had undergone a refit to enable her to supply the Royal Navy's new Queen Elizabeth-class aircraft carriers with solid stores. With incompatible rigs, Fort Rosalie and Fort Austin were placed in extended readiness and were later sold to the Egyptian Navy.

A programme to replace these ships, named the Military Afloat Reach and Sustainability (MARS) Fleet Solid Support (FSS), commenced in 2017, but was delayed in 2019. In May 2021, the competition was restarted to select a design within two years.

== Future ships ==
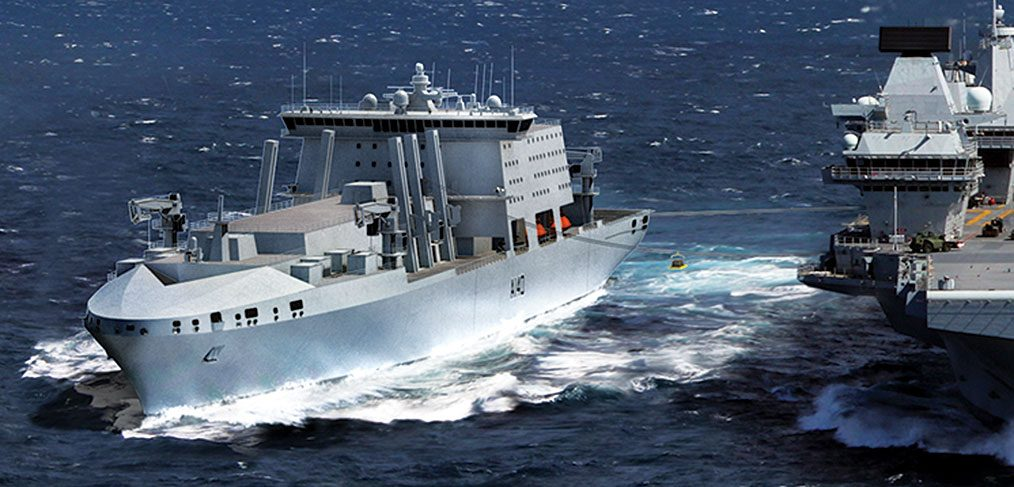
A Fleet Solid Support Ship (FSS) concept

The advent of the Queen Elizabeth-class aircraft carriers necessitated the development of a new class of solid support vessels to succeed the current, outdated, and incompatible Fort Rosalie-class replenishment ships. The Strategic Defence and Security Review 2015 affirmed the acquisition of three new large solid support vessels for the Royal Fleet Auxiliary (RFA) as a component of the Military Afloat Reach and Sustainability (MARS) Fleet Solid Support (FSS) initiative. In February 2019, Rear Admiral Paul Marshall was designated as the Senior Responsible Officer for this project.

The National Shipbuilding Strategy (NSS), which was published in September 2017, mandated that the design and construction of these vessels would undergo an international competition, allowing UK companies to compete with foreign firms to foster competitiveness. Designated as "non-warships", these vessels were mandated to be tendered on an international basis in accordance with Article 346 of the Treaty on the Functioning of the European Union (TFEU). This faced resistance from various political parties, notably the Labour and the Scottish National Party, along with trade unions like GMB and the Confederation of Shipbuilding and Engineering Unions. They expressed concerns regarding the possible job losses for British shipyards. Their suggestion was to reclassify the ships as "warships", thereby exempting them from the treaty and permitting their construction in British shipyards. Sir John Parker, a businessman whose recommendations laid the groundwork for the National Shipbuilding Strategy, also expressed criticism of the government's strategy, deeming it "not the right strategic approach". He further suggested that "competition limited to the UK should be contemplated for future vessels funded by defense."

In 2018, a contract notice was placed for two solid support ships, with a probable option of a third later. The ships required a total cargo capacity of up to 7,000 m^{3} (250,000 cu ft), the ability to travel at a sustained speed of 18 knots (33 km/h; 21 mph) without resupply, the capability of delivering non-bulk logistic material whilst underway at 12 knots (22 km/h; 14 mph) and transfer single loads of up to 5 tonnes (4.9 long tons; 5.5 short tons). A list of bidders was subsequently selected with a British consortium consisting of Babcock, BAE Systems, Cammell Laird and Rolls-Royce, as well as international bidders consisting of Fincantieri (Italy), Navantia (Spain), Japan Marine United Corporation (Japan) and Daewoo Shipbuilding and Marine Engineering (DSME) (South Korea). Fincantieri and DSME later withdrew from the bid, however Fincantieri later rejoined.

On 5 November 2019, the competition was suspended to ensure "requirements could be met" and a "value for money solution found", which raised hope from trade unions that the competition could be restarted and involve only UK shipyards.

On 21 September 2020, Secretary of State for Defence, Ben Wallace, stated the vessels were "warships", effectively confirming they would be built in the United Kingdom. On 21 October 2020, it was announced that the competition for the FSS would be re-started in Spring 2021, covering three ships and it will be an international competition but the team must be a led by a British company. In May 2021 the competition to build the ships was relaunched with the aim of taking a decision within two years. In July 2022, Rear-Admiral Paul Marshall, the Senior Responsible Officer for the Fleet Solid Support ship project, told the House of Commons Defence Select Committee that the first ship was envisaged for service entry in 2028 with the third entering service by 2032. In November 2022 it was announced that Team Resolute (BMT, Harland & Wolff and Navantia) had been selected to build the ships with the start of construction anticipated in 2025. The manufacturing contract, with a value of £1.6 billion, was signed in January 2023. It was subsequently indicated by the Ministry of Defence that the first ship's operational availability would now not be until 2031.

The Team Resolute design envisages a vessel about 216 metres (708 ft 8 in) in length with three replenishment-at-sea rigs and possessing about 9,000 square metres (97,000 sq ft) of cargo space. The ship hangars will have the capacity to support two Merlin helicopters as well as unmanned aerial vehicles. Vessel speed is envisaged at 19 knots (35 km/h; 22 mph).

In December 2025, it was revealed at the steel-cutting ceremony for the initial vessel of the three that the first ship would be designated as RFA Resurgent. The subsequent vessels are allegedly to be designated as RFA Resource and RFA Regent, respectively, but with RFA Reliant another potential option.

The first block of the lead ship, RFA Resurgent, was laid down at Navantia UK’s Appledore shipyard on 3 September 2026, marking the start of modular assembly for the Fleet Solid Support Ship programme. The bow section is being built on the barge Navantia UK Seahorse for transport to Harland & Wolff in Belfast, where it will be joined with blocks produced both locally and at Navantia’s Cádiz yard. The remaining ships in the class have been named RFA Reliant and RFA Resourceful. Delivery of the first vessel is planned for 2031.

== See also ==
- Tide-class tanker - replenishment tankers which are also part of the Military Afloat Reach and Sustainability (MARS) programme.
