= Fleet Solid Support Ship Programme =

Royal Fleet Auxiliary contract

Fleet Solid Support Ship
Class overview
- Builders: Harland and Wolff, Navantia, Belfast, United Kingdom
- Operators: Royal Fleet Auxiliary
- Preceded by: Fort Rosalie class, Fort Victoria class
- Built: 2025 to 2032 (projected)
- In service: From 2031 (projected)
- Planned: 3
- Building: 1

General characteristics
- Class & type: Fleet solid support ship
- Displacement: 39,000 long tons (39,626 t) full load
- Length: 216 m (708 ft 8 in)
- Beam: 34.5 m (113 ft 2 in)
- Propulsion: CODELOD (Combined Diesel Electric or Diesel) arrangement, 2 shafts
- Speed: 19 knots (35 km/h; 22 mph)
- Boats & landing craft carried: Port side boat bay to allow embarkation of Special Forces RIBs
- Capacity: 9,000 square metres (97,000 sq ft) of cargo space; up to 25 TEU (twenty-foot equivalent) containers on upper deck; capacity for Role 2 maritime hospital
- Complement: 101 RFA, plus space for 57 to 78 additional RN or other personnel
- Sensors & processing systems: Air search radar; Navigation radar; Helicopter control radar
- Electronic warfare & decoys: Electronic warfare systems; Soft-kill decoy launchers
- Armament: 2 × 20 mm Phalanx CIWS; 2 × 30 mm
- Aircraft carried: Capacity for 2 × Merlin helicopters (or equivalent) plus at least one UAV
- Aviation facilities: Twin hangar, Chinook-capable flight deck

The Fleet Solid Support Ship Programme (FSSP) aims to deliver up to three fleet solid support ships to the British Royal Fleet Auxiliary. The ships will be used to provide underway replenishment of dry stores, such as ammunition, spare parts and supplies, to ships of the Royal Navy. They will regularly deploy with the UK Carrier Strike Group, providing crucial supplies to the Queen Elizabeth-class aircraft carriers and their escorts. All three ships had been scheduled to enter service between 2028 and 2032. However, subsequently the Ministry of Defence indicated that the first ship would in fact not be operational until 2031.

The ships were first proposed by the British government in 2015 as part of the Strategic Defence and Security Review. In the subsequent National Shipbuilding Strategy, the government outlined its intentions to tender the ships internationally to encourage competitiveness with British shipyards. This was criticised by some political parties and trade unions as being a potential loss of British shipbuilding jobs and skills. Following a competition, which began in 2018, Team Resolute was awarded a contract for the three vessels; BMT Group will provide the design, whilst Harland & Wolff and Navantia UK will construct them.

In December 2025, it was announced during the steel-cutting ceremony for the first of the three ships that the first ship would be named RFA Resurgent. In September 2026, the first section of RFA Resurgent was formally laid down at Navantia's Appledore shipyard.

== Background ==
In November 2015, the British government published the Strategic Defence and Security Review which outlined a commitment to three new solid support ships by 2025. The ships are replacements for the RFA's Fort Victoria-class and Fort Rosalie-class fleet solid support ships which had grown increasingly obsolete; one ship, RFA Fort Victoria, underwent modernisation in 2017, which made her the only fleet solid support ship compatible with the new Queen Elizabeth-class aircraft carriers, whilst the remaining ships were withdrawn from service.

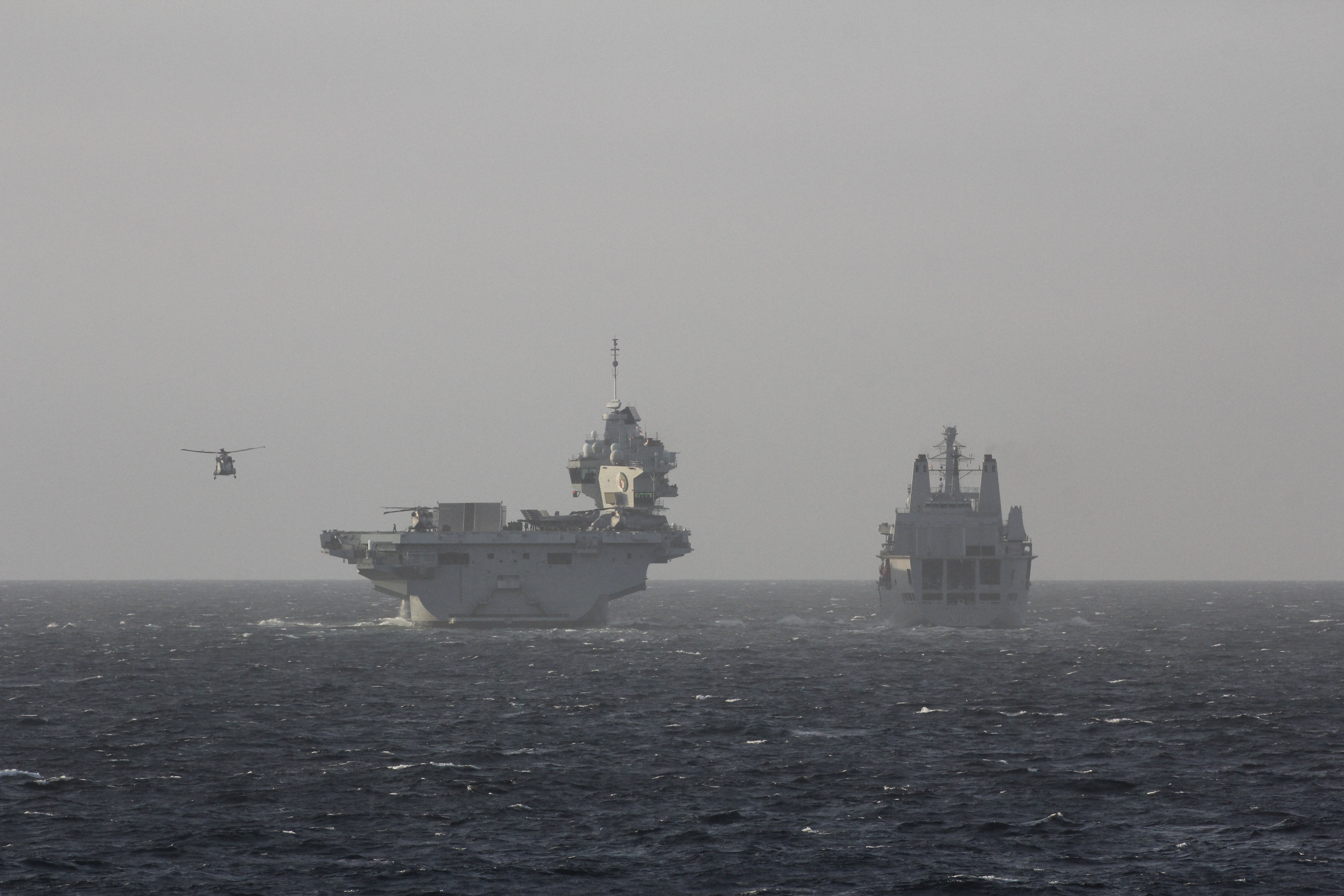
Fleet solid support ship RFA Fort Victoria alongside aircraft carrier HMS Queen Elizabeth in 2020.

In the National Shipbuilding Strategy, published in 2017, the government stated that the contract for the ships would be subject to an international competition, pitting UK firms against those overseas in order to encourage competitiveness. The government also described the ships as "non-warships", which allowed them to be tendered internationally under the European Union's Treaty on the Functioning of the European Union (TFEU).

The government's strategy was criticised as a potential loss of British skills and jobs by opposition political parties and trade unions, such as GMB and the Confederation of Shipbuilding and Engineering Unions. They argued that the ships should be reclassified as warships and therefore made exempt from the treaty. Sir John Parker, whose recommendations formed the basis for the National Shipbuilding Strategy, also criticised it as "not the right strategic approach" and recommended that "UK-only competition should be considered for future defence-funded vessels".

== Development ==
=== Contract ===
In November 2018, a list of bidders was selected for the FSS contract which consisted of a British consortium comprising Babcock, BAE Systems, Cammell Laird and Rolls-Royce, in addition to international bidders, including Fincantieri (Italy), Navantia (Spain), Japan Marine United Corporation (Japan) and Daewoo Shipbuilding & Marine Engineering (South Korea). Fincantieri and Daewoo Shipbuilding & Marine Engineering later withdrew from the competition, but Fincantieri subsequently rejoined.

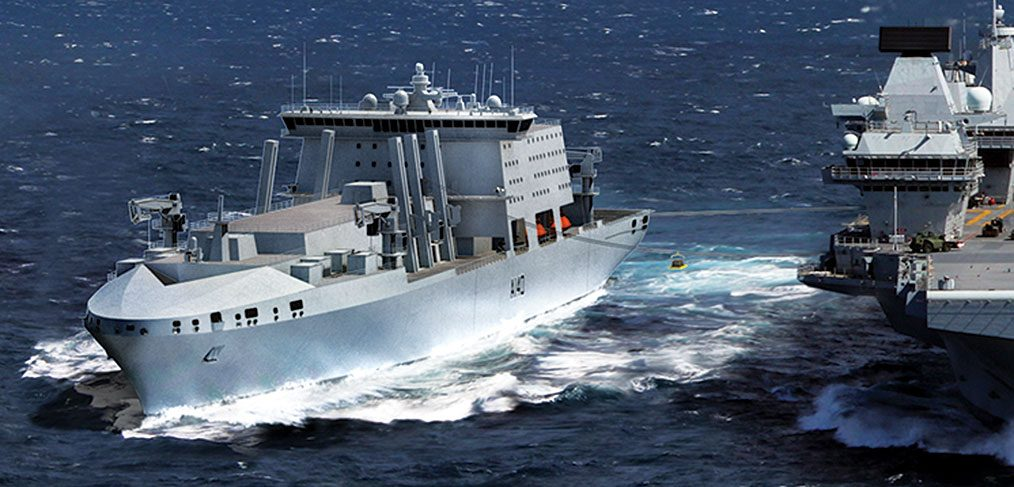
Fleet Solid Support Ship Proposal

The competition was suspended on 5 November 2019 to ensure "requirements could be met" and a "value for money solution found", which raised hopes from trade unions that the competition would be restarted with only British firms involved. In the following month, then Secretary of State for Defence Ben Wallace made a statement describing the ships as "warships" and later confirmed that they would be built "with British involvement".

A restart for the competition was announced for Spring 2021, involving multi-national consortia led by British companies. In May 2021, the competition was relaunched with a winner to be selected within two years. In July 2022, Rear Admiral Paul Marshall, the Senior Responsible Officer for programme, told the Defence Select Committee that the first ship was envisaged for service entry in 2028 with the third entering service by 2032. However, subsequently the Ministry of Defence indicated that the first ship would in fact not be operational until 2031.

In September 2021, contracts were awarded to four consortia, each involving British companies, to further develop their bids. These were Larsen & Toubro (involving the UK company Leidos Innovations), Serco/Damen (involving UK company Serco), Team Resolute (involving UK companies Harland & Wolff (H&W) and BMT, along with Navantia UK, a British subsidiary of Spain's Navantia) and Team UK (involving UK companies BAE Systems and Babcock).

In November 2022, it was announced that Team Resolute had been selected as the preferred bidder for the £1.6 billion contract. Navantia UK was confirmed as the prime contractor with the ships being fully assembled in Harland & Wolff's shipyard in Belfast. To alleviate concerns from some MPs and trade unions, the CEO of Harland & Wolff, John Wood, stated that the ships would have a minimum of 60% UK content. The contract will create 1,200 jobs across the UK and a further 800 across the supply chain. It will also mark the return of shipbuilding in Belfast, which has been largely dormant since 2003. The manufacturing contract, with a value of £1.6 billion, was formally signed in January 2023.

=== Construction ===
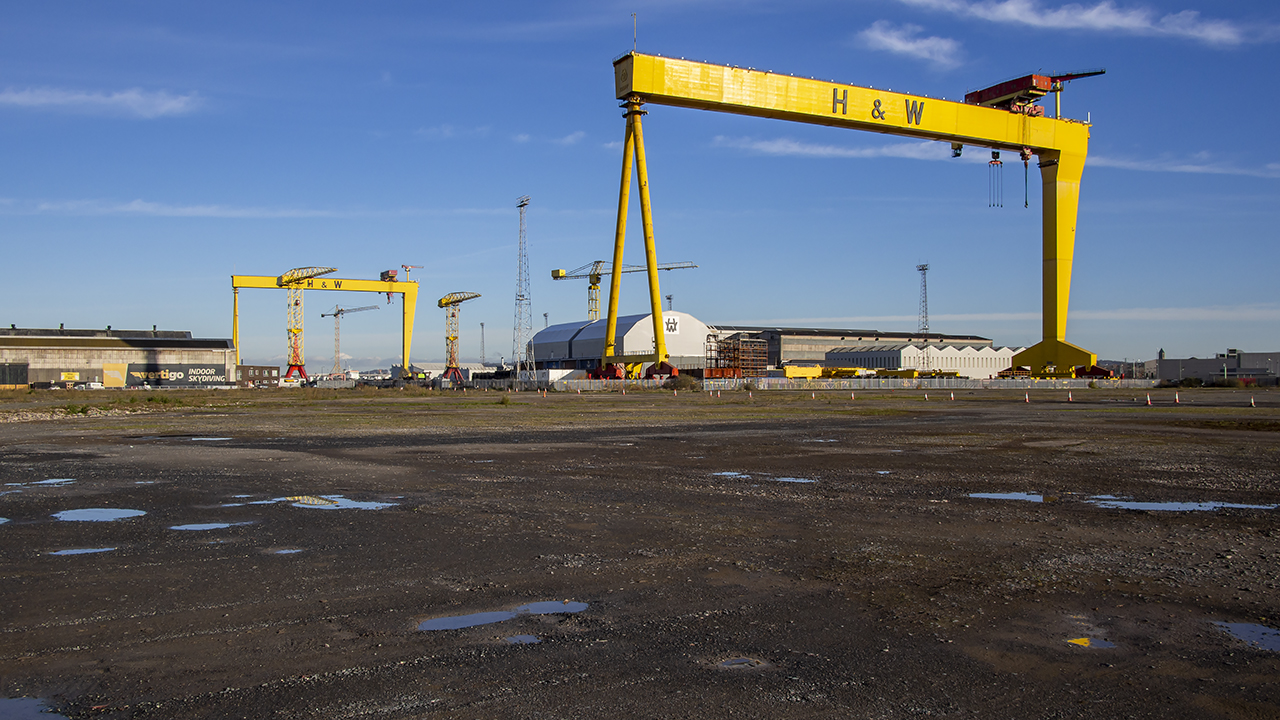
Harland & Wolff, Belfast

The preliminary design review is reportedly to be completed in early 2024 with detailed design work to follow. The ships will be constructed in blocks at H&W's facilities in Belfast and Appledore from components manufactured at their facilities in Methil and Arnish. Major build work will also take place at Navantia's shipyard in Cádiz, Spain. Final assembly of all the blocks will take place at the H&W shipyard in Belfast. In April 2024, the MOD stated that some design work was still ongoing and construction of the first ship is due to begin in 2025.

Construction officially began on the first ship, RFA Resurgent, on the 3 December 2025, in a steel-cutting ceremony at the Appledore shipyard in Devon.

The first block of the lead ship, RFA Resurgent, was formally laid down at Navantia UK’s Appledore shipyard on 3 September 2026, ahead of the original schedule following reports that the Ministry of Defence had requested accelerated delivery of the Fleet Solid Support vessels. The keel‑laying marked the start of modular assembly, with the bow section constructed directly on the 1,400‑tonne barge Navantia UK Seahorse for transport to Harland & Wolff in Belfast, where it will be integrated with blocks fabricated both locally and at Navantia’s Cádiz yard to form the 216‑metre, 39,000‑tonne ship.

The remaining ships in the class were confirmed as RFA Reliant and RFA Resourceful. Under the current schedule, Resurgent is planned for delivery in 2031, with the refurbished RFA Fort Victoria intended to temporarily regenerate solid stores replenishment skills for the first crew.

== Characteristics ==
According to a May 2018 contract notice, the ships require a total cargo capacity of up to 7,000 m^{3} (250,000 cu ft), the ability to travel at a sustained speed of 18 knots (33 km/h; 21 mph) without resupply, the capability of delivering non-bulk logistic material whilst underway at 12 knots and transfer single loads of up to 5 tonnes. As part of Team Resolute, BMT will provide the design for the ships, the latest iteration of which features a length of 216 metres (709 ft), three replenishment rigs, a Replenishment at Sea Control/Coordination (RASCO) station sited amidships and container handling capabilities situated forward. The ships will be capable of 19 knots (35 km/h; 22 mph) and will have 9,000 square metres (97,000 sq ft) of cargo space for stores. The ships' hangars will be able to accommodate two Merlin helicopters, with further accommodation for UAVs.

== Ships in class ==
Name	Pennant	Image	Builder	Ordered	Laid down	Launched	Commissioned	Status
RFA Resurgent			Navantia/Harland & Wolff	January 2023	3 September 2026		Projected 2031	Under construction
RFA Reliant			Navantia/Harland & Wolff	January 2023			Projected Early 2030s	Ordered
RFA Resourceful			Navantia/Harland & Wolff	January 2023			Projected Early 2030s	Ordered
