= Fort Rosalie-class replenishment ship =

Class of fleet replenishment vessel of the Royal Fleet Auxiliary

Fort Rosalie class
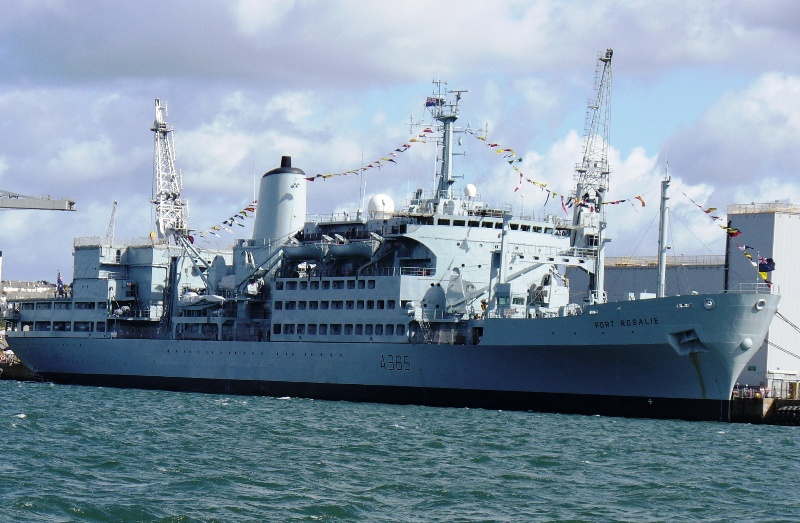
- RFA Fort Rosalie at HMNB Plymouth Navy Days

Class overview
- Builders: Scott Lithgow
- Operators: Royal Fleet Auxiliary
- Succeeded by: Fort Victoria class
- Built: 1973–1979
- In commission: 1978–2021
- Completed: 2
- Retired: 2 (sold to Egypt)

General characteristics
- Type: Replenishment ship
- Tonnage: 18,029 GT
- Displacement: 23,890 tons (full load)
- Length: 185.1 m (607 ft 3 in)
- Beam: 24 m (78 ft 9 in)
- Draught: 9 m (29 ft 6 in)
- Propulsion: Sulzer 8-cylinder RND90 22,300 shp (16,600 kW), 1 shaft
- Speed: 22 knots (41 km/h; 25 mph)
- Range: 10,000 nmi (19,000 km; 12,000 mi) at 20 kn (37 km/h; 23 mph)
- Complement: 127 RFA; 45 RN; 36 STO(N) civilians
- Sensors & processing systems: Kelvin Hughes Ltd SharpEye navigation radar
- Armament: 2 × 20 mm Phalanx CIWS; 2 × 20 mm Oerlikon/BMARC KAA guns in GAM-B01 mounts; 4 × 7.62 mm L7 GPMGs
- Aircraft carried: Up to 4 × Westland Sea King-sized helicopters

The Fort Rosalie or Fort class of fleet replenishment vessel of the British Royal Fleet Auxiliary were designed to replenish Royal Navy taskgroups with various armaments and victualling stores while under way. Unlike the bigger Fort Victoria class, they supply dry stores and not fuel. RFA Fort Rosalie was originally known as Fort Grange but was renamed in 2000 to avoid confusion with the new Fort Victoria-class replenishment oiler RFA Fort George. Both ships were withdrawn from service and later sold in 2021.

== Design ==
They have the capacity to store 3,500 long tons (3,600 t) of stores, including refrigerated items, in four holds. They are capable of replenishment at sea (RAS), using three 10-ton and three 5-ton cranes and vertical replenishment (VERTREP). For the latter role there are generous flight facilities; a single spot flight deck, an emergency landing platform atop the hangar and a complement of up to four (but usually one) Fleet Air Arm Westland Sea King helicopters and the requisite maintenance facilities. As such, they are often used for aviation training.

== History ==
Two ships were ordered in 1971, with the first entering service in 1978. Both ships saw service in the Falklands War, the then Fort Grange being shadowed by Argentine Air Force C-130 Hercules aircraft while still 1,000 nautical miles (1,900 km) from the combat area and Fort Austin being attacked while sitting in San Carlos Water. Fort Austin supported the British intervention in Sierra Leone in 2000.

Fort Austin was mothballed in 2009 but was reactivated following the 2010 SDSR at the expense of RFA Fort George. Both Fort Rosalie and Fort Austin have had major refits at Cammell Laird to enable another decade of service. In 2011 it was announced that the service lives of Fort Austin and Fort Rosalie would be extended by another two years to 2023 and 2024 respectively. They will ultimately be replaced by the new Solid Support Ships.

As of June 2020, both ships were reported to be in either reduced (base maintenance period) or extended readiness (unmanned reserve) with replenishment rigs not compatible with the Queen Elizabeth-class aircraft carriers.

The 2021 defence white paper announced that both ships of the class would be decommissioned and eventually replaced by new Fleet Solid Stores Support Vessels. In May 2021, both ships were put up for sale to be scrapped. The notice for recycling was subsequently withdrawn, and in October 2021 it was announced by the Defence Equipment Sales Authority and Defence Equipment and Support that both ships of the class had been sold to the Egyptian Navy, with refurbishment work expected to be undertaken by Cammell Laird prior to their export. While awaiting their refit, it was reported that Fort Austin would be renamed ENS Luxor and Fort Rosalie would be renamed ENS Abu Simbel.

== Ships ==
Name	Pennant	Builder	Commissioned	Status
Fort Rosalie (ex-Fort Grange)	A385	Scott Lithgow, Greenock	6 April 1978	Decommissioned 31 March 2021, sold to Egypt October 2021 Renamed ENS Abu Simbel
Fort Austin	A386	Scott Lithgow, Greenock	11 May 1979	Decommissioned 31 March 2021, sold to Egypt October 2021

== See also ==
- List of replenishment ships of the Royal Fleet Auxiliary
