= RFA Fort Rosalie (A385) =

Lead ship of her class of replenishment ship of the Royal Fleet Auxiliary

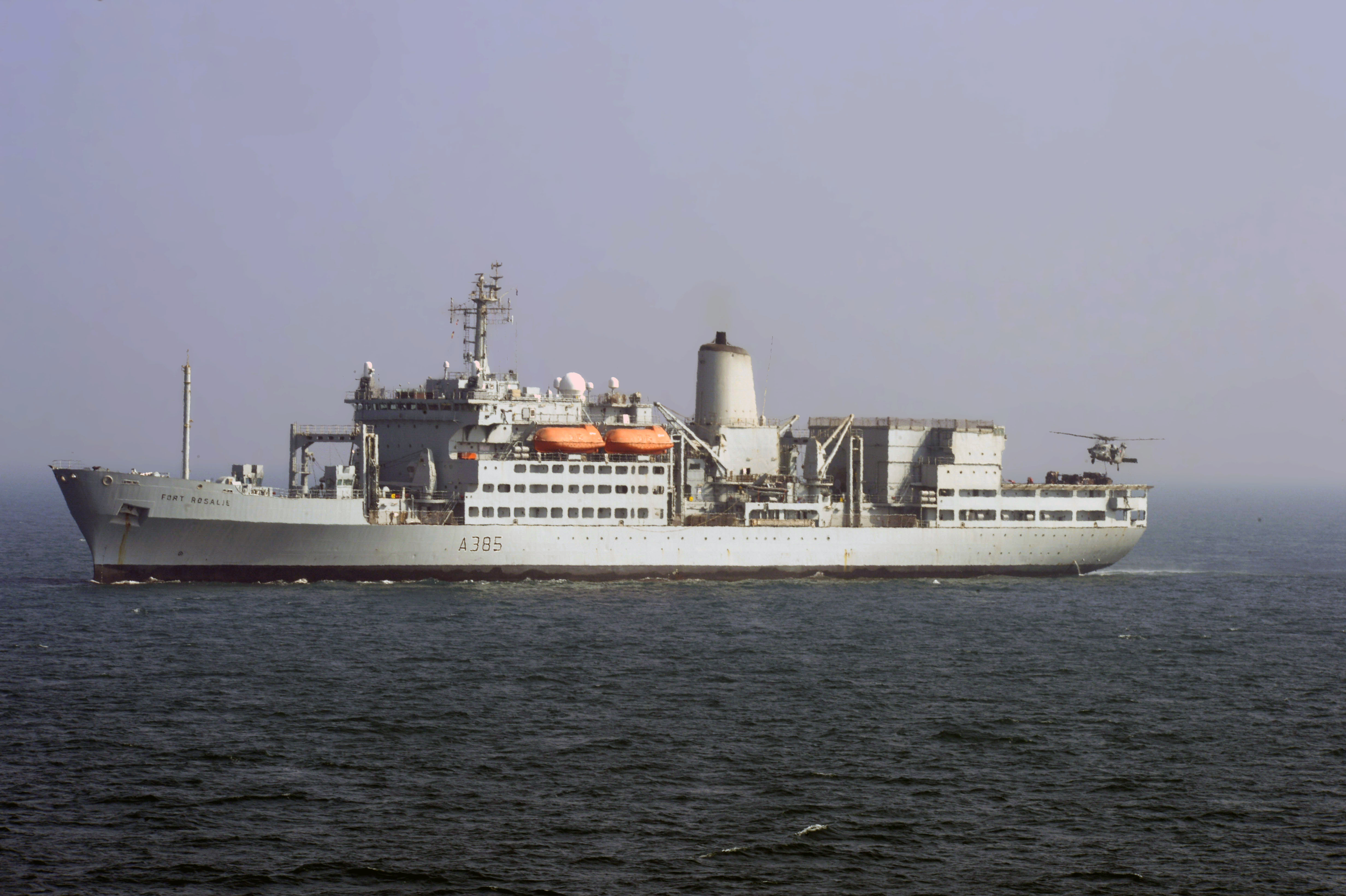
- Fort Rosalie in the Arabian Sea, in February 2018

History

United Kingdom
- Name: RFA Fort Rosalie
- Operator: Royal Fleet Auxiliary
- Ordered: November 1971
- Builder: Scott Lithgow
- Laid down: 9 November 1973
- Launched: 9 December 1976
- Commissioned: 6 April 1978
- Out of service: 31 March 2021
- Refit: 20 May 2008
- Home port: Marchwood Military Port, Southampton
- Identification: IMO number: 7341283; MMSI number: 233063000; Callsign: GSEU; Pennant number: A385
- Status: Decommissioned; sold to Egypt

General characteristics
- Class & type: Fort Rosalie-class replenishment ship
- Type: Stores Ship
- Displacement: 23,384 tons
- Length: 185.1 m (607 ft 3 in)
- Beam: 24 m (78 ft 9 in)
- Draught: 9 m (29 ft 6 in)
- Speed: 22 knots (40.7 km/h)
- Complement: 114 RFA; 36 RNSTS; additional 45 RN Air Squadron personnel
- Armament: 2 × Phalanx 1b CIWS; 2 × 20 mm GAM-BO1; 4 × 7.62 mm GPMGs

Service record
- Commanders: Captain Ross Ferris, OBE, MVO
- Operations: Falklands War; Yugoslav wars; Afghanistan War

RFA Fort Rosalie was the lead ship of her class of Royal Fleet Auxiliary fleet replenishment ships. Fort Rosalie was originally named RFA Fort Grange, but was renamed in May 2000 to avoid confusion with the now-decommissioned RFA Fort George. On 31 March 2021, the ship was withdrawn from service.

== Construction and design ==
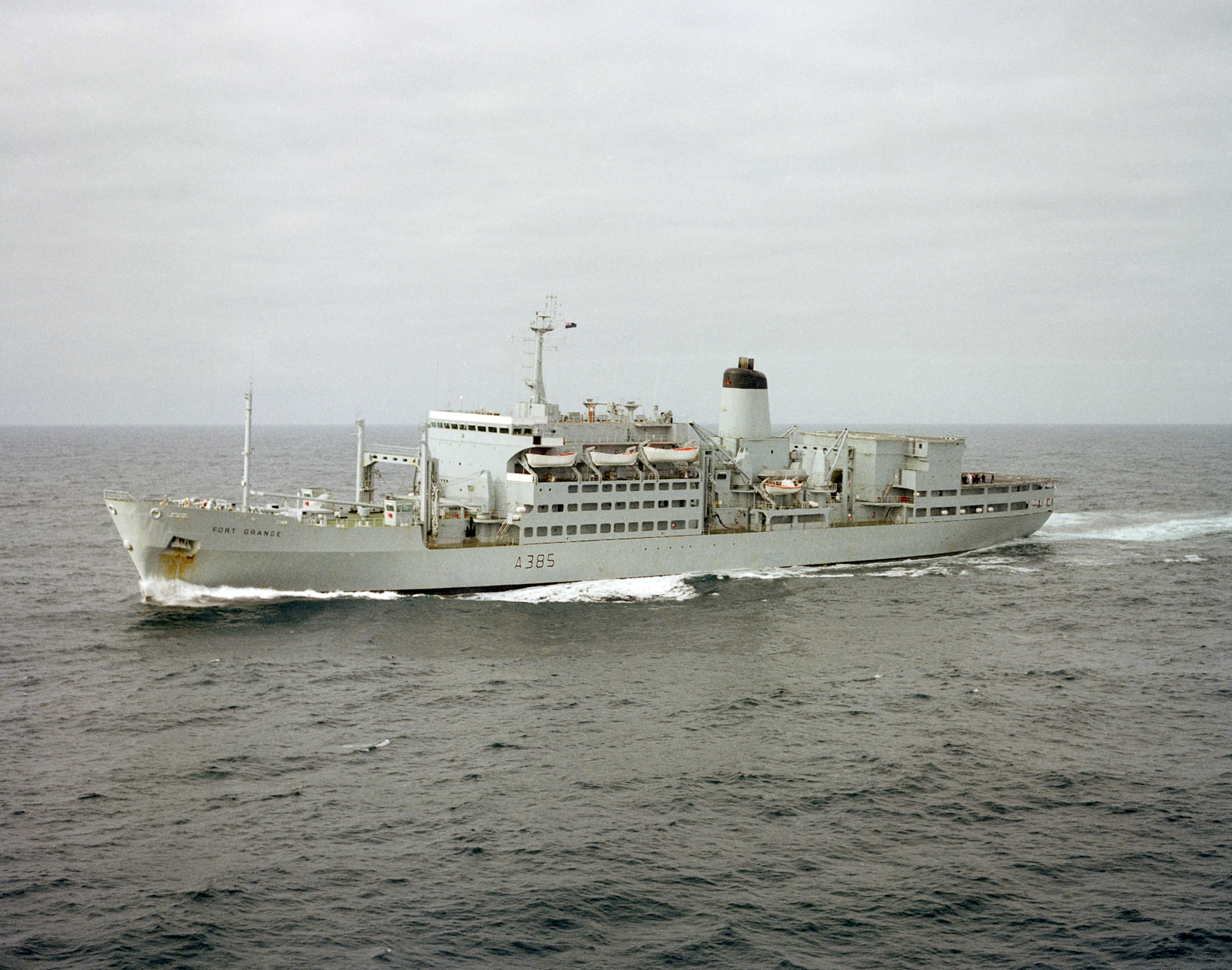
RFA Fort Grange in 1982.

In November 1971, two Fleet Replenishment ships of a new class were ordered for the Royal Fleet Auxiliary. Fort Grange was laid down by the shipbuilder Scott Lithgow at their shipyard at Greenock on the River Clyde on 9 November 1973, was launched on 9 December 1976 and commissioned on 6 April 1978.

The ship is 603 feet (183.8 m) long overall, and 557 feet 9 inches (170.0 m) length between perpendiculars, with a beam of 79 feet (24.1 m) and a draught of 28 feet 2 inches (8.6 m). Displacement is 22,800 long tons (23,200 t) full load, with a gross register tonnage of 16079 t, a net register tonnage of 6729 t and a deadweight tonnage of 8300 t. The ship is powered by a single 8-cylinder Sulzer RND80 diesel engine, rated at 23,200 brake horsepower (17,300 kW), which drive a single propeller shaft, giving a speed of 22 knots (25 mph; 41 km/h). She has a range of 10,000 nautical miles (12,000 mi; 19,000 km) at 20 knots (23 mph; 37 km/h).

Up to 3500 tons of weapons, food and other naval stores can be carried in four holds with a volume of 12,800 cubic metres (450,000 cu ft). Three stations for alongside replenishment are provided on each beam of the ship. A large hangar and flight deck are located aft, which were designed to accommodate up to four Westland Sea King helicopters for vertical replenishment or for anti-submarine duties, although typically the ship only carries a single helicopter in peacetime. The ship has a crew of 140 RFA personnel who man the ship, 36 Royal Navy personnel who operated and support the ship's helicopters and 45 civilian supply staff.

== Service ==
The ship saw her first war service during the Falklands War. She was undergoing refit when Argentina invaded the Falklands in April 1982, but the refit was completed early, and Fort Grange left Devonport on 14 May 1982 to join the task force, carrying three Sea Kings of 824 Naval Air Squadron. She joined up with the fleet on 3 June, replenishing the ships of the fleet and forces on shore, as well as acting as a refuelling station for helicopters. She remained on station after the end of hostilities, and one of her helicopters was lost following an engine failure on 11 June, but all the crew were saved. Fort Grange set off for home on 17 September and reached Devonport on 3 October 1982.

In April 1994, Fort Grange was deployed alongside at the port of Split in Croatia, relieving Resource in supporting British forces carrying out peacekeeping duties in the Balkans for seven months. She resumed the support depot role at Split in April 1997, remaining on station until 6 January 2000, when she set out to return to the United Kingdom. Fort Rosalie also oversaw repairs to HMS Tireless at Gibraltar later in 2000. She is affiliated to Tamworth and Lichfield Sea Cadets under her former name, Fort Grange. In 2002 she supported HMS York during the response to 911.She provided the destroyer with fuel and stores whist York operated on operation veritas.

Fort Rosalie attended the HMNB Devonport Navy Days in August 2006, representing the Royal Fleet Auxiliary.

In May 2008 the ship entered a £28 million refit at Northwestern Shiprepairers & Shipbuilders' Cammell Laird yard in Birkenhead.

Fort Rosalie supported Exercise Cougar 11, the first partial deployment of the Royal Navy's Response Force Task Group. In 2011 it was announced that her service life would be extended by two years to 2024; the Fort class will ultimately be replaced by the Fleet Solid Support element of the Military Afloat Reach and Sustainability programme.

She spent early 2012 in the Caribbean and made a brief deployment to the Gulf of Oman in December 2012; since then she was exercising in home waters and entered refit in 2013. In June 2020, Fort Rosalie was reported to be in extended readiness (reserve) with replenishment rigs incompatible with the Royal Navy's Queen Elizabeth-class aircraft carriers. The Integrated Review of 2020 announced that Fort Rosalie, along with Fort Austin would be decommissioned, with successors from the Fleet Solid Support plan set to replace the ships.

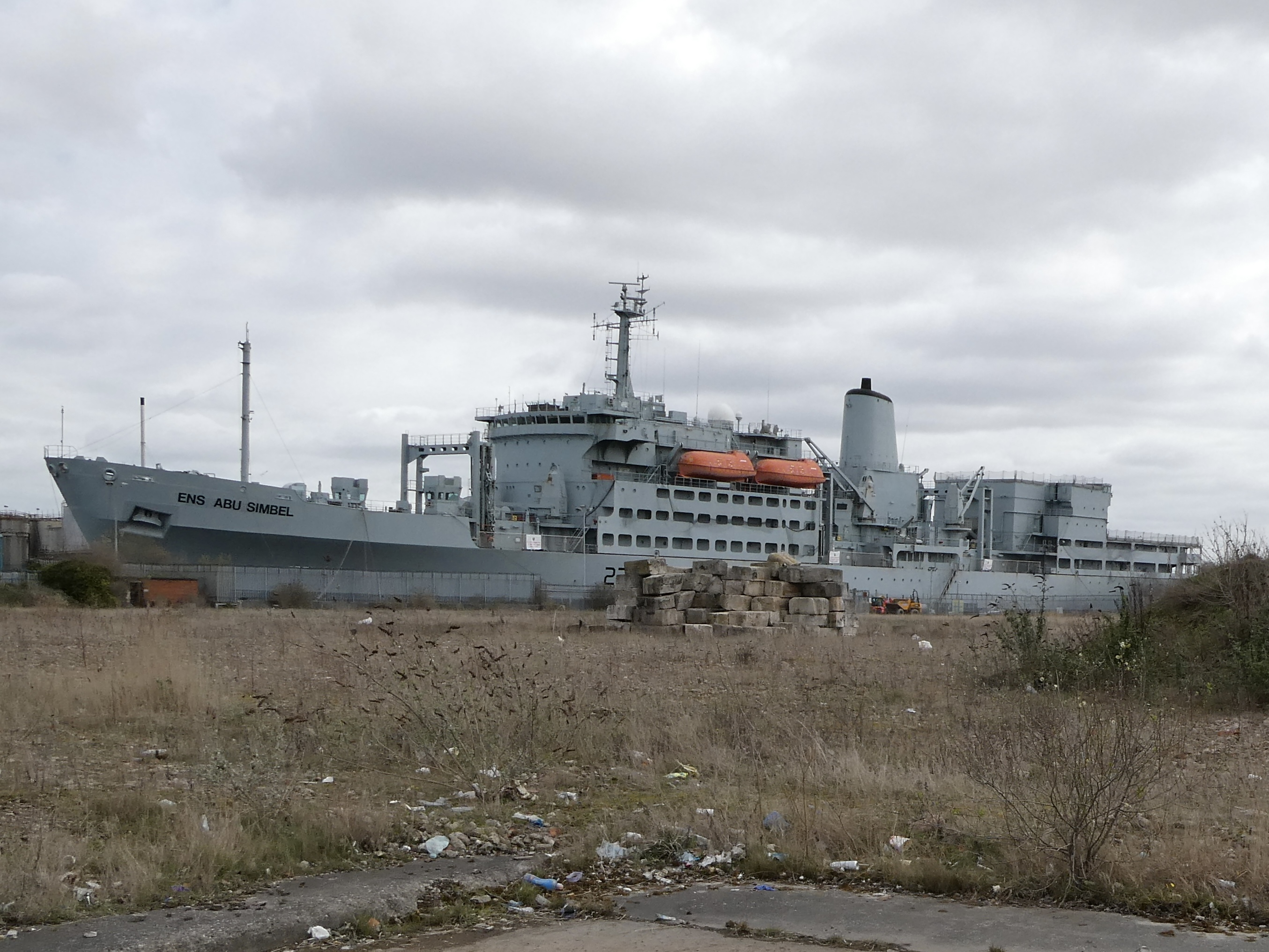
Renamed ENS Abu Simbel, berthed in Wallasey in 2023

On 31 March 2021, RFA Fort Rosalie was withdrawn from service, and offered for sale on 21 May 2021, along with sister ship RFA Fort Austin, for recycling, however in October 2021 it was announced that the ship, together with her sister ship, had been sold to Egypt. While awaiting refit, it was reported that Fort Rosalie would be renamed ENS Abu Simbel which was carried out at Liverpool Cruise Terminal on 17 July 2022.
