= RFA Fort Austin =

1979 Fort Rosalie-class replenishment ship of the Royal Fleet Auxiliary

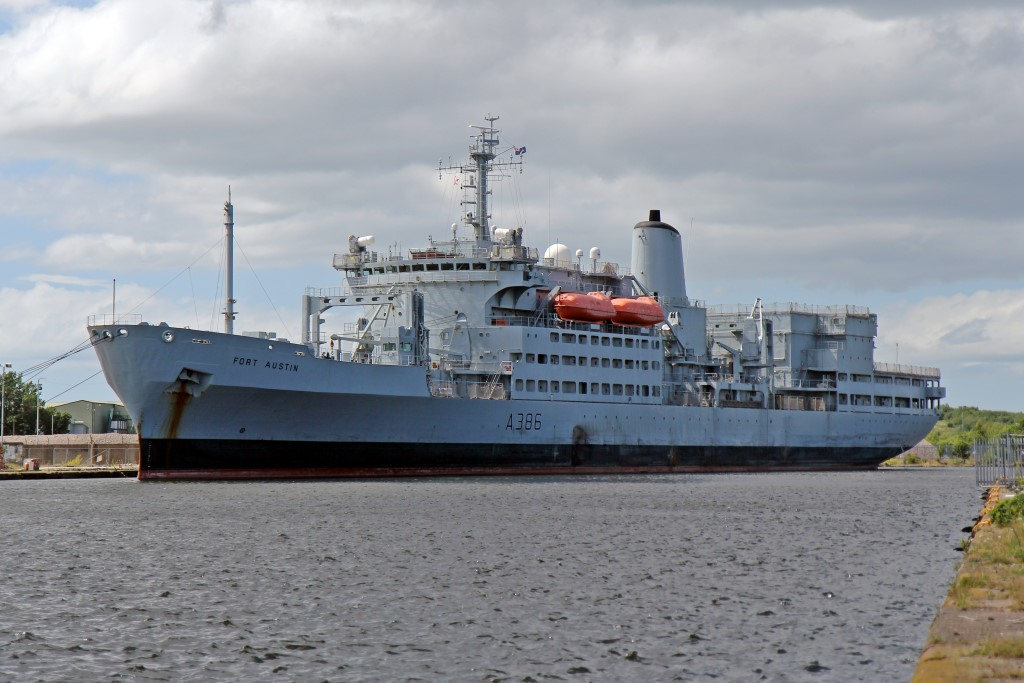
- RFA Fort Austin at West Float, Birkenhead, in July 2015

History

United Kingdom
- Name: RFA Fort Austin
- Operator: Royal Fleet Auxiliary
- Ordered: November 1971
- Builder: Scott Lithgow
- Laid down: 9 December 1975
- Launched: 9 March 1978
- Commissioned: 11 May 1979
- Out of service: 31 March 2021
- Home port: Marchwood Military Port, Southampton
- Identification: IMO number: 7342938; MMSI number: 233261000; Callsign: GSEV; Pennant number: A386
- Fate: Sold to Egypt October 2021

General characteristics
- Class & type: Fort Rosalie-class replenishment ship
- Displacement: 23,482 tonnes
- Length: 185.1 m (607 ft 3 in)
- Beam: 24 m (78 ft 9 in)
- Draught: 9 m (29 ft 6 in)
- Propulsion: Sulzer 8-cylinder RND90 22,300 shp
- Speed: 21 knots (38.9 km/h)
- Complement: 114 RFA; 36 RNSTS (historically); 45 RN Air Squadron personnel
- Armament: 2 × Phalanx CIWS; 2 × 20 mm GAM-BO1; 4 × 7.62 mm GPMGs

Service record
- Operations: Falklands War; Operation Palliser

RFA Fort Austin is a retired British Fort Rosalie-class dry stores ship of the Royal Fleet Auxiliary.

Fort Austin was laid down at Scott Lithgow in 1975, launched in 1978 and commissioned in 1979. These ships were designed to carry a wide range of dry stores to support fleet task forces; ammunition, food, explosives. They have extensive aviation facilities, with two flight decks, one to the stern and one spot on top of the hangar, up to four Sea Kings can be stored in the large hangar. These ships also have the capability to replenish ships at sea, via six RAS points.

== Operational history ==
=== Falklands War 1982 ===
When the Falklands War began, the ship was deployed in the western Mediterranean for the annual Spring Train exercise, and received orders to head south, taking part in the landings at San Carlos Water as a stores and ammunition ship. When the order to head south was given, several warships had the WE.177A nuclear weapon on board. Amongst these were the Type 22 frigates HMS Broadsword and HMS Brilliant and the aircraft carriers HMS Hermes and HMS Invincible. Some newspaper reports also named RFA Fort Austin.

The Ministry of Defence explored various options to transfer these nuclear weapons from the frigates to the safety of the deep magazines aboard Fort Austin, Hermes and Invincible. An MoD publication describes a complex series of manoeuvres to keep the nuclear warheads in areas that would honour the British obligation to the Treaty of Tlatelolco, often referred to as the Latin-America Nuclear Free Zone. In no circumstances could ships carrying nuclear weapons enter territorial waters around the Falkland Islands. After the conflict ended, weapons were transferred at sea to the two RFAs Fort Austin and Resource for transport back to Britain.

=== 2000s ===
In 2000, the ship supported the British military intervention in the Sierra Leone Civil War.

Beginning in September 2007, the ship underwent a major refit and modernization at the A&P Tyne shipyard in Hebburn, Tyne and Wear.

In July 2009, RFA Fort Austin was decommissioned and placed in reserve at Portsmouth Naval Base. Following the Strategic Defence and Security Review of October 2010 it was decided to reactivate her at the expense of the larger RFA Fort George, which would be decommissioned.

=== 2010s ===
On 27 May 2011 Fort Austin left Portsmouth under tow by the Belgian tug Union Wrestler and tug Svitzer Pembroke for a £40m refit at Cammell Laird in Birkenhead. This refit was intended to keep her in service until 2021. Later that year it was announced that her service life would be extended until 2023; the Fort class will ultimately be replaced by the Fleet Solid Support element of the Military Afloat Reach and Sustainability programme.

She left Birkenhead on 5 September 2012, arriving three days later at DM Crombie in the Firth of Forth. She arrived back in Plymouth at the end of 2012 and spent early 2013 exercising in home waters. Fort Austin formed part of the COUGAR 13 task group, providing stores, fuel, water, and ammunition Fort Austin is also participating in the 2014 IMCMEX.

In 2015, Fort Austin was again laid up, this time in Birkenhead. Despite concerns she would be decommissioned she entered Cammell Laird for refit in 2017 and it was confirmed her planned out of service date had been revised to 2024. During the course of the refit, on 15 August 2017, Fort Austin suffered a fire on the upper deck. Her 60 crew were evacuated. The damage was not considered to be serious.

=== 2020s ===
In June 2020, Fort Austin was reported to be in extended readiness (reserve) with replenishment rigs not compatible with the Queen Elizabeth-class aircraft carriers. The defence white paper of 2021 announced that Fort Austin, along with Fort Rosalie, was to be decommissioned, with successors from the Fleet Solid Support plan set to replace the ships.

On 31 March 2021, the ship was withdrawn from service, and placed up for sale (recycling) on 21 May 2021, however, the notice for recycling was then withdrawn and the ship was sold to Egypt together with her sister ship, Fort Rosalie. While awaiting refit, it was reported that Fort Austin would be renamed ENS Luxor.
