= Fort Victoria-class replenishment oiler =

Class of two replenishment oilers of the Royal Fleet Auxiliary

- Fort Victoria

Class overview
- Name: Fort Victoria class
- Builders: Harland & Wolff : Fort Victoria; Swan Hunter : Fort George
- Operators: Royal Navy
- Preceded by: Fort Rosalie-class replenishment ship
- Succeeded by: Fleet Solid Support Ship Programme
- Built: 1988–1991
- In commission: 1993–present
- Planned: 6
- Completed: 2
- Cancelled: 4
- Active: 1
- Scrapped: 1

General characteristics
- Class & type: Replenishment oiler
- Displacement: 32,300 long tons (32,818 t) full load
- Length: 203 m (666 ft 0 in)
- Beam: 30 m (98 ft 5 in)
- Draught: 10 m (32 ft 10 in)
- Propulsion: 2 shafts, Crossley-Pielstick V-16 diesels, 23,904 bhp (17,825 kW)
- Speed: 20 knots (37 km/h; 23 mph)
- Complement: 95 RFA / 15 RN / 154 FAA / 24 RNSTS civilians
- Sensors & processing systems: Radar Type 993 3D surveillance; Kelvin Hughes Ltd SharpEye navigation radar
- Electronic warfare & decoys: NATO Seagnat countermeasures launchers; Type 182 towed decoy
- Armament: 2 × 20 mm Phalanx CIWS; 2 × 20 mm Oerlikon / BMARC KAA guns in GAM-B01 mounts; (Sea Wolf SAM VLS; originally envisaged but never fit)
- Aircraft carried: Up to 5 × Sea King or Merlin helicopters (3 in hangar)

The Fort Victoria or Fort II class is a class of replenishment oiler of the Royal Fleet Auxiliary, a role that combines the missions of a tanker and stores supply ship. As such they are designated auxiliary oiler replenisher (AOR). They are tasked with providing ammunition, fuel, food and other supplies to Royal Navy vessels around the world. There were two ships in the class, Fort Victoria and Fort George; the latter being taken out of service and despatched for scrapping at a Turkish breakers as a consequence of budgetary cutbacks.

== History ==
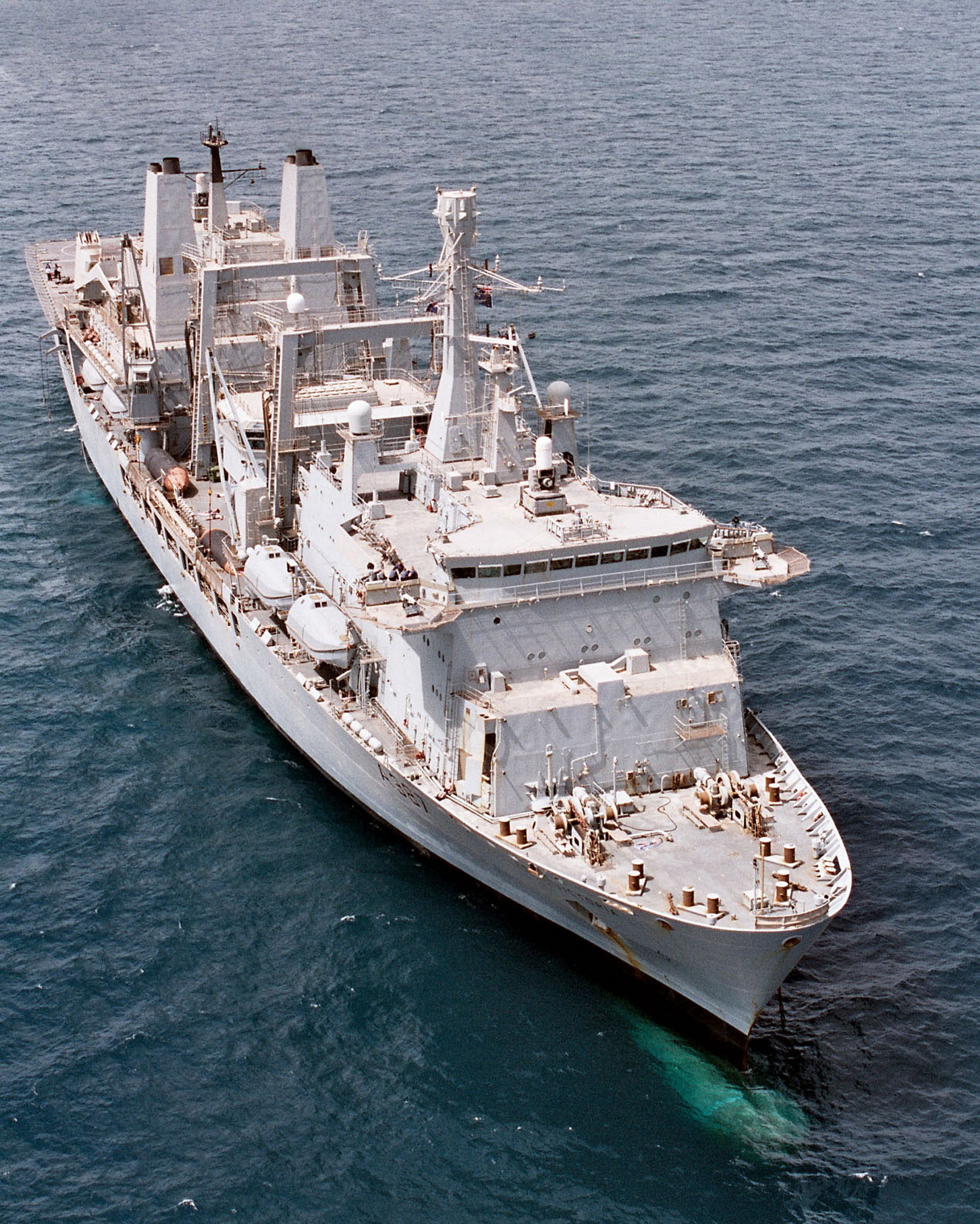
Fort Victoria in 2003

Six ships were initially planned to supply the Type 23 frigates in their North Atlantic anti-submarine role. The Type 23 was at the time planned to be a low cost, lightly armed vessel and the Fort-class ships were therefore expected to defend themselves with the Sea Wolf vertical launch surface-to-air missile (SAM).

The lessons of the Falklands War meant the Type 23 developed as a much more potent, multi-role vessel carrying the Sea Wolf missile. The requirement for the Fort class was reduced from six to two.

Fort Victoria was built by Harland & Wolff and Fort George by Swan Hunter and the ships entered service in 1994 and 1993 respectively. Fort Victoria was delayed when she was bombed by the IRA on 6 September 1990 and nearly sunk.

Fort George was retired in 2011 while Fort Victoria was relegated to "extended readiness" (uncrewed reserve) status in 2024. She was taken in hand for reactivation in 2026 in order to serve as a "bridge" capability in advance of the entry into service of new solid stores support ships in the 2030s. Fort Victoria will be succeeded by a new class of three solid support ships, under the Fleet Solid Support Ship Programme.

== Class details ==
| Name | Pennant | Builder | Ordered | Laid down | Launched | Commissioned | Fate |
|---|---|---|---|---|---|---|---|
| Fort Victoria | A387 | Harland & Wolff, Belfast/Cammell Laird | 23 April 1986 | 4 April 1988 | 12 June 1990 | 24 June 1994, under "assisted maintenance" at Rosyth Dockyard | In refit for reactivation as of September 2026 |
| Fort George | A388 | Swan Hunter, Wallsend-on-Tyne | 18 December 1987 | 9 March 1989 | 1 March 1991 | 16 July 1993 | Decommissioned April 2011; Scrapped 2013 |

== See also ==
- List of replenishment ships of the Royal Fleet Auxiliary
- Fort Rosalie or Fort I class RFA replenishment ships

== Bibliography ==
- Beaver, Paul, Britain's Modern Royal Navy, Patrick Stephens Limited, 1996, ISBN 1-85260-442-5
