= Royal Fleet Auxiliary =

Naval auxiliary fleet which supports the Royal Navy

- Active: 1905–present
- Country: United Kingdom
- Branch: Royal Navy
- Type: Auxiliary force
- Role: Replenishment & Operational Support
- Size: 1,750 personnel (as of late 2022); combined vessel displacement c. 244,000 tonnes
- RFA Headquarters: Leach Building, Whale Island, Portsmouth, England, UK
- Colours: Blue and gold
- Fleet: 9 vessels –; 4 Replenishment oilers; 1 Multi-role replenishment ship; 3 Landing Ship Dock (Auxiliary); 1 Multi-Role Ocean Surveillance Ship
- Decorations: Kings Colour
- Website: http://www.royalnavy.mod.uk/our-organisation/the-fighting-arms/royal-fleet-auxiliary

Commanders
- Commodore in Chief: Prince Edward, Duke of Edinburgh
- Commodore RFA: Commodore Sam Shattock

Insignia
- Royal Fleet Auxiliary Ensign

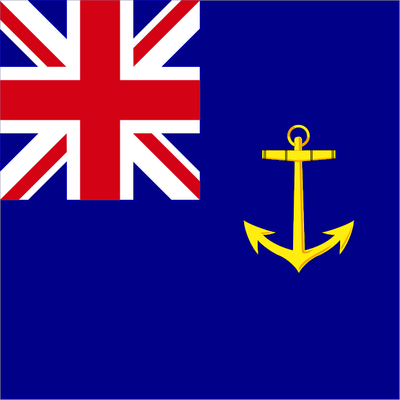
- Royal Fleet Auxiliary Jack
- Abbreviation: RFA

The Royal Fleet Auxiliary (RFA) is a naval auxiliary fleet owned by the UK's Ministry of Defence. It is a component of His Majesty's Naval Service and provides logistical and operational support to the Royal Navy and Royal Marines. It forms one of the five fighting arms of the Royal Navy.

The RFA ensures the Royal Navy is supplied and supported by providing fuel and stores through replenishment at sea, transporting Royal Marines and British Army personnel, providing medical care and transporting equipment and essentials around the world. In addition the RFA acts independently providing humanitarian aid, counter piracy and counter narcotic patrols together with assisting the Royal Navy in preventing conflict and securing international trade. They are a uniformed civilian branch of the Royal Navy staffed by British merchant sailors.

RFA personnel are civilian employees of the Ministry of Defence and members of the Royal Naval Reserve and Sponsored Reserves. Although RFA personnel wear Merchant Navy rank insignia with naval uniforms, RFA vessels are commanded and crewed by these sailors, augmented with regular and reserve Royal Navy personnel who perform specialised functions such as operating and maintaining helicopters or providing hospital facilities. Royal Navy personnel are also needed to operate certain weapons, such as the Phalanx; however, other weapons (such as the DS30B 30 mm cannon) are operated by RFA personnel. The RFA counts three dock landing ships amongst its assets.

As of late 2024, the RFA was suffering from severe manpower shortages resulting in only 6 of (then) 11 vessels being able to be crewed on a regular basis.

== History ==
The RFA was established in 1905 to provide logistical support for the Navy. Since the Royal Navy of that era possessed the largest network of bases around the world of any fleet, the RFA at first took a relatively minor role.

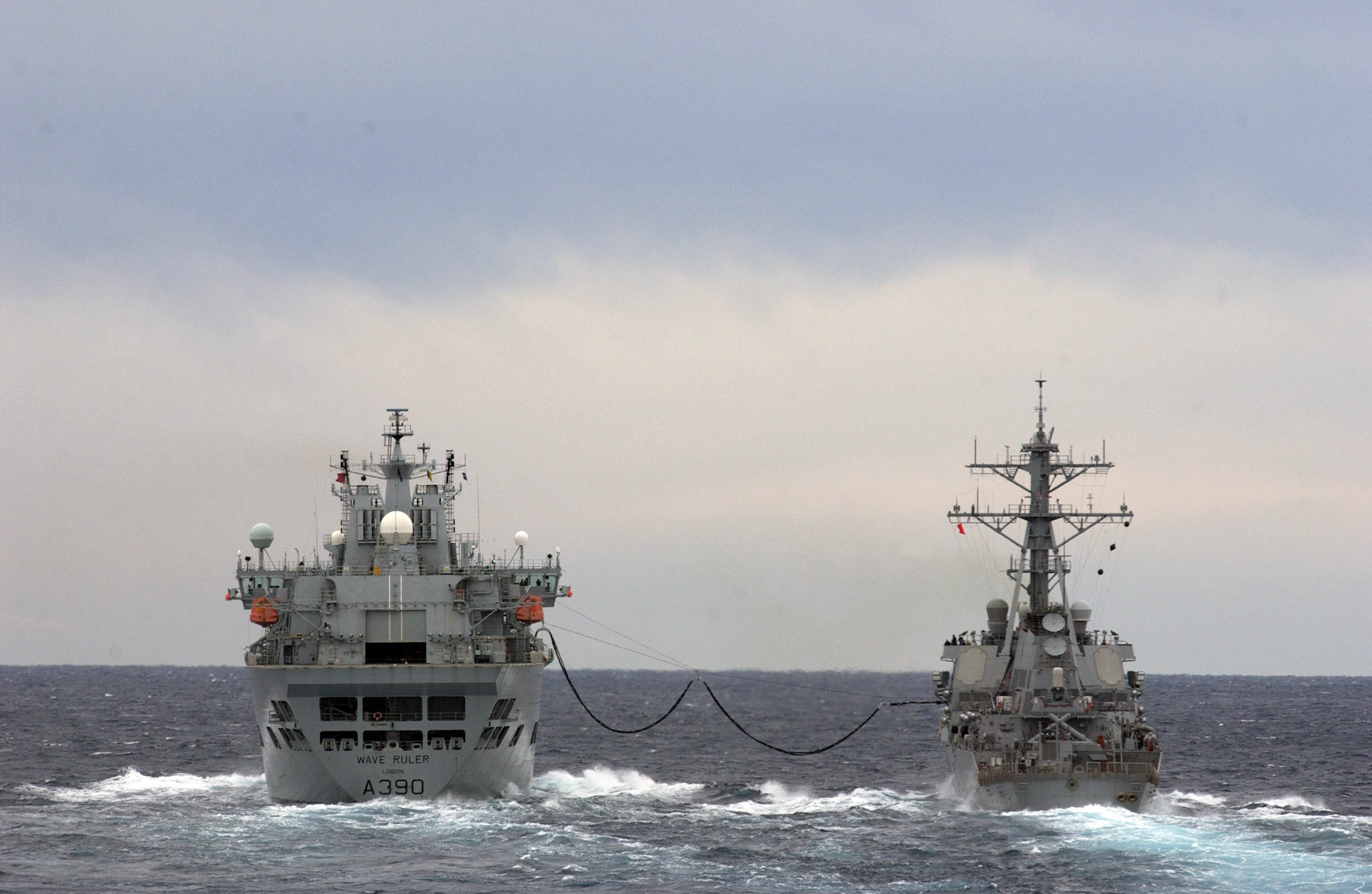
USS Donald Cook receives fuel during a replenishment at sea (RAS) with the former RFA Wave Ruler

The RFA first became heavily relied upon by the Royal Navy during World War II, when the British fleet was often far from available bases, either due to the enemy capturing such bases, or, in the Pacific, because of the sheer distances involved. World War II also saw naval ships staying at sea for much longer periods than had been the case since the days of sail. Techniques of replenishment at sea (RAS) were developed. The auxiliary fleet comprised a diverse collection, with not only RFA ships, but also commissioned warships and merchantmen as well. The need for the fleet to be maintained was unambiguously demonstrated by World War II.

After 1945, the RFA became the Royal Navy's main source of support in the many conflicts that the Navy was involved in. The RFA performed important service to the Far East Fleet off Korea from 1950 until 1953, when sustained carrier operations were again mounted in Pacific waters. During the extended operations of the Konfrontasi in the 1960s, the RFA was also heavily involved. As the network of British bases overseas shrank during the end of the Empire, the Navy increasingly relied on the RFA to supply its ships during routine deployments.

The RFA played an important role in the largest naval war since 1945, the Falklands War in 1982 (where one vessel was lost and another badly damaged), and also the Gulf War, Kosovo War, Afghanistan Campaign and the 2003 invasion of Iraq.

In July 2008, the RFA was presented with a Queen's Colour, an honour unique to a civilian organisation.

== Fleet ==
Ships of the Royal Fleet Auxiliary

Ship names alphabetically
- A; B; C; D; E; F; G; H; I; J; K; L; M; N; O; P; Q; R; S; T; U; V; W; X; Y; Z

Ships by type
- Amphibious warfare ships; Replenishment ships; Miscellaneous ships

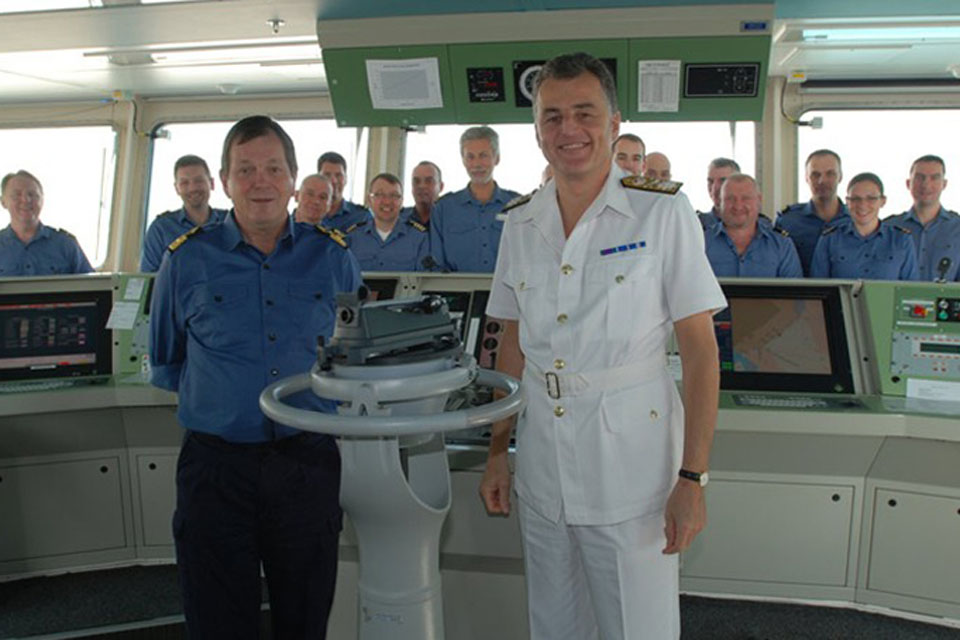
Commodore Bill Walworth and Commodore Tim Fraser RN aboard RFA Lyme Bay

Ships in RFA service carry the ship prefix RFA, standing for Royal Fleet Auxiliary, and fly the Blue Ensign defaced with an upright gold killick anchor. All Royal Fleet Auxiliaries are built and maintained to Lloyd's Register and Department for Transport standards.

As of early-2026, there are 9 ships in service with the Royal Fleet Auxiliary with a total displacement of approximately 244,000 tonnes. These figures exclude the merchant navy vessels under charter to the Ministry of Defence performing sealift and fuel provisioning roles.

=== Underway replenishment ===
The most important role provided by the RFA is replenishment at sea (RAS), therefore the mainstay of the current RFA fleet are the replenishment ships. Two classes of vessel are in service as of 2024: Fort Victoria and the Tide class.

The Tide class are designated 'Fast Fleet Tankers' that were ordered in February 2012. The four tankers were ordered from DSME, South Korea with design support from Britain's BMT Defence Services, the first of which Tidespring entered service in 2017. In terms of Royal Fleet Auxiliary tankers, as of 2022, only the Tide class remain active with both of the former Wave class vessels placed in extended readiness (uncrewed reserve) and then, in 2024/25, retired from service completely. As of April 2024, RFA Tiderace was also reported to be in extended readiness, primarily owing to serious personnel shortages in the RFA. However, as of late 2025 it was reported that she was being reactivated primarily as a result of sailors becoming available due to the retirement of RFA Argus.

RFA Fort Victoria is a 'one-stop' replenishment ship, capable of providing under way refuelling and dry cargo (i.e. rearming, victualling and spares). Until 2011, she had a sister ship in RFA Fort George until she was decommissioned as a result of defence cuts. Two ships of the Fort Rosalie class also provided dry stores replenishment but were placed into extended readiness in 2020. The two ships were later decommissioned, leaving Fort Victoria the only fleet solid support ship in service. In 2024, she was relegated to "extended readiness" (uncrewed reserve) but she entered refit in September 2026 in order to be reactivated and provide a "bridge" capability prior to the delivery of a new class of solid stores support ships. This new class of three fleet solid support ships are expected to arrive starting in 2031 under the Fleet Solid Support Ship Programme. The manufacturing contract for this acquisition, valued at £1.6 billion, was signed in January 2023.

The Tide class and Fort Victoria incorporate aviation facilities, providing aviation support and training facilities as well as vertical replenishment (VERTREP) capabilities. They are capable of operating and supporting AgustaWestland Merlin and AgustaWestland Wildcat helicopters, both of which are significant weapons platforms. The presence of aviation facilities on RFA ships allows for them to be used as 'force multipliers' for the task groups they support in line with Royal Navy doctrine.

==== Replenishment ships ====
Class	Ship	Pennant No.	Entered service	Displacement	Type	Note
Tide class	RFA Tidespring	A136	2017	39,000 tonnes	Replenishment tanker	
Tide class	RFA Tiderace	A137	2018	39,000 tonnes	Replenishment tanker	(Note: As of April 2024, RFA Tiderace was reported to be in extended readiness (uncrewed reserve); being reactivated as of late 2025)
Tide class	RFA Tidesurge	A138	2019	39,000 tonnes	Replenishment tanker	
Tide class	RFA Tideforce	A139	2019	39,000 tonnes	Replenishment tanker	
Fort Victoria class	RFA Fort Victoria	A387	1994	33,675 tonnes	Multi-role replenishment ship	(Note: RFA Fort Victoria placed in extended readiness (uncrewed reserve) as of late 2024; in refit for reactivation as of September 2026)

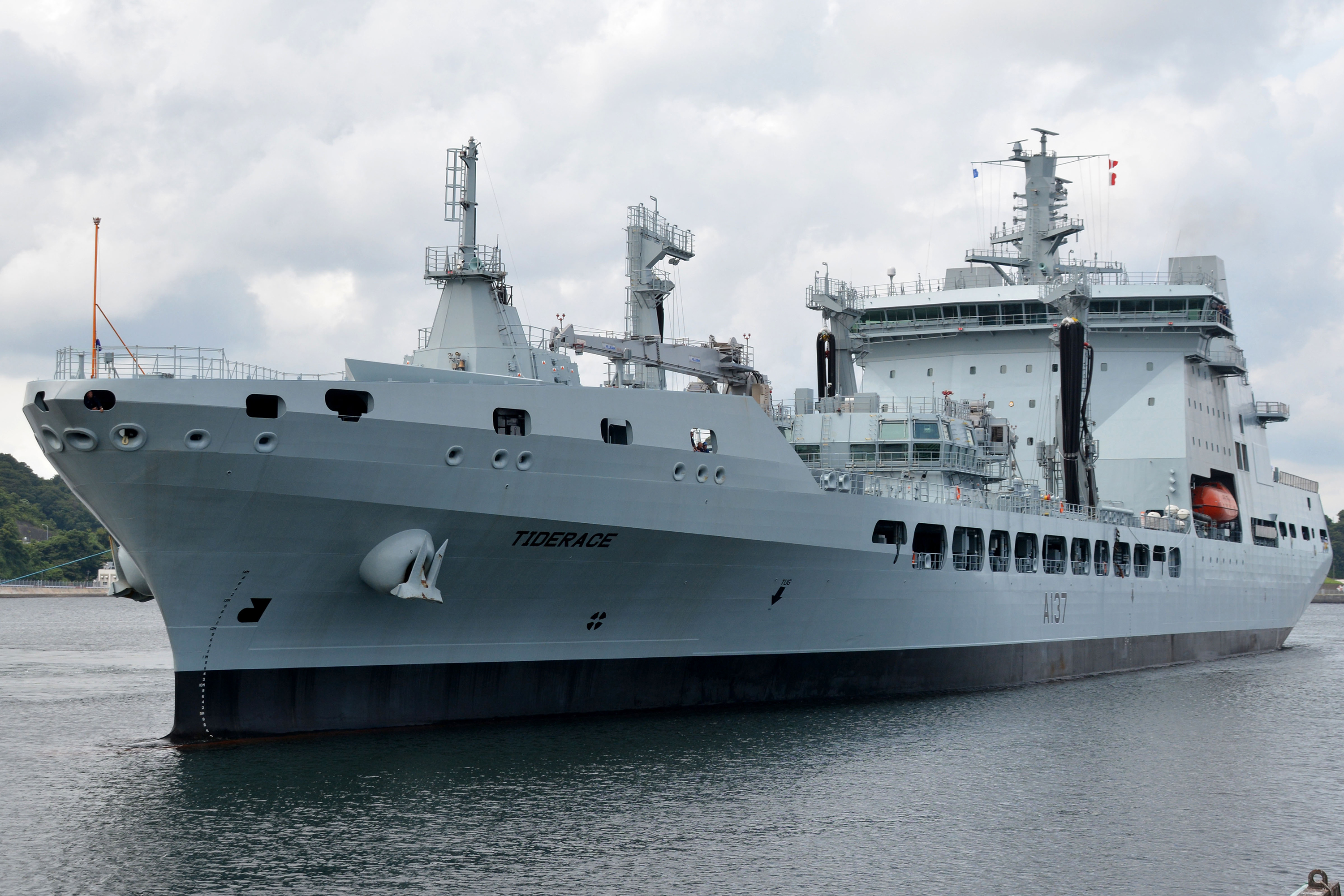
Tiderace (Tide class)

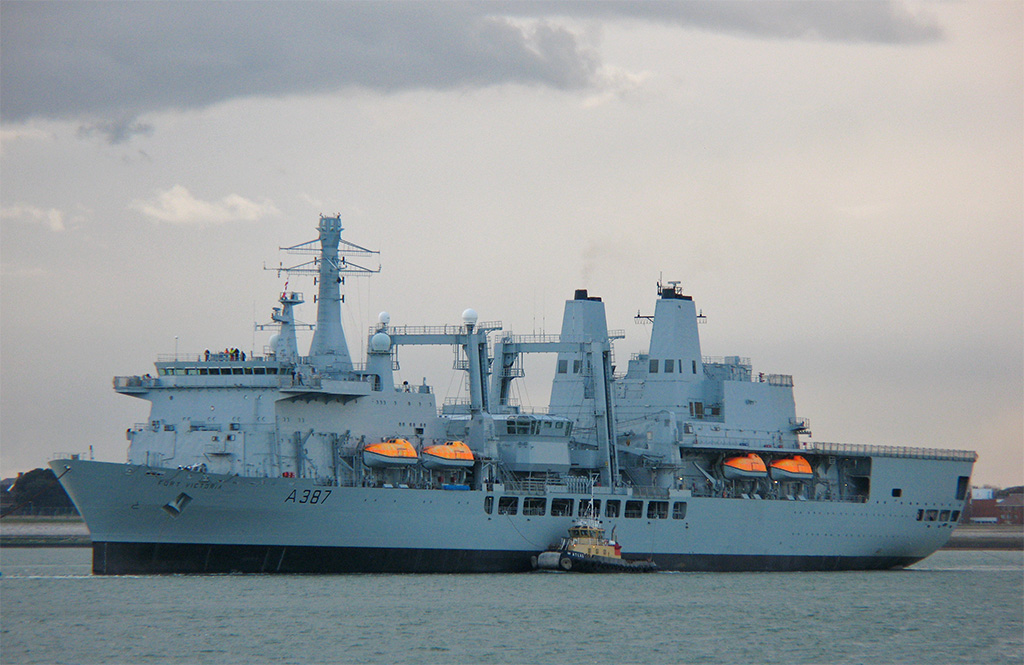
Fort Victoria (Fort Victoria class)

=== Amphibious warfare ===
From 2025 the RFA has been tasked with playing the lead role in providing amphibious shipping within the naval service, through its three Bay-class dock landing ships (LSD). Historically, one Bay-class vessel was assigned as a permanent 'mothership' for Royal Navy mine countermeasures vessels in the Persian Gulf. However, crewing problems in the RFA have meant that the capacity to do this has eroded while the deployment of Royal Navy minehunters in the Gulf itself ended in 2025/26. Nevertheless, in early 2026 it was indicated that RFA Lyme Bay would undertake the role of acting as a 'mothership' for the navy's autonomous minehunting systems.

The 2021 defence white paper proposed the acquisition of a new class of up to six Multi-Role Support Ships (MRSS) to support littoral strike operations. However, these vessels were cancelled as part of the 2026 Defence Investment Plan (DIP). The DIP returned to the idea of U.K. participation in the procurement of a joint-British-Dutch future ATS-class amphibious warfare ship, stating that "The Multi-Role Strike Ship (MRSS) programme was too complex and did not reflect the UK Commando Force we are now pursuing". The timing for any future delivery of a new capability is likely in the 2030s.

==== Dock landing ships ====
Class	Ship	Pennant No.	Entered service	Displacement	Type	Note
Bay class	RFA Lyme Bay	L3007	2007	16,160 tonnes	Dock landing ship auxiliary	(Note: Lyme Bay to assume a mine countermeasures command role for Royal Navy autonomous systems as of early 2026)
Bay class	RFA Mounts Bay	L3008	2006	16,160 tonnes	Dock landing ship auxiliary	
Bay class	RFA Cardigan Bay	L3009	2006	16,160 tonnes	Dock landing ship auxiliary	(Note: Cardigan Bay in refit at Falmouth as of April 2026)

Cardigan Bay (Bay class)

=== Ocean surveillance/survey ===
The RFA has acquired a Multi-Role Ocean Surveillance Ship to protect undersea critical national infrastructure, such as gas pipelines and undersea cables. In February 2023, the vessel identified for this role - MV Topaz Tangaroa - was acquired and in October 2023 entered service as RFA Proteus. She was purchased for some £70 million and was converted to act as a mothership for autonomous systems and have military communications and light defensive armament added.

It had been reported that a second MROS ship would be procured, likely in the early 2030s. However, the 2026 DIP made no mention of such a vessel and instead simply referred to the investment of £330m over four years on "critical underwater infrastructure protection, including through enhanced capabilities for RFA PROTEUS". The DIP also indicated that the Government would "explore where we can partner with industry to bring more funding into underwater cable protection".

==== Multi-Role Ocean Surveillance (MROS) Ship ====
Class	Ship	Pennant No.	Entered service	Displacement	Type	Note
—	RFA Proteus	K60	2023	6,000 tonnes	Critical seabed infrastructure protection/underwater surveillance/seabed warfare	(Note: Former commercial vessel converted to ocean surveillance role with communications and other military systems added)

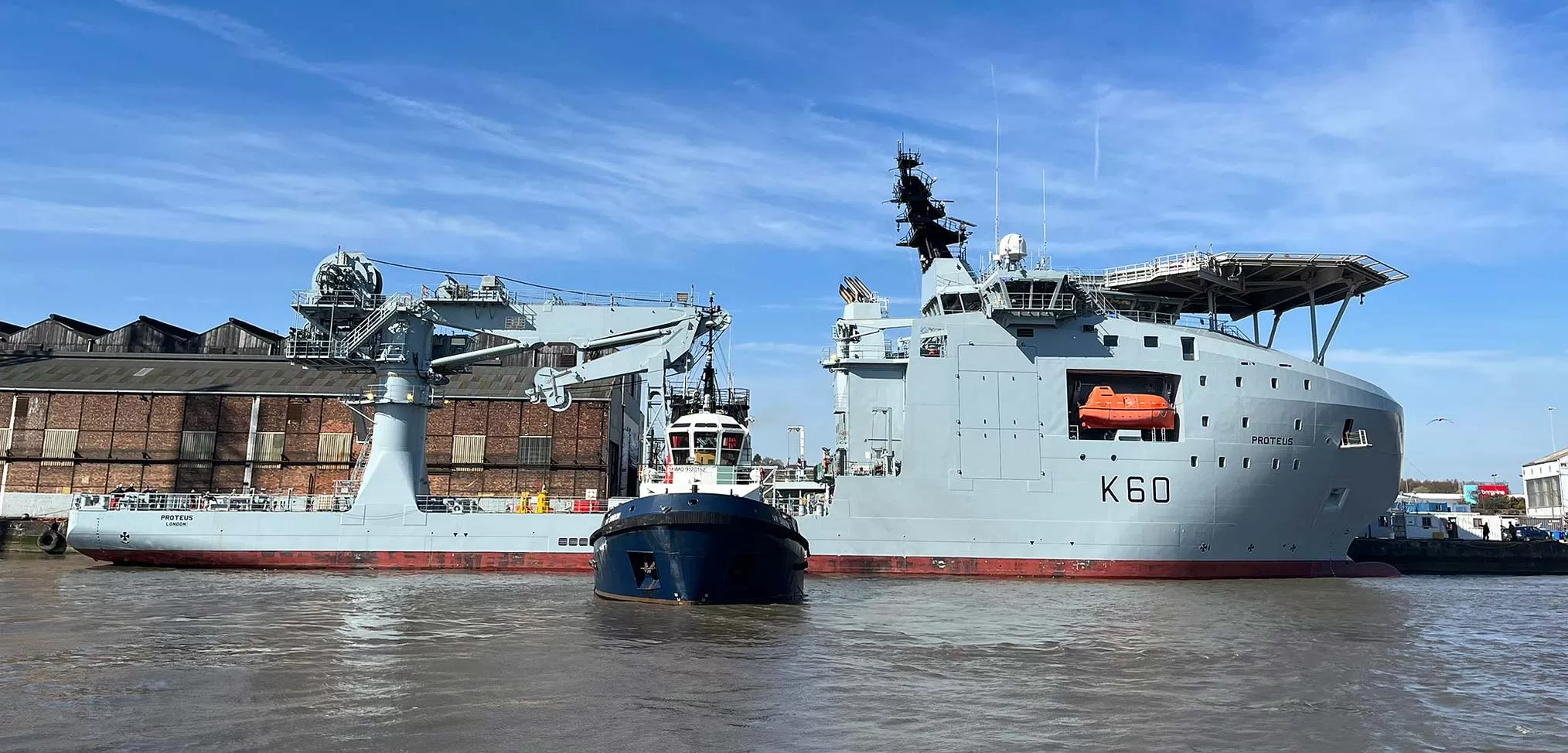
Proteus at Cammell Laird

=== Sealift and fuel provisioning ===
The Point-class sealift ships were acquired in 2002 under a £1.25bn private finance initiative with Foreland Shipping known as the Strategic Sealift Service. These ships are Merchant Navy vessels leased to the Ministry of Defence (MoD) as and when needed and as such are not part of the RFA. However, they are listed here due to their role in expeditionary military operations and in provisioning U.K. military bases and facilities. Originally six ships were part of the deal, allowing the MoD use of four of the ships with two being made available for commercial charter, these latter two were released from the contract in 2012.

The MoD also contracts to secure fuel supplies for facilities overseas. For sometime this requirement was maintained through charter of the vessel Maersk Rapier, then with the vessel Raleigh Fisher and most recently with the ship Leander Fisher. As of 2025, Leander Fisher is tasked with supplying fuel to the United Kingdom's various naval establishments at home and overseas, as well as providing aviation fuel to RAF stations at Cyprus, Ascension Island and the Falkland Islands. A further vessel was chartered from Furetank in 2025 also for the delivery of petroleum products to UK & overseas bases and to assist the Joint Expeditionary Force Maritime. The MoD has chartered vessels to commercial companies during periods when not in use for defence purposes.

==== Ministry of Defence sealift/supply vessels ====
- Not part of the RFA, under charter to the MoD

Class	Ship	Owner	Entered service	Displacement	Type	Note
Point class	MV Hurst Point	Foreland Shipping	2002	23,000 tonnes	Ro-Ro Sealift	
Point class	MV Eddystone	Foreland Shipping	2002	23,000 tonnes	Ro-Ro Sealift	
Point class	MV Hartland Point	Foreland Shipping	2002	23,000 tonnes	Ro-Ro Sealift	
Point class	MV Anvil Point	Foreland Shipping	2003	23,000 tonnes	Ro-Ro Sealift	
—	MV Leander Fisher	James Fisher and Sons	2022	24,500 gross tonnes	Tanker	(Note: Vessel provides fuel provisioning for UK military facilities.)
—	MV Fure Vanguard	Furetank	2024	18,000 DWT	Tanker	(Note: Under charter to the MoD; vessel delivers petroleum products to UK & overseas bases, supports internal transfers, and assists the Joint Expeditionary Force Maritime.)

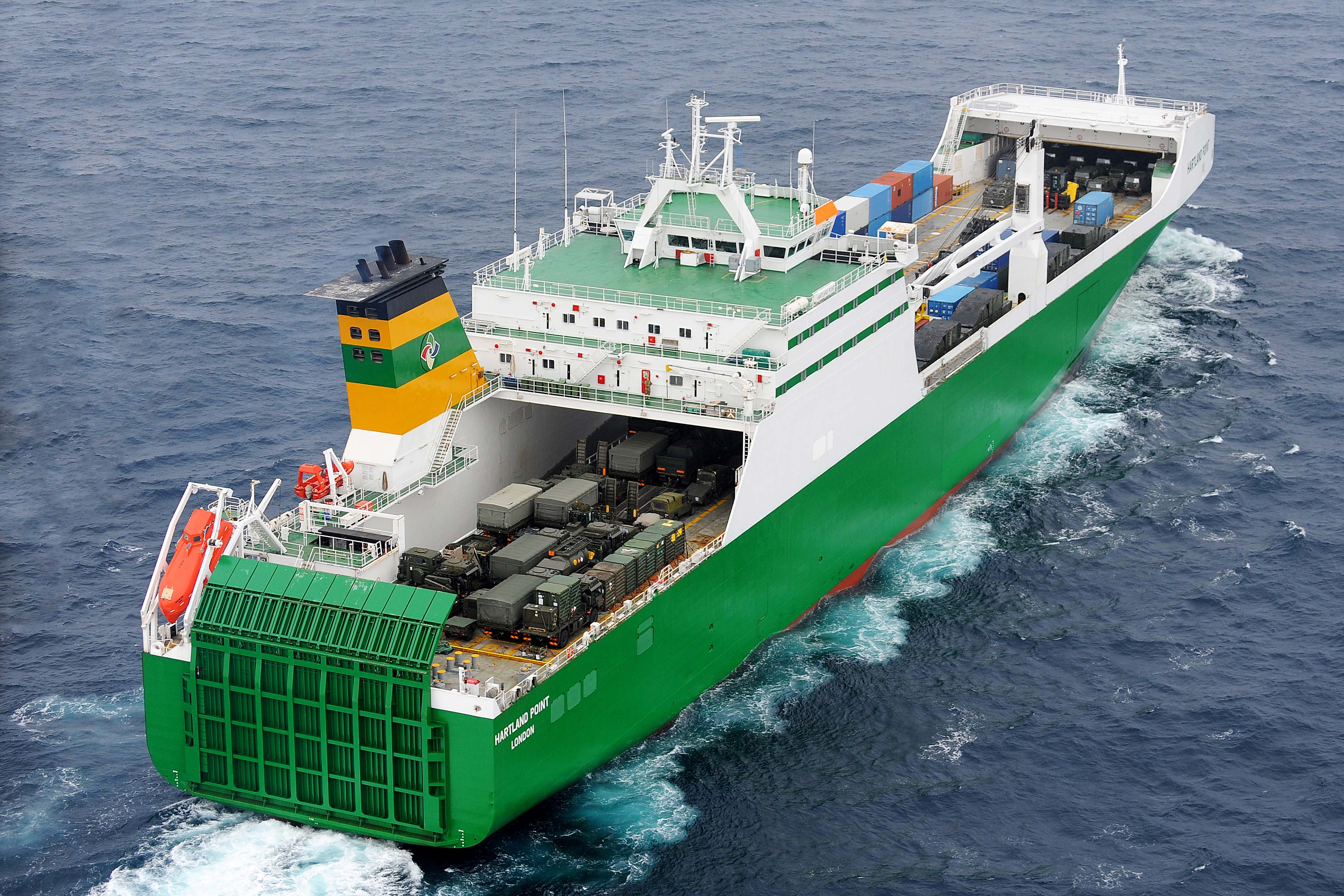
Hartland Point (Point class)

== Rank insignia ==
=== Officers ===
Rank insignia of RFA officers differ from the Royal Navy as the RFA makes use of the diamond used by some British merchant shipping companies, rather than the executive curl used by the RN. The rank of commodore is the most senior rank in the RFA.

RFA Officer Ranks and Insignia
Rank	Commodore	Captain	Chief Officer	First Officer	Second Officer	Third Officer	Officer Cadet
Insignia							
Abbreviation	Cdre	Capt	C/O	1/O	2/O	3/O	CDT
Analogous RN Rank*	Commodore	Captain	Commander	Lieutenant Commander	Lieutenant	Sub Lieutenant	Midshipman/Officer Cadet

Department Colours

The RFA uses distinction cloth to distinguish the branch of its officers. The Royal Navy ceased this practice for most officers in 1955, with the exception of medical and dental officers who are denoted by red and orange cloth respectively.

Deck (X)	Logistics and Supply (LS)	Marine Engineering (ME)	Systems Engineering (SE)	Communications
unadorned				

Although the Marine Engineering distinction cloth is generally described as being purple, it is in practice closer to maroon.

=== Crew ===
RFA Crew Ranks and Insignia
Rank	Chief Petty Officer	Petty Officer	Petty Officer	Leading Hand	Seaman Grade 1	Seaman Grade 2	Apprentice
Insignia							
Branch shown	Comms	Comms	Deck	Comms	Deck	Deck	

== Uniforms ==
Officers and Ratings of the RFA wear similar uniforms to the regular navy with RFA distinguishing marks.

=== No. 1 Dress ===
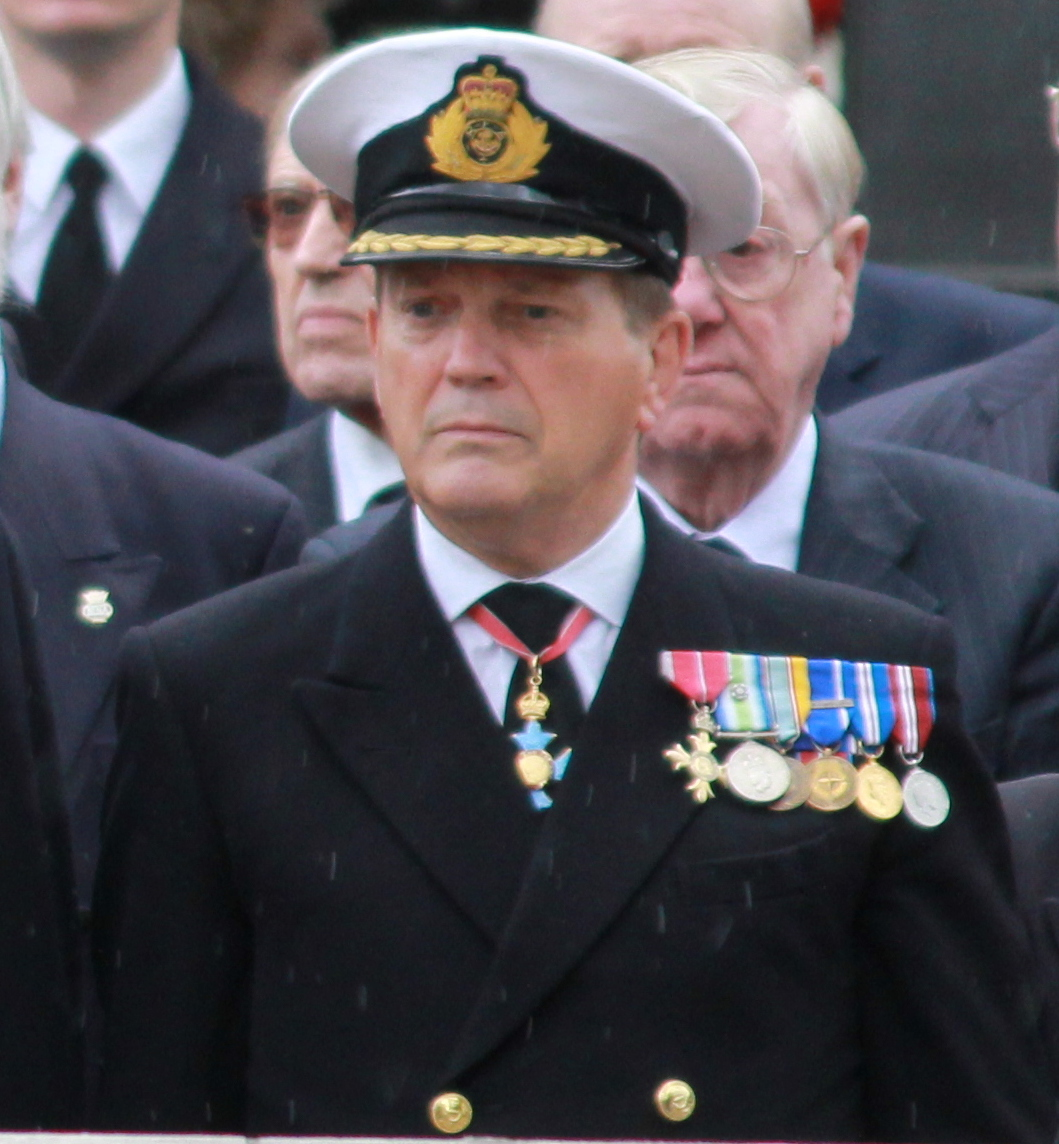
No. 1 dress

This is the formal uniform worn on ceremonial occasions. For all officers it consists of a double-breasted, navy blue reefer jacket with four rows of two RFA buttons; matching trousers; white shirt and black tie; peaked cap; and black leather shoes. Rank insignia is denoted on the lower sleeve. RFA officer cap badges, although similar in style to those used by RN officers, feature a ring with letters 'RFA' surrounding the fouled anchor at the centre.

For ratings below the rank of Petty Officer, this uniform is a single breasted tunic fastened with four RFA buttons, with flapped chest pockets and hip pockets; white shirt and black tie, and a dark blue beret and black leather shoes. Petty Officers and Chief Petty Officers wear a double breasted navy blue reefer jacket similar to the Officers version but with three rows of two RFA buttons. They wear a beret with an RFA badge, formerly a pantone blue, now the same colour as the RN Navy Blue. Rank insignia is denoted on the lower sleeve.

=== No. 2 Dress ===
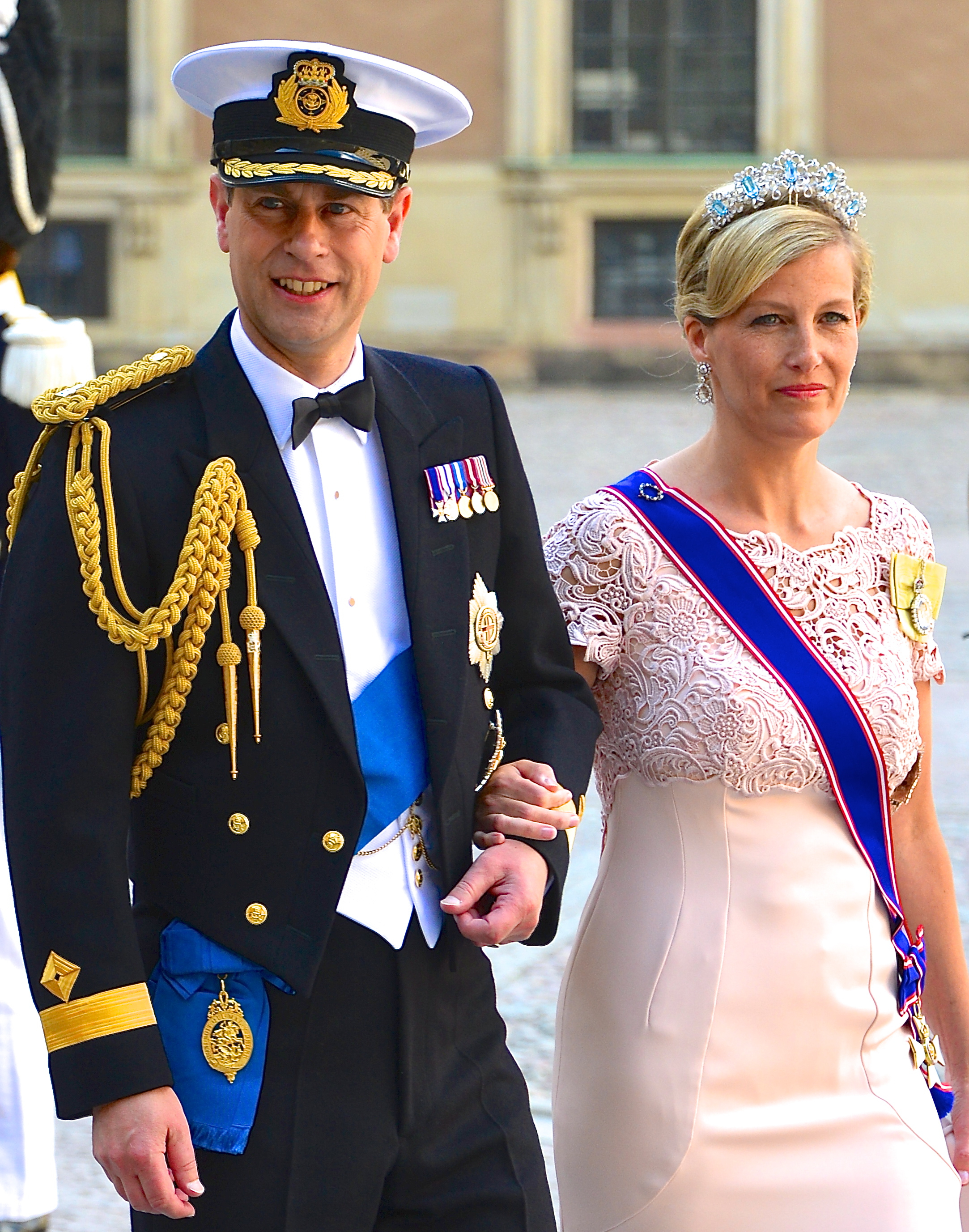
No. 2A dress, as worn by the Duke of Edinburgh

Number 2A dress is the formal evening dress for ceremonial dinners; it consists of a navy blue mess jacket with a white waistcoat (black cummerbund for female officers) with miniature medals. 2B is "mess undress" for other mess functions, and is worn with either a black cummerbund or navy blue waistcoat and miniature medals. 2C, "red sea rig", is worn for informal evening wear on board ship; it consists of a white short sleeved shirt, worn with shoulderboards, without medals and with black trousers, black shoes and a black cummerbund. It is unusual to see a black cummerbund worn with red sea rig as it is traditional to have personalised cummerbunds. These are usually in the branch colours of the wearer and commonly have either a branch insignia or a ship's badge embroidered in the centre. This tradition is also prevalent in the RN.

=== No. 3 Dress ===
This is worn all year round for general duties. It consists of a white shirt with rank insignia on the shoulders, and appropriate headgear. For officers 3A dress includes a long-sleeved shirt and tie, while 3B includes a short-sleeved shirt worn with hard shoulder boards. 3C is the same in all respects as 3A but with the addition of a navy blue woollen jersey. This is the same as for Officer's No. 3 dress but with the relevant rate insignia and beret. Junior rates are only issued with short-sleeve shirts and are not issued with ties. Thus No.3 dress is divided into 3B (without jersey) and 3C dress (navy-blue jersey worn over the shirt with the shirt collar out). There is no equivalent of 3A dress for junior ratings.

=== No. 4 Dress ===
Number 4 dress is the working uniform of the RFA. It is referred to as Royal Fleet Auxiliary Personal Clothing System (RFAPCS); it consists of a navy blue fire-retardant jacket, navy blue baseball cap and beret, navy blue stable belt, navy-blue fire-retardant trousers, dms boots, black T-shirt and an optional navy-blue microfleece. Number 4R dress is the same only without the jacket and with an optional baseball cap. RFAPCS is distinguished from its RNPCS counterpart by the RFA blue ensign and 'ROYAL FLEET AUXILIARY' tape replacing the white ensign and 'ROYAL NAVY' tape worn on the left arm and left chest pocket respectively. Junior ratings may also wear an RFA badged baseball cap in this order of dress, whilst undertaking courses at Royal Navy establishments.

=== No. 5 Dress ===
Number 5 dress is the collective category for all specialist working uniforms. They are worn as required for duties.

== Recruitment and training ==
As of 2022–23, the RFA was reported to be facing considerable recruiting challenges. Manpower was said to have dropped by 5 per cent from 2021 to 2022, contributing to the reduced availability, and even potential redundancy, of some vessels. In September 2024 RFA sailors began strike action over low pay. Due to compounding personnel shortages, even routine ship movements were curtailed. As of May 2026, it was reported that crewing problems had improved modestly (partly because fewer ships were now in RFA service), and although only six of nine ships were active and crewed it was anticipated that this might improve to eight active ships by 2027.

The RFA recruits ratings either directly from industry (or where they are suitably trained to allow direct entry), or as apprentices whilst undertaking training.

The RFA offers Apprenticeships in Seamanship, Communications and Marine Engineering. Steward and Catering Specialist apprenticeships were previously available but are currently on hold. All Apprenticeships last roughly 18 months. Seamanship: 10 Weeks training at HMS Raleigh followed by 6 months’ sea time, concluding with the Apprentices returning to HMS Raleigh for 4 weeks to gain their ‘Efficient Deck Hand’ certificate Communications: 16 weeks training at HMS Collingwood, followed by a first sea phase of around 3 months, a further 20 (approximate) weeks at HMS Collingwood followed by another 4 month sea phase Marine Engineering: 7 months training at HMS Sultan followed by 6 months’ sea time.

All Apprentices complete STCW and Royal Navy additional qualifications (i.e firefighting and CBRN)

Officers are recruited in one of three ways:

- direct from industry (or where they are suitably trained to allow direct entry)
- via the RTO (rating-to-officer) programme
- as cadets

All new officers take part in a 3-week Initial Naval Training Officers (INT-O) course at BRNC Dartmouth that is designed to familiarise new officers to the RFA and develop leadership skills.

== List of Commodores Royal Fleet Auxiliary ==
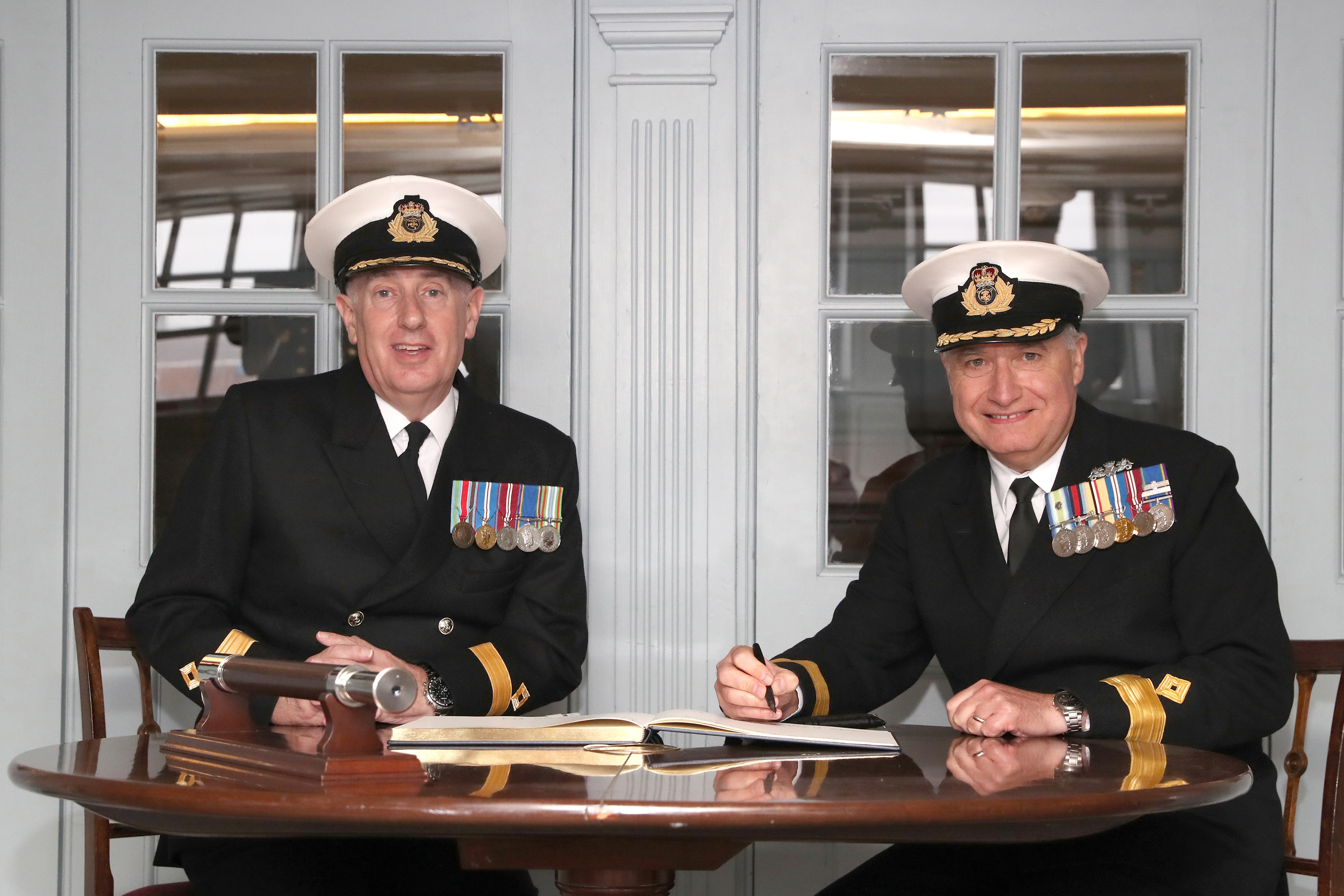
Commodores David Eagles and Duncan Lamb at the transfer of command of the RFA in 2020

The post of Commodore of the Royal Fleet Auxiliary (COMRFA) was created in 1951, known as Commodore RFA and Deputy Director Royal Navy Afloat Support since 2020, is the senior officer of the RFA. The following people have served as COMRFA:

- 1951–1954: Stanley Kent
- 1954–1955: William Browne
- 1955–1957: Thomas Card
- 1957–1962: Thomas Elder
- 1962–1964: Albert Curtain
- 1964–1966: Eric Payne
- 1966–1968: Griffith Evans
- 1968–1971: Joe Dines
- 1971–1972: Henry L'Estrange
- 1972–1977: George Robson
- 1977–1983: Samuel Dunlop
- 1983–1985: James Coull
- 1986–1989: Barry Rutterford
- 1989–1994: Richard Thorn
- 1994–1999: Norman Squire
- 1999–2003: Peter Lannin
- 2003–2008: Robert Thornton
- 2008–2013: Bill Walworth
- 2013–2015: Rob Dorey
- 2015–2020: Duncan Lamb
- 2020–2024: David Eagles
- 2024–present: Sam Shattock

== See also ==
=== Lists of Royal Fleet Auxiliary ships by role ===
- List of amphibious warfare ships of the Royal Fleet Auxiliary
- List of replenishment ships of the Royal Fleet Auxiliary
- List of miscellaneous ships of the Royal Fleet Auxiliary

=== Lists of ships operated by or in support of His Majesty's Naval Service ===
- List of active Royal Navy ships
- List of active Royal Marines military watercraft
- List of ships of Serco Marine Services

=== Related articles ===
- His Majesty's Naval Service
- List of Royal Fleet Auxiliary ship names
- Merchant Navy (United Kingdom)
- Royal Research Ship
- Military Sealift Command – the United States Navy's analogue to the Royal Fleet Auxiliary
- Solid Support Ship

== Bibliography ==
The Royal Fleet Auxiliary – A Century of Service. Adams/Smith. London 2005. Chatham Publishing. ISBN 1-86176-259-3.

Dictionary of Royal Fleet Auxiliary Ships from 1905, Adams T A, Dunbeath/St Albans 2025. Whittles (Porto Publishing. [ISBN 978 184995 575 1]
