= RFA Fort Victoria =

1994 Fort Victoria-class replenishment oiler of the Royal Fleet Auxiliary

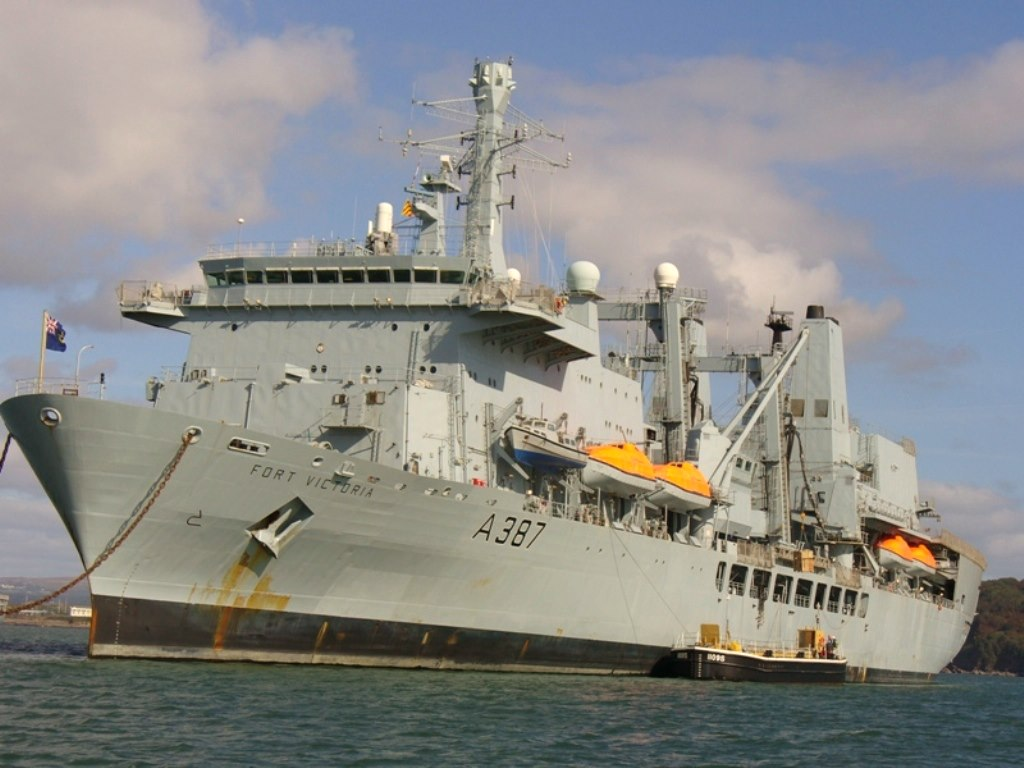
- RFA Fort Victoria

History

United Kingdom
- Name: Fort Victoria
- Namesake: Fort Victoria (Isle of Wight)
- Ordered: 23 April 1986
- Builder: Harland & Wolff, Belfast, United Kingdom
- Laid down: 15 September 1988
- Launched: 4 May 1990
- Commissioned: 24 June 1994
- Home port: Marchwood Military Port, Southampton
- Identification: Pennant number: A387; IMO number: 8606032; MMSI number: 233135000; International call sign: GACE; Deck code: FV
- Status: Ship in extended readiness (uncrewed reserve) as of late 2024; in refit for reactivation as of September 2026

General characteristics
- Class & type: Fort Victoria-class replenishment oiler
- Displacement: 31,565 t (31,066 long tons) full load
- Length: 203.5 m (667 ft 8 in)
- Beam: 30.4 m (99 ft 9 in)
- Draught: 9.7 m (31 ft 10 in)
- Propulsion: 2 × Crossley-Pielstick V16 medium speed diesels, 2 shafts, 25,083 bhp (18,704 kW)
- Speed: 20 knots (37 km/h; 23 mph)
- Capacity: 12,500 m^{3} (441,433 cu ft) liquids; 3,377 m^{3} (119,258 cu ft) ammunition; 2,941 m^{3} (103,860 cu ft) dry stores
- Complement: 95 RFA; 15 RN; 24 RNSTS; 154 RN Air Squadron personnel
- Electronic warfare & decoys: Sea Gnat decoy launcher system
- Armament: 2 × Phalanx CIWS (fitted for, depending on deployment); 2 × GAM-BO1 20 mm guns (fitted for, depending on deployment); 3 × Minigun (replaced by Browning .50 caliber heavy machine guns as of 2023); 7 × General Purpose Machine Guns; (Sea Wolf SAM VLS; originally envisaged but never fit)
- Aviation facilities: Hangar for 3 × Merlin helicopters; 2 spot flight deck

RFA Fort Victoria is a Fort-class combined fleet stores ship and tanker of the Royal Fleet Auxiliary of the United Kingdom tasked with providing ammunition, fuel, food and other supplies to Royal Navy vessels around the world. She is now the only member of her class.

== Construction ==
Fort Victoria was ordered from Harland and Wolff in 1986, and was launched in 1990. She is named after Fort Victoria on the Isle of Wight.

On 6 September 1990, while Fort Victoria was at dock and less than three months after being christened, a Provisional IRA (IRA) unit planted two explosive devices on board. After a telephone warning from the IRA, one of the bombs exploded, causing extensive damage inside the engine room, which was holed and subsequently flooded. The ship listed 45 degrees, and the chances of sinking were high. The ship was saved after hours of work by emergency teams, who pumped the water out of the engine room. Sir John Parker, chairman and CEO of Harland & Wolff, praised the courage of the engineers for saving the ship. It was not learned that a second device had failed to explode until a second IRA phone call 24 hours later. It took two weeks to find and disable the second bomb, which stalled the works further.

This incident and other problems with the construction of the vessel meant it was not delivered until 1993, two years after originally planned.

She was accepted into service on 24 June 1994. In 1998, the ship was fitted with the Phalanx close-in weapon system.

== Operational history ==
The vessel took part in Operation Telic during early 2003.

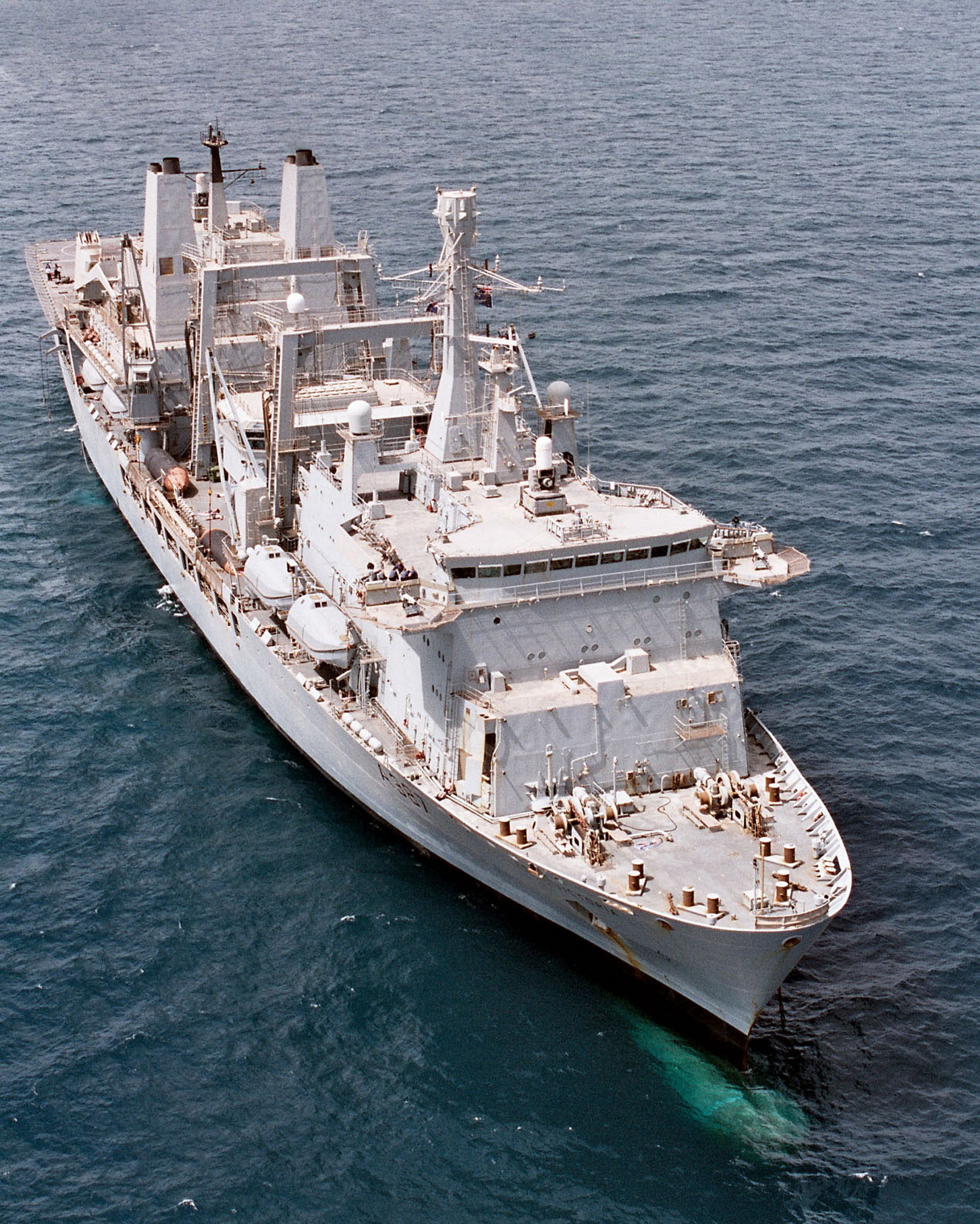
Fort Victoria in 2003 (Note: lifeboats painted grey for Operation Telic)

Fort Victoria was adopted by the Metropolitan Borough of Barnsley and has been affiliated with the borough for over ten years. A battle ensign was presented to the borough in 2003 following the vessel's participation in military operations in the Persian Gulf. The ensign can be seen in the foyer of Barnsley Town Hall.

With her ability to supply anything from humanitarian supplies to fuel and ammunition, Fort Victoria has uses in peacetime and war. An example of this was the Operation Highbrow in Lebanon, where she played a key role in supplying the Royal Navy and giving air support with a flight of Merlin MK1 helicopters from 814 squadron.

From November 2008 until May 2009 she underwent a refit on the Mersey by Cammell Laird Shiprepairers & Shipbuilders, being towed up from the Solent by tugs Red Dolphin and Englishman. She returned to operational status in November 2009, and was set to rejoin the RFA fleet by the early months of 2010. The ship has undergone another refit from March 2014 to December 2014. The refit included the main engines receiving an overhaul, other machinery, pumps and pipework, new fire-detecting and fire-fighting systems, six new main generators, living quarters refurbished, and weapons and sensors also completely overhauled. This £50 million refit will allow the ship to serve for at least another 15 years.

=== Indian Ocean deployments ===
In September 2010, Fort Victoria was posted to the Indian Ocean as part of Operation Ocean Shield, the NATO mission to combat piracy. She has subsequently been involved in several operations against pirates off the coast of Somalia. In June 2011 Fort Victoria was deployed off the coast of Yemen with an embarked force of 80 Royal Marines to assist with the possible evacuation of British nationals from that country due to the recent political unrest there. Britain's foreign secretary, William Hague, had advised British nationals to leave the country immediately saying that it was "extremely unlikely" that the UK government would be able to stage an evacuation operation.

On 11 October 2011 Fort Victoria, along with USS De Wert, was involved in the release of the Italian ship Montecristo after it was hijacked by Somali pirates. The pirates surrendered without resistance. Fort Victoria continued her deployment in the western Indian Ocean into early 2012. On 12 January she foiled an attempt by pirates to attack cargo ships in the Indian Ocean by forcing a previously hijacked tanker, Liquid Velvet, now being used as a pirate mothership, to return to Somalia. On 13 January 2012, Royal Marines operating from Fort Victoria captured 13 Somali pirates in the Western Indian Ocean after they refused to stop despite warning shots fired from a Royal Navy helicopter. The commanding officer of Fort Victoria, Captain Shaun Jones RFA, said:

To manoeuvre such a large ship at speed in close vicinity of a nimble dhow takes extreme concentration and skill; my team were never found wanting. The 13 Somalis certainly found Friday 13th unlucky for them.

— Captain Jones, BBC interview

On 14 May 2012, during its 2012 deployment, U.S. helicopter squadron HSM-77 Detachment Five completed its temporary operational rotation on board Fort Victoria which was serving as the flagship for Combined Task Force 151. This was the first time that a MH-60R helicopter had ever operated from a Royal Navy ship. The detachment's helicopters primarily concentrated on anti-piracy surveillance missions during this two-week period.

For her four-month-long 2013 deployment, Fort Victoria relieved Wave Ruler and operated with Task Force 53 in the Indian Ocean and Persian Gulf. In September 2013 she took over as flagship of Combined Task Force 151 tackling piracy off Somalia. In mid-2013, she sailed with the COUGAR 13 task group.

=== Refit and carrier support ===
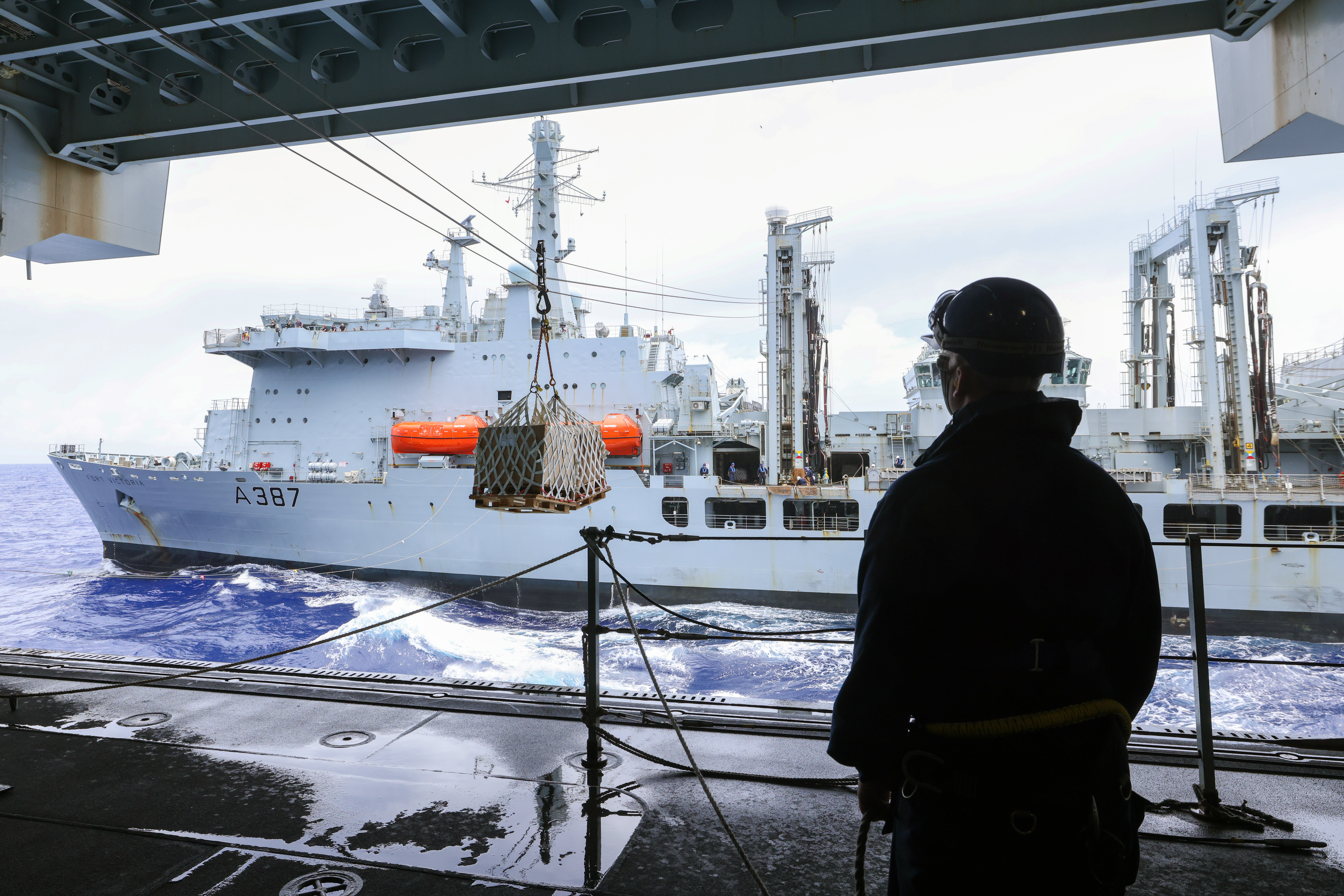
RFA Fort Victoria transferring live ammunition to aircraft carrier HMS Queen Elizabeth.

In July 2017, Fort Victoria returned to the UK following an extended 26-month deployment, much of which was spent East of Suez in support of anti-piracy operations. This included three months in the Aegean Sea in April 2016 on operation Bucktail monitoring activities of people traffickers in the Lesbos region, taking over from RFA Mounts Bay. Following her return, during 2017–2018, the ship underwent an extensive refit intended to allow her to support the Queen Elizabeth-class aircraft carriers and meet current tanker anti-pollution hull requirements upon her re-entry into service. Fort Victoria returned to service in November 2018. In October 2020, she joined a nine-ship UK Carrier Strike Group and performed her first manoeuvres with HMS Queen Elizabeth.

On 11 May 2021 Fort Victoria suffered a small fire whilst alongside in Portland preparing for the Carrier Strike Group 2021 deployment, carrying munitions, fuel and other stores. Emergency services were called to the scene. However, the crew were able to successfully extinguish the small fire before their arrival. Four personnel were treated for smoke inhalation by ambulance crews and were taken to hospital but were not seriously injured.

The ship was in refit in 2022 for an upgrade to her engines as well as other repairs. She was initially reported to have returned to active operations in December 2022. However, in May 2023 it was reported that the ship continued to suffer from significant problems that required rectification, and would likely maintain only a skeleton crew through 2023. Subsequently it was reported that the ship was "mechanically sound" and in an emergency could support an unplanned carrier group deployment, though this would then require taking sailors from other ships due to RFA personnel shortages. In early 2024, the ship was reported to be "in the care of the Cammell Laird shipyard" and in "poor condition". She was expected to remain in refit through 2024. In late 2024, it was reported that she would be placed in "extended readiness" (uncrewed reserve) for at least a year. In May 2026, it was reported that the ship was to commence refit in September 2026 and, assuming that a crew could be found for her, reactivated in 2027. She began her refit for reactivation in September 2026.

=== Replacement ===
The replacement of Fort Victoria with the first of a new class of Fleet Solid Support Ship had been envisaged in around 2028. In July 2022, Rear-Admiral Paul Marshall, the Senior Responsible Officer for the Fleet Solid Support ship project, told the House of Commons Select Defence Committee that the lead ship of this class was envisaged for service entry in 2028. However, subsequently the Ministry of Defence indicated that the first ship of the new class would in fact not be operational until 2031. The MoD also indicated that it was therefore planned to maintain Fort Victoria in service for the required additional transitional period.

== See also ==
- List of replenishment ships of the Royal Fleet Auxiliary
