= RFA Fort George =

1993 Fort Victoria-class replenishment oiler of the Royal Fleet Auxiliary

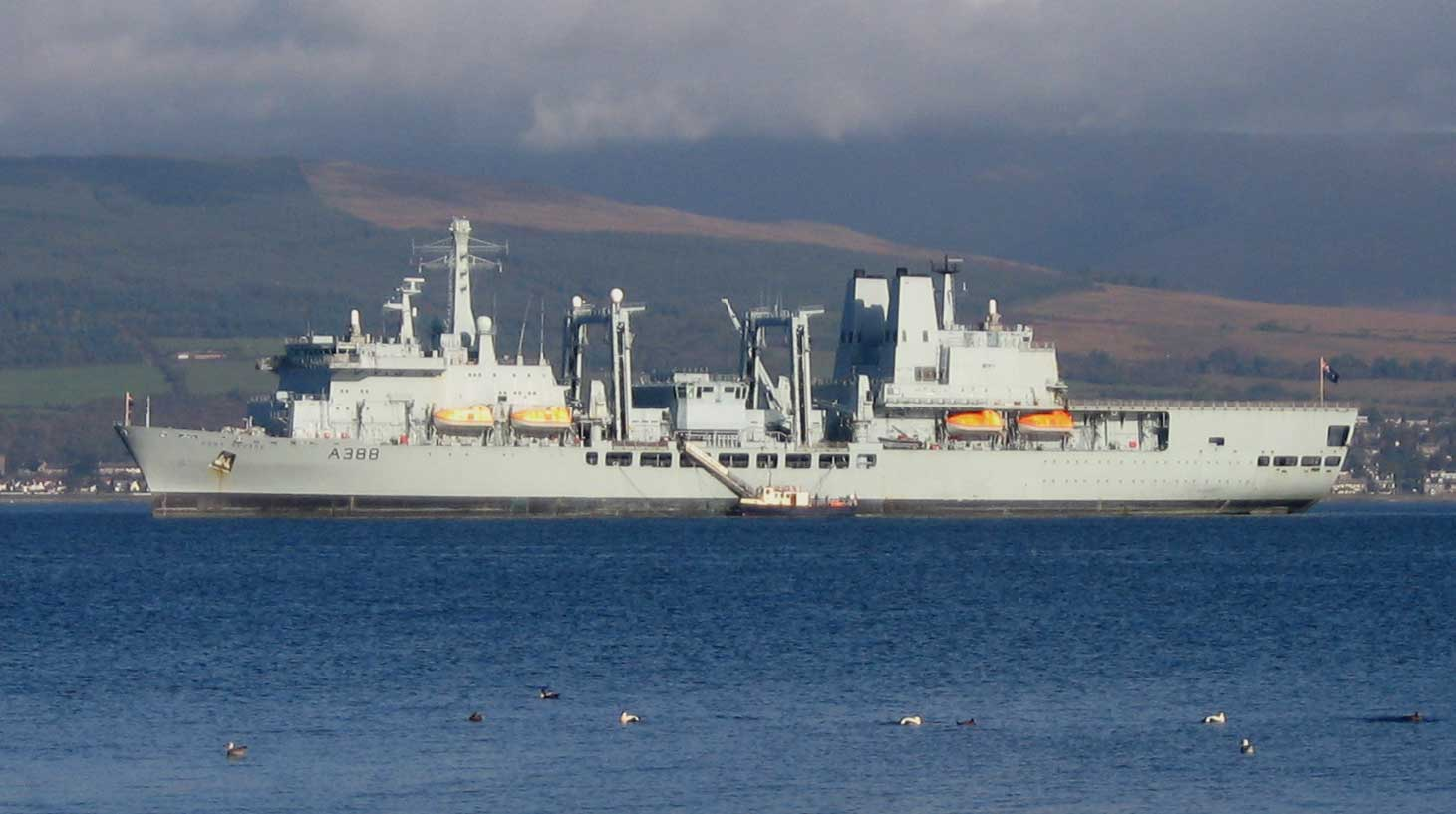
- RFA Fort George (A388)

History

United Kingdom
- Name: RFA Fort George
- Namesake: Fort George
- Ordered: 18 Dec 1987
- Builder: Swan Hunter, Tyne and Wear, United Kingdom
- Yard number: 129
- Laid down: 9 March 1989
- Launched: 1 March 1991
- Completed: 16 July 1993
- Commissioned: 16 July 1993
- Decommissioned: June 2011
- Identification: IMO number: 8800690; Callsign: GCOG; Pennant number: A388
- Fate: Scrapped January 2013

General characteristics
- Class & type: Fort Victoria-class replenishment oiler
- Displacement: 32,300 long tons (32,818 t) full load
- Length: 203.9 m (669 ft 0 in)
- Beam: 30.3 m (99 ft 5 in)
- Draught: 9.7 m (31 ft 10 in)
- Installed power: 47,360 hp (35,320 kW)
- Propulsion: 2 × Oil engines, PC2 type
- Speed: 22 knots (41 km/h)
- Complement: 95 RFA; 15 RN; 24 RNSTS- Lately known as AFSUP (Afloat Support) Ratings / STO(N) (Supply Transport Ordnance (Navy) Officers; 154 RN Air Squadron personnel
- Armament: 2 × Phalanx CIWS; 2 × GAM-BO1 20 mm guns

RFA Fort George was a combined fleet stores ship and tanker of the Royal Fleet Auxiliary, and one of two Fort Victoria-class replenishment oilers.

Fort George was ordered from Swan Hunter in late 1987. The ship was laid down in 1989, launched by the wife of the Commander-in-Chief Fleet Admiral Sir Jock Slater in 1991 and commissioned in 1993. Along with RFA Fort Victoria, the ship was equipped with two Phalanx CIWS point defence guns during a refit at Tyne in 1999.

== Operational history ==
In March 2000, the ship was equipped with five Westland Sea King helicopters and sent to Mozambique to help with disaster relief work following devastating floods. In May she accompanied the aircraft carrier HMS Illustrious to Sierra Leone to support British operations to restore stability to that country. Late in the year, during a deployment in the Mediterranean, the ship helped passengers of the Greek ferry Express Samina which had run aground and sunk during a storm on 26 September.

In September 2009, Fort George, whilst working with the Type 23 frigate HMS Iron Duke, was involved in the largest ever drugs seizure to date by the Royal Navy, when 5.5 tonnes of cocaine were seized from a converted fishing vessel MV Cristal in the Atlantic Ocean off South America.

== Disposal ==
Under the Strategic Defence and Security Review of 2010, the ship was identified for withdrawal. From March 2011 she was being stripped of stores and fittings in Liverpool, where she remained for two years. She left Liverpool on 16 January 2013 under tow destined for a Turkish ship breakers. Her sister ship, RFA Fort Victoria, remains in service as of 2023.

== See also ==
- List of replenishment ships of the Royal Fleet Auxiliary
