= United Kingdom Carrier Strike Group 21 =

British-led naval force

- Part of Operation Fortis
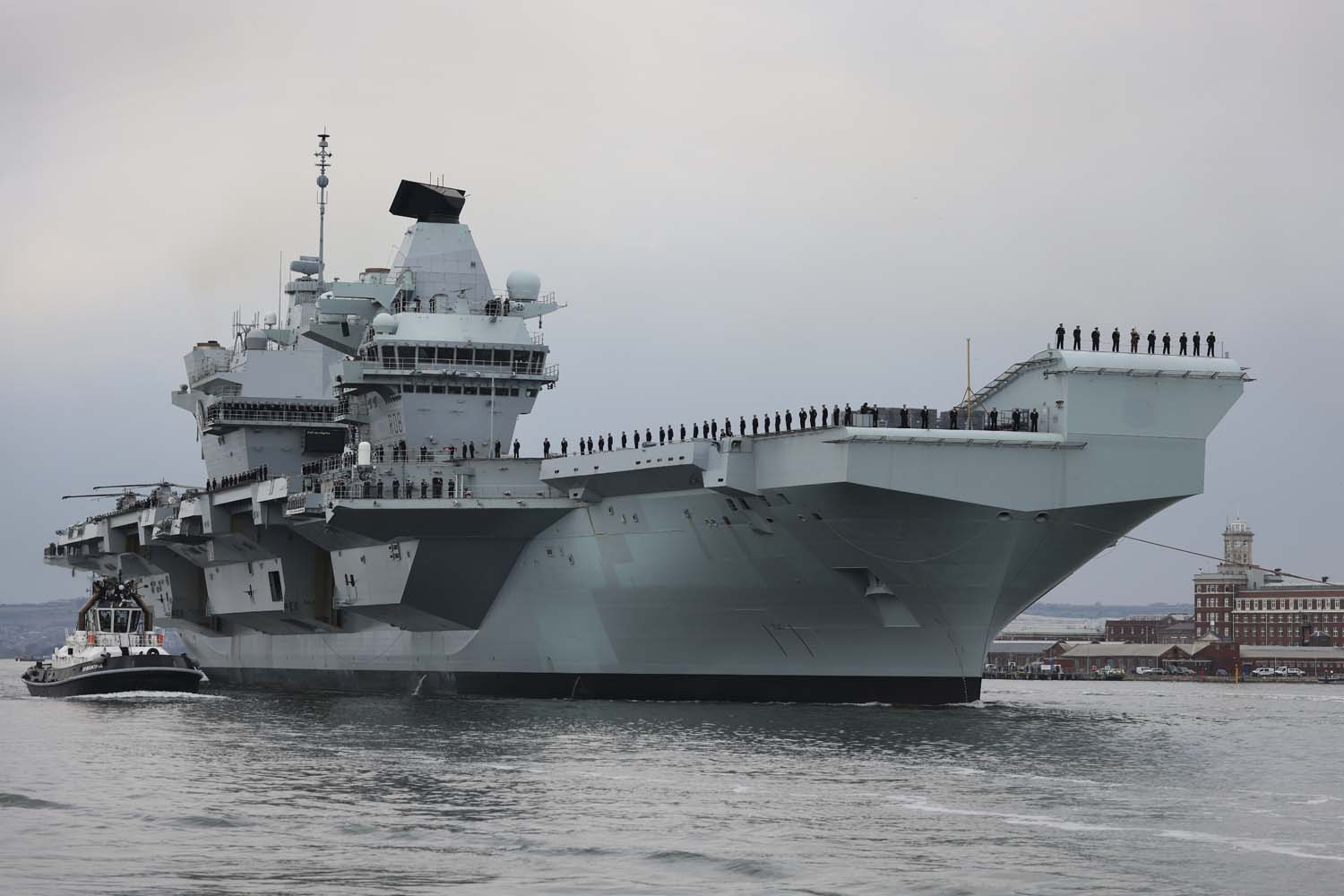
- HMS Queen Elizabeth, lead ship of the carrier strike group, departing Portsmouth for Exercise Strike Warrior
- Type: Carrier strike group
- Commanded by: Commodore Stephen Moorhouse
- Date: May 2021 – December 2021

The United Kingdom Carrier Strike Group 21 (CSG21) was a British-led naval force that was deployed on Operation Fortis from May to December 2021. The Carrier Strike Group is seen as the beginning of the British Government's tilt towards the Indo-Pacific region in terms of defence and foreign policy, that had been announced in March through the Integrated Review. It was the first strike group deployment for the Queen Elizabeth-class aircraft carriers, and the first operational deployment of the UK Carrier Strike Group since 2011. The deployment was the largest single deployment of F-35 fighter aircraft since the programme started in 2006, and the largest fifth-generation fighter carrier air wing in the world at the time. Furthermore, HMS Queen Elizabeth saw the largest number of personnel embarked since she entered service, and the group contained the largest number of Royal Navy maritime helicopters deployed in over 10 years.

== Background ==
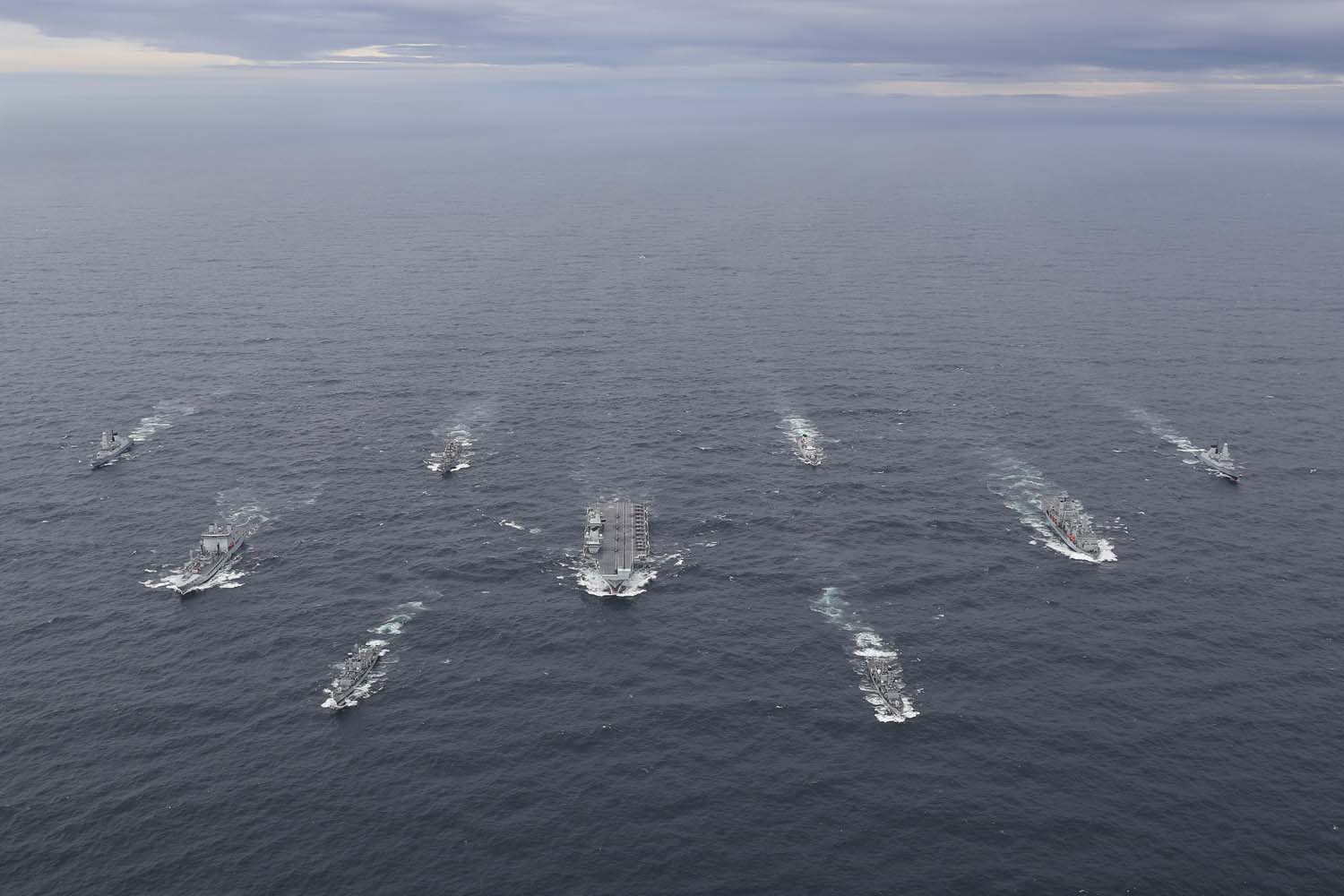
HMS Queen Elizabeth and her Carrier Strike Group during Exercise Joint Warrior 2020-2

The United Kingdom had been without a wholly-British deployable carrier strike group in almost 40 years; and without a deployable aircraft carrier altogether since 2014, when the final Invincible-class light aircraft carrier HMS Illustrious was decommissioned – three years ahead of the two replacement carriers.

The UK Carrier Strike Group re-formed in February 2015, with Commodore Jerry Kyd appointed as Commander United Kingdom Carrier Strike Group; only the next year however, Commodore Andrew Betton succeeded him as commander, as Kyd became the first sea-going captain of HMS Queen Elizabeth. HMS Queen Elizabeth was commissioned on 7 December 2017, and subsequently began the process of operational sea trials and training – including fixed-wing flying trials off the coast of the US. Subsequently, the UK Carrier Strike Group assembled for the first time in September 2019, when the Type 45 destroyer, HMS Dragon; Type 23 frigate, HMS Northumberland; and the Tide-class replenishment tanker, RFA Tideforce, came together to partake in NATO's Exercise Cutlass Fury, off the coast of Canada. This exercise also marked the first time that British F-35s (from No. 17 Test and Evaluation Squadron of the Royal Air Force) had landed on the Queen Elizabeth's deck. In September 2020, as part of NATO's Exercise Joint Warrior 2020–2, the full carrier strike group of nine surface vessels and accompanying air wing assembled for the first time in the North Sea, under the command of Commodore Steve Moorhouse. While the carrier strike group disbanded and the ships returned to their respective ports, the F-35Bs undertook further exercises from their base at RAF Marham, including partaking in Exercise Crimson Warrior, in preparation for the group's initial operating capability which was declared on 4 January 2021.

In 2016 the UK had moved a satellite in its Skynet military communications system eastward to extend coverage to east Asia and the western Pacific Ocean, and opened a ground station in Australia.

== Deployment preparations ==
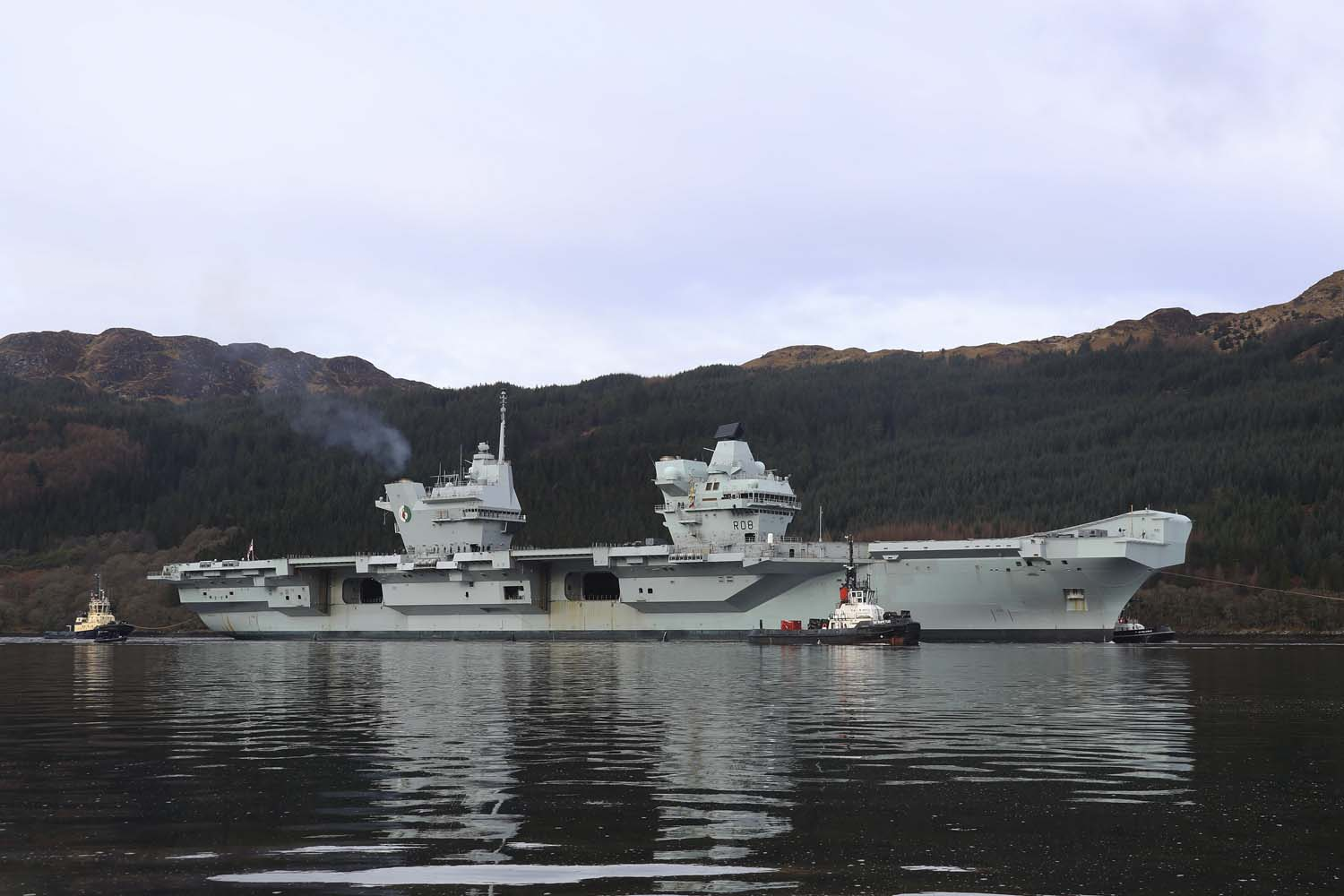
HMS Queen Elizabeth arrives in Glen Mallan to embark munitions

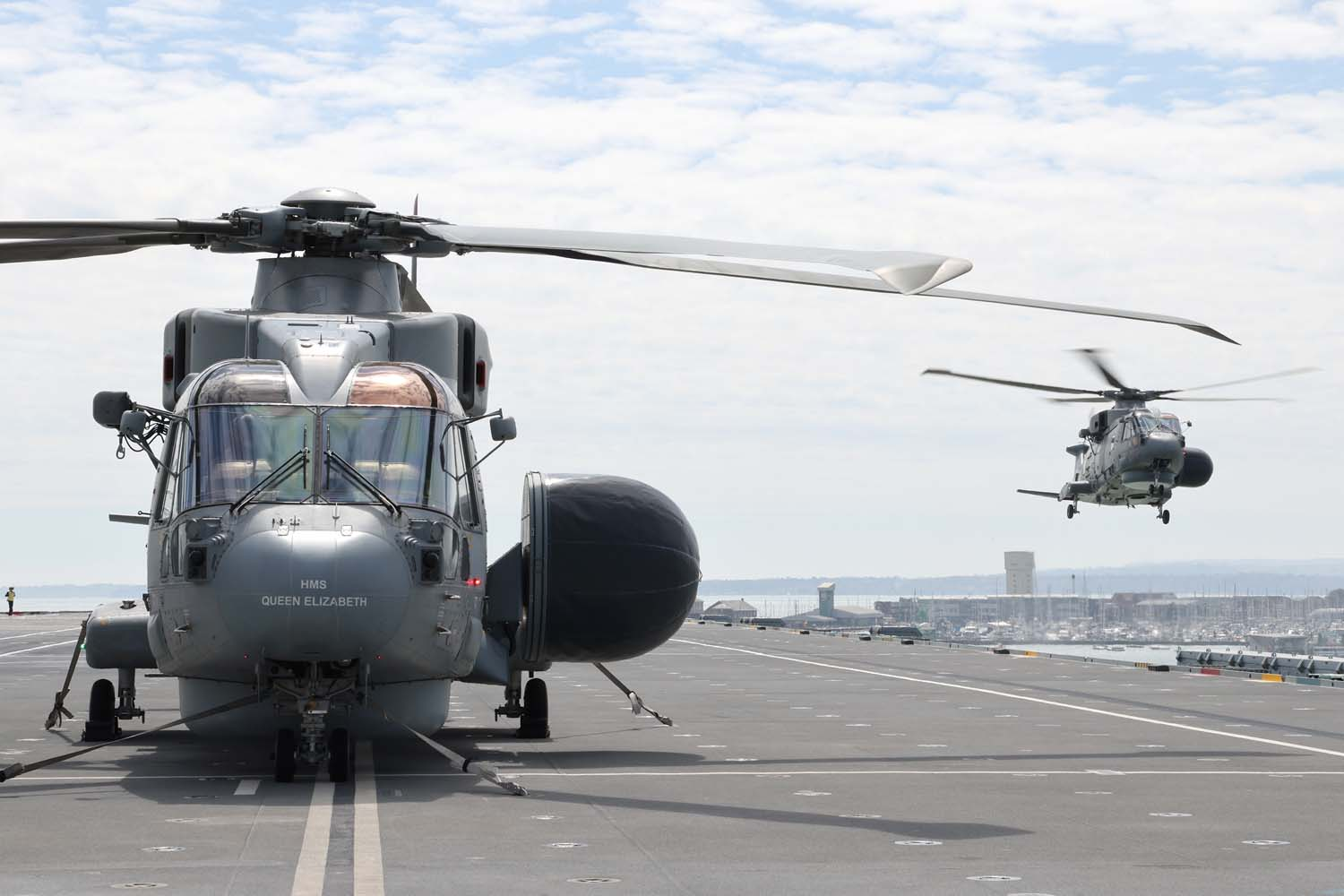
Merlin Mk2s land onboard HMS Queen Elizabeth; the Crowsnest radar is mounted on the side of the helicopter

HMS Queen Elizabeth departed HMNB Portsmouth on 1 March 2021, in order to conduct a period of working-up before deployment. She operated both in the English Channel and the Irish Sea to prepare the members of the ship's company, alongside this she conducted helicopter exercises with the Royal Air Force and the British Army's Army Air Corps to maintain the aircrew for carrier operations. Once finished, the carrier sailed up the British coast to Loch Long in order to embark munitions at the Northern Ammunition Jetty of Defence Munitions Glen Douglas, which had recently been extended by the Defence Infrastructure Organisation in order to accommodate the vessel. The ship was berthed there for five days between 15 and 20 March, before returning to Portsmouth. During her time in Scotland, the vessel also held a memorial service on board for the Second World War escort carrier HMS Dasher, which suffered a major internal explosion and sank off Ardrossan in March 1943.

In the middle of April, the Royal Navy began the process of administering COVID-19 vaccines to members of the carrier strike group in preparation for the deployment. The Secretary of State for Defence, Ben Wallace announced on 26 April that every sailor within the strike group would have received two vaccines prior to their departure.

USS The Sullivans departed Naval Station Mayport on 19 April, bound for the United Kingdom in order to join the carrier strike group for deployment. Between the 26 and 28 April, the 10 F-35B jets of the United States Marine Corps's Marine Fighter Attack Squadron 211 (VMFA-211) that contribute to the air group, arrived at RAF Lakenheath; the pilots that will operate with the strike group had already started a 14-day isolation period due to the COVID-19 pandemic. On 2 May, the first F-35B fighters belonging to VMFA-211 flew from RAF Lakenheath, and joined HMS Queen Elizabeth.

820 Naval Air Squadron spent the week before departure to Exercise Strike Warrior, on conducting dummy launch trials for the Sting Ray torpedo in Falmouth Bay; before its three Crowsnest airborne surveillance and control (ASaC), and four anti-submarine Merlin Mk2 helicopters embarked on the Queen Elizabeth on 27 April. The strike group's four Lynx Wildcat helicopters of 815 Naval Air Squadron left their base at RNAS Yeovilton on 1 May, and embarked on each of the four Royal Navy escorts. No. 617 Squadron RAF and their 8 F-35B fighters started to fly out of RAF Marham and embark on HMS Queen Elizabeth, on 3 May; before the final British aircraft to join the strike group, three Merlin Mk4s from 845 Naval Air Squadron, departed RNAS Yeovilton and joined RFA Fort Victoria later that day.

=== Exercise Virtual Warrior ===
During February 2021, the carrier strike group's warfare staff partook in Exercise Virtual Warrior, a command and control exercise which tested how the ship's crew would react in the event of a crisis on the maiden deployment. The exercise picked right back up from when the group disbanded the previous autumn, and took place at the Maritime Warfare School, at HMS Collingwood in Fareham, utilising the base's combined simulation training suite.

=== Exercise Strike Warrior ===
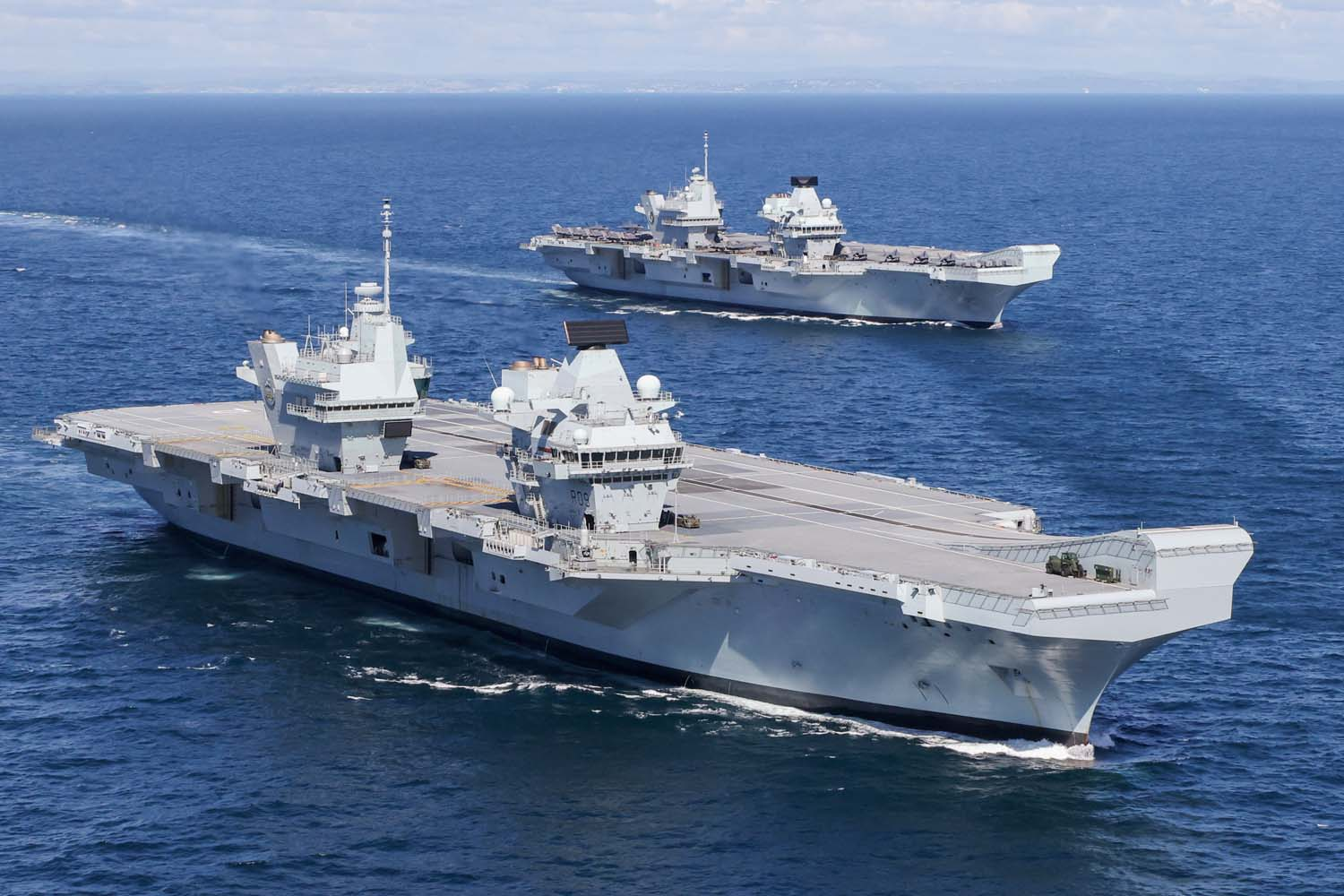
HMS Prince of Wales (front) and HMS Queen Elizabeth meet at sea for the first time

The strike group departed from their respective ports on 1 May: HMS Diamond, HMS Defender, HMS Kent, and HMS Queen Elizabeth from HMNB Portsmouth; HMS Richmond from HMNB Devonport; RFA Fort Victoria, and an Astute-class submarine from HMNB Clyde; and RFA Tidespring from Portland Harbour. The vessels then made their way to Scotland to partake in the final exercise before their deployment – the maritime element of NATO's UK-led Exercise Joint Warrior 2021–1, known as Exercise Strike Warrior, which saw the carrier strike group building on and enhancing the scenarios that were tested in the previously held Exercise Virtual Warrior. Taking place between 8 and 19 May, a total of 31 ships, 3 submarines, 150 aircraft, and 13,400 personnel from 10 nations took part in the exercise. Due to the COVID-19 pandemic, port visits were restricted to only those needed for operational and logistical reasons, and all personnel were required to isolate for 14 days before embarking onto their respective ships. The over 150 aircraft that were involved in the exercise were based at RAF Lossiemouth, HMS Gannet, and Stornoway Airport. The exercise saw two MV-22B Osprey from the Marine Medium Tiltrotor Squadron 162 stationed on board the USS Iwo Jima land on HMS Queen Elizabeth for the first time, along with the first launch of a Crowsnest radar-equipped Merlin helicopter from a Queen Elizabeth-class aircraft carrier, and the first Advanced Short Range Air to Air Missiles being fired from a British F-35 fighter – the first missile firings from a British jet at sea for 15 years. Nearing the end of Exercise Strike Warrior the Carrier Strike Group met up with the vessels of Exercise Ragnar Viking that had been taking place off the Norwegian coast, which included the USS Iwo Jima Amphibious Ready Group, the Royal Navy's Littoral Response Group (North), along with Normandie, HDMS Esbern Snare, and HNoMS Fridtjof Nansen; the 15 vessels together conducted a show of force Photo Exercise (PHOTEX).

=== Final departure ===
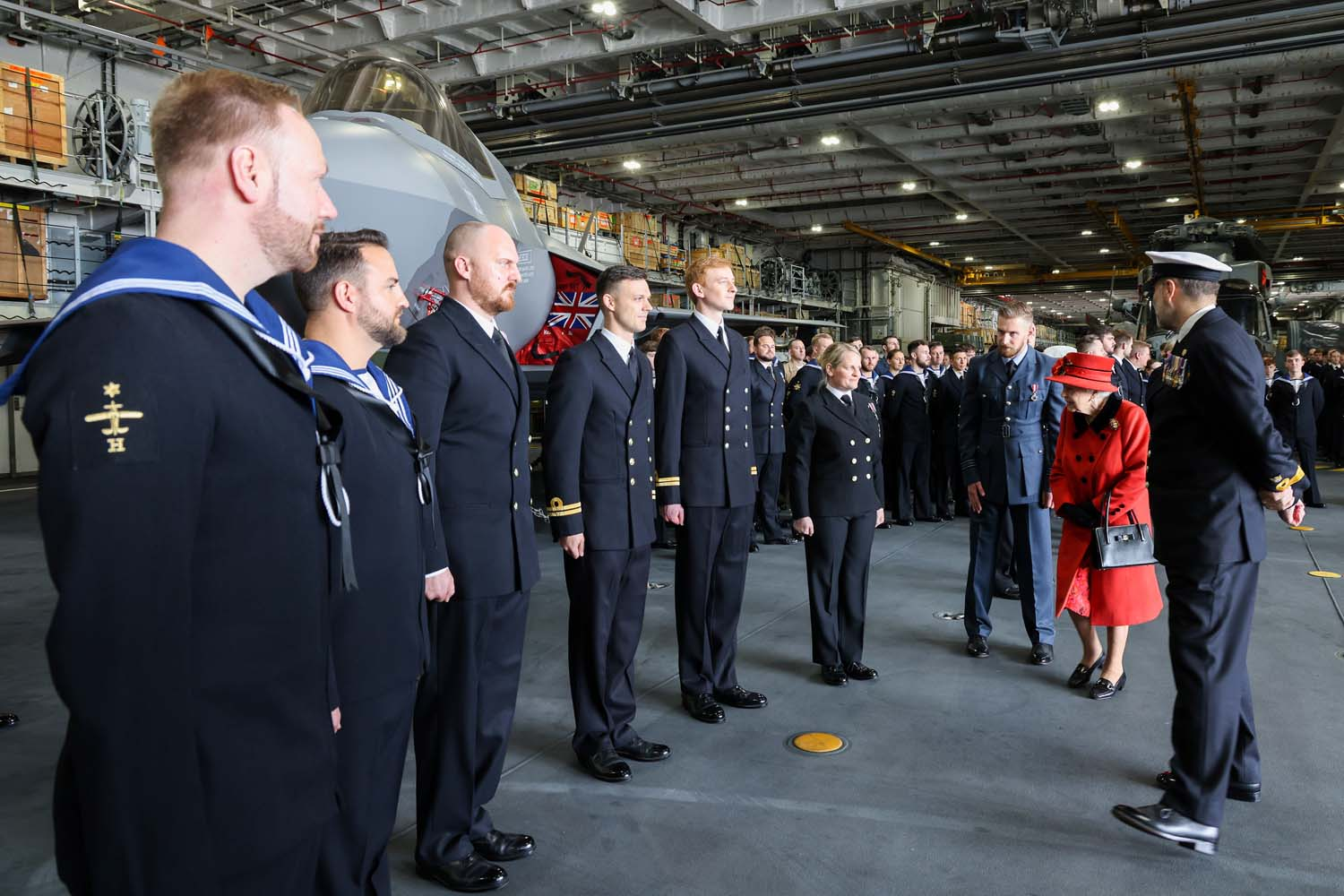
Queen Elizabeth II speaks to members of HMS Queen Elizabeth's company on 22 May, a few hours prior to their departure

Upon the culmination of Exercise Strike Warrior, the ships of the Carrier Strike Group each returned to port in order to embark the necessary fuel and stores. On the 19 May, on her way back to port, HMS Queen Elizabeth met up with her sister ship HMS Prince of Wales, which was undertaking Fleet Operational Sea Training, and sailed together for the first time before taking part in a PHOTEX, and finally parting ways. Originally, the Queen Elizabeth was scheduled to anchor in The Solent in order to maintain a COVID-secure state, however due to forecasted heavy winds, she instead docked alongside at HMNB Portsmouth with personnel remaining on board. On 21 May 2021, Prime Minister Boris Johnson visited HMS Queen Elizabeth in order to tour the ship and speak to the crew before their departure; followed by Queen Elizabeth II the next day, who also received a tour and spent time talking to crew members.

HNLMS Evertsen departed from Nieuwe Haven Naval Base in the Netherlands, on 22 May; along with HMS Defender and HMS Kent, which both sailed from Devonport also on 22 May. HMS Queen Elizabeth was originally planned to depart Portsmouth on 23 May, however in order to avoid the strong winds that had been forecasted, she instead left port in the evening of the 22 May, along with USS The Sullivans. On 23 May, HMS Diamond, RFA Fort Victoria, and RFA Tidespring departed from Devonport, Portland, and Loch Striven respectively; The final ship, HMS Richmond, left Portsmouth on 24 May. Once the Carrier Strike Group departed from the UK, operational command of the group passed from the Fleet Commander, Vice Admiral Jerry Kyd, over to the Chief of Joint Operations, Vice Admiral Ben Key.

== Deployment ==
The plan for the 28 week deployment was for the carrier strike group cover 26,000 nautical miles, and conduct over 70 engagements in 40 different countries.

On 1 May 2021, it was announced that a documentary crew, including the documentary film maker Chris Terrill and shooting Producer Annika Hagemann, will be onboard HMS Queen Elizabeth for the duration of the deployment, in order to produce a six-part documentary series for the BBC in succession to Chris Terrill's two previous series about life on the carrier.

=== Exercise Steadfast Defender and Exercise Atlantic Trident ===
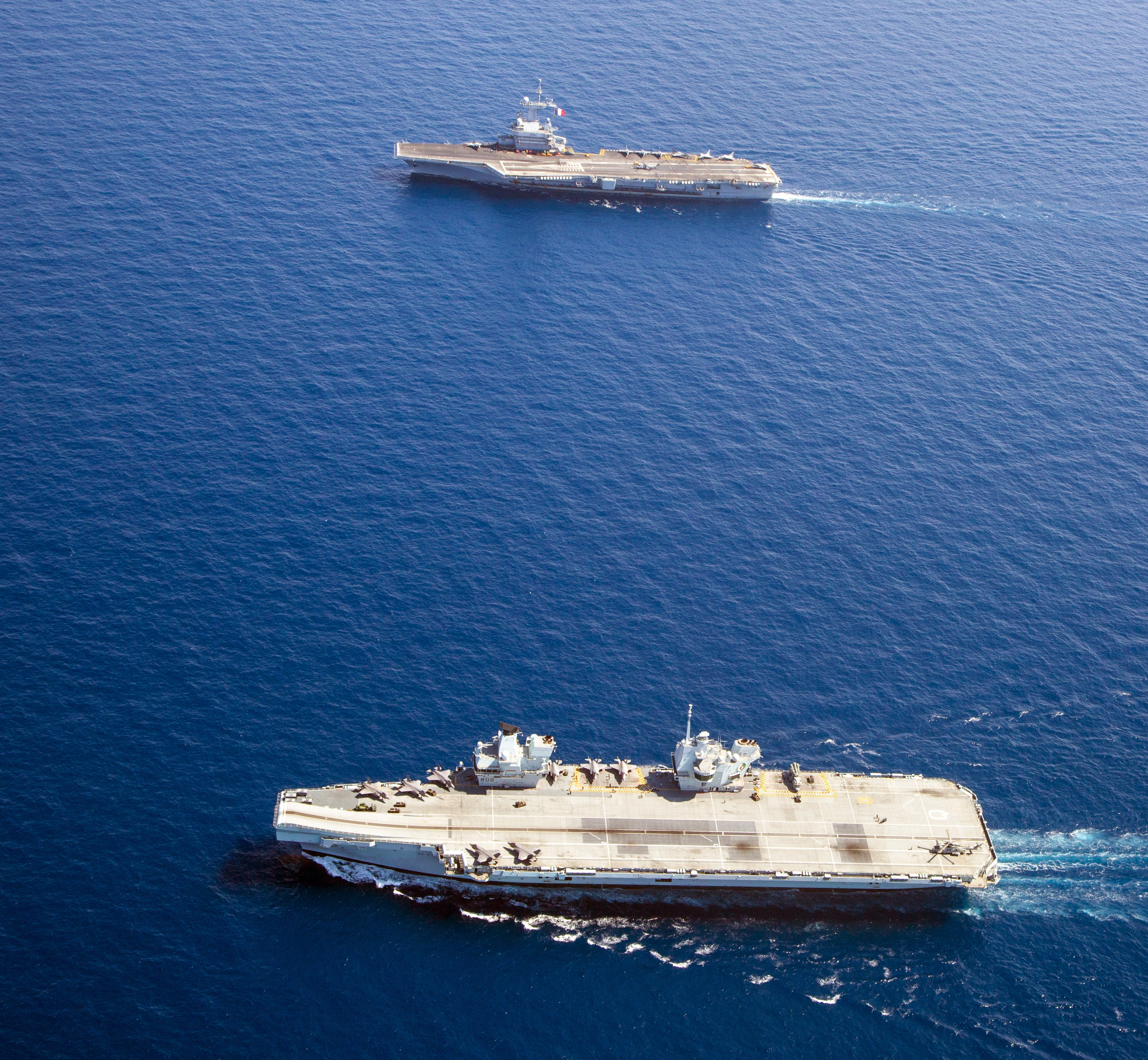
Queen Elizabeth and Charles de Gaulle underway in the Mediterranean Sea, 3 June 2021.

Initially after leaving Portsmouth on the 22 May, the group straight away entered into another major NATO exercise – Exercise Steadfast Defender. Between 20 and 28 May in the Eastern Atlantic Ocean off the coast of Portugal, the maritime element of the exercise included 18 vessels from 11 different nations, and was directed from the newly raised Joint Force Command Norfolk based on board the USS Mount Whitney. The exercise included the carrier strike group and the USS Iwo Jima Amphibious Ready Group, along with both Standing NATO Maritime Group 1 and 2.

Concurrently, the embarked aircraft of 617 Squadron took part in Exercise Atlantic Trident 2021 over the south west French coast. The exercise ran from 17 to 28 May, with the Armee de l'Air, United States Air Force, and Royal Air Force all taking part in the French-led exercise, which was directed from Mont-de-Marsan Air Base.

=== June–December ===
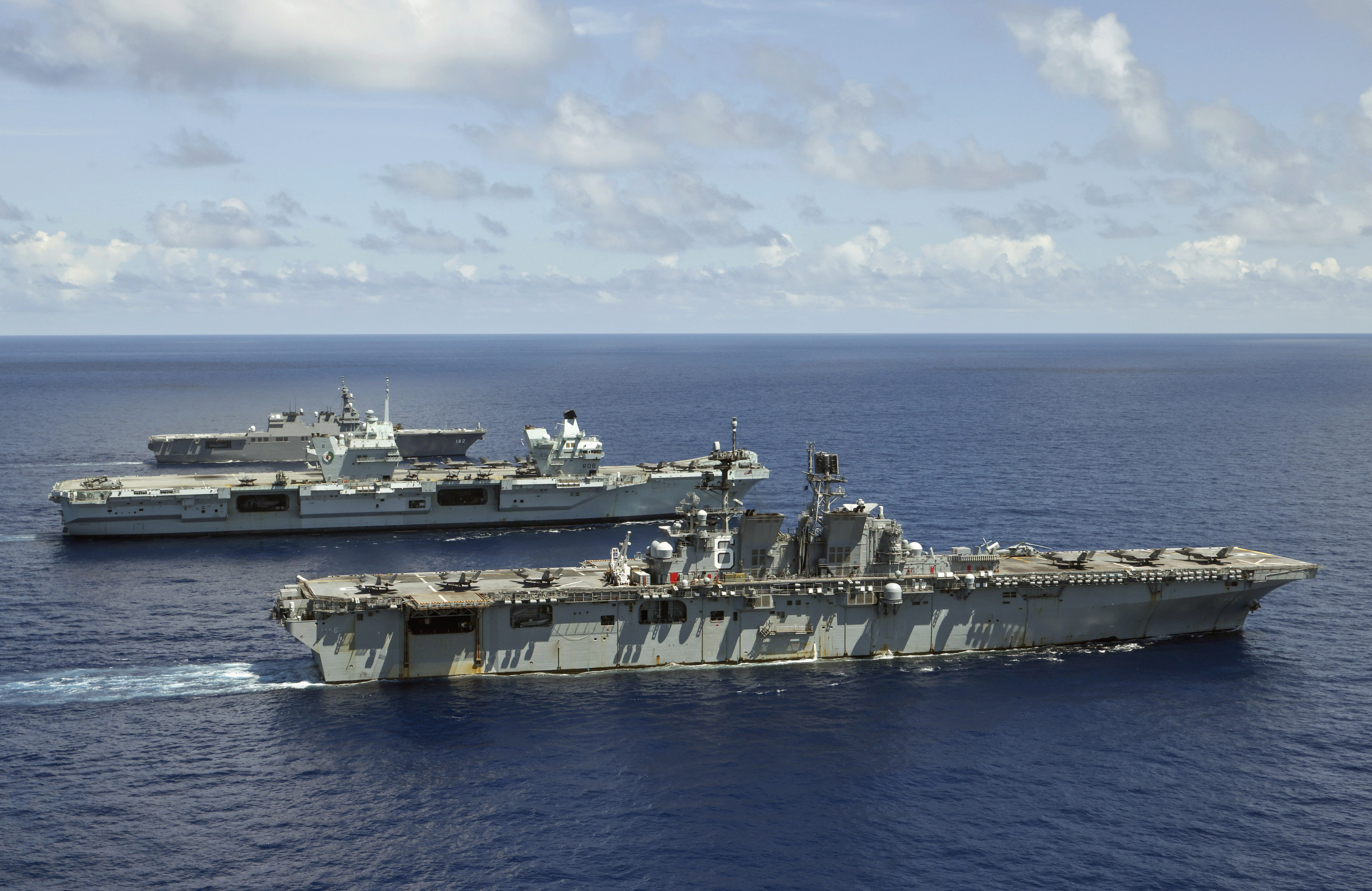
HMS Queen Elizabeth alongside USS America and JS Ise on 24 August 2021.

After finishing Exercise Steadfast Defender, the strike group made its first port visit in Gibraltar. After leaving port, the group entered the Mediterranean, where it undertook further exercises with Mediterranean NATO allies, including operating with the French aircraft carrier Charles de Gaulle, before arriving at Souda Bay in Crete for a logistic stop. Prior to this however, HMS Defender, HMS Kent, and HNLMS Evertsen detached from the group and entered the Black Sea – a visit that was already planned prior to the heightened Russian activity in the region. Whilst in the Mediterranean, the strike group joined Operation Shader in the fight against Daesh; before continuing on through the Suez Canal and stopping at the British military port in Duqm. However, HMS Diamond was forced to remain in European waters having suffered a serious engine defect. After the stopover at Duqm, the group proceeded across the Arabian Sea to conduct exercises with the Indian Navy in the Indian Ocean, before calling for a brief stop at the British naval facility in Singapore. It entered the disputed South China Sea region to conduct freedom of navigation exercises in the area. Whilst there, the strike group tracked Chinese submarines and used its anti-submarine assets to hold them off, allowing HMS Queen Elizabeth to steer clear. As of 3 September 2021 it was reported that Diamond had completed repairs, undertaken in Taranto, Italy and had put to sea to re-join the strike group.

Subsequently, the group took part in Exercise Bersama Gold 21 with the Royal Australian Navy, Royal New Zealand Navy, Royal Malaysian Navy and Republic of Singapore Navy, to celebrate the 50th anniversary of the Five Power Defence Arrangements; before paying a visit to South Korea and then conducting exercises with the Japan Maritime Self-Defense Force and United States Navy around the islands of Japan. Whilst in the Indo-Pacific region HMS Tamar and HMS Spey, the Royal Navy's newly established permanent presence in the region, met up with the strike group, having just arrived in the area.

In October, the strike group began its journey home - on 20 October, The Sullivans detached to begin its return to its home base of Mayport. On 16 November, one of the carrier's F-35B fighters, from 617 Squadron, crashed during operations in the Mediterranean. The pilot was able to eject safely. Early reports suggest some of "the covers and engine blanks" had not been removed before takeoff. Regular flying operations continued following the crash, with a multilateral cross-decking exercise that saw Italian aircraft operating from the Italian Navy flagship Cavour land, refuel and launch from the deck of Queen Elizabeth, and US aircraft operate from the Italian ship. The strike group finally returned to the United Kingdom at the beginning of December.

== Composition ==
Composition of Carrier Strike Group 21
Aircraft carrier	Queen Elizabeth class	HMS Queen Elizabeth (R08)
Destroyers	Type 45 (anti-air warfare)	HMS Defender (D36)
Destroyers	Type 45 (anti-air warfare)	HMS Diamond (D34)
Destroyers	Arleigh Burke class (multi-role)	USS The Sullivans (DDG-68)
Frigates	Type 23 (anti-submarine warfare)	HMS Richmond (F239)
Frigates	Type 23 (anti-submarine warfare)	HMS Kent (F78)
Frigates	De Zeven Provinciën class (air-defence & command)	HNLMS Evertsen (F805)
Auxiliaries	Tide class (fast fleet tanker)	RFA Tidespring (A136)
Auxiliaries	Tide class (fast fleet tanker)	RFA Tidesurge (A138) (Mediterranean return only)
Auxiliaries	Fort Victoria class (replenishment oiler)	RFA Fort Victoria (A387)
Submarine	Astute class (fleet-submarine)	HMS Astute (S119)

Composition of carrier air wing
Fighter	No. 617 Squadron RAF	8 × F-35B Lightning
Fighter	Marine Fighter Attack Squadron 211	10 × F-35B Lightning
Airborne surveillance and control	820 Naval Air Squadron	3 × Merlin Mk2 Crowsnest
Anti-submarine	820 Naval Air Squadron	4 × Merlin Mk2 ASW
Troop transport/logistics	845 Naval Air Squadron attached to RFA Fort Victoria	3 × Merlin Mk4

Other aircraft
Force protection	815 Naval Air Squadron attached to Royal Navy escorts	4 × Wildcat

Alongside the major units mentioned, the group also consist of a number of personnel drawn from other units, including:

- A company of Royal Marines from 42 Commando for forming boarding teams, force protection, and aircrew recovery.
- Elements of 1700 Naval Air Squadron, to provide aviation support.

=== Carrier air wing ===
==== 820 Naval Air Squadron ====
820 Naval Air Squadron (820 NAS) of the Royal Navy, composed of around 190 personnel and seven Merlin Mk2 (including 3 equipped with Crowsnest radar), provide airborne surveillance and control, and airborne anti-submarine capabilities. The anti-submarine aircraft can either be equipped with depth-charges or Sting Ray torpedoes, in order to protect the strike group from both submarines and threats above the water; whilst the Crowsnest-equipped aircraft provide long-range, early-warning capability and can also be used to direct F-35B fighters on to their target.

==== VMFA-211 ====
Ten of the air wing's eighteen fighters were from Marine Fighter Attack Squadron 211 (VMFA-211) of the United States Marine Corps, nicknamed the "Wake Island Avengers". The strike group was the single largest deployment of the F-35 fighter since the beginning of the programme in 2006, and was also the first time the USMC has deployed a full F-35 squadron of 10 aircraft; USMC squadrons had 16 aircraft until reforms by General David Berger that are intended to transition the USMC to a lighter, more agile force. Lieutenant Colonel Andrew D'Ambrogi, the commanding officer of VMFA-211, said that the deployment was a chance to experiment with the downsized squadron and ensure that it is capable enough to meet the output that is required to execute the mission. The US contingent included 180 U.S. Marines to maintain and handle the aircraft on the flight deck and a team of 18 United States Navy ordnance specialists who handled the ordnance required by the Marine Corps fighters, as that is not a Marine activity and policy does not allow for another country to do so.
