= Operation Fortis =

Operation Fortis could refer to:

- Operation Fortis, the investigation into the 2018 Amesbury poisonings
- Operation Fortis, the deployment of the United Kingdom Carrier Strike Group 21
