= British Defence Singapore Support Unit =

British naval facility in Singapore

- Sembawang, Singapore

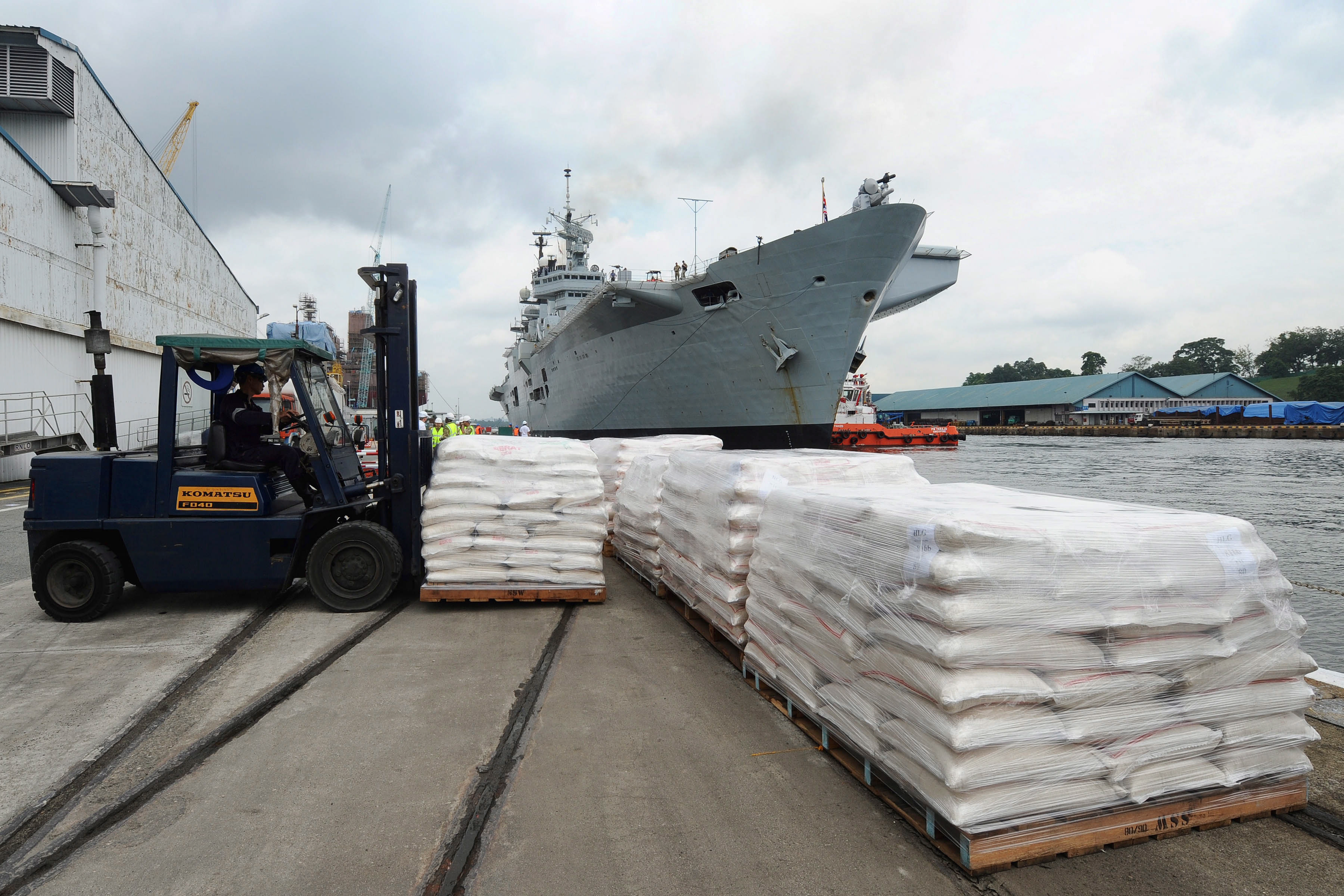
- HMS Illustrious at the facility in 2013.

Site information
- Type: Naval Base
- Owner: United Kingdom
- Operator: Strategic Command
- Controlled by: Director of Overseas Bases
- Condition: Operational

Location
- Location in Singapore
- Coordinates: 1°27′46.8″N 103°49′59.7″E

Site history
- Built: 1938; 88 years ago (as HMNB Singapore)
- In use: 1938–present

Garrison information
- Current commander: Edwin Cooper
- Occupants: Executive Officer James Gravey Wharf Master Tanzi Lees

The British Defence Singapore Support Unit (BDSSU) is a British naval facility located in Sembawang, Singapore. A remnant of a larger naval base, known as HMNB Singapore, the facility provides fuel and other supplies to Royal Navy ships in the region, as well as those of other countries. It is the only permanent Royal Navy presence to remain at the former naval base, which is maintained by Naval Party 1022 under the auspices of the Five Power Defence Arrangements (FPDA).

== History ==
=== 1938–2010 ===
The facility has its origins in the larger HMNB Singapore (also known as HMS Terror), a naval base which was established by the United Kingdom during World War II as a cornerstone of its Singapore strategy. In 1942, the Battle of Singapore resulted in the base being taken over by Japan. However, after the surrender of Japan in 1945, the base was returned to British control.

After World War II, the naval base was gradually reduced in size after Singapore gained independence in 1965 and it was ultimately handed over to Singapore in 1968. The base was then largely converted into a commercial dockyard, known as Sembawang Shipyard Pte Ltd. However, some facilities were retained and maintained by ANZUK, an alliance between Australia, New Zealand and the United Kingdom to defend Singapore and Malaysia after the United Kingdom withdrew its forces from the East of Suez. ANZUK was replaced by the Five Power Defence Arrangements (FPDA), which included both Malaysia and Singapore, in 1971. The BDSSU was one such facility maintained by the UK in order to support its FPDA commitments.

=== 2010–2020 ===
In November 2013, the Royal Navy aircraft carrier HMS Illustrious visited the facility and was equipped with humanitarian aid and supplies destined for the Philippines in the wake of Typhoon Haiyan. Over 500 tonnes of equipment and stores were supplied to the ship in what the Royal Navy described as the "most ambitious storing that a Royal Navy ship has attempted to do within 24 hours" since the Falklands War in 1982.

As a repair and logistics support facility, the BDSSU was underutilized by the Royal Navy until 2018, when the UK began a strategic return East of Suez. The consequent re-surge in activity saw the facility supporting HMS Sutherland, HMS Albion, HMS Argyll and HMS Montrose within a 12-month period — the largest deployment of British warships to the region since the Korean War in the 1950s. During this period, the facility provided more fuel than all of the naval bases in the United Kingdom.

As part of an initiative to re-engage with the world after Brexit, the UK began evaluating options for a military base in the Far East in 2019. Singapore was among the options under consideration.

After a period where the unit was led by a civilian from the Defence Infrastructure Organisation, Acting Commander James Bradshaw, formerly Commander of the Royal Navy Gibraltar Squadron, assumed command as Commander BDSSU in March 2017. Commander Paul Bastiaens arrived in Singapore in January 2018. In November 2020, Tim Hutchins became the unit's commander, succeeding Commander Paul Bastiaens. At the time of his appointment, the unit comprised 33 personnel, consisting of UK service personnel and civilian contractors. An average of 120 vessels had also visited the unit over the past five years — primarily from the FPDA navies and the United States Navy — making it one of the busiest UK military-operated ports for frigate and destroyer movements. His appointment came as the unit prepared to support the 50th anniversary of Exercise Bersama Lima, a military exercise held by the FPDA.

=== 2020–present ===
In July 2021, the Royal Navy's UK Carrier Strike Group 21, led by aircraft carrier HMS Queen Elizabeth, visited Singapore on its debut operational deployment. At least one ship from the strike group, the auxiliary RFA Tidespring, visited the BDSSU to resupply on fuel, food, stores and mail. Another ship, Type 45 destroyer HMS Diamond, also visited the facility after experiencing technical issues at sea.

In May 2021, the Royal Navy announced that two River-class offshore patrol vessels, HMS Tamar and HMS Spey, would be permanently based in the Indo-Pacific region with the new Type 31 frigates joining them in future. The ships will use the BDSSU as their primary logistics hub.

In August 2025, four ships from UK Carrier Strike Group 25 visited the BDSSU, namely HMS Dauntless, RFA Tidespring, HMNZS Te Kaha and HMAS Sydney.

== See also ==
- Singapore–United Kingdom relations
- Overseas military bases of the United Kingdom
- List of Royal Navy shore establishments
- Task Force 73 - US Naval Logistics Group based at the same port
