= UK Carrier Strike Group =

Formation of the Royal Navy (created 2006)

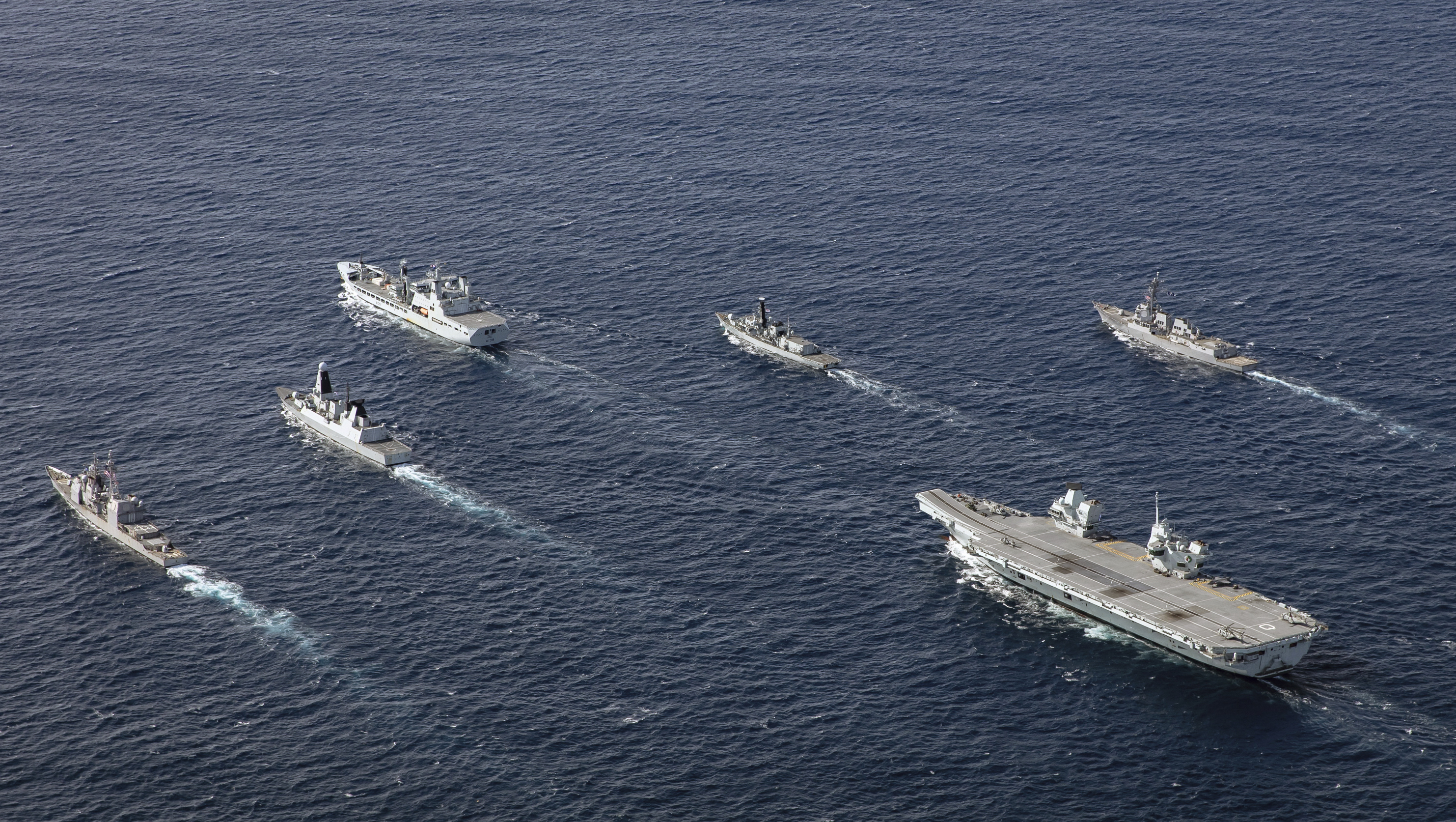
- HMS Queen Elizabeth and her carrier strike group during Exercise Westlant 19 (Nov 2019)
- Active: 2006 – 2011; 2015 – present
- Country: United Kingdom
- Branch: Royal Navy
- Type: Carrier battle group
- Size: 1 x Queen Elizabeth-class carrier; 2+ x escorts (Type 45 destroyer and Type 23 frigate); 1+ x AOR; 1+ x Astute attack submarine

Commanders
- Current commander: Commodore James Blackmore Commander United Kingdom Carrier Strike Group

Aircraft flown
- Attack: F-35B Lightning II, Wildcat HMA2
- Fighter: F-35B Lightning II
- Attack helicopter: Apache AH1, Wildcat AH1
- Patrol: Merlin HM2, Wildcat HMA2, Merlin HM2 Crowsnest
- Transport: Merlin Mk3i/4, Chinook HC4/5/6/6A, T-150 heavy-lift drones

The UK Carrier Strike Group (UKCSG) is a carrier battle group of the Royal Navy. It has existed in various forms since the mid-2000s. Between 2006 and 2011, the formation centred around the Royal Navy's Invincible-class aircraft carriers until the retirement of their Harrier GR9 strike aircraft in 2011 as a result of the Strategic Defence and Security Review. The UKCSG subsequently returned in February 2015 ahead of the entry into service of the new Queen Elizabeth-class aircraft carriers, HMS Queen Elizabeth and HMS Prince of Wales. The aim of the CSG is to facilitate carrier-enabled power projection.

== Overview ==
=== Role ===
As a unit within the Royal Navy, the UK Carrier Strike Group's role is to facilitate carrier-enabled power projection (CEPP) in support of the UK's interests. As a self-contained force, it is capable of operating independently or as part of a wider operation. The unit is centred around either of two Queen Elizabeth-class aircraft carriers, which are designed to carry up to 40 aircraft each, with accompanying surface ships and submarines providing protection from air, surface and undersea threats. Initially, only one carrier strike group was to be maintained, however, under current strategic planning, two carrier strike groups will now be maintained with one held at very high readiness and the other at lower readiness. Both of these groups can surge and form a combined unit if required.

=== Size and composition ===
The size and composition of the UKCSG varies depending on operational requirements which are decided upon during operational planning. A typical CSG consists of a Queen Elizabeth-class aircraft carrier, two surface escorts (with one being a Type 23 frigate for anti-submarine warfare and the other being a Type 45 destroyer for anti-air warfare), a submarine and a fleet tanker. In the future, escort duties will also be provided by the Royal Navy's new Type 26 and Type 31 frigates. For replenishment-at-sea, the Royal Fleet Auxiliary provides its Tide-class fleet tankers, which were specifically designed to refuel the aircraft carriers, in addition to RFA Fort Victoria for dry stores. Fort Victoria is the only ship capable of resupplying the aircraft carriers with dry stores but a programme to replace her with three new fleet solid support ships is underway, aiming to deliver the first new vessel in 2031. As of 2024, the Royal Navy and Royal Fleet Auxiliary were experiencing considerable challenges keeping adequate numbers of destroyers, frigates and support ships at sea due to both personnel shortages and because of the age of some vessels. Until adequate numbers of escorts and support ships become more readily available (as newer vessels are projected to enter service in the latter 2020s and early 2030s), the deployment of a carrier strike group is increasingly reliant on ships provided by allies. Overseas, the UK has established a number of naval facilities to support the UKCSG, including the naval base HMS Jufair and the UK Joint Logistics Support Base, which are located in Bahrain and Oman, respectively.

The Queen Elizabeth-class aircraft carriers are designed to carry around 40 aircraft but can carry up to 72 at maximum capacity. Its Carrier Air Wing (CVW) will consist of up to 24 F-35B Lightning II multirole fighters by 2023. This is in addition to around 14 helicopters of varying types. For a maritime force protection tasking, the CVW may consist of Merlin HM2 helicopters operating in both the anti-submarine warfare and airborne early warning (AEW) roles. For a littoral manoeuvre package, it may consist of a mixture of Chinook and Merlin Mk3i/4 transport helicopters and Apache AH1 and/or Wildcat AH1 attack helicopters. By 2030, the Royal Navy aims to replace some of these helicopter platforms with medium-sized fixed wing unmanned aerial vehicles, currently known as Vixens, capable of undertaking strike, air-to-air refueling, electronic warfare and airborne early warning missions.

=== Previous formations ===
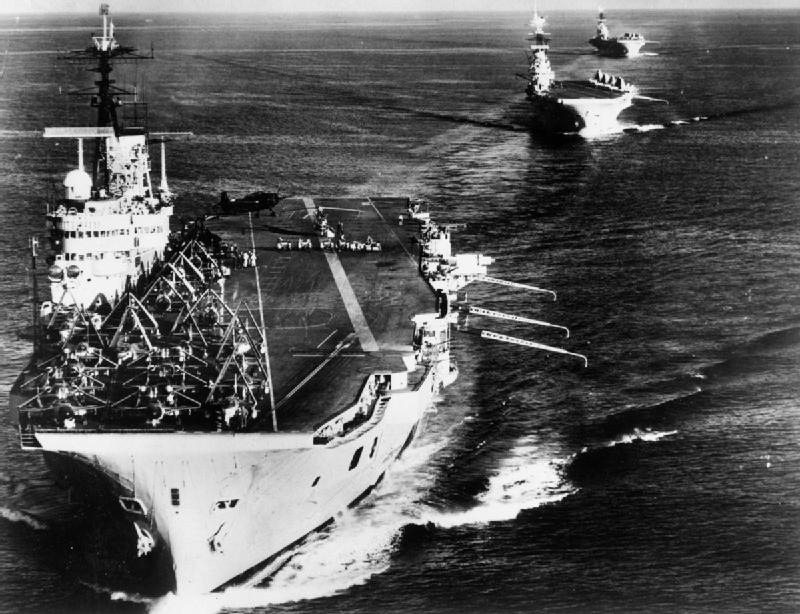
Eagle, Bulwark, and Albion during the Suez Crisis (1956)

The Royal Navy has operated task groups centred around aircraft carriers since the introduction of HMS Argus, the world's first aircraft carrier with a full-length flight deck, in 1918. During the Second World War, it operated 85 aircraft carriers of various types which were deployed in task forces alongside battleships, destroyers and cruisers.

In 1950, during the Korea War, the Royal Navy deployed several aircraft carriers as part of a Commonwealth Task Force, which also comprised seven cruisers, eight destroyers, 14 frigates, two submarines, two depot ships, twelve tankers and a hospital ship. In 1956, during the Suez Crisis, the Mediterranean Fleet formed a combined naval task force with the French, named Task Force 345, which comprised five aircraft carriers, in addition to numerous cruisers, destroyers, frigates, minelayers, minesweepers and assault ships.

The 1982 Falklands War saw the deployment of a 127-ship naval task force to retake the Falkland Islands and South Georgia and the South Sandwich Islands after they had been captured by Argentina. Rear Admiral Sandy Woodward, Flag Officer First Flotilla, was the senior officer off the Falklands, reporting to CINCFLEET. The aircraft carrier group, named Task Group 317.8, included the aircraft carriers HMS Hermes and HMS Invincible, alongside numerous escort and support ships.

During the 1990s, the Royal Navy deployed the aircraft carriers HMS Ark Royal and HMS Invincible during the Yugoslav Wars. Ark Royal was the first to deploy as the lead ship of Task Group 612.02, which also included two frigates and three support ships. In January 1993, then-Captain Jeremy Blackham was appointed Commander Task Group 612.02, responsible directly to CINCFLEET, to support British UNPROFOR troops ashore, including, if necessary, helping them withdraw. Harrier jets operating from both carriers saw action, and one was shot down by an enemy surface-to-air missile.

In 2000, the aircraft carrier HMS Illustrious provided air protection for British forces involved in Operation Palliser, the British military intervention in the Sierra Leone Civil War. She operated as part of a task force which also included two escorts, a helicopter carrier and five support ships. Commodore Niall Kilgour, Commander Amphibious Task Group, served as the seagoing commander for the operation.

Commander Amphibious Task Group deployments included Operation Veritas in 2001. Commodore A.J.G. Miller became COMATG in July 2001. After September 2001, Illustrious also provided air protection to coalition forces during the invasion phase of the War in Afghanistan (2001–2021). She was accompanied by three escorts and eight support ships. The ATG was also deployed for Operation Telic, the 2003 invasion of Iraq. HMS Ark Royal participated in the Iraq War as a helicopter carrier, alongside six escorts, eight minehunters, two submarines, a helicopter carrier and numerous support ships. Miller handed over command to his successor in September 2003.

Other previous deploying Royal Navy carrier commanders were Flag Officer, Third Flotilla and Commander United Kingdom Task Group.

== Operational history (2006–2011) ==
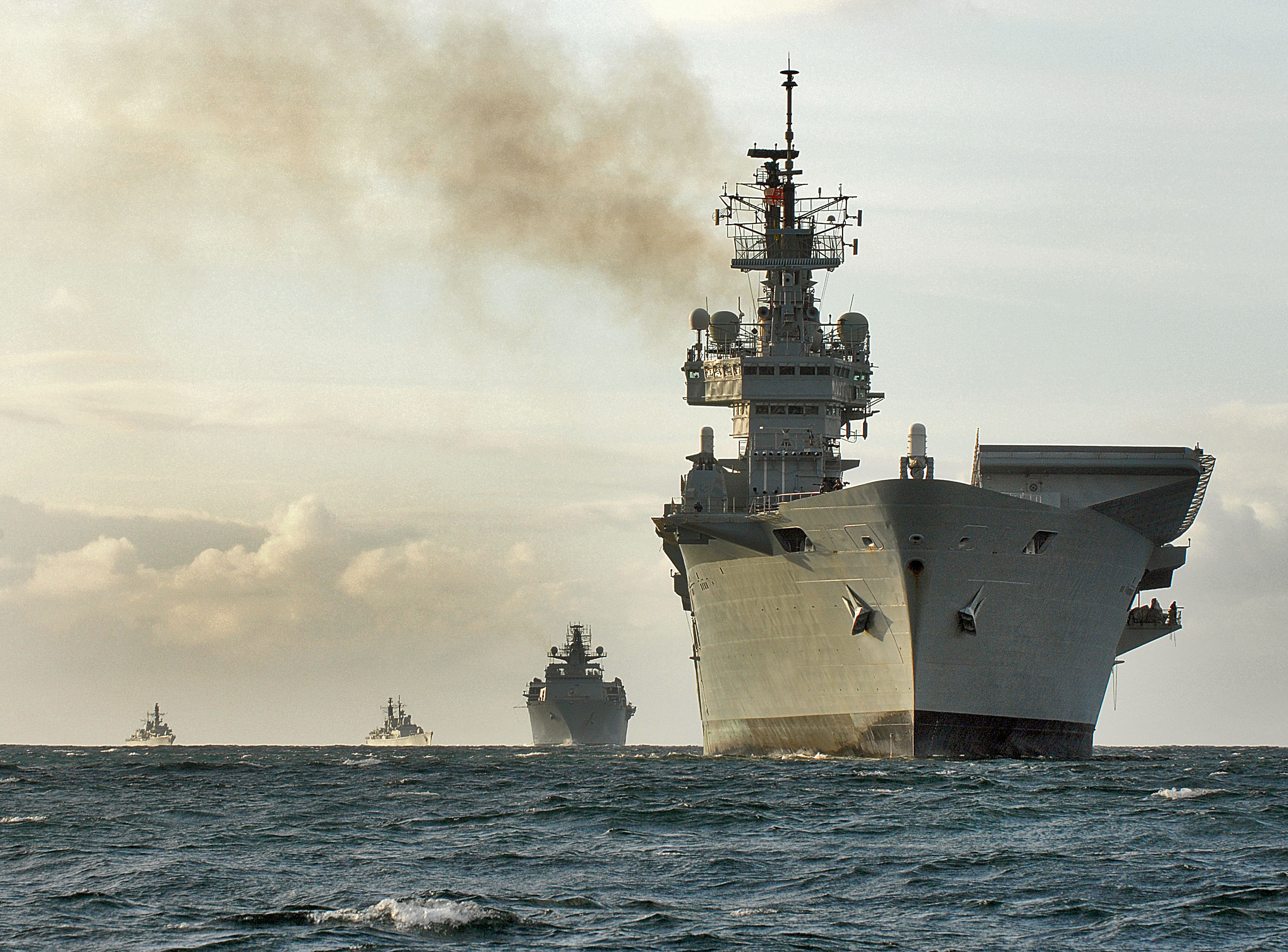
HMS Ark Royal and the UK Carrier Strike Group during Exercise Joint Warrior (Oct 2008)

The earliest iteration of the UK Carrier Strike Group originally formed in 2006 with Commodore Alan Richards in command. It centred around either of two Invincible-class aircraft carriers, HMS Illustrious and HMS Ark Royal. In one of its final deployments, it demonstrated its capabilities alongside the US Navy off the east coast of the United States during Exercise Auriga in 2010. Following the exercise, the captain of Ark Royal remarked: "Today was a great opportunity for us to demonstrate some of the capabilities that the UK Carrier Strike Group has, particularly the GR9 Harrier and Merlin ASW helicopters operating from HMS Ark Royal". As an example of the size and composition of a UK CSG of that era, the Auriga CSG consisted of the aircraft carrier HMS Ark Royal, along with her air wing of Harrier GR9 strike aircraft, Merlin HM1 anti-submarine warfare (ASW) helicopters and Sea King MK7 airborne surveillance and control (ASaC) helicopters. The aircraft carrier was escorted by the Type 42 destroyer HMS Liverpool and Type 23 frigate HMS Sutherland, in addition to French Navy submarine Perle and US Navy destroyer USS Barry. RFA Fort George of the Royal Fleet Auxiliary provided replenishment.

In 2010, the British government announced that all Harriers would be retired from service, along with HMS Ark Royal. This left Illustrious serving in a helicopter carrier role whilst replacement aircraft carriers and their associated air wings were procured. The UK Carrier Strike Group dissolved in 2011 with Commodore Simon J. Ancona as its final commander. Illustrious later went on to decommission in 2014, three years ahead of her replacements' entry into service.

== Operational history (2015–present) ==
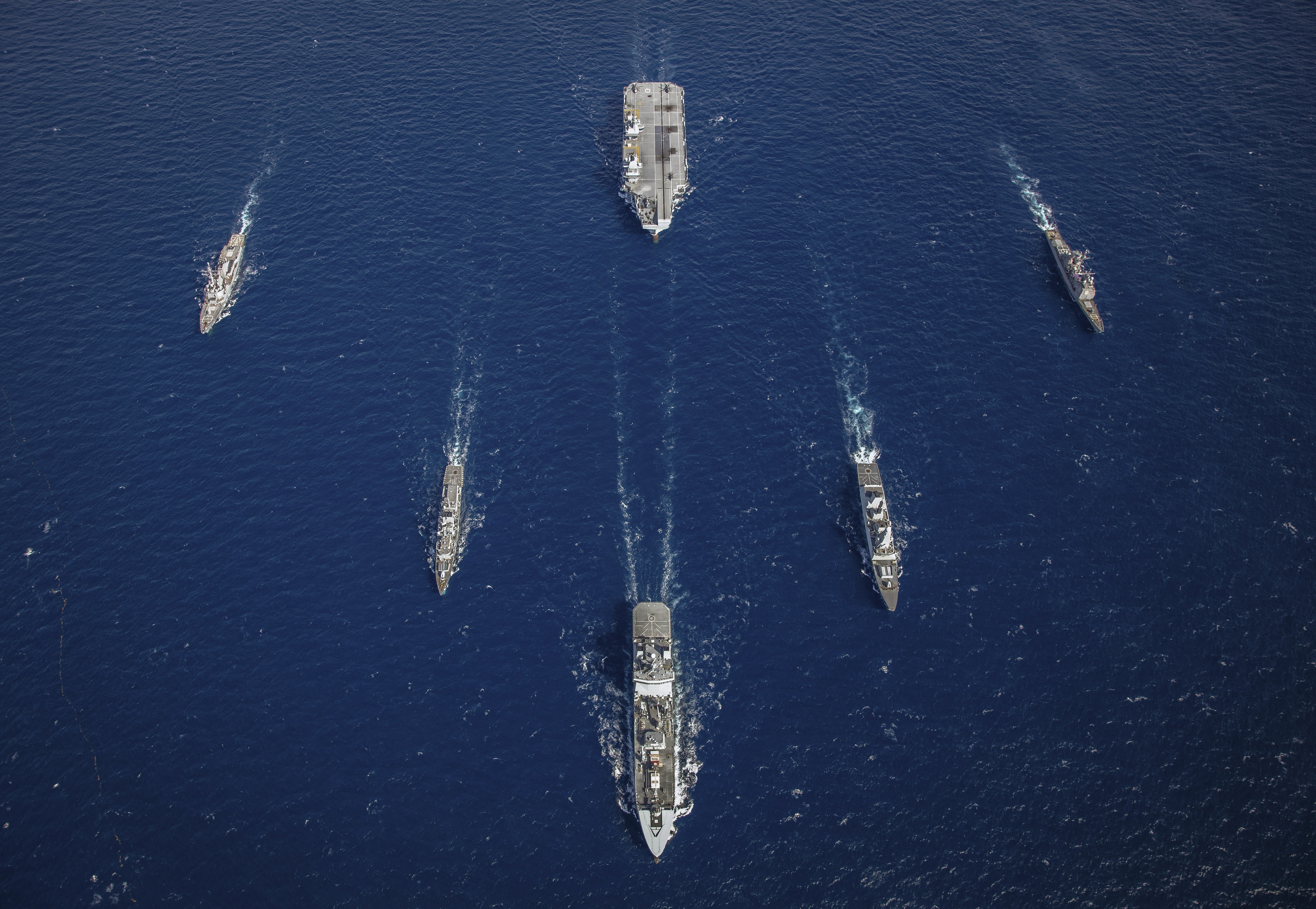
HMS Queen Elizabeth and the UK Carrier Strike Group during Exercise Westlant 19, supported by two US Navy escorts (Nov 2019)

In 2015, the UKCSG was re-formed with Commodore Jerry Kyd as its commander. Under his direction, the UK CSG battle staff grew to include 22 core one-star battle staff by 2016. Kyd was later succeeded by Commodore Andrew Betton during the same year, who himself was succeeded in 2018 by Commodore Mike Utley, before the current commander, Commodore Stephan Moorhouse, took command in 2019. Prior to the entry into service of HMS Queen Elizabeth and her sister ship Prince of Wales, the Royal Navy cooperated with its allies to preserve and develop its skills in carrier strike group operations. This primarily involved Royal Navy ships and personnel training with US Navy and French carrier strike groups.

The current UKCSG assembled at sea for the first time in October 2020 during Exercise Joint Warrior. It comprised a total of nine ships, 15 fighter aircraft (five from the Royal Air Force and 10 from the US Marine Corps), 11 helicopters and 3,000 personnel. The Royal Navy ships included the aircraft carrier HMS Queen Elizabeth along with two frigates, two destroyers, a replenishment ship and a solid support ship. The US Navy and Royal Netherlands Navy also provided an escort each. The exercise saw the largest number of aircraft on a British aircraft carrier since 1983, in addition to the largest number of F-35Bs at sea across the globe. The exercise was a rehearsal for an operational deployment scheduled for 2021, known as CSG21.

Following Exercise Joint Warrior, the UK CSG reached its initial operating capability (IOC) milestone in January 2021. This milestone marked the successful operation of all components of the CSG and made it available for operational deployments for the first time.

=== Carrier Strike Group 21 (Operation Fortis, Exercise Steadfast Defender) ===
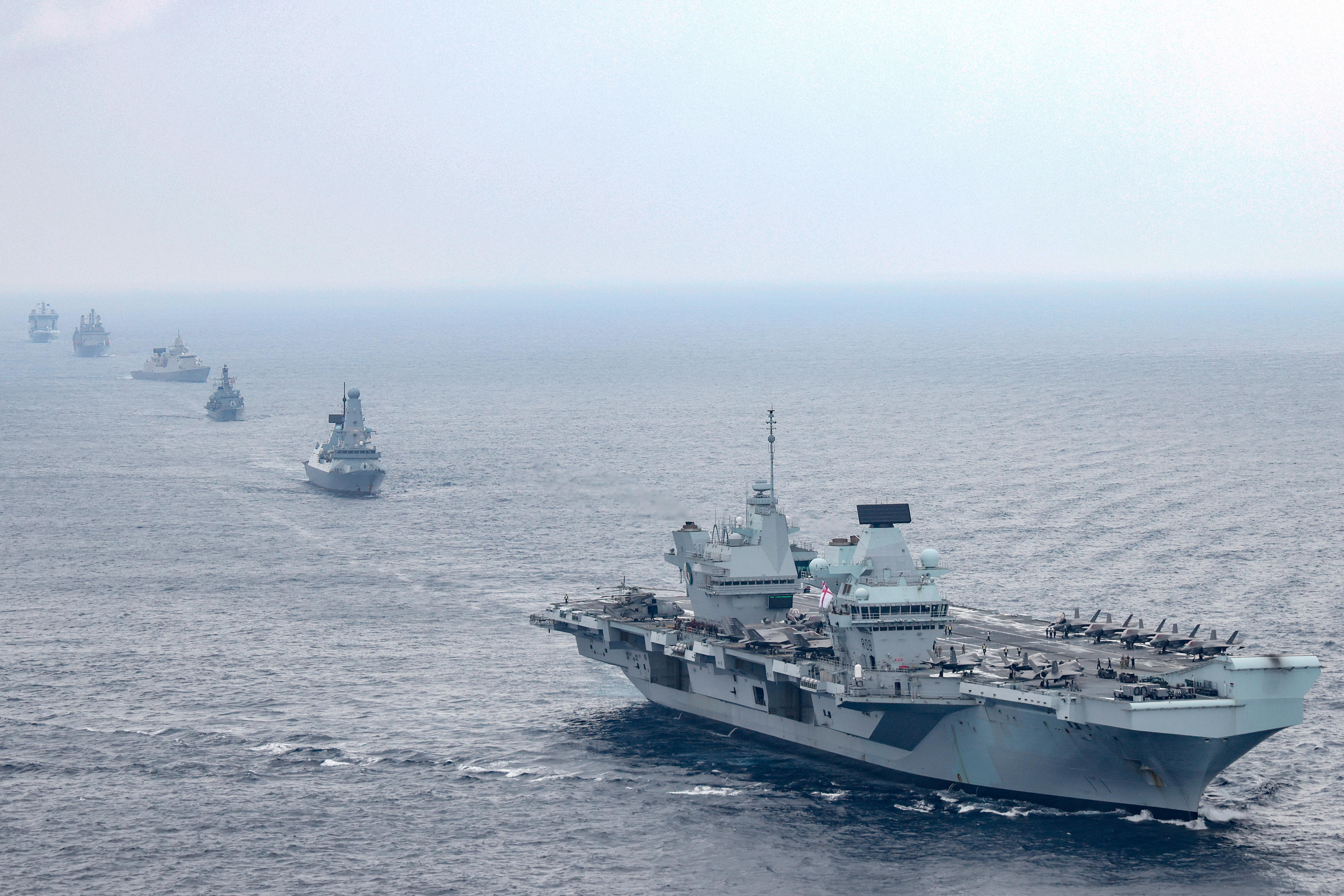
Ships of UK Carrier Strike Group 21 (October 2021)

On 22 May 2021, following a farewell visit from Queen Elizabeth II, the UK Carrier Strike Group left HMNB Portsmouth on its first operational deployment, a seven-and-a-half month roundtrip to the Pacific, visiting over 40 countries. Joining lead ship HMS Queen Elizabeth were Type 45 destroyers HMS Diamond and HMS Defender, Type 23 frigates HMS Kent and HMS Richmond, Astute-class nuclear attack submarine HMS Artful and two Royal Fleet Auxiliary supply ships, RFA Fort Victoria and RFA Tidespring. United States Navy destroyer USS The Sullivans and HNLMS Evertsen of the Royal Netherlands Navy were also assigned to the strike group. In total, approximately 3,700 sailors, aviators and marines from across the three countries were involved with the deployment. The strike group's air component amounted to over 30 aircraft, the majority of which were onboard HMS Queen Elizabeth. These included eight F-35B Lightning multirole combat aircraft from No. 617 Squadron RAF and ten from the United States Marine Corps' VMFA-211 "Wake Island Avengers". Three Merlin HM2 Crowsnest airborne surveillance and control (ASaC) aircraft were also deployed on the type's first operational deployment.

Whilst in the Mediterranean, the carrier strike group exercised with the Italian Navy and Air Force, the French aircraft carrier Charles de Gaulle and its accompanying strike group, as well as other NATO navies during Exercise Steadfast Defender. The strike group also carried out its first ever combat operations, launching F-35B Lightning multirole combat aircraft on strike sorties against Islamic State in Iraq and Syria. Whilst these missions were underway, HMS Defender and HNLMS Evertsen detached from the strike group and headed into the Black Sea to carry out Freedom of Navigation Operations (FONOPs). Whilst transiting from Odesa, Ukraine to Batumi, Georgia, HMS Defender entered the waters around Crimea, the centre of a Russian-Ukrainian sovereignty dispute, which resulted in the Russian authorities firing warning shots. Elsewhere in the Black Sea, HNLMS Evertsen also faced mock attacks by the Russian Air Force. To further monitor the strike group, Russia deployed strike bombers equipped with Kh-47M2 Kinzhal anti-ship ballistic missiles to an airbase in Syria. By 7 July 2021, both HMS Defender and HNLMS Evertsen had rejoined the strike group and it left the region via the Suez Canal. HMS Diamond was no longer part of the strike group, having suffered a defect.

In the Gulf of Aden, the carrier strike group met with two US Navy task groups, Carrier Strike Group 5 headed by USS Ronald Reagan and USS Iwo Jima's Amphibious Ready Group. The carrier strike group then exercised with the Indian Navy in the Bay of Bengal before exercising with the navies of Singapore, Malaysia and Thailand in the Strait of Malacca. Finally, in the Indo-Pacific region, the strike group exercised with the Japanese Maritime Self-Defence Force and Republic of Korea Navy.

During its return trip, the strike group exercised with the Italian Navy in the Mediterranean; HMS Queen Elizabeth set a record by hosting jets from three different nations on a single flightdeck. During its time in the Mediterranean, HMS Queen Elizabeth suffered its first loss of an F-35B when one crashed into the sea following an aborted takeoff. The pilot ejected safely but the aircraft was a complete loss and was subsequently recovered from the seabed two weeks later. The strike group returned to the UK and concluded its deployment on 9 December 2021.

The CSG21 deployment was covered by documentary filmmaker Chris Terrill in a BBC series, named The Warship: Tour of Duty. It aired on 22 January 2023.

=== Carrier Strike Group 22 (Operation Achillian) ===
Following the conclusion of CSG21, a 2022 deployment was planned with the involvement of both aircraft carriers. However, HMS Prince of Wales suffered a starboard propeller malfunction in August 2022. The deployment was subsequently downscaled as HMS Queen Elizabeth was diverted to the United States to replace Prince of Wales in hosting the Atlantic Future Forum. After returning from the US, Queen Elizabeth embarked eight F-35 jets and seven helicopters. The strike group participated in Operation Achillian with NATO forces in the North Sea to validate NATO's fifth-generation strike capability. Anti-submarine warfare exercises were also carried out alongside RAF P-8 Poseidons operating from RAF Lossiemouth in Scotland.

=== Carrier Strike Group 23 (Operation Firedrake, Exercise Standfast Defender) ===
In September 2023, HMS Queen Elizabeth sailed as the centrepiece of the CSG23 deployment, codenamed Operation Firedrake. The carrier strike group consisted of Queen Elizabeth, with a wholly British air group, alongside HMS Diamond and Norway's HNoMS Otto Sverdrup. In October, HMS Portland and later HMS Kent, joined the carrier group. The group operated in European waters alongside ships from a number of other navies, including France, Germany, the Netherlands, Belgium and Norway. Part of the deployment saw the carrier strike group operating under the direct command of NATO for the first time.

=== Carrier Strike Group 24 (Exercise Steadfast Defender) ===
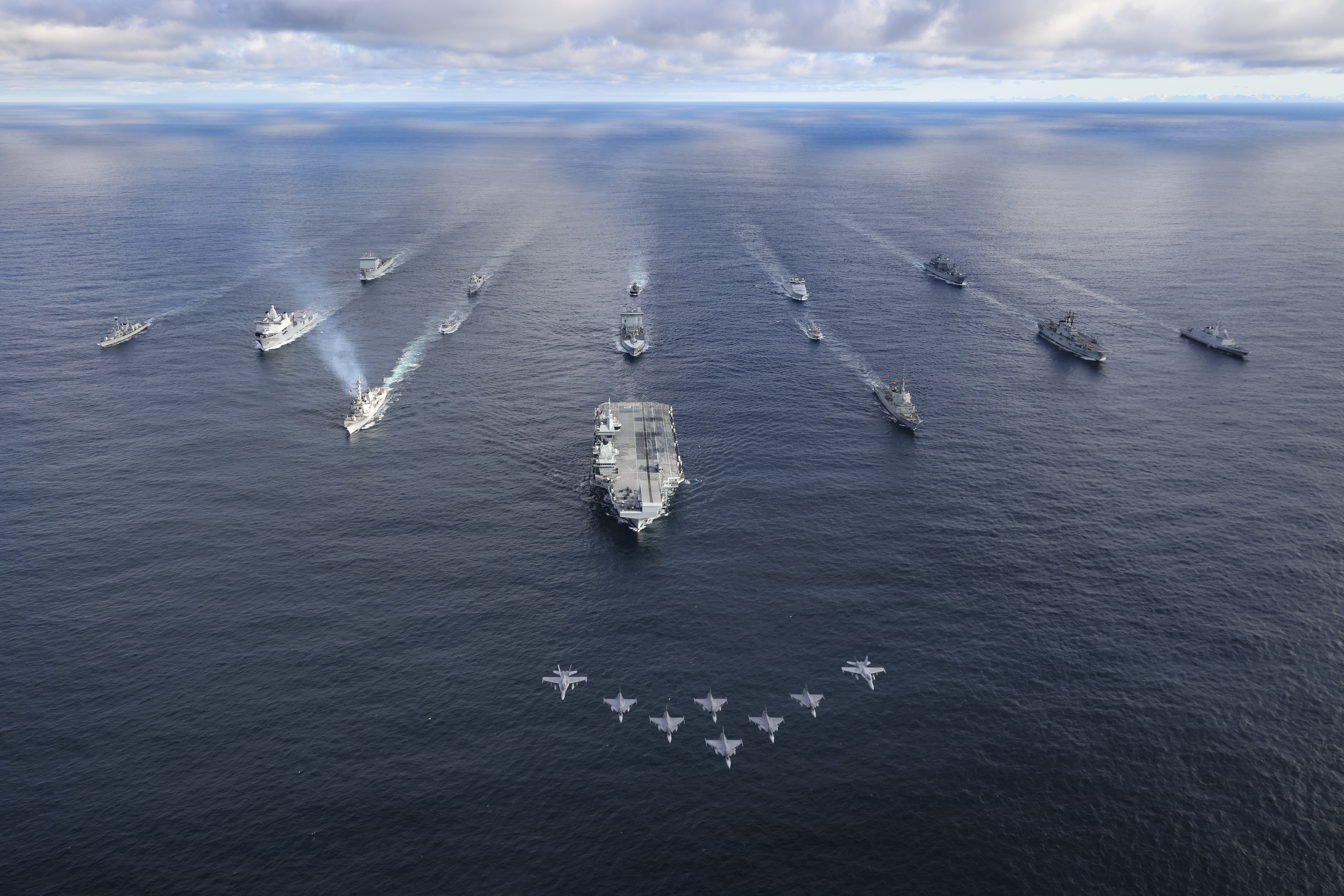
Ships of the UK Carrier Strike Group combined with the NATO Amphibious Task Group and additional Norwegian naval units during Exercise Nordic Response.

In January 2024, the UK announced its participation in Steadfast Defender 2024, the largest NATO military exercise since the end of the Cold War, involving assets from all three armed services, including the Royal Navy's Carrier Strike Group, headed by HMS Queen Elizabeth. Prior to sailing, routine checks of Queen Elizabeth revealed faults with the ship's starboard propeller shaft and so the ship was pulled from the exercise. Sister ship Prince of Wales, which was in maintenance and normally at 30 days notice to sail, was hastily readied and deployed as her replacement in just eight days. The carrier strike group comprised four British ships, namely Prince of Wales, a Type 23 frigate (initially reported as HMS Somerset but later confirmed as HMS Portland) and two Tide-class tankers. They were joined in the North Sea by the frigate HMCS Charlottetown of the Royal Canadian Navy, the destroyer Cristobal Colon of the Spanish Navy and the frigate HDMS Niels Juel of the Royal Danish Navy. As part of the UK-led Exercise Joint Warrior, the CSG operated off the Norwegian coast alongside more than 30 ships, four submarines and multiple aircraft from NATO allies. The CSG then participated in the next phase of the exercise, the Norwegian-led Exercise Nordic Response, which culminated in a 15-ship formation, led by Prince of Wales, combining the UKCSG with a NATO Amphibious Task Group. HMS Queen Elizabeth, meanwhile, underwent repairs and eventually returned to sea in July 2024.

=== Carrier Strike Group 25 (Operation Highmast) ===
In December 2023, the UK government announced it would be deploying a carrier strike group to the Pacific Ocean in 2025. These plans were reconfirmed by the newly elected Labour government in December 2024.

The deployment began on 22 April 2025, code-named Operation Highmast, with the involvement of the aircraft carrier HMS Prince of Wales, destroyer HMS Dauntless, frigate HMS Richmond (upgraded for the deployment with the Naval Strike Missile), attack submarine HMS Astute and replenishment tanker RFA Tidespring. Unlike CSG21, no dedicated solid support ships deployed with the strike group. Instead, it relied on the limited solid stores support provided by Tidespring and allied support ships, as well supplies prepositioned along the route by the RAF.

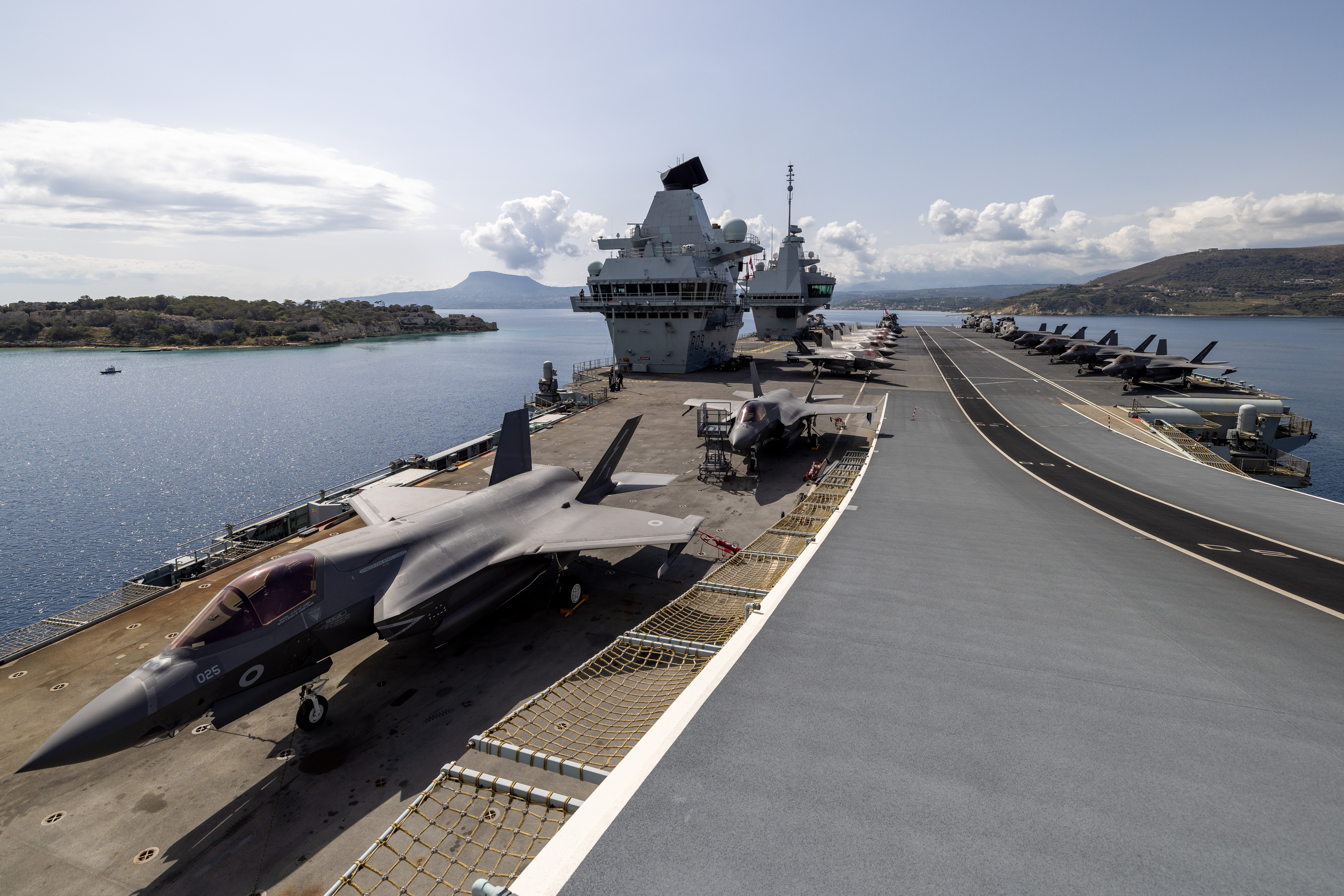
The flightdeck of HMS Prince of Wales during a visit to Souda Bay, Greece (May 2025)

The carrier strike group involved ships from foreign navies: Canada and Spain committed a frigate each (HMCS Ville de Québec and Méndez Núñez, respectively), while Norway committed a frigate and support ship (HNoMS Roald Amundsen and HNoMS Maud, respectively). Australia and New Zealand committed escorts in the Indo-Pacific, namely HMAS Sydney, HMAS Brisbane and HMNZS Te Kaha.

The carrier strike group deployed with 18 F-35B fighters, with the plan to increase that to 24 during a later part of the deployment — the largest maritime deployment of the type to date. It also deployed with a mixed fleet of 16 Wildcat HMA2 and Merlin HM2/HC4 helicopters, mostly on HMS Prince of Wales, but also deployed on other vessels. Nine of the Merlin HM2s from 820 Naval Air Squadron were specifically assigned to Prince of Wales, six in the ASW role and three in the AEW role. Three flights of UAVs are also embarked with the group, including Malloy T150 heavy lift cargo drones and Puma surveillance UAVs.

In early May, the carrier strike group reached the Mediterranean and was joined by HNoMS Roald Amundsen, HMCS Ville de Quebec and ESPC Mendez Nunez. It participated in two exercises: the large-scale NATO exercise Neptune Strike and Exercise Med Strike with the Italian carrier strike group. The exercises were supported by the Marine Services vessel SD Northern River. Russian intelligence ship Viktor Leonov shadowed the group whilst in the Western Mediterranean.

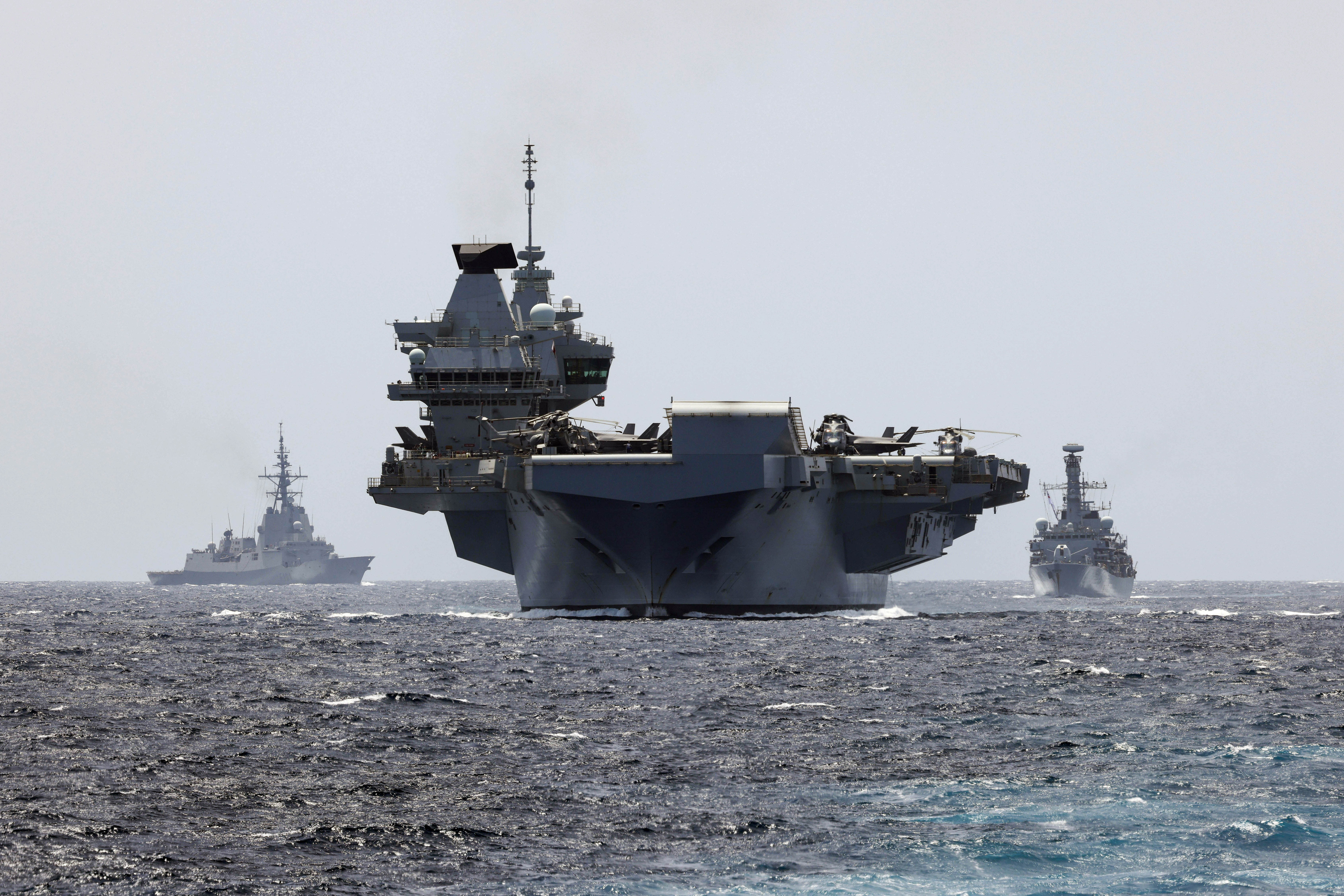
Ships of UK Carrier Strike Group 25 in the Red Sea (May 2025)

On 24 May, Maud detached from the carrier strike group after replenishing it for its onward journey through the Suez Canal into the Red Sea crisis area. Tidespring did not transit the Suez Canal and instead took the long route around South Africa en route to the Indian Ocean. The group's activities in the Red Sea, in relation to the Houthi threat, were not disclosed by the MOD.

In early June, the carrier strike group arrived in the Indian Ocean and participated in a two-day Passage Exercise (PASSEX) with the Indian Navy, including frigate INS Tabar, a submarine and a P-8I Neptune maritime patrol aircraft. The New Zealand frigate HMNZS Te Kaha also joined the group. Around the same time, it was reported that HMS Astute had returned to HMNB Devonport, raising speculation that there were no longer any Royal Navy submarines attached to the group.

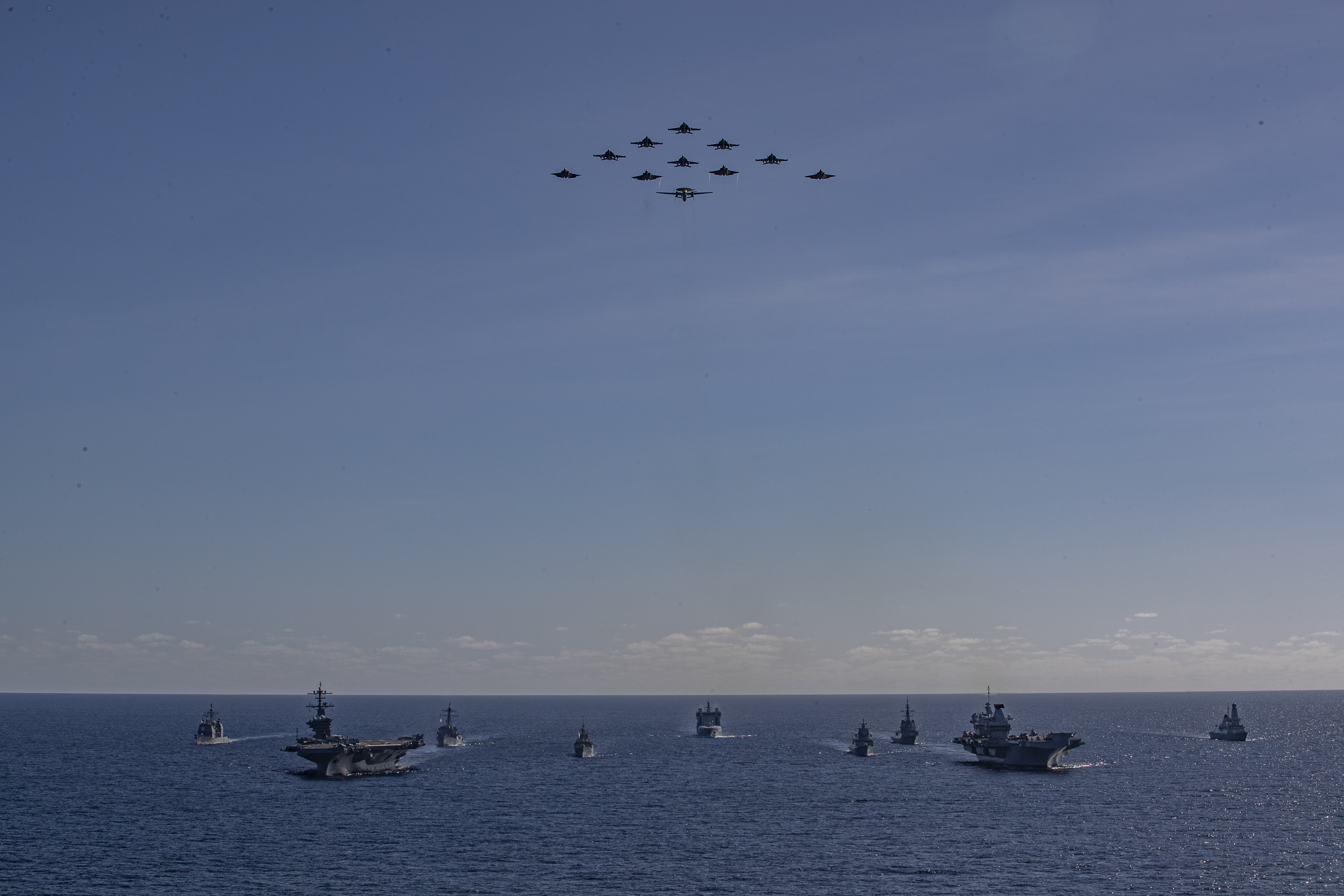
UK Carrier Strike Group 25 in formation with the USS George Washington Carrier Strike Group (July 2025)

On 14 June, one of the group's F-35Bs (tail number ZM168, aircraft number BK-034) suffered a hydraulic failure and made an emergency landing at Thiruvananthapuram International Airport in Kerala, India. The aircraft remained at the airport for more than five weeks, with engineering teams dispatched from the UK. Its length of stay was ridiculed in India, with the aircraft being featured in an advertisement from Kerala's tourism board. The rest of the carrier strike group, meanwhile, continued its journey towards Singapore. On 23 June, the aircraft carrier Prince of Wales docked in Singapore to host diplomatic engagements and events with locals, while the escorts Richmond, Roald Amundsen and Méndez Núñez visited other ports in the region. Dauntless, Tidespring and Te Kaha docked at the British Defence Singapore Support Unit, joining the Australian destroyer HMAS Sydney.

On 23 July, following an approximate 6,400 km (4,000 mi) flight from India, the repaired F-35B rejoined HMS Prince of Wales as she arrived in Australian waters after 37 days. The aircraft was also supported by an RAF Voyager (ZZ335), which provided in-flight refuelling and accompanied the jet for most of the flight, until the jet landed on the carrier just before docking in Darwin. The carrier strike group participated in Exercise Talisman Sabre with Australian, American, Japanese and Korean forces, including the American aircraft carrier USS George Washington and her carrier strike group. Prince of Wales then docked in Darwin — the first time a Royal Navy aircraft carrier had docked in Australia since HMS Illustrious in 1997. Following the completion of these exercises, the Australian and New Zealand ships detached from the group as it sailed towards Indonesia for a PASSEX with the Indonesian Navy.

In August, in the Philippine Sea, the CSG took part in a show of force with three other naval battle groups: USS George Washington's carrier strike group, USS America's Amphibious Ready Group and Japan's Kaga battle group. During this exercise, a UK F-35B landed on JS Kaga, the first landing of a British jet on a Japanese ship. On 10 August, a second F-35B made an emergency landing at a Kagoshima Airport in Kirishima, Japan. Chinese and Russian state and social media derided the repeated F-35B incident, as evidence of the UK’s declining military reliability and dependence on US technology.

In late September, the strike group participated in Exercise Bersama Lima 2025 which included the participation of member countries of the Five Power Defence Arrangements. The exercise was hosted by the Royal Malaysian Air Force at Joint Force Headquarters. Australia had deployed over 400 personnel with F-35A fighters, C-27 (35 Squadron) and HMAS Ballarat, while New Zealand was represented by over 130 personnel of HMNZS Aotearoa. Additionally, Malaysia sent its A400M and C-130H with United Kingdom's A400M and Voyager. As of 4 October, the strike group was reported to be heading towards India following the conclusion of Exercise Bersama Lima.

The strike group also took part in Exercise Konkan 2025, a bilateral and biennial maritime exercise with the Indian Navy, between 5 and 8 October 2025. The Indian Navy was represented by INS Vikrant (R11) and its Carrier Battle Group (CBG). This is the maiden instance of a dual carrier operation between the countries. While the UK CSG included Richmond and Tidespring along with HNoMS Roald Amundsen (F311) of the Royal Norwegian Navy and JS Akebono (DD-108) of the Japan Maritime Self-Defense Force, the Indian Navy's CBG included INS Kolkata (D63), INS Mormugao (D67), INS Surat (D69), INS Tabar (F44), INS Teg (F45) and INS Deepak (A50). The 2021 edition, named Konkan Shakti, was the largest exercise in the series in which all three services of both countries participated. Following the conclusion of the exercise, Richmond and Prince of Wales conduct a port call at Indira Dock, Mumbai and Goa, respectively. The visits coincided with the two-day visit of the UK Prime Minister, Keir Starmer, to India to meet the Indian Prime Minister, Narendra Modi, in Mumbai.

The exercise included an aerial exercise conducted between F-35B and Vikrant's MiG-29K fleet. This was followed by a combined submarined hunt operation which included Royal Navy Merlin Mk2 helicopters operating from Prince of Wales and Richmond and Indian Navy P-8I Neptune aircraft trying to detect an Indian submarine. On 14 October, upon departure of the CSG from India, the Indian Air Force deployed its Su-30MKI, Jaguar, AWACS and AEW&CS aircraft for a one-day exercise with the F-35B aircraft from the Prince of Wales.

Operation Highmast concluded on the 30 of November 2025 with the return of the frigate HMS Richmond to Plymouth, and the carrier HMS Prince of Wales together with destroyer HMS Dauntless and Norwegian frigate HNoMS Roald Amundsen to Portsmouth.

=== Carrier Strike Group 26 (Operation Firecrest) ===
At the Munich Security Conference on 14 February 2026, Prime Minister Keir Starmer announced the deployment of a carrier strike group to the Atlantic and High North, centred around the aircraft carrier HMS Prince of Wales. The deployment will be part of Operation Firecrest and will involve major exercises with the US, Canada and Northern European allies in the Joint Expeditionary Force.

On 7 March 2026, Prince of Wales was reportedly ordered to be at a higher state of readiness for a potential deployment to the Mediterranean and Middle East amidst the 2026 Iran War.
