= HMS Tamar (P233) =

2020 River-class offshore patrol vessel of the Royal Navy

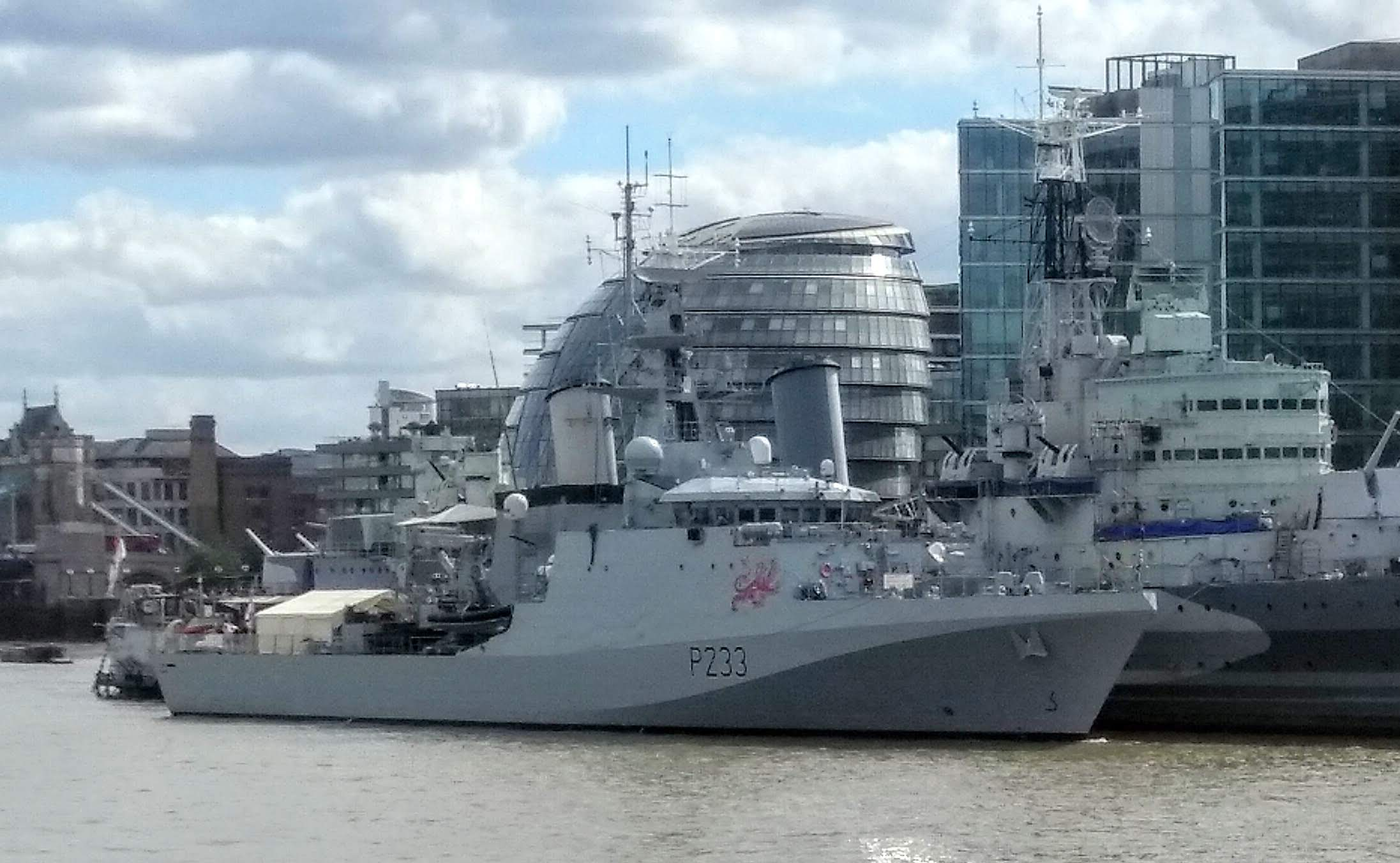
- Tamar during a visit to London in September 2020

History

United Kingdom
- Name: HMS Tamar
- Ordered: 8 December 2016
- Builder: BAE Systems Naval Ships
- Laid down: 8 December 2016 (1st steel cut)
- Launched: 10 October 2018
- Sponsored by: Brigitte Peach
- Christened: 21 March 2019
- Commissioned: 17 December 2020
- Home port: HMNB Portsmouth (forward deployed to the Indo-Pacific region, with primary logistics hub at the British Defence Singapore Support Unit in Singapore)
- Identification: Pennant number: P233
- Status: In active service
- Badge

General characteristics
- Class & type: Batch 2 River-class patrol vessel
- Displacement: 2,000 t (2,000 long tons)
- Length: 90.5 m (296 ft 11 in)
- Beam: 13 m (42 ft 8 in)
- Draught: 3.8 m (12 ft 6 in)
- Speed: 25 knots (46 km/h; 29 mph)
- Range: 5,500 nmi (10,200 km; 6,300 mi)
- Endurance: 35 days
- Boats & landing craft carried: 2 × PAC24 Mk4 Sea Boats; Unmanned underwater vehicles may be embarked for mine countermeasures
- Troops: up to 50
- Crew: 34-50
- Sensors & processing systems: Kelvin Hughes Ltd SharpEye navigation radar; Terma Scanter 4100 2D radar; BAE CMS-1; Shared Infrastructure operating system
- Armament: 1 × 30 mm DS30B gun; 2 × general purpose machine guns; 2 × miniguns (being retired as of 2023 and replaced by Browning .50 caliber heavy machine guns)
- Aircraft carried: Merlin capable flight deck; small UAVs may be embarked

HMS Tamar is a Batch 2 River-class offshore patrol vessel of the Royal Navy. Named after the River Tamar in England, she is the fourth Batch 2 River-class vessel to be built and is forward deployed long-term to the Indo-Pacific region with her sister ship HMS Spey.

== Construction ==
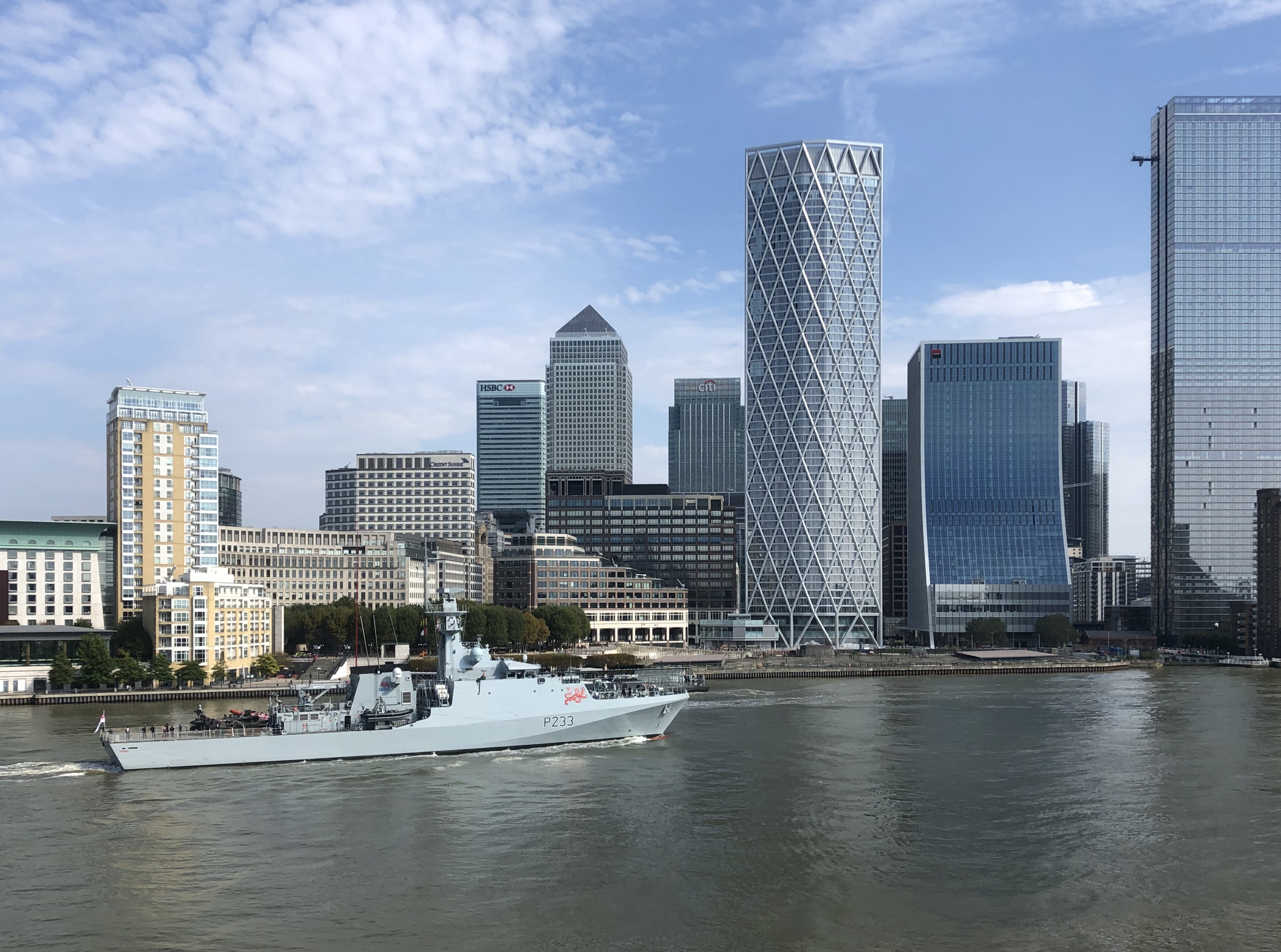
HMS Tamar passing Canary Wharf, London September 2020

On 6 November 2013 it was announced that the Royal Navy had signed an Agreement in Principle to build three new offshore patrol vessels, based on the River-class design, at a fixed price of £348 million including spares and support. In August 2014, BAE Systems signed the contract to build the ships on the Clyde. The Ministry of Defence stated that the Batch 2 ships are capable of being used for constabulary duties such as "counter-terrorism, counter-piracy and anti-smuggling operations". According to BAE Systems, the vessels are designed to deploy globally, conducting anti-piracy, counter-terrorism and anti-smuggling tasks currently conducted by frigates and destroyers. A £287m order, for two further ships, including Tamar, and support for all five Batch 2 ships, was announced on 8 December 2016.

Tamar includes some 29 modifications and enhancements over the Amazonas-class corvette built by BAE Systems for the Brazilian Navy.

Tamar was lowered into the water on 10 October 2018. The vessel began operational sea trials in late 2019. She was commissioned into service on 17 December 2020.

== Operational history ==
In April 2021, Tamar became the first Royal Navy warship to be painted in dazzle camouflage since World War II, prior to Tamar's planned deployment with HMS Spey to the Asia-Pacific region. On 6 May, Tamar was deployed to Jersey alongside Severn. This was part of a chain of events sparked by a new fishing licence scheme, introduced by the Jersey authorities post Brexit and is alleged by the French to be in contravention of an agreement between the UK and the EU nations and without consultation with the French authorities. In June, Tamar, along with Northumberland and Tyne, was deployed off the Cornish coast to provide security for the 2021 G7 summit. On 7 September, Tamar and Spey departed Portsmouth to be forward deployed to the Indo-Pacific region for a minimum of five years.

In January 2022, Tamar conducted ECC operations off the east coast of China.

In February/March 2023, Tamar operated in waters of the British Indian Ocean Territory conducting fisheries protection and other missions. Later in March, Tamar joined the French Navy's helicopter assault ship Dixmude and frigate La Fayette for exercises off Sri Lanka.

In September 2023, HMS Tamar was operating in Australian waters and in the South Pacific conducting seabed warfare exercises. For these exercises, Tamar embarked divers and autonomous underwater vehicles to conduct mine countermeasures operations and monitor critical infrastructure. The exercises highlighted the ‘plug and play’ modular design of the vessels dependent on their specific mission.

In early 2024, Tamar was deployed to the Pitcairn Islands for sovereignty protection and other duties. The ship returned to the islands for a similar mission in April 2026.

HMS Tamar went to the aid of HMNZS Manawanui when she ran aground off the south coast of Upolu island, Samoa, on 5 October 2024. Tamar travelled 650 miles at full speed, taking 23 hours to reach the area, on her arrival HMNZS Manawanui had sunk and HMS Tamar worked to protect the wreck site and recover material. Tamar was subsequently able to recover the navigation record book of HMNZS Manawanui.
