= HMS Spey (P234) =

2021 River-class offshore patrol vessel of the Royal Navy

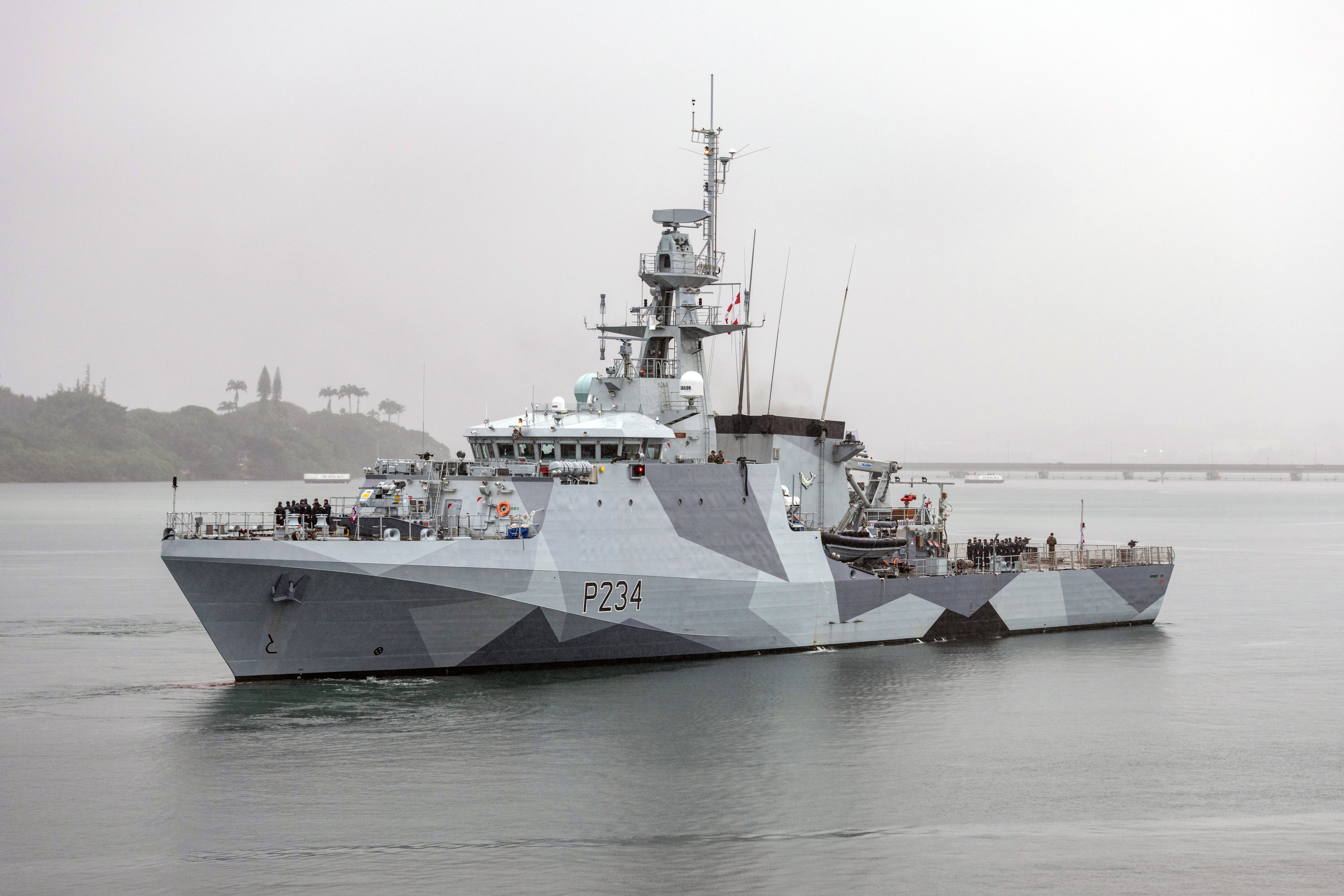
- HMS Spey in Pearl Harbor, Hawaii, December 2021

History

United Kingdom
- Name: HMS Spey
- Operator: Royal Navy
- Ordered: 8 December 2016
- Builder: BAE Systems Naval Ships
- Laid down: 21 April 2017 (1st steel cut)
- Launched: 19 June 2019
- Sponsored by: Lady Alison Johnstone
- Christened: 3 October 2019
- Commissioned: 18 June 2021
- Home port: HMNB Portsmouth (forward deployed to the Indo-Pacific region with primary logistics hub at the British Defence Singapore Support Unit in Singapore)
- Identification: Pennant number: P234
- Status: In active service
- Badge

General characteristics
- Class & type: Batch 2 River-class patrol vessel
- Displacement: 2,000 tonnes
- Length: 90.5 m (296 ft 11 in)
- Beam: 13 m (42 ft 8 in)
- Draught: 3.8 m (12 ft 6 in)
- Speed: 25 knots (46 km/h; 29 mph)
- Range: 5,500 nmi (10,200 km; 6,300 mi)
- Endurance: 35 days
- Boats & landing craft carried: Two rigid hull inflatable boats (RHIBs)
- Troops: up to 50
- Crew: 34-50
- Sensors & processing systems: Kelvin Hughes Ltd SharpEye navigation radar; Terma Scanter 4100 2D radar; BAE CMS-1; Shared Infrastructure operating system
- Armament: 1 × 30 mm DS30M gun; 2 × general purpose machine guns; 2 × miniguns (originally fit; retired as of 2023); 2 × Browning .50 caliber machine guns
- Aircraft carried: Merlin capable flight deck; small UAVs may be embarked

HMS Spey is a Batch 2 River-class offshore patrol vessel of the Royal Navy. Named after the River Spey in Scotland, she is the eighth Royal Navy ship to be named Spey and is the fifth Batch 2 River-class vessel to commission and is forward deployed long-term to the Indo-Pacific region with her sister ship HMS Tamar.

== Construction ==
On 6 November 2013 it was announced that the Royal Navy had signed an Agreement in Principle to build three new offshore patrol vessels, based on the River-class design, at a fixed price of £348 million including spares and support. In August 2014, BAE Systems signed the contract to build the ships on the Clyde. The Ministry of Defence stated that the Batch 2 ships are capable of being used for constabulary duties such as "counter-terrorism, counter-piracy and anti-smuggling operations". According to BAE Systems, the vessels are designed to deploy globally, conducting anti-piracy, counter-terrorism and anti-smuggling tasks currently conducted by frigates and destroyers. A £287m order, for two further ships, Tamar and Spey, and support for all five Batch 2 ships, was announced on 8 December 2016.

Batch 2 ships such as Spey include some 29 modifications and enhancements over the Amazonas-class corvette built by BAE Systems for the Brazilian Navy. Tamar and Spey have further modifications such as carbon dioxide reducing catalytic converters.

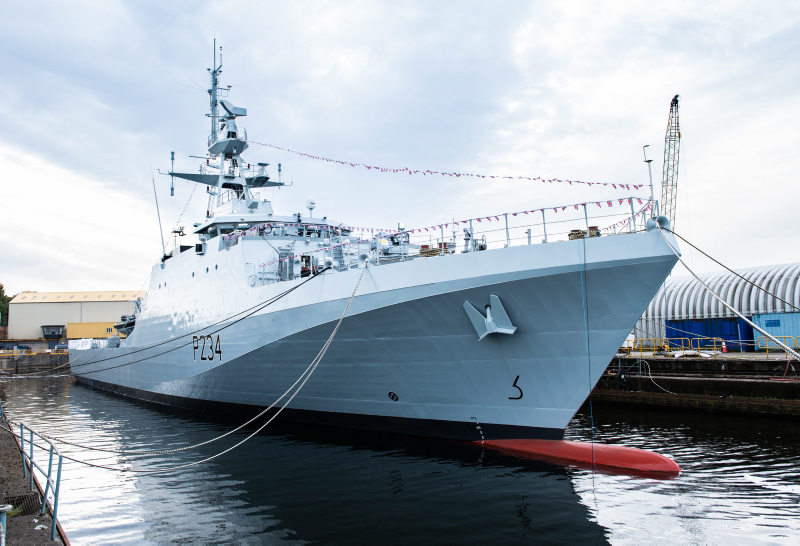
HMS Spey at the Scotstoun dock, on its naming day.

Spey was formally named on 3 October 2019. In September 2020, Spey began the contractor sea trials, and after they were completed, left the Clyde on 28 October for the delivery voyage to Portsmouth.

== Operational history ==
On 7 January 2021, HMS Spey was handed over to the Royal Navy in Portsmouth. In late spring 2021, Spey received "dazzle" camouflage in Falmouth in preparation for deploying to the Indo-Pacific region with Tamar. Spey was commissioned into the Royal Navy at her affiliated town, Invergordon on 18 June 2021. On 7 September, Spey and Tamar departed Portsmouth to be forward deployed to the Indo-Pacific region for a minimum of five years.

On 21 January 2022, Spey was deployed to Tonga as relief aid due to the 2022 Hunga Tonga–Hunga Ha'apai eruption and tsunami. In March a survey by the ship revealed that Henderson Island - part of the Pitcairn chain in the south Pacific had been mislocated in a survey in 1937 by one mile (1.6 km).

In 2023, Spey was deployed to Australia.

In 2024 HMS Spey made her inaugural visit to India following in the wake of HMS Tamar and anchored in Port Blair, a strategic port in the Andaman and Nicobar Island groups following exercises conducted with Indian Navy Patrol boats. In April, the ship embarked a Puma unmanned air vehicle team from 700 Naval Air Squadron for operations in the East China Sea. In June 2025, HMS Spey transited the Taiwan strait.

During one of her maintenance periods in Singapore, the ship was fitted with the new advanced Helicopter Visual Landing Aid System (HVLAS) to enhance her aviation capabilities.
