= Peter Hall (director) =

English theatre, opera and film director (1930–2017)

Sir Peter Hall CBE
- Hall at the South Bank Sky Arts Awards, 2011
- Born: Peter Reginald Frederick Hall; 22 November 1930; Bury St Edmunds, England
- Died: 11 September 2017 (aged 86); London, England
- Education: St Catharine's College, Cambridge (BA)
- Years active: 1953–2011
- Spouses: Leslie Caron (m. 1956; div. 1965); Jacqueline Taylor (m. 1965; div. 1981); Maria Ewing (m. 1982; div. 1990); Nicki Frei (m. 1990)
- Children: 6, including Christopher, Jennifer, Edward and Rebecca

Sir Peter Reginald Frederick Hall (22 November 1930 – 11 September 2017) was an English theatre, opera and film director. His obituary in The Times described him as "the most important figure in British theatre for half a century" and on his death, a Royal National Theatre statement declared that Hall's "influence on the artistic life of Britain in the 20th century was unparalleled". In 2018, the Laurence Olivier Awards, recognising achievements in London theatre, changed the award for Best Director to the Sir Peter Hall Award for Best Director.

In 1955, Hall introduced London audiences to the work of Samuel Beckett with the UK premiere of Waiting for Godot. Hall founded the Royal Shakespeare Company and was its director from 1960 to 1968. He went on to build an international reputation in theatre, opera, film and television. He was director of the National Theatre (1973–88) and artistic director of Glyndebourne Festival Opera (1984–1990). He formed the Peter Hall Company (1998–2011) and became founding director of the Rose Theatre Kingston in 2003. Throughout his career, he was a tenacious champion of public funding for the arts.

== Life and career ==
=== Early years and education ===
Peter Reginald Frederick Hall was born in Bury St Edmunds, Suffolk, the only son of Grace Florence (née Pamment) and Reginald Edward Arthur Hall. His father was a stationmaster and the family lived for some time at Shelford railway station. He won a scholarship to The Perse School in Cambridge. Before taking up a further scholarship to read English at St Catharine's College, Cambridge, Hall did his National Service in Germany at the RAF Headquarters for Education in Bückeburg.

Whilst studying at Cambridge he produced and acted in a number of plays, directing five in his final year and a further three for The Marlowe Society Summer Festival. He served on the Cambridge University Amateur Dramatic Club (CUADC) committee before graduating in 1953. In the same year, Hall staged his first professional play, The Letter by W. Somerset Maugham, at The Theatre Royal Windsor. In 1954 and 1955, Hall was the director of the Oxford Playhouse, where he directed several later prominent young actors including Ronnie Barker and Billie Whitelaw. Eileen Atkins and Maggie Smith were also part of the company as acting Assistants Stage Managers.

=== Career ===
From 1955 to 1957, Hall ran the Arts Theatre in London, where he directed the English-language premiere of Waiting for Godot in 1955. The production's success transformed his career overnight and attracted the attention of, among others, Tennessee Williams, for whom he would direct the London premieres of Camino Real (1957) and Cat on a Hot Tin Roof (1958), and Harold Pinter. Other productions at The Arts included the English language premiere of The Waltz of the Toreadors by Jean Anouilh.

=== Royal Shakespeare Company ===
Hall made his debut at the Shakespeare Memorial Theatre in Stratford-upon-Avon in 1956 with Love's Labour's Lost: his productions there in the 1957–1959 seasons included Cymbeline with Peggy Ashcroft as Imogen, Coriolanus with Laurence Olivier, and A Midsummer Night's Dream with Charles Laughton. In 1960, aged 29, Hall succeeded Glen Byam Shaw as director of the theatre, and expanded operations to be all-year. He founded the Royal Shakespeare Company (RSC) to realise his vision of a resident ensemble of actors, directors and designers producing both modern and classic texts, with a distinctive house style. The company played in Stratford and expanded into the Aldwych Theatre, its first London home.

Hall's many productions for the RSC included Hamlet (1965, with David Warner), The Government Inspector (1966, with Paul Scofield), the world premiere of Harold Pinter's The Homecoming (1965), and The Wars of the Roses (1963), adapted with John Barton from Shakespeare's history plays. The latter was described as "the greatest Shakespearian event in living memory which also laid down the doctrine of Shakespearian relevance to the modern world". Hall left the RSC in 1968 after almost ten years as its director.

=== At the National Theatre ===
Hall was appointed director of the National Theatre (NT) in 1973 and led the organisation for fifteen years until 1988. He supervised the move from the Old Vic to the new purpose-built complex on London's South Bank "in the face of wide-spread scepticism and violent union unrest, turning a potential catastrophe into the great success story it remains today." Frustrated by construction delays, Hall decided to move the company into the still-unfinished building and to open it theatre by theatre as each neared completion. Extracts from his production of Tamburlaine the Great with Albert Finney were performed out on the terraces, free to passers-by.

Hall directed thirty-three productions for the NT including the world premieres of Harold Pinter's No Man's Land (1975, with John Gielgud and Ralph Richardson) and Betrayal (1978), Peter Shaffer's Amadeus (1979, with Paul Scofield and Simon Callow), and the London and Broadway premieres of Alan Ayckbourn's Bedroom Farce. Other landmark productions included The Oresteia (in a version by Tony Harrison with music by Harrison Birtwistle, 1981) which became the first Greek play to be performed by a foreign company at the ancient theatre of Epidaurus, Animal Farm (in his own adaptation, 1984) and Antony and Cleopatra with Judi Dench and Anthony Hopkins (1987).

Hall returned to the NT for the last time in 2011 with a production of Twelfth Night mounted by the company to celebrate his eightieth birthday. His daughter, Rebecca Hall, played Viola alongside Simon Callow as Sir Toby Belch in the Cottesloe Theatre.

=== Later theatre career ===
Upon leaving the NT in 1988, Hall launched his own commercial company with productions in the West End and on Broadway of Tennessee Williams' Orpheus Descending (with Vanessa Redgrave) and The Merchant of Venice (with Dustin Hoffman). The Peter Hall Company went on to stage more than sixty plays in association with a number of producing partners including Bill Kenwright and Thelma Holt. In addition to an ensemble repertory season at the Old Vic (1997), the company enjoyed a long collaboration with the Theatre Royal, Bath where a series of summer festivals were staged from 2003–2011: many productions were subsequently performed on domestic and international tours and in the West End. The plays produced included Oscar Wilde's An Ideal Husband (1992), Pam Gems' Piaf (with Elaine Paige, 1993), Hamlet (with Stephen Dillane, 1994), Henrik Ibsen's The Master Builder (with Alan Bates, 1995), A Streetcar Named Desire (with Jessica Lange, 1996), Julian Barry's Lenny (with Eddie Izzard, 1999), As You Like It (with Rebecca Hall and Dan Stevens, 2003), Brian Clark's Whose Life is it Anyway? (with Kim Cattrall, 2005), the fiftieth anniversary production of Waiting for Godot, Coward's Hay Fever (with Judi Dench, 2006) and Shaw's Pygmalion (with Tim Pigott-Smith and Michelle Dockery, 2007). Hall's final productions for his company were Henry IV, Part 1 and Part 2 (2011), staged at the Theatre Royal Bath.

Hall directed extensively in the United States including the world premiere of John Guare's Four Baboons Adoring the Sun (Lincoln Center, 1992), three Shakespeare plays with Center Theater Group, Los Angeles (1999 and 2001) and John Barton's nine-hour epic Tantalus (2000), an RSC co-production with the Denver Center for the Performing Arts.

In 2003, Hall became the founding director of The Rose Theatre – a new venue to be constructed in Kingston upon Thames whose design was inspired by the Elizabethan original. He directed a number of productions there including Chekhov's Uncle Vanya, which opened the building in 2008, and A Midsummer Night's Dream (with Judi Dench as Titania, 2010). Hall was also appointed "Director Emeritus" of The Rose Kingston.

=== Opera ===
Peter Hall was also an internationally celebrated opera director. His first experience was in 1957, directing The Moon and Sixpence by John Gardner at Sadler's Wells. He was able to play the piano well enough to read opera scores. His first major project was Schoenberg's Moses und Aron at Covent Garden, which led on to further productions at that house. Hall worked at many of the world's leading houses as well as Royal Opera House, including the Metropolitan Opera in New York, Houston Grand Opera, Los Angeles Opera, Lyric Opera of Chicago and the Bayreuth Festival where he, with conductor Georg Solti, directed Wagner's Ring Cycle (Der Ring des Nibelungen) in 1983 to honour the centenary of the composer's death. The production was played until 1986. Hall staged the world premieres of Michael Tippett's The Knot Garden (1970) and New Year (1989). He had a close relationship with the Glyndebourne Festival where he was artistic director from 1984 to 1990, directing more than twenty productions including the Mozart/Da Ponte operas. His production of Benjamin Britten's A Midsummer Night's Dream (1981) was revived many times, most recently 44 years after its premiere, in Autumn 2025. Hall also directed Albert Herring by Benjamin Britten, Cavalli's La Calisto, Monteverdi's Il ritorno d'Ulisse in patria and Gluck's Orfeo ed Euridice (all with Janet Baker); L'incoronazione di Poppea and Carmen – both with his then wife, Maria Ewing, with whom he also staged a celebrated Salome (The Royal Opera London and L.A. Opera) in 1986. Opera magazine noted Hall's characteristics as (in relation to La Cenerentola at Glyndebourne) "dignity and emotional veracity", recalling that "he would always insist that 'the singers, like actors, played off each other'".

=== Film and TV ===
Hall's films for cinema and TV include Akenfield (1974), a fictionalisation based on Ronald Blythe's oral history and filmed in Blythe's native Suffolk with a cast of local people. It was restored and relaunched in 2016 by the BFI. Hall's film She's Been Away was written by Stephen Poliakoff and starred Peggy Ashcroft and Geraldine James who both won awards for their performances at the Venice Film Festival. Hall also directed The Camomile Lawn and The Final Passage for Channel 4 television, as well as a number of his opera and stage productions. His only American studio movie, the 1995 erotic thriller Never Talk to Strangers, "proved to me that I have no aptitude whatever for surviving the Hollywood rat race," as Hall wrote in the updated edition of his memoir Making an Exhibition of Myself. For several years during the 1970s he presented the arts programme Aquarius for London Weekend Television. In 2005 he was the subject of a two-hour documentary for The South Bank Show, Peter Hall, Fifty Years in Theatre.

=== Acting ===
Hall began acting as a student at Cambridge University, where Dadie Rylands taught him to speak Shakespearean verse. He was also influenced in his understanding of Shakespeare by the literary critic and teacher F. R. Leavis. He subsequently acted in three German films in the 1970s: Der Fußgänger (The Pedestrian, directed by Maximilian Schell, 1973), Als Mutter streikte (When Mother Went on Strike, 1974) and Der letzte Schrei (The Last Word, 1974).

=== Writing ===
His books on theatre include The Necessary Theatre (Nick Hern, 1999), Exposed by the Mask (Oberon, 2000) and Shakespeare's Advice to the Players (Oberon, 2003). The Peter Hall Diaries – the Story of a Dramatic Battle, edited by John Goodwin (Hamish Hamilton) were first published in 1983 and documented his struggle to establish the National Theatre on the South Bank. His autobiography, Making an Exhibition of Myself (Sinclair-Stevenson), was published in 1993.

=== Personal life ===
Hall was married four times. He had six children and nine grandchildren. His first wife was French actress Leslie Caron, with whom he had a son, Christopher, and a daughter, Jennifer. With his second wife, Jacqueline Taylor, he had a son, Edward, and a daughter. Hall married American opera singer Maria Ewing in 1982, with whom he had one daughter, Rebecca. He was lastly married to Nicki Frei; the couple had one daughter, Emma.

Hall worked with all his children: for the National Theatre, Jennifer played Miranda in The Tempest (1988); Rebecca, aged nine, played young Sophie in the Channel 4 adaptation of The Camomile Lawn, for The Peter Hall Company she played Vivie in Mrs Warren's Profession (2002), Rosalind in As You Like It (2003), Maria in Gallileo's Daughter (2004) and, for the NT, Viola in Twelfth Night (2011); Emma, aged two, played Joseph in Jacob (2004, TV Movie); for the Peter Hall Company, Lucy designed Hamlet (1994), Cuckoos (2003) and Whose Life is it Anyway? (2005); Christopher produced the Channel 4 television drama The Final Passage (1996); Edward co-directed the stage epic Tantalus (2000).

Hall was diagnosed with dementia in 2011 and retired from public life.

Hall was described by Guardian contributor Mark Lawson as a "committed atheist, from as early as his 20s", leading "to a punishing work rate in his hurry to get everything done".

=== Death and legacy ===
On 11 September 2017, Hall died from pneumonia at University College Hospital, London, surrounded by family. He was 86 years old.

His obituary in The Times declared him "the most important figure in British theatre for half a century" and a Royal National Theatre statement declared that Hall's "influence on the artistic life of Britain in the 20th century was unparalleled".

Many luminaries of British theatre paid tribute to Hall. Nicholas Hytner said: "Without him there would have been no Royal Shakespeare Company." Trevor Nunn said: "Not only a thrilling director, he was the great impresario of the age." Richard Eyre called Hall the "godfather" of British theatre: "Peter created the template of the modern director – part-magus, part-impresario, part-politician, part celebrity." Impresario Cameron Mackintosh said: "It's thanks to Peter Hall that people like Trevor Nunn, Nicholas Hytner and Sam Mendes transformed musical theatre around the world." Theatre critic Michael Coveney said that he believed Hall's production of The Wars of the Roses "recast the [Shakespeare] history plays and put them at the centre of our culture".

Peter Brook said: "Peter was a man for all seasons – he could play any part that was needed". Elaine Paige said: "Peter Hall had absolute authority and, as a heavyweight of the theatre, real presence." Griff Rhys Jones said: "Peter was an absolute smoothie, the most charming and diplomatic man" and Samuel West said "Peter was an extraordinarily energetic, imaginative director – if you left him in the corner of a room he'd direct a play – but he was also a great campaigner. He never stopped arguing for the role of subsidised art in a civilised society and its ability to change people's lives."

In April 2018, the Society of London Theatre, which presents the annual Laurence Olivier Awards recognizing achievements in London theatre, changed the award for Best Director to the Sir Peter Hall Award for Best Director.

In 2018, The Perse School in Cambridge – which Hall attended from 1941 to 1949 – opened the Peter Hall Performing Arts Centre in his honour. Designed by Haworth Tompkins, the £9 million building is a 400-seat theatre and teaching space with a triple-height glazed foyer and a timber diagrid roof. It is used for the school's live performances, showcases and staged musicals, and has been described as a professional-standard theatre named after the founder of the Royal Shakespeare Company and old Persean, Sir Peter Hall. The building was designed with sustainability in mind: its roof holds a 13.72 kWp array of 49 solar panels, installed in 2017, generating around 12,334 kWh per year, while two ground source heat pumps supply the PAC's heating, generating an expected 168,000 kWh annually.

== Selected works ==
=== Stage productions ===
Hall published a complete list of his productions in his autobiography:

- The Letter (W. Somerset Maugham, Theatre Royal Windsor) 1953
- Blood Wedding (Lorca, London debut, Arts Theatre) 1954
- The Impresario from Smyrna (Goldoni, Arts Theatre) 1954
- The Immoralist (Gide, Arts Theatre) 1954
- Listen to the Wind (Angela Jeans, music by Vivian Ellis, Arts Theatre) 1954
- The Lesson (Ionesco, Arts Theatre) 1955
- South (Julian Green, Arts Theatre) 1955
- Mourning Becomes Electra (O'Neill, Arts Theatre) 1955
- Waiting for Godot (Beckett, English-language world premiere, Arts Theatre) 1955
- The Burnt Flower-Bed (Ugo Betti, Arts Theatre) 1955
- Summertime (Ugo Betti, Arts Theatre) 1955
- The Waltz of the Toreadors (Jean Anouilh, English-language premiere, Arts Theatre) 1956
- Gigi (Colette, New Theatre) 1956
- Love's Labours Lost (Shakespeare, Stratford-on-Avon) 1956
- The Gates of Summer (John Whiting, New Theatre Oxford) 1956
- Camino Real (Tennessee Williams, Phoenix Theatre, London) 1957
- The Moon and Sixpence (John Gardner, opera debut, Sadlers Wells) 1957
- Cymbeline (Shakespeare, Stratford-on-Avon) 1957
- The Rope Dancers (Morton Wishengard, New York debut, Cort Theatre) 1957
- Cat on a Hot Tin Roof (Tennessee Williams, Comedy Theatre) 1958
- Twelfth Night (Shakespeare, Stratford-on-Avon) 1958
- Brouhaha (George Tabori, Aldwych) 1958
- Shadow of Heroes (Robert Ardrey, Piccadilly Theatre) 1958
- Madame de… (Anouilh, Arts Theatre) 1959
- Traveller Without Luggage (Anouilh, Arts Theatre) 1959
- A Midsummer Night's Dream (Shakespeare, Stratford-on-Avon) 1959
- Coriolanus (Shakespeare, Stratford-on-Avon) 1959
- The Wrong Side of the Park (John Mortimer, Cambridge Theatre) 1959
- The Two Gentlemen of Verona (Shakespeare, Royal Shakespeare Company) 1960
- Twelfth Night (Shakespeare, RSC) 1960
- Troilus and Cressida (Shakespeare, RSC) 1960
- Ondine (Giraudoux, RSC, Aldwych) 1961
- Becket (Anouilh, RSC, Aldwych) 1961
- Romeo and Juliet (Shakespeare, RSC) 1961
- A Midsummer Night's Dream (Shakespeare, RSC) 1962
- The Collection (Pinter, RSC) 1962
- Troilus and Cressida (Shakespeare, RSC) 1962
- The Wars of the Roses (adapted with John Barton from Shakespeare's Henry VI Parts 1, 2 and 3 and Richard III, RSC) 1963
- Edward IV (Shakespeare, RSC) 1963
- Richard II (Shakespeare, RSC) 1964
- Henry IV Parts 1 and 2 (Shakespeare, RSC) 1964
- Henry V (Shakespeare, RSC) 1964
- Eh? (Henry Livings, RSC, Aldwych) 1964
- The Homecoming (Pinter, world premiere, RSC) 1965
- Moses and Aaron (Schoenberg, UK premiere, Royal Opera House) 1965
- Hamlet (Shakespeare, RSC) 1965
- The Government Inspector (Gogol, RSC, Aldwych) 1966
- The Magic Flute (Mozart, Royal Opera House) 1966
- Staircase (Charles Wood, RSC, Aldwych) 1966
- Macbeth (Shakespeare, RSC) 1967
- A Delicate Balance (Edward Albee, RSC, Aldwych) 1969
- Dutch Uncle (Simon Gray, RSC, Aldwych) 1969
- Landscape and Silence (Pinter, world premieres, RSC, Aldwych) 1969
- The Knot Garden (Tippett, world premiere, Royal Opera House) 1970
- La Calisto (Cavalli, Glyndebourne debut, Glyndebourne Festival Opera) 1970
- The Battle of Shrivings (Shaffer, Lyric Theatre) 1970
- Eugene Onegin (Tchaikovsky, Royal Opera House) 1971
- Old Times (Harold Pinter, world premiere, RSC Aldwych) 1971
- Tristan und Isolde (Wagner, Royal Opera House) 1971
- All Over (Edward Albee, RSC, Aldwych) 1972
- Il Ritorno d'Ulisse (Monteverdi, Glyndebourne Festival Opera) 1972
- Via Galactica (lyrics by Christopher Gore, music by Galt MacDermot, New York) 1972
- Le Nozze di Figaro (Mozart, Glyndebourne Festival Opera) 1973
- The Tempest (Shakespeare, National Theatre) 1973
- John Gabriel Borkman (Ibsen, NT) 1974
- Happy Days (Beckett, NT) 1974
- No Man's Land (Pinter, world premiere, NT) 1975
- Hamlet (Shakespeare, official opening of the Lyttelton, NT) 1975
- Judgement (Barry Collins, NT) 1975
- Tamburlaine the Great (Christopher Marlowe, official opening of the Olivier, NT) 1976
- Bedroom Farce (Ayckbourn, also co-director, London and US premieres, NT and Broadway) 1977
- Don Giovanni (Mozart, Glyndebourne Festival Opera) 1977
- Volpone (Ben Jonson, NT) 1977
- The Country Wife (Wycherley, NT) 1977
- Così fan tutte (Mozart, Glyndebourne Festival Opera) 1978
- The Cherry Orchard (Chekhov, NT) 1978
- Macbeth (Shakespeare, NT) 1978
- Betrayal (Pinter, world premiere, NT) 1978
- Fidelio (Beethoven, Glyndebourne Festival Opera) 1979
- Amadeus (Peter Shaffer, world premiere, NT) 1979
- Othello (Shakespeare, NT) 1980
- A Midsummer Night's Dream (Britten, Glyndebourne Festival Opera) 1981
- The Oresteia (Aeschylus, trans. Harrison, NT and Epidaurus) 1981
- Orfeo ed Euridice (Gluck, Glyndebourne Festival Opera) 1982
- The Importance of Being Earnest (Wilde, NT) 1982
- Macbeth (Verdi, Metropolitan Opera, New York) 1982
- Other Places (Pinter, world premiere, NT) 1982
- Der Ring des Nibelungen (Wagner, Bayreuth Festival Opera) 1983
- Jean Seberg (lyrics by Christopher Adler, book by Julian Barry, music by Marvin Hamlisch, NT) 1983
- Animal Farm (George Orwell, adapted by Hall, NT) 1984
- Coriolanus (Shakespeare, NT and Athens) 1984
- L'incoronazione di Poppea (Monteverdi, Glyndebourne Festival Opera) 1984
- Yonadab (Shaffer, world premiere, NT) 1985
- Carmen (Bizet, Glyndebourne) 1985
- Albert Herring (Britten, Glyndebourne) 1985
- The Petition (Brian Clark, NT) 1986
- Simon Boccanegra (Verdi, Glyndebourne) 1986
- Salome (Strauss, LA Opera) 1986
- Coming in to Land (Poliakoff, world premiere, NT) 1986
- Antony and Cleopatra (Shakespeare, NT) 1987
- La traviata (Verdi, Glyndebourne) 1987
- Entertaining Strangers (David Edgar, NT) 1987
- Cymbeline (Shakespeare, NT, Moscow and Epidaurus) 1988
- The Winter's Tale (Shakespeare, NT, Moscow and Epidaurus) 1988
- The Tempest (Shakespeare, NT, Moscow and Epidaurus) 1988
- Falstaff (Verdi, Glyndebourne) 1988
- Orpheus Descending (Tennessee Williams, Peter Hall Company, Haymarket and Broadway) 1988/9
- The Merchant of Venice (Shakespeare, PHCo, Phoenix Theatre and Broadway) 1989/90
- New Year (Tippett, world premiere, Houston Opera) 1989
- Le Nozze di Figaro (Mozart, Glyndebourne) 1989
- The Wild Duck (Ibsen, trans. Hall/Ewbank, PHCo, Phoenix Theatre) 1990
- Born Again (after Ionesco's Rhinoceros, lyrics by Julian Barry, music by Jason Carr, PHCo/Chichester Festival Theatre) 1990
- The Homecoming (Pinter, PHCo Comedy Theatre) 1990
- Twelfth Night (Shakespeare, PHCo, Playhouse Theatre) 1991
- Tartuffe (Moliere, trans. Bolt, PHCo, Playhouse Theatre) 1991
- The Rose Tattoo (Tennessee Williams, PHCo, Playhouse Theatre) 1991
- Four Baboons Adoring the Sun (John Guare, world premiere, Lincoln Center) 1992
- Sienna Red (Poliakoff, PHCo, Liverpool Playhouse) 1992
- All's Well That Ends Well (Shakespeare, RSC, Swan) 1992
- The Gift of the Gorgon (Shaffer, world premiere, RSC, Barbican and Wyndham's Theatre) 1992
- An Ideal Husband (Wilde, PHCo/Bill Kenwright Ltd, Globe Theatre and Broadway) 1992
- The Magic Flute (Mozart, LA Opera) 1993
- Separate Tables (Rattigan, PHCo/BKL, Albery Theatre) 1993
- Lysistrata (Aristophanes, trans. Bolt, PHCo/BKL, Old Vic, Wyndham's and Epidaurus) 1993
- She Stoops to Conquer (Goldsmith, PHCo/BKL, Queen's Theatre) 1993
- Piaf (Pam Gems, PHCo/BKL, Piccadilly Theatre) 1993
- An Absolute Turkey (Feydeau, trans. Hall/Frei, PHCo/BKL, Thorndike Theatre) 1993
- On Approval (Lonsdale, PHCo/BKL, Playhouse Theatre) 1994
- Hamlet (Shakespeare, PHCo/BKL, Gielgud Theatre) 1994
- The Master Builder (Ibsen, trans. Hall/Ewbank, PHCo/BKL, Haymarket) 1995
- Julius Caesar (Shakespeare, RSC) 1995
- Mind Millie for Me (Feydeau, trans. Hall/Frei, PHCo/BKL, Haymarket) 1996
- The Oedipus Plays (Sophocles, trans. Bolt, NT, Athens and Epidaurus) 1996
- The School for Wives (Moliere, trans. Bolt, PHCo/BKL, Picadilly Theatre) 1996
- A Streetcar Named Desire (Tennessee Williams, PHCo/BKL, Haymarket) 1996
- Waste (Granville Barker, PHCo, Old Vic) 1997
- The Seagull (Chekhov, trans. Stoppard, PHCo, Old Vic) 1997
- Waiting for Godot (Beckett, PHCo, Old Vic) 1997
- King Lear (Shakespeare, PHCo, Old Vic) 1997
- Just the Three of Us (Simon Gray, PHCo/BKL, Theatre Royal, Windsor)
- The Misanthrope (Moliere, trans. Bolt, PHCo/BKL, Piccadilly Theatre) 1998
- Major Barbara (George Bernard Shaw, PHCo/BKL, Piccadilly) 1998
- Filumena (de Fillipo, PHCo/BKL, Piccadilly) 1998
- Amadeus (Shaffer, PHCo, Old Vic and Broadway) 1998/9
- Kafka's Dick (Alan Bennett, PHCo/BKL Piccadilly) 1998
- Measure for Measure (Shakespeare, Center Theater Group, Los Angeles) 1999
- A Midsummer Night's Dream (Shakespeare, Center Theater Group, LA) 1999
- Lenny (Julian Barry, PHCo, Queen's Theatre) 1999
- Cuckoos (Manfredi, trans. Teevan, PHCo, Gate Theatre) 2000
- Tantalus (John Barton, world premiere, RSC/Denver Center for the Performing Arts, Denver, UK tour and Barbican) 2000/1
- Romeo and Juliet (Shakespeare, Center Theater Group, LA) 2001
- Japes (Simon Gray, world premiere, PHCo, Haymarket) 2001
- Troilus and Cressida (Shakespeare, Theatre for a New Audience, off-Broadway) 2001
- Otello (Verdi, Glyndebourne and Lyric Opera, Chicago) 2001
- The Royal Family (Ferber, PHCo, Haymarket) 2001
- Lady Windermere's Fan (Wilde, PHCo, Haymarket) 2002
- The Bacchai (Euripides, trans. Teevan, NT and Epidaurus) 2002
- Albert Herring (Britten, Glyndebourne) 2002
- Mrs. Warren's Profession (Shaw, PHCo, Strand Theatre) 2002
- Where There's a Will (Feydeau, trans. Frei, PHCo/Theatre Royal Bath) 2003
- Betrayal (Pinter, PHCo/Theatre Royal Bath, UK tour and West End) 2003
- Design for Living (Coward, PHCo/Theatre Royal Bath and UK tour) 2003
- As You Like It (Shakespeare, PHCo/Theatre Royal Bath, UK and US tour) 2003/4
- Le Nozze di Figaro (Mozart, Lyric Opera Chicago) 2003
- Happy Days (Beckett, PHCo/Theatre Royal Bath and Arts Theatre) 2003
- Man and Superman (Shaw, PHCo/Theatre Royal Bath) 2004
- Gallileo's Daughter (Timberlake Wertenbaker, world premiere, PHCo/Theatre Royal Bath) 2004
- The Dresser (Harwood, PHCo/Theatre Royal Bath, UK tour and West End) 2004
- Whose Life is it Anyway? (Brian Clark, PHCo/Sonia Friedman Productions, Duke of York's) 2005
- La Cenerentola (Rossini, Glyndebourne) 2005
- Much Ado About Nothing (Shakespeare, PHCo/Theatre Royal Bath) 2005
- You Never Can Tell (Shaw, PHCo/Theatre Royal Bath and West End) 2005
- Waiting for Godot (Beckett, 50th anniversary production, PHCo/Theatre Royal Bath, UK tour and West End) 2005/6
- The Midsummer Marriage (Tippett, Lyric Opera Chicago) 2005
- The Importance of Being Earnest (Wilde, Los Angeles and New York) 2006
- Hay Fever (Coward, PHCo/Bill Kenwright Ltd, Haymarket) 2006
- Measure for Measure (Shakespeare, PHCo/Theatre Royal Bath) 2006
- Habeas Corpus (Alan Bennett, PHCo/Theatre Royal Bath and UK tour) 2006
- Amy's View (David Hare, PHCo/Theatre Royal Bath, UK tour and West End) 2006
- Old Times (Pinter, PHCo/Theatre Royal Bath and UK tour) 2007
- Little Nell (Simon Gray, world premiere, PHCo/Theatre Royal Bath) 2007
- Pygmalion (Shaw, PHCo/Theatre Royal Bath and Old Vic) 2007/8
- The Vortex (Coward, PHCo/BKL, Windsor, UK tour and West End) 2007/8
- Uncle Vanya (Chekhov, trans. Mulrine, English Touring Theatre, Rose Kingston and UK tour) 2008
- The Portrait of a Lady (Henry James, adapted by Frei, PHCo/Theatre Royal Bath and Rose Kingston) 2008
- A Doll's House (Ibsen, trans. Mulrine, PHCo/Theatre Royal Bath and Rose Kingston) 2008
- Love's Labours Lost (Shakespeare, Rose Kingston) 2008
- The Browning Version (Rattigan, PHCo/Theatre Royal Bath and UK tour) 2009
- The Apple Cart (Shaw, PHCo/Theatre Royal Bath) 2009
- A Midsummer Night's Dream (Shakespeare, PHCo, Rose Kingston) 2010
- Bedroom Farce (Ayckbourn, PHCo/BKL, Rose Kingston and West End) 2010
- The Rivals (Sheridan, PHCo/Theatre Royal Bath, UK tour and West End) 2010
- Twelfth Night (Shakespeare, NT) 2011
- Henry IV Parts 1 and 2 (Shakespeare, PHCo/Theatre Royal Bath) 2011

=== Film and television ===
Hall published a complete list of his films in his autobiography:

- Work Is a Four-Letter Word (1968)
- A Midsummer Night's Dream (1968)
- Three into Two Won't Go (1969)
- Perfect Friday (1970)
- The Homecoming (1973)
- Akenfield (1974)
- When Mother Went on Strike (1974)
- Aquarius TV (presenter: 1975–1976)
- She's Been Away (BBC Films, 1989: wins two awards at the Venice Film Festival)
- The Camomile Lawn (Channel 4 TV mini-series, 1992)
- Jacob (TV movie, 1994)
- Never Talk to Strangers (1995)
- The Final Passage (Channel 4 TV, 1996)

=== Books ===
- The Wars of the Roses (with John Barton: BBC Books) 1970
- John Gabriel Borkman (Ibsen, trans. with Inga-Stina Ewbank: Athlone Press) 1975
- Peter Hall's Diaries: the Story of a Dramatic Battle (ed. John Goodwin: Hamish Hamilton) 1983; reissued (Oberon Books) 2000
- Animal Farm (stage adaptation of George Orwell's novel: Heinemann Press/Methuen) 1986
- The Wild Duck (Henrik Ibsen, trans. with Inga-Stina Ewbank: Absolute Classics) 1990
- Making An Exhibition of Myself (autobiography: Sinclair-Stevenson Ltd) 1993; updated (Oberon Books) 2000
- An Absolute Turkey (Georges Feydeau, trans. with Nicki Frei: Oberon Books) 1994
- The Master Builder (Ibsen, trans. with Inga-Stina Ewbank) 1995
- The Necessary Theatre (Nick Hern Books) 1990
- Exposed by the Mask: Form and Language in Drama (Oberon Books) 2000
- Shakespeare's Advice to the Players (Oberon Books) 2003

== Awards and honours ==
Peter Hall was appointed a CBE in 1963 and knighted in 1977 for his services to the theatre. He was awarded the Chevalier de L'Ordre des Arts et des Lettres (1965), received the Shakespeare Prize (1967) and was elected Member of the Athens Academy for Services to Greek Drama (2004). His professional awards and nominations included two Tony Awards (The Homecoming and Amadeus) and four awards for lifetime achievement in the arts. In 2005 Hall was inducted into the American Theater Hall of Fame. He was Chancellor of Kingston University (2000–2013), held the Wortham Chair in Performing Arts at the University of Houston (1999–2002) and was awarded honorary doctorates from a number of universities including Cambridge, York, Liverpool, Bath and London.

== See also ==
- List of English speaking theatre directors in the 20th and 21st centuries
