= HMS Kent (F78) =

2000 Type 23 or Duke-class frigate of the Royal Navy

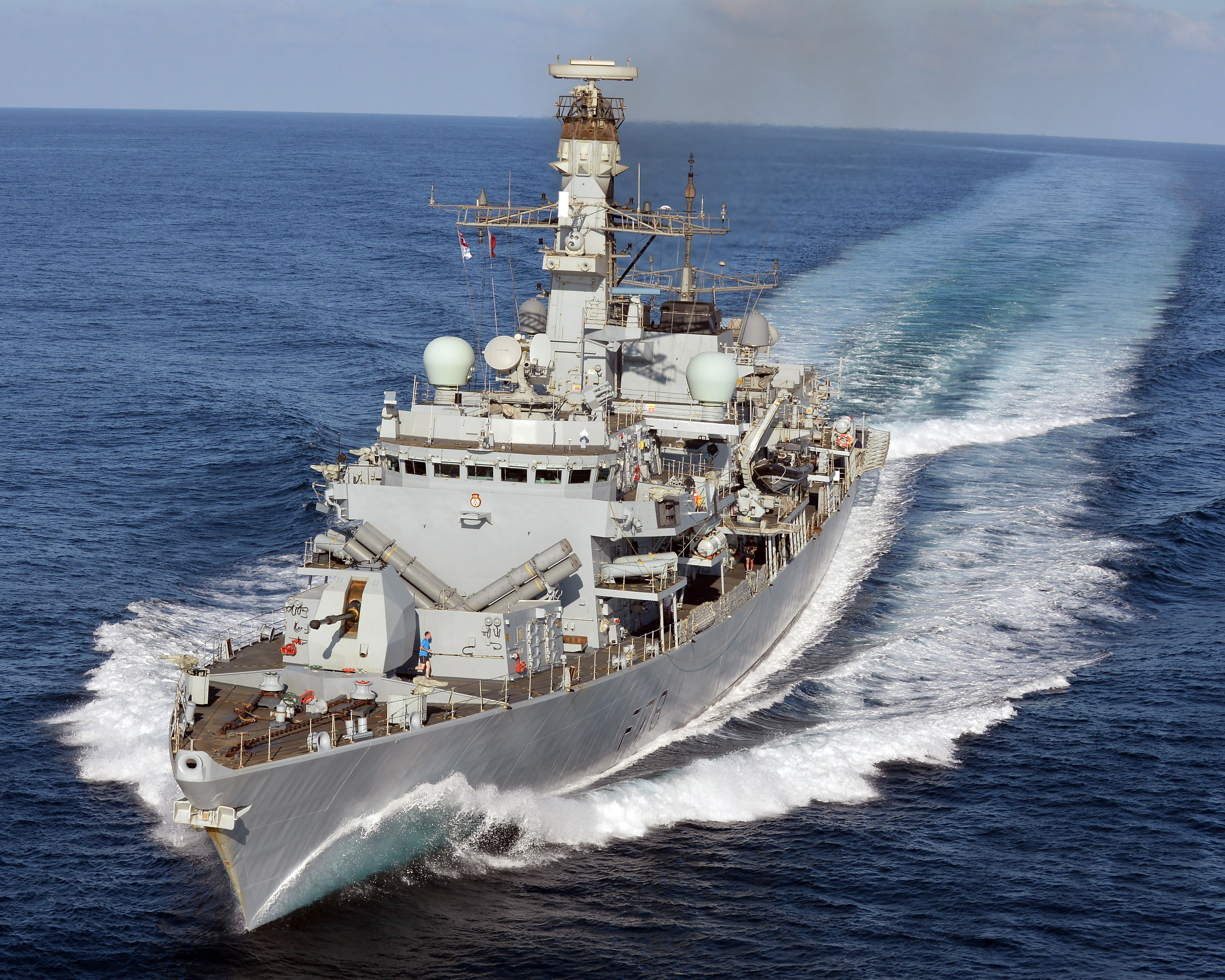
- Off Djibouti in 2015, with new "Kryten" gun after refit

History

United Kingdom
- Name: HMS Kent
- Namesake: Duke of Kent
- Operator: Royal Navy
- Ordered: February 1996
- Builder: Yarrow Shipbuilders
- Laid down: 16 April 1997
- Launched: 27 May 1998
- Sponsored by: Princess Alexandra, The Hon. Lady Ogilvy
- Commissioned: 8 June 2000
- Refit: LIFEX 2016–2018
- Home port: Devonport
- Identification: Pennant number: F78; IMO number: 8949719; MMSI number: 234606000; International call sign: GDIR
- Motto: Invicta (Unconquered)
- Status: In refit
- Badge

General characteristics
- Class & type: Type 23 frigate
- Displacement: 4,900 t (4,800 long tons; 5,400 short tons)
- Length: 133 m (436 ft 4 in)
- Beam: 16.1 m (52 ft 10 in)
- Draught: 7.3 m (23 ft 11 in)
- Propulsion: CODLAG: Four 1510 kW (2,025 shp) Paxman Valenta 12CM diesel generators; Two GEC electric motors delivering 2980 kW (4000 shp); Two Rolls-Royce Spey SM1C delivering 23,190 kW (31,100 shp)
- Speed: In excess of 28 kn (52 km/h; 32 mph)
- Range: 7,500 nautical miles (14,000 km) at 15 kn (28 km/h)
- Complement: 185 (accommodation for up to 205)
- Electronic warfare & decoys: UAF-1 ESM, or, UAT Mod 1; Seagnat; Type 182 towed torpedo decoy; Surface Ship Torpedo Defence
- Armament: Anti-air missiles: 1 × 32-cell GWS 35 Vertical Launching System (VLS) for: 32 × Sea Ceptor missiles (1–25+ km); Anti-ship missiles: Up to 2 × quad Harpoon launchers (8 × missiles, fit as of 2023); retired from RN service (end 2023); Anti-submarine torpedoes: 2 × twin 12.75 in (324 mm) Sting Ray torpedo tubes; Guns: 1 × BAE 4.5 inch Mk 8 naval gun; 2 × 30 mm DS30M Mk2 guns, or, 2 × 30 mm DS30B guns; 2 × Miniguns; 4 × General-purpose machine gun
- Aircraft carried: 1 × Wildcat HMA2, armed with: 2 × anti-submarine torpedoes (Martlet multirole missiles fitted in 2021/22 and initial operating capability for Sea Venom ASM from October 2025); or; 1 × Westland Merlin HM2, armed with; 4 × anti-submarine torpedoes
- Aviation facilities: Flight deck; Enclosed hangar

HMS Kent is a Type 23 Duke-class frigate of the Royal Navy, and the twelfth ship to bear the name, although formally she is named after the dukedom rather than the county. Sponsored by Princess Alexandra, The Hon. Lady Ogilvy (daughter of the late Prince George, Duke of Kent), Kent was launched on 28 May 1998 and commissioned on 8 June 2000 under the command of then Commander John Clink. She was the first ship to enter Royal Navy service in the 21st century and the first Royal Navy warship with a female executive officer, Lt Cdr Vanessa Jane Spiller, appointed in April 2001.

Kent's lineage boasts sixteen Battle Honours from the three given to the first Kent of 46 guns built in 1653, to the five awarded to the ninth and tenth Kents of World War I and World War II.

== Service history ==
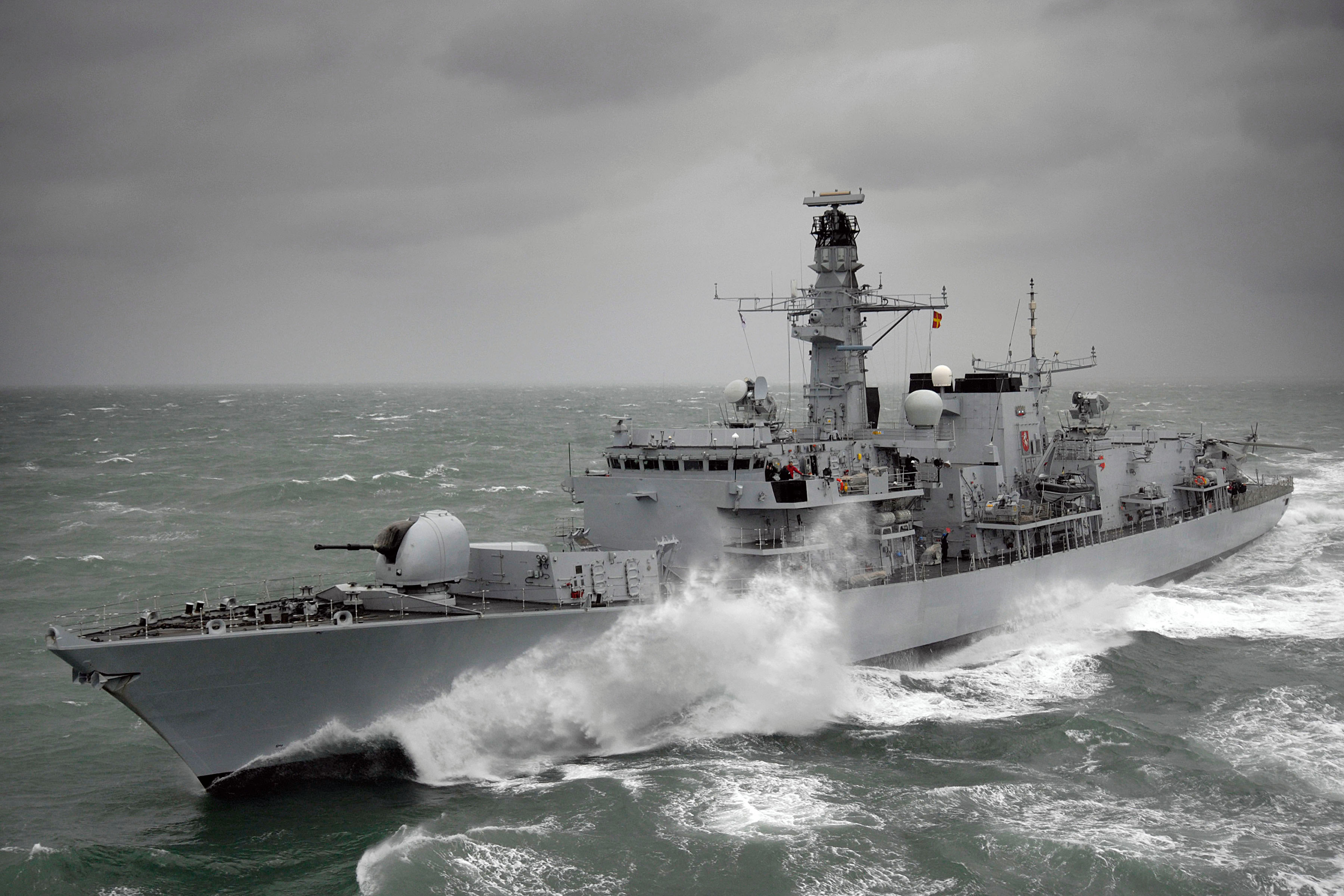
Still with pre-refit main gun in 2010

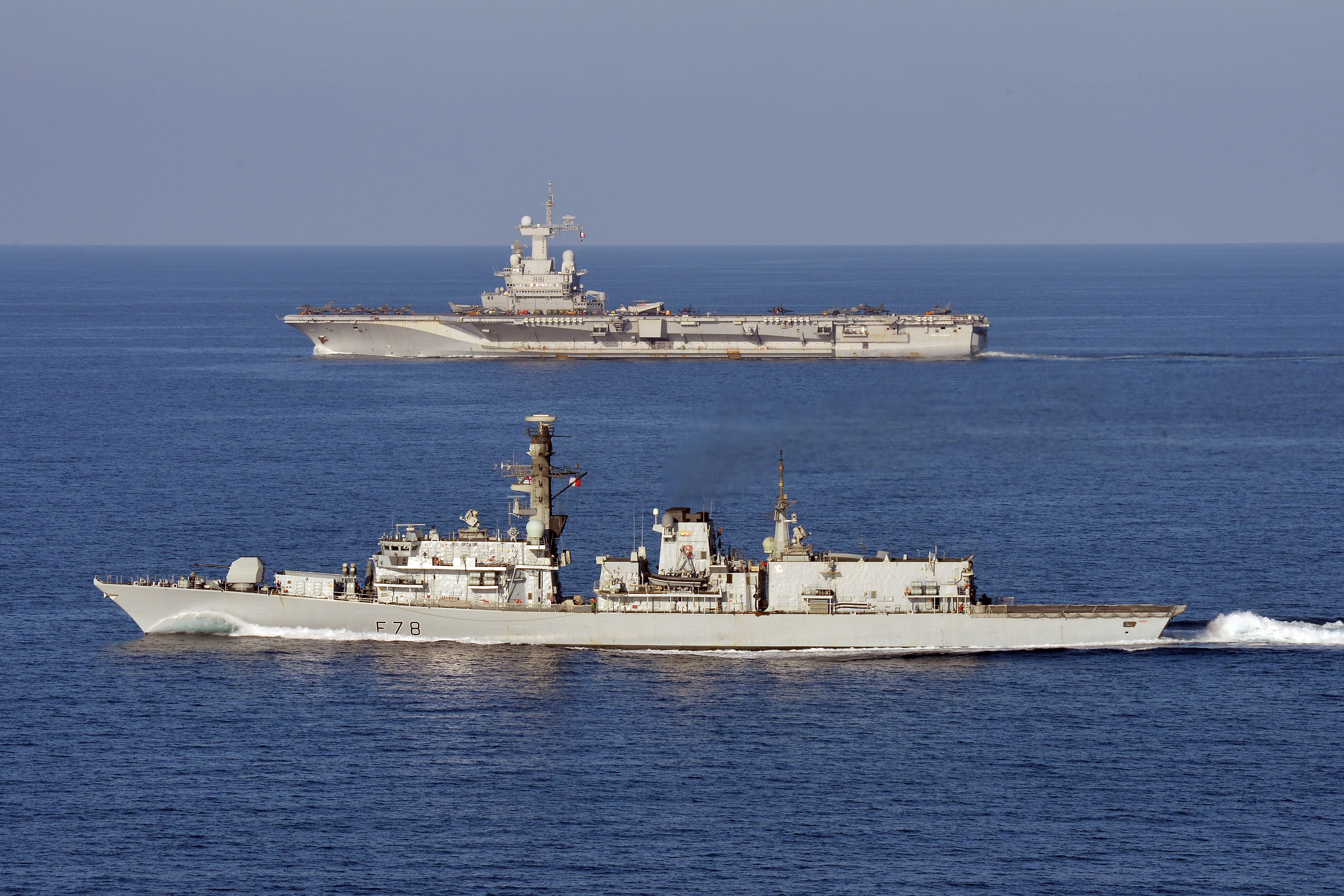
Escorting the French aircraft carrier Charles de Gaulle off Djibouti in 2015

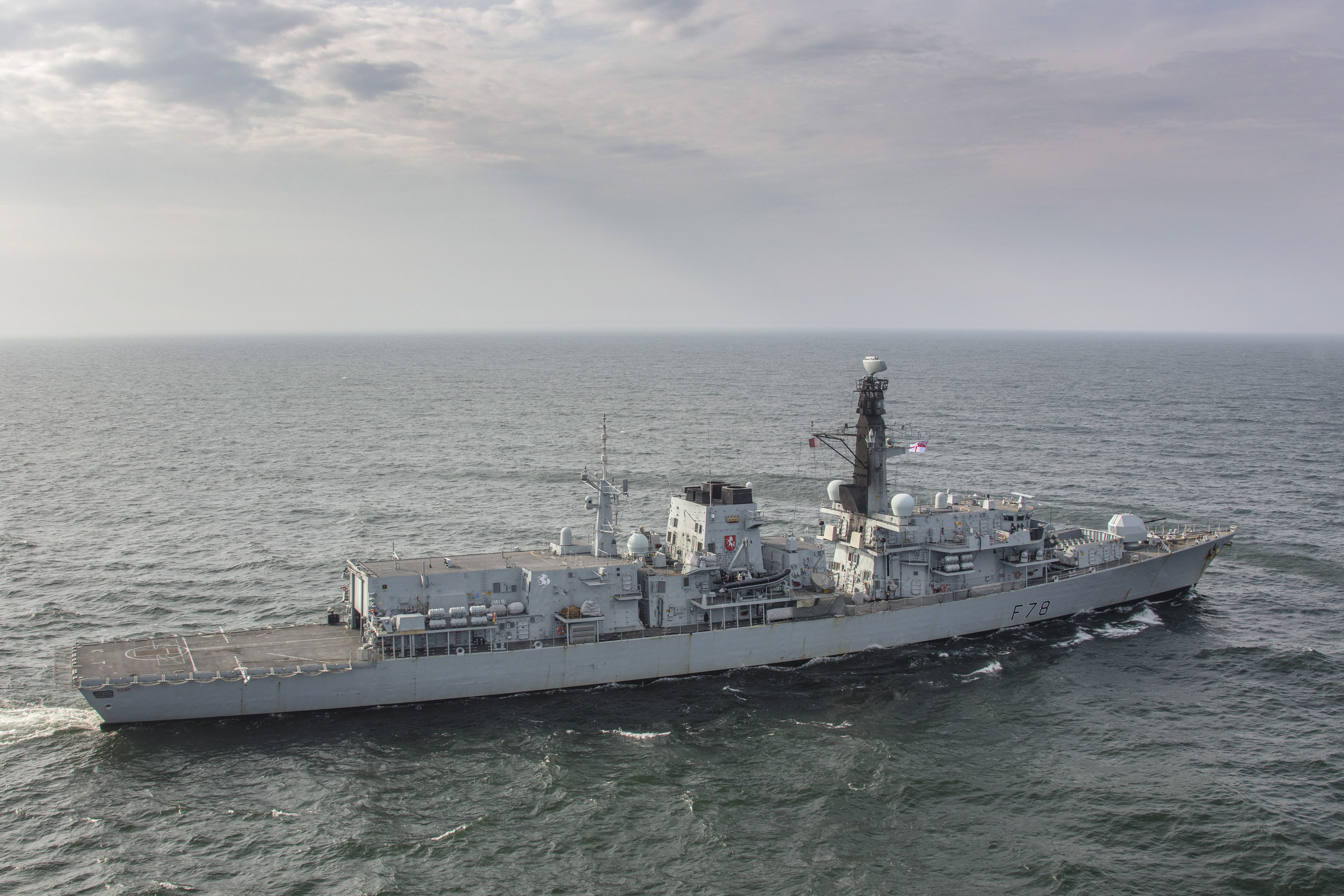
On exercise during BALTOPS 20

=== 2001–2010 ===
March 2002 saw Kent return from the Persian Gulf after a five-month mission. Kent seized more than £4 million of oil and illegal cargo: a record for the time. This mission also included the boarding of MV Ismael, a vessel which strayed in and out of Iranian waters to avoid capture – waters which Kent was forbidden to enter.

Kent was damaged following a collision with HMS Argyll during a line transfer demonstration off Portsmouth in June 2004.

On 12 June 2006 Kent started a six-month deployment to Gibraltar, Malta and the Suez Canal.

Kent was in the Northern Persian Gulf working 22-day patrols safeguarding the oil platforms and checking shipping in the area as per United Nations Security Council Regulations. Kent later conducted a self-maintenance period at Port Rashid, Dubai. After 60 days of patrols, 47 security sweeps of vessels approaching the oil platforms and 515 queries of merchant vessels, Kent left the Northern Persian Gulf and set sail home. A four-day visit to Muscat in Oman followed, which included training with the Omani Navy.

In Mumbai, Prince Andrew visited Kent.

15:00 hours, 5 November 2006 saw Kent hand over her duties to Sutherland in Salalah, Oman. Later on her way home, Kent made a goodwill visit to Beirut on Friday 17 November. The ship featured on national news and the crew visited some of the local sites.

After Beirut, Kent visited Souda Bay and then the port of Civitavecchia, Italy. Algiers was the next stop, showcasing training to the Algerian Navy.

In February 2007 the ship was awarded the Thales fleet active ASW award 2005/2006. Due to the busy period of deployments, the award ceremony had to be delayed until 2007.

December 2007 saw Kent preparing for the customary Operational Sea Training period, training with aircraft and sea boat operations.

January 2008 saw preparations for OST continuing afoot ready for the initial materials and safety audit.

Kent was in refit for replacement of two of the four Paxman Valenta diesel engines.

May 2008 saw Kent off the Channel Islands providing a demonstration of the Royal Navy to the local islanders. This was also the first Jersey Boat Show with Kent the largest vessel on show. The following Thursday saw the culmination of Operational Sea Training.

Kent would get underway from 'The Wall' at Portsmouth for a six-month deployment to South Asia and the Far East. This voyage included visits to countries such as Russia, China, Japan and Indonesia, as well as participation in various multi-national exercises.

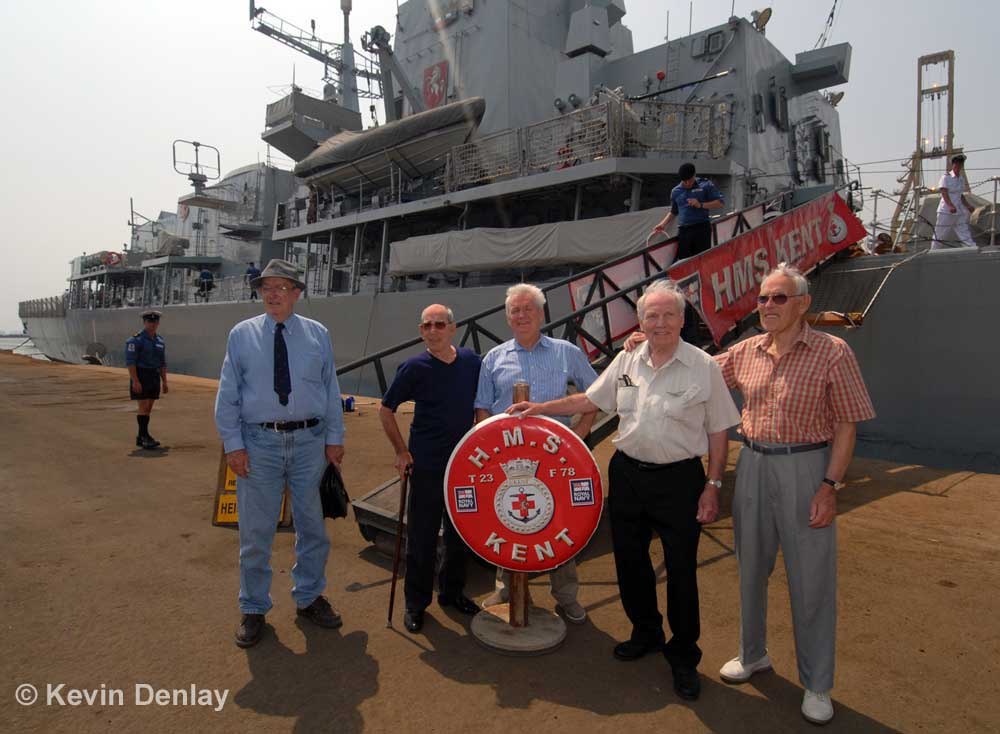
HMS Exeter veterans disembarking HMS Kent, Tandjong Priok 28 July 2008. From left; Rob Rae, George Gaskell, (diver Kevin Denlay), Bill Francis, Joe Asher.

27 July 2008, saw Kent hosting a solemn memorial service over the historic shipwreck of HMS Exeter in the Java Sea. Kent left the Indonesian port of Surabaya (just as Exeter had on the evening of 28 February 1942, on her last fateful voyage), performed the ceremony and then continued on to Jakarta. Aboard were a BBC film crew and four of HMS Exeter's veteran survivors (photo below), one of the divers involved in the discovery of the wreck, (who, representing the other three discovery team members, and as part of the memorial service, handed over to the four survivors the Royal Navy Ensign they had 'flown' on the wreck during their discovery dives in February 2007), along with several British dignitaries and high ranking naval officers.

In June 2010, Kent was sent on a mission to Sweden. The celebration of the official Queen's Birthday Party was held on board the British warship in Gothenburg harbour, the first time that the event has been held outside Stockholm. After a stop at Hanö island where tribute was paid to the fifteen British sailors who rest there, Kent then continued to Stockholm to join the celebrations for the Wedding of Victoria, Crown Princess of Sweden, and Daniel Westling.

In December 2010, Kent was withdrawn from the deployable fleet and entered overhaul. Her Commander, Nick Cooke-Priest moved to command Iron Duke, leaving second-in-command, Lt Cdr Alasdair Peppe in charge.

=== 2011-2020 ===
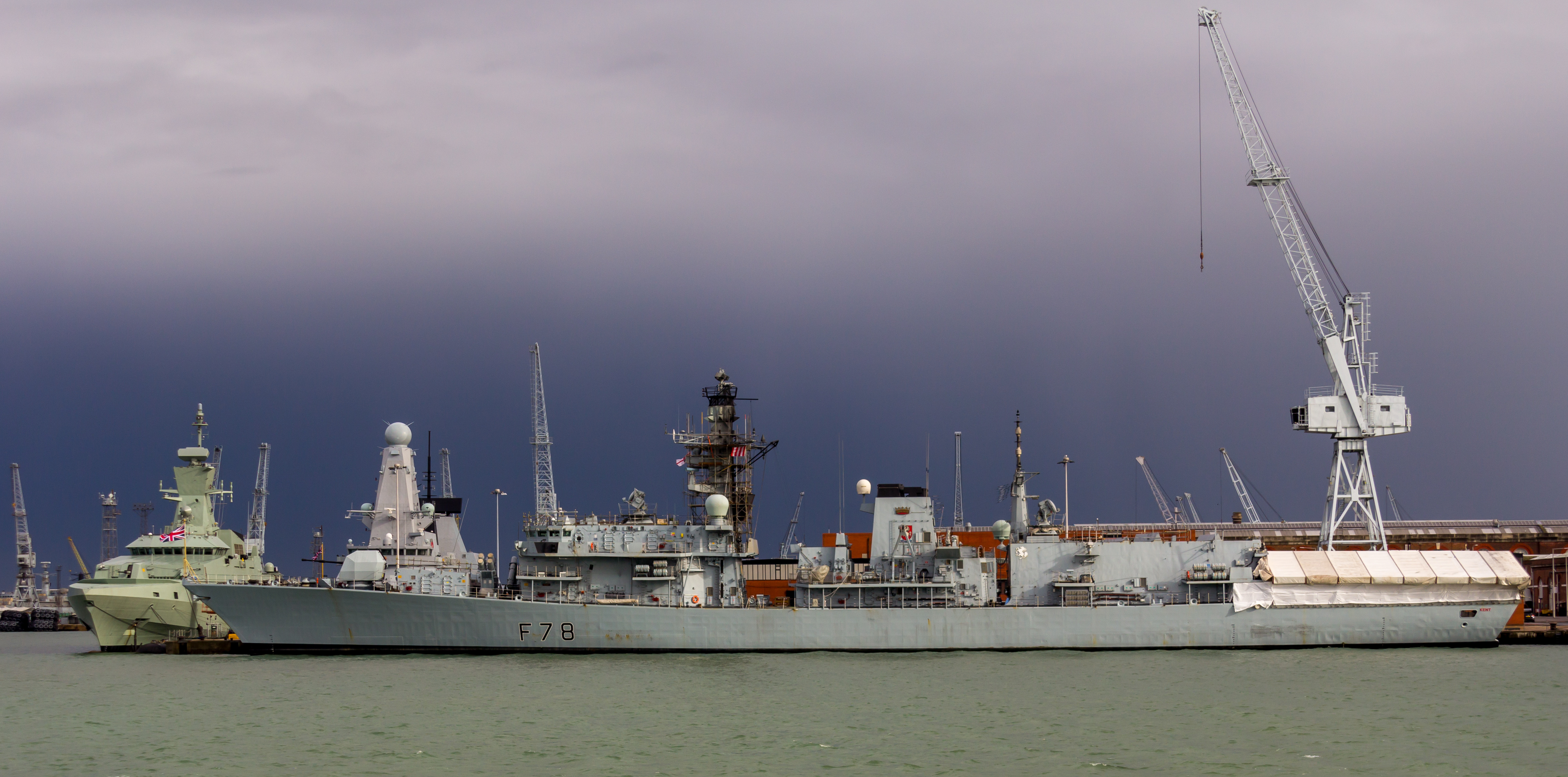
During overhaul in October 2013

Cdr Ben Ripley assumed command following the 2012 refit and deployed to the Horn of Africa on anti-priracy and anti-drug missions in July 2013, . She worked with the Combined Maritime Forces and returned home in October 2013

In October 2014, Kent deployed to the Persian Gulf alongside USS Carl Vinson and other US Navy fleet units in the US Fifth Fleet's area of responsibility to help in efforts against smugglers, pirates, terrorists and also in the fight against the Islamic State of Iraq and the Levant. The ship visited many countries in the middle east, including Bahrain and Jordan. HMS Kent returned in May 2015.

In late 2016, Kent entered the Frigate Refit Complex in Devonport for an extensive refit which will include the fitting of the SeaCeptor missile system in place of Sea Wolf. After the refit, she was recommissioned in Portsmouth on 5 October 2018 under the command of Cdr Andy Brown, MBE.

On 12 August 2019, Kent deployed toward the Persian Gulf to relieve HMS Duncan and protect commercial shipping in the Persian Gulf region.

In 2020 Sutherland commanded a NATO task group of U.S. destroyer USS Ross (DDG-71) and Norwegian frigate HNoMS Thor Heyerdahl on a deployment to the Barents Sea above the Arctic Circle, supported by RFA Tidespring (A136), to exercise freedom of navigation near Russia. They were supported by a variety of aircraft, including RAF Typhoons for the first time operating in the high north. This was the first time the Royal Navy had led a multinational task group in the area in more than 20 years, and was part of an increased British effort in the region.

In May 2020, Kent participated in a task group deployment to the Barents Sea above the Arctic Circle near Russia, with three U.S. Arleigh Burke-class destroyers.

=== 2021–present ===
In 2021, Kent deployed to the Pacific as part of the Royal Navy's carrier strike group.

On 14 October 2021, Kent visited Chattogram, Bangladesh as part of celebrations of 50 years of Bangladeshi independence. She departed Bangladesh on the 19 October.

Cdr Jeremy "Jez" Brettell assumed command of Kent as her 14th and current commanding officer, relieving Cdr Matt J Sykes on 20 January 2022.

In 2022, Kent spent 127 days at sea. In September 2023, the frigate was again tasked to escort HMS Queen Elizabeth during her "Operation FIREDRAKE" deployment in northern European waters. After some delay, the ship departed Portsmouth in late October.

== Commanding officers ==
Notable commanding officers include Kent's first CO, then Cdr John Clink, who went on to command HMS Ark Royal, Commander United Kingdom Strike Force, British Forces Gibraltar, and Commander Fleet Operational Sea Training, retiring as a rear admiral, and earning an OBE in 2002 and CBE in 2017. Cdr Gavin Pritchard went on to become Chief of Staff of the UK Maritime Component Commander's HQ in Bahrain, earning an OBE in 2009. Cdr Nick Cooke-Priest would rise to Commodore and commander of HMS Queen Elizabeth, earning an OBE in 2016. Cdr Andrew S Brown earned a MBE prior to his appointment to Kent as commander of HMS Chiddingfold in 2016.

== In popular culture ==
On 2 September 2000, men and women aboard HMS Kent participated in a Changing Rooms special to give the ship's mess rooms a makeover.

Emily Hamilton's role of Lt Cdr Jenny Howard in the 2004 ITV series Making Waves was influenced by the real life Kent XO, Lt Cdr Vanessa Jane Spiller, then the first and only female XO serving aboard a warship in the Royal Navy.

== Affiliations ==
- Kent and Sharpshooters Yeomanry
- No. 6 Squadron RAF
- The Cinque Ports
- The Royal Tank Regiment
