= John Goodwin (theatre publicist) =

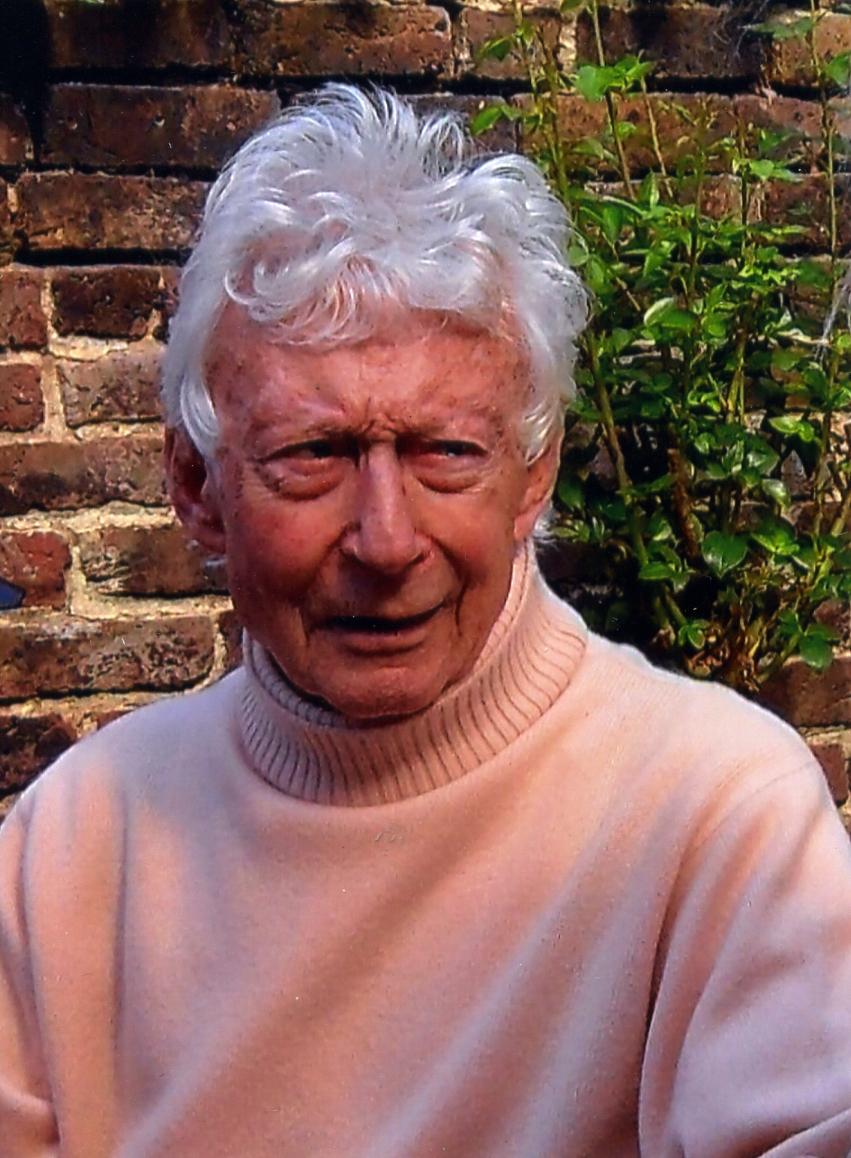
- Born: John Goodwin; 4 May 1921; London
- Died: 29 July 2018 (aged 97)
- Known for: Theatre Publicist, Writer, Editor
- Spouse: Suzanne Ebel

John Goodwin (4 May 1921 – 29 July 2018) was a British theatre publicist, writer and editor who played a crucial role in the development of subsidised theatre in post-war Britain; first with the Royal Shakespeare Company where in the 60s he led the media campaign against concerted attempts to close its flourishing London base; then with the Royal National Theatre where, as an associate director and member of its planning committee, he was a key figure in the administrative team which, in the '70s and '80s, shaped its historic first years on London's South Bank. He was the author of a number of books on the theatre including the best-selling A Short Guide to Shakspeare's Plays (Heinemann Education, 1979). He also edited and compiled the classic reference work British Theatre Design (Weidenfeld & Nicolson, 1990) and edited the internationally best-selling diaries of Sir Peter Hall (Hamish Hamilton, 1983).

== Theatre career ==
In 1946 Goodwin became assistant to David Fairweather, a well-known press representative for many West End Theatres. In 1948 he represented Basil Dean's British Theatre Group at the St. James's Theatre. From 1948 – 56 he represented the annual Shakespeare season at Stratford-upon-Avon during the great post-war Shakespeare renaissance there. From 1956-7 he worked briefly in book publishing with the Reinhardt/Bodley Head group.

In 1958 he was asked to re-join the Stratford Company and that year, with them, visited Moscow and Leningrad ( St Petersburg). This was the first English company to act in Leningrad since the Revolution. Goodwin covered the visit for the Daily Telegraph (during this visit Coral Browne, playing Gertrude in Hamlet, met the spy Guy Burgess, which became the subject of Alan Bennett's play 'An Englishman Abroad'.)

From its creation in 1960 by its then director Peter Hall, and for fourteen further years, Goodwin was head of press and publications for the Royal Shakespeare Company. In 1973 he was asked by Sir Peter (now director of the National Theatre ) to move to the National and take up the same post there, a position he held until 1988.

In these two appointments he saw theatre history in the making. Both companies were staging productions of arguably unsurpassed brilliance, while achieving massive expansions. The RSC was adding a London theatre, the Aldwych, to its Stratford base. The National, later, was moving from The Old Vic to its present three-auditorium home on London's South Bank.

These changes are now widely regarded as having been wholly beneficial but, at the time, each met with a storm of media criticism, due mainly to the increased cost in public money. Bruising battles had to be fought and won. Goodwin was at the centre of the controversies, working closely with Peter Hall to shape the National Theatre's official responses. His skill at handling these situations earned him the respect of those around him. Contemporary accounts describe him variously as 'formidable', 'genius', and 'sly and brilliant'.

Goodwin edited the programmes for both institutions, including, for the RSC, those for the entire Shakespeare canon. Also at the RSC, together with the graphic designer George Mayhew, he invented and perfected the revolutionary style of programmes which combined expert comment with vivid graphics, a format which was later taken up by virtually all subsidised theatres.

After his retirement from the National Theatre, Goodwin continued writing. He stayed in touch with former colleagues and maintained a keen critical interest in contemporary British theatre. Following a brief illness, he died on 29 July 2018 at the Chiswick Nursing Centre, close to his home in Hammersmith.

== Early years ==
Born a twin (his sister Mary Wilder died in 2010), Goodwin is the son of Jessie Lonnen, a successful musical comedy actress before her marriage, and A.E. Goodwin, deputy head of Inland Revenue at Somerset House. His maternal grandparents were E. J. Lonnen, a star of the old Gaiety Theatre, and Emily Morgan, a dancer. Previous generations were strolling players.

When Goodwin was three his father died unexpectedly. In 1926, Jessie and her twins, now aged five, moved from London to the country. They had been invited by Jessie's sister Fay to live with her and her daughter and husband at their cottage, Fipps, near Henley-on-Thames. Fay's husband, Philip Braham, composed music for the revues which were very fashionable then (his Limehouse Blues remains a jazz classic). He and Fay would give weekend parties lasting far into the night, often attended by stars, among whom Goodwin remembers Jack Buchanan, Elsie Randolph and Boris Karloff.

John was schooled at Christ's Hospital where he was an unremarkable scholar but, because of repeated inner ear infections, held the school record for length of time spent in the infirmary. In 1941 he joined the Royal Navy as a rating (ordinary coder) and served at sea in the North Atlantic and the Arctic. In the destroyer HMS Chiddingfold he took part in the combined operation raid against German military bases on the island of Vaagso, Norway – a notable allied success of the early war years. Commissioned Sub-Lieutenant RNVR (special branch) he was later promoted Lieutenant. In 1945 he was sent East, prepared for serious action, but saw none for the war with Japan ended that summer.

== Family ==
Goodwin married the prize-winning novelist Suzanne Goodwin (née Ebel). The couple met in 1947 and were together as man and mistress, later man and wife, until Suzanne died in 2008. During much of that time they spent up to three months each year working and enjoying life in their modest 17th century apartment in the South of France. Goodwin became a Catholic after Suzanne's death, taking on her strongly felt but lightly held religion.

Children: a son, Tim, by Suzanne. A stepson James ( d. 2005 ) by Suzanne's first husband. A stepdaughter, Marigold, adopted by Suzanne and her first husband.

== Published works ==
=== As author ===
- Shakespeare is Good Box Office (22 September 1955) London Calling Magazine.
- Four Centuries of Dark Ladies (11 April 1958) The Tatler.
- A Short Guide to Shakespeare's Plays (1979) Heinemann Education ISBN 978-0435183714 Reprinted fifteen times.
- Losing my Marbles (2003) Oberon Modern Plays. ISBN 978-1840022421 Script of a one-man show performed by Trader Faulkner, who co-authored with Goodwin, performed at the Jermyn Street Theatre in 1999 and elsewhere.
- A Most Sweet Poison (2006) Oberon Modern Plays. ISBN 978-1840026061. A play loosely based on Alphonse Daudet's novel Sappho.

=== As editor ===
- Royal Shakespeare Theatre Company 1960 – 1963 (1964) Max Reinhardt
- Peter Hall's Diaries (1983) Hamish Hamilton (UK), (1984) Harper & Row (US) also serialised in The Sunday Times
- The Painted Banquet, (1987)Weidenfeld & Nicolson, the film designer Jocelyn Rickard's autobiography
- Britain's Royal National Theatre (1988) Nick Hern Books, written by Tim Goodwin ISBN 978-1854590053
- British Theatre Design (1990) Weidenfeld & Nicolson (UK), (1991) St. Martin's 1991 (USA) ISBN 978-0297830702
- RSC Theatre Programmes (1960 - 1974) Royal Shakespeare Company
- NT Theatre Programmes (1973 - 1988) Royal National Theatre

=== Other ===
- Shakespeare Panorama (1959) Devised with Angus McBean, the photographer, to celebrate Stratford's 100th Season, an exhibition consisting of a single giant panoramic photomontage 140 feet long and 8 feet high showing the changes in the staging of Shakespeare over four centuries.
