= Suzanne Goodwin =

British writer

Suzanne Cecile Ebel Belsey Goodwin
- Born: Suzanne Cecile Ebel; 27 September 1916; Sutton, Surrey, England
- Died: 28 February 2008 (aged 91)
- Occupation: Novelist
- Spouse(s): 1. Adrian Belsey; 2. John Goodwin (1971–2008)
- Children: 3
- Writing career
- Pen name: Suzanne Ebel, Suzanne Goodwin, Cecily Shelbourne
- Language: English
- Period: 1963–2001
- Genre: Romantic novels
- Notable awards: RoNA Award

Suzanne Goodwin, née Suzanne Ebel (27 September 1916 – 28 February 2008), was a British writer of over 40 romantic novels and was translated into some 15 languages. Under her maiden name she wrote contemporary romances and British guides, while she wrote historical romances under her married name. She also used the pseudonym Cecily Shelbourne. In 1964, her novel Journey from Yesterday won the Romantic Novel of the Year Award awarded by the Romantic Novelists' Association. and in 1986, her book A Guide to London's Riverside (written in collaboration with Doreen Impey) won the British Travel Association Award.

== Biography ==
=== Personal life ===
Born Suzanne Cecile Ebel on 27 September 1916 in Sutton, Surrey, England, of an Irish mother and French father, the latter an interior decorator. She was educated at Roman Catholic schools in England and Belgium. In London, she worked as journalist on the Woman's Page of The Times, and from 1950 to 1972 as a director of the advertising agency Young and Rubicam.

She married Adrian Belsey, a dentist, with whom she had a son, James, and an adopted daughter, Marigold, but the marriage faltered. In 1947, she met and began a long affair with John Goodwin. A theatre publicist, he was head of publications and publicity for the Royal Shakespeare Company and The National Theatre, and later edited Peter Hall's diaries. After Belsey's death in 1971, they married and had a son, Tim.

She died on 28 February 2008.

=== Career ===
She published Journey from Yesterday in 1963, which won the Romantic Novel of the Year Award by the Romantic Novelists' Association. She started writing contemporary romances under her maiden name Suzanne Ebel, and used her married name Suzanne Goodwin when writing historical romances.

== Bibliography ==
=== As Suzanne Ebel ===
==== Contemporary novels ====
- Love the Magician (1956)
- Journey from Yesterday (1963)
- The Half-Enchanted (1964)
- The Dangerous Winter (1965)
- The Love Campaign (1965)
- A Perfect Stranger (1966)
- A Name in Lights (1968)
- A Most Auspicious Star (1969)
- Somersault (1971)
- Portrait of Jill (1972)
- Dear Kate (1972)
- To Seek a Star (1973)
- The Family Feeling (1973)
- Girl by the Sea (1974)
- Music in Winter (1975)
- Grove of Olives (1976)
- River Voices (1976)
- The Double Rainbow (1977)
- A Rose in the Heather (1978)
- The Provencal Summer (1980)
- Julia's Sister (1982)
- The House of Nightingales (1985)
- The Clover Field (1987)
- Reflections in a Lake (1988)

==== Guides ====
- Explore the Cotswolds by Bicycle (1973) (with Doreen Impey)
- A Guide to London's Riverside (1985) (with Doreen Impey)

=== As Suzanne Goodwin ===
==== Single novels ====
- The Winter Spring (1978)
- Emerald (1980)
- The Winter Sisters (1980)
- Floodtide (1983)
- Sisters (1984)
- Cousins (1986)
- Daughters (1987)
- Lovers (1988)
- To Love a Hero (1989)
- A Change of Season (1991)
- The Rising Storm (1992)
- While the Music Lasts (1992)
- The Difference (1994)
- Sheer Chance (1997)
- A Rising Star (1997)
- Starstruck (1997)
- One Bright Star (1998)
- French Leave (2001)

==== Collaboration ====
- Godfrey: A Special Time Remembered (1983) (by Jill Bennet)

=== As Cecily Shelbourne ===
==== Single novel ====
- Stage of Love (1978)
