= Wycherley =

People with the family name Wycherley include:

- Don Wycherley, Irish actor
- Florence Wycherley, Irish politician
- Niamh Wycherley, Irish medieval historian
- Ralph Wycherley, Canadian hockey player
- Richard Ernest Wycherley, English Classicist
- Roland Wycherley (born 1941), English businessman
- Billy Fury (Ronald Wycherley), British musician
- William Wycherley, (c. 1640–1716), English dramatist
