= Inga-Stina Ewbank =

Professor, literary historian, translator

Inga-Stina Ewbank SBS (13 June 1932, Sweden – 7 June 2004, London, UK) was a Swedish-born academic and educator in Great Britain, Munich, Hong Kong and the United States, as well as an author and translator. She is believed to have been to date the only holder of an English university chair of English Literature to have spoken no English until the age of 19 (in her case, having spoken only Swedish until that time).

== Early life and education ==
Born as Inga-Stina Ekeblad, she attended school in Gothenburg before winning a scholarship to Carleton College, Minnesota. After graduating, she had a string of research appointments: at Sheffield University (MA), at Liverpool University (as William Noble Fellow) from 1955 to 1957, and at the Shakespeare Institute of Birmingham University from 1957 to 1960. During the later part of this period she taught at the Ludwig-Maximilians-Universität München.

== Teaching English literature ==
She returned to Liverpool University as lecturer in 1960, and was promoted to a Senior Lecturership in 1970. Her interest in women's literature was demonstrated by Their Proper Sphere: a study of the Brontë sisters as early-Victorian female novelists (1966). In 1972, she became Reader in English literature at Bedford College, London.

In 1985, Ewbank accepted a chair at the University of Leeds. Greatly in demand as a lecturer and at overseas conferences, she travelled widely, with spells as a visiting scholar at Harvard University and other American universities. From 1982 to 1997, she was a member of the University Grants Committee for the University of Hong Kong.

She was recognized as a scholar of Ibsen's works and worked increasingly in both England and Norway during the later part of her life.

== Death ==
She died in London on 7 June 2004, at age 71.

== Family ==
In 1959, she married Roger Ewbank; they had one son and two daughters.

== Awards ==
- Elected to the Norwegian Academy of Science and Letters in 1991
- Honorary doctorate from the University of Hong Kong in 1999
- Awarded the Silver Bauhinia Star in 1999
- Honorary doctorate from the University of Oslo in 1998
- Honorary doctorate from the University of Gothenburg in 2001
