= Niamh Wycherley =

Irish medieval historian

- Occupations: historian and lecturer

Academic background
- Education: University College Dublin
- Thesis: The Cult of Relics in Early Christian Ireland (2012)
- Doctoral advisor: Charles Doherty
- Other advisors: Elva Johnston (2012–2013); Dáibhí Ó Cróinín (2017–2019)

Niamh Wycherley is an Irish medieval historian, known for her work on Brigit and the cult of relics in early medieval Ireland.

== Education ==
Wycherley studied at University College Dublin, where she obtained her Bachelor of Arts degree in history and politics in 2004. She then went on to complete a master's degree in Medieval Studies in 2007. Her master's thesis, supervised by Elva Johnston, focussed on Cogitosus's Vita Sanctae Brigidae. She completed her PhD under Charles Doherty at UCD in 2012, examining the "cult of relics" in early medieval Ireland.

== Academic career ==
In 2012, she was awarded a Postdoctoral Fellowship by the Irish Research Council, during which she was mentored by Elva Johnston at UCD.

In 2015, Wycherley published The Cult of Relics in Early Medieval Ireland, based on the research completed during her PhD and IRC fellowship, and she was awarded the NUI Publication Prize in History in 2017 for this monograph.

She was awarded a Postdoctoral Fellowship in Irish/Celtic Studies by the National University of Ireland in 2017. She worked at the Moore Institute, NUI Galway, with Prof. Dáibhí Ó Cróinín on analysing the terminology relating to the cult of relics in fifth- to twelfth-century Ireland.

She was a fellow at the Moore Institute until 2019, when she became an assistant lecturer at Maynooth University, where she is now assistant professor in early Irish history, between the departments of history and early Irish. She teaches the medieval history of Ireland, from the 5th to 12th centuries.

Wycherley is a member of the Royal Irish Academy's Young Academy Ireland (YAI). She was elected to YAI's executive committee in 2023, and served as its first co-chair, and subsequently chair, from 2023 to 2025. She remains a member of the executive committee.

Wycherley hosts The Medieval Irish History Podcast, which she stated in 2023, supported by the Department of Early Irish at Maynooth University.

Wycherley contributed to RTÉ One's 2023 documentary Finding Brigid, presented by Siobhán McSweeney, and was historical consultant on RTÉ's Blindboy: the Land of Slaves and Scholars in 2024.

Wycherley is the principal investigator of a 4-year (2022–2026) Research Ireland Pathway project titled Power and Patronage in medieval Ireland: Clonard from the 6th to 12th centuries.

== Publications ==
=== Books ===
- The Cult of Relics in Early Medieval Ireland (Turnhout, 2016); ISBN 978-2503551845.

=== Chapters ===
- 'The enduring power of the cult of relics – an Irish perspective' in Chris Jones, Conor Kostick and Klaus Oschema (eds), Making the Medieval Relevant (Berlin, 2019).
- 'Pregnancy in Medieval Ireland' in Salvador Ryan (ed.), Birth and the Irish: a miscellany (Dublin, 2021).
- 'Eoin MacNeill and a "celtic" church in early medieval Ireland' in Conor Mulvagh and Emer Purcell (eds), Eoin MacNeill; the pen and the sword (Cork, 2021).
- '(Not) dreaming of a white Christmas in "pre-Norman" Ireland' in Salvador Ryan (ed.), Christmas and the Irish: a miscellany (Dublin, 2023).

=== Journal articles ===
- 'Latin and Irish words for “graveyard” in medieval Ireland' in Peritia, 29 (2018), pp 201–20.

=== Online articles ===
- 'Notre-Dame's rescued relics, faith and Paris' in RTÉ Brainstorm, 16 Apr. 2019.
- 'The cult of the dead in medieval Ireland' in RTÉ Brainstorm, 31 Oct. 2019.
- 'Opinion: Make no mistake - history shows us that Brigit was a boss' in The Journal, 29 Jan. 2023.
- 'What was Christmas like in Medieval Ireland?' in RTÉ Brainstorm, 20 Dec. 2023.
- 'Meet St Patrick's spin doctor' in RTÉ Brainstorm, 14 Mar. 2024.
- 'CSI St Patrick: just where is the saint's body?' in RTÉ Brainstorm, 12 Mar. 2025.
- 'Why Sitric Silkenbeard is the greatest Dubliner of all time' in RTÉ Brainstorm, 31 July 2025.
- 'Will the real St Brigid please stand up?' in RTÉ Brainstorm, 29 Jan. 2026.
- 'How St Brigid made Kildare the hotspot of 7th century Ireland' in RTÉ Brainstorm, 29 Jan. 2026.

=== Magazine articles ===
- 'The Notre Dame fire and the cult of relics' in History Ireland, 27/4 (July/Aug. 2019).
