= HMS Chiddingfold =

Two ships of the Royal Navy have borne the name HMS Chiddingfold after the fox hunt at Petworth, Sussex:

- HMS Chiddingfold (L31) was a Hunt-class destroyer escort destroyer launched in 1941. She was transferred to the Indian Navy after the Second World War and renamed INS Ganga (D94).
- HMS Chiddingfold (M37) is a Hunt-class mine countermeasures vessel launched in 1983, in service as of 2024.
